= Culture of Hong Kong =

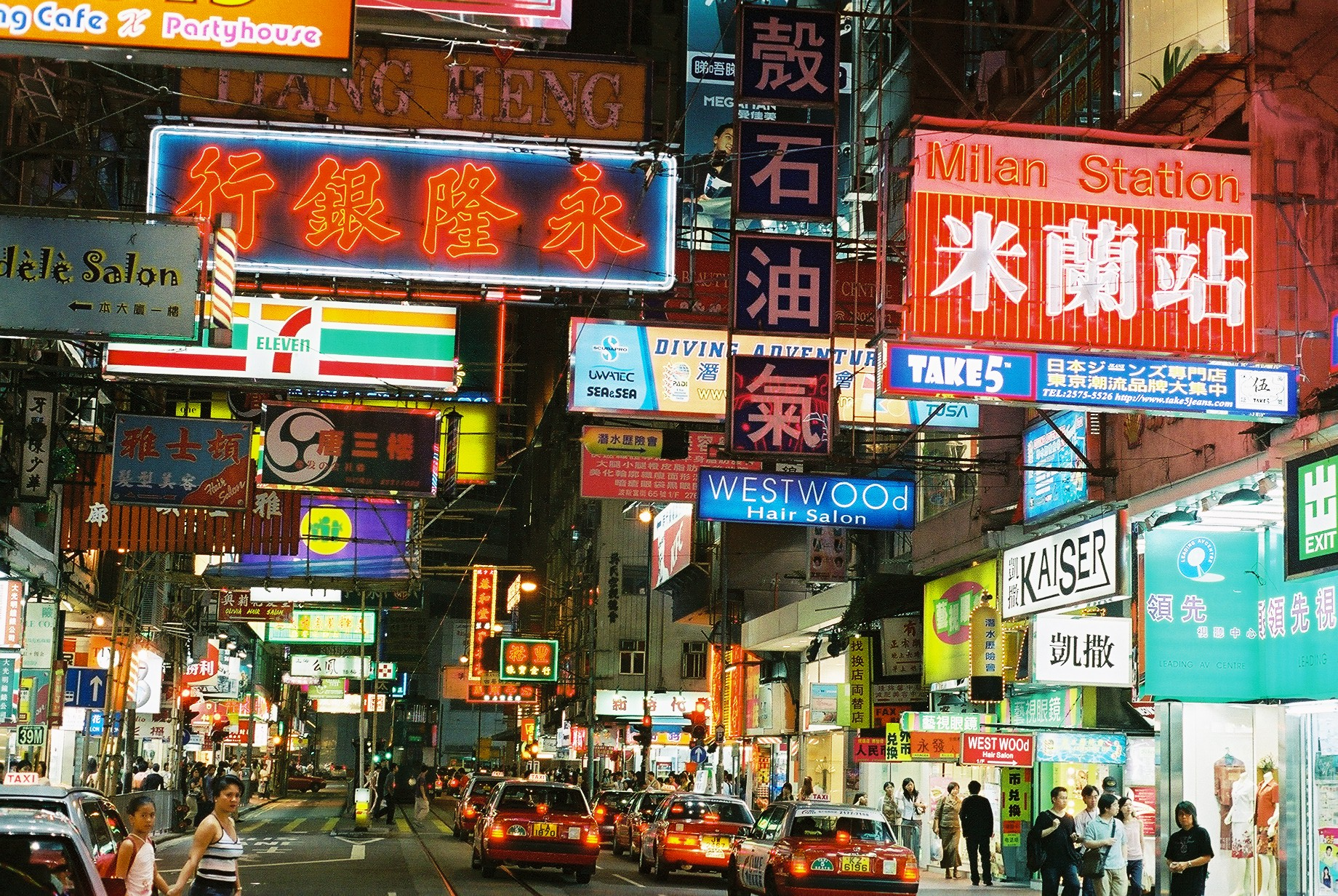
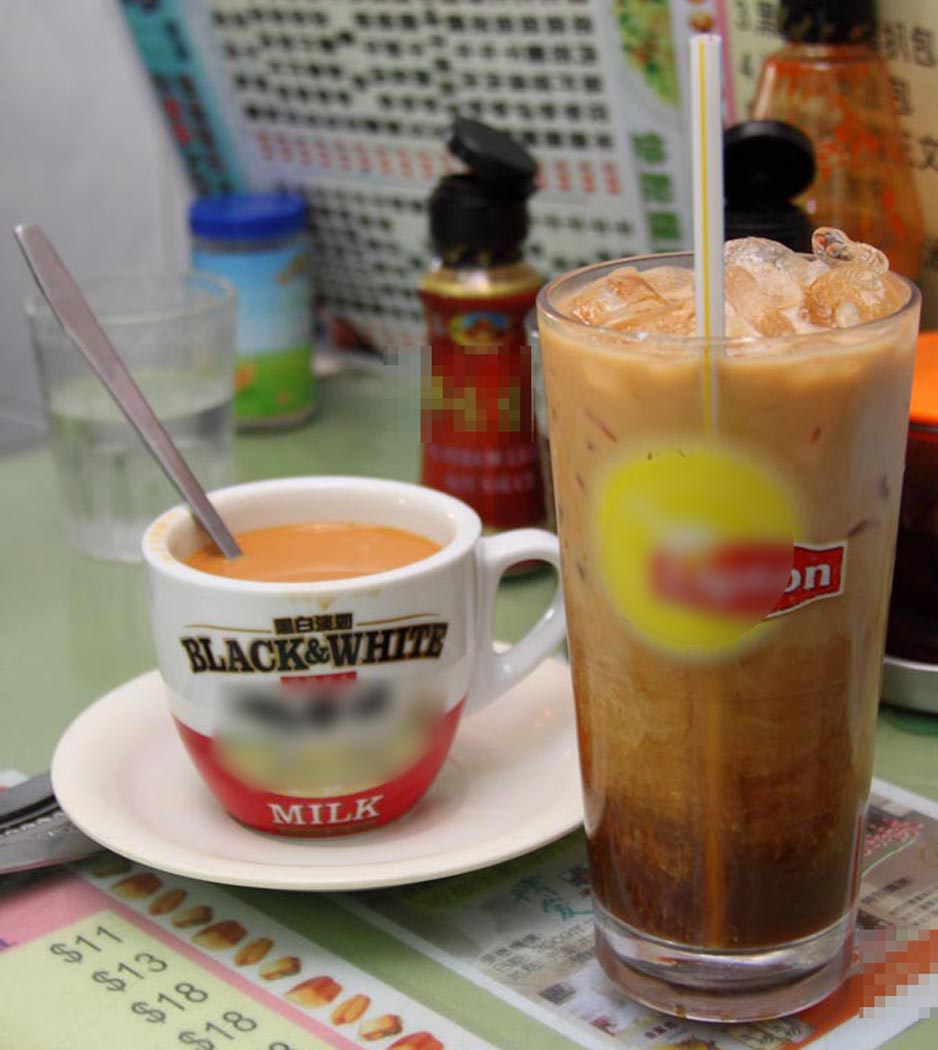
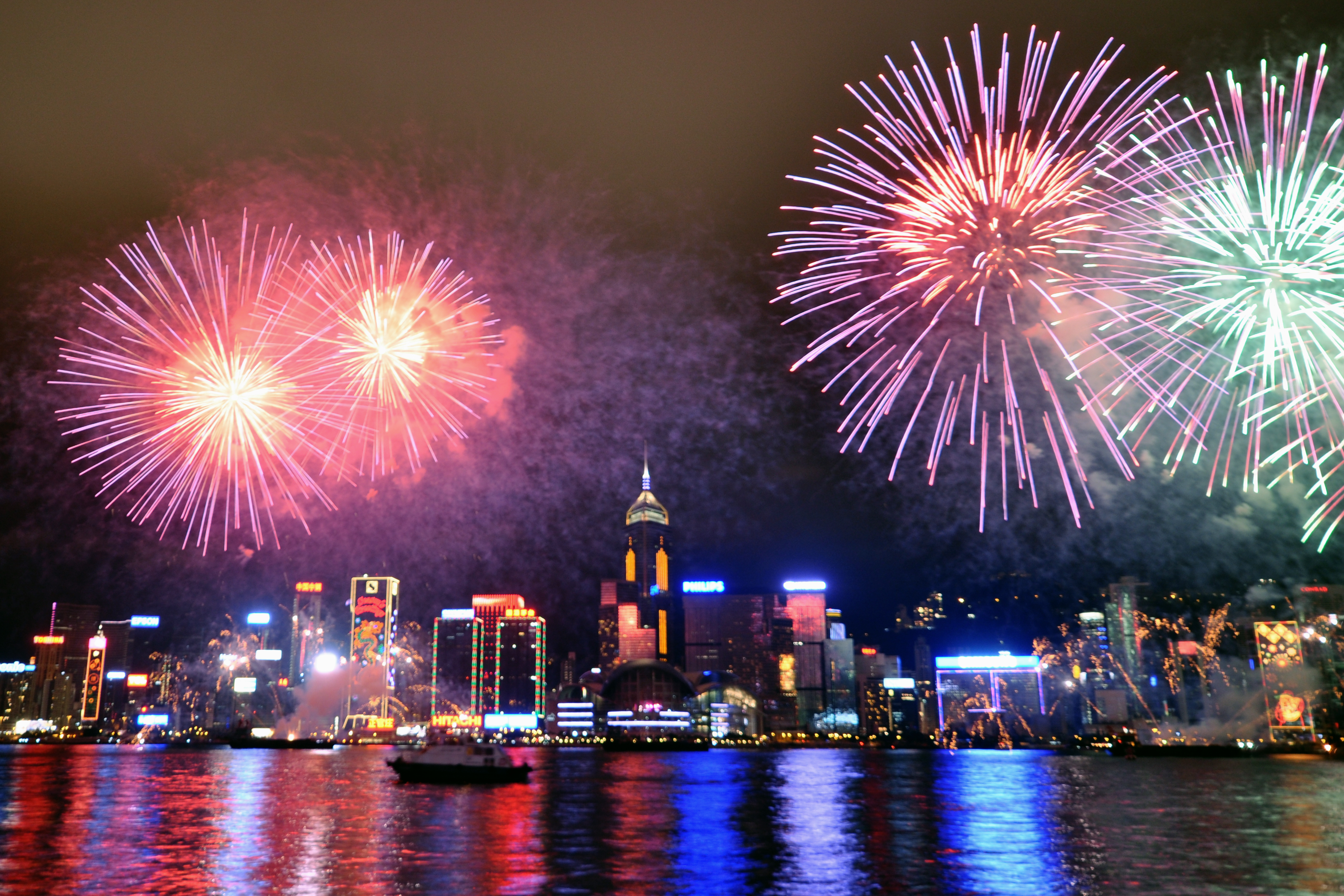
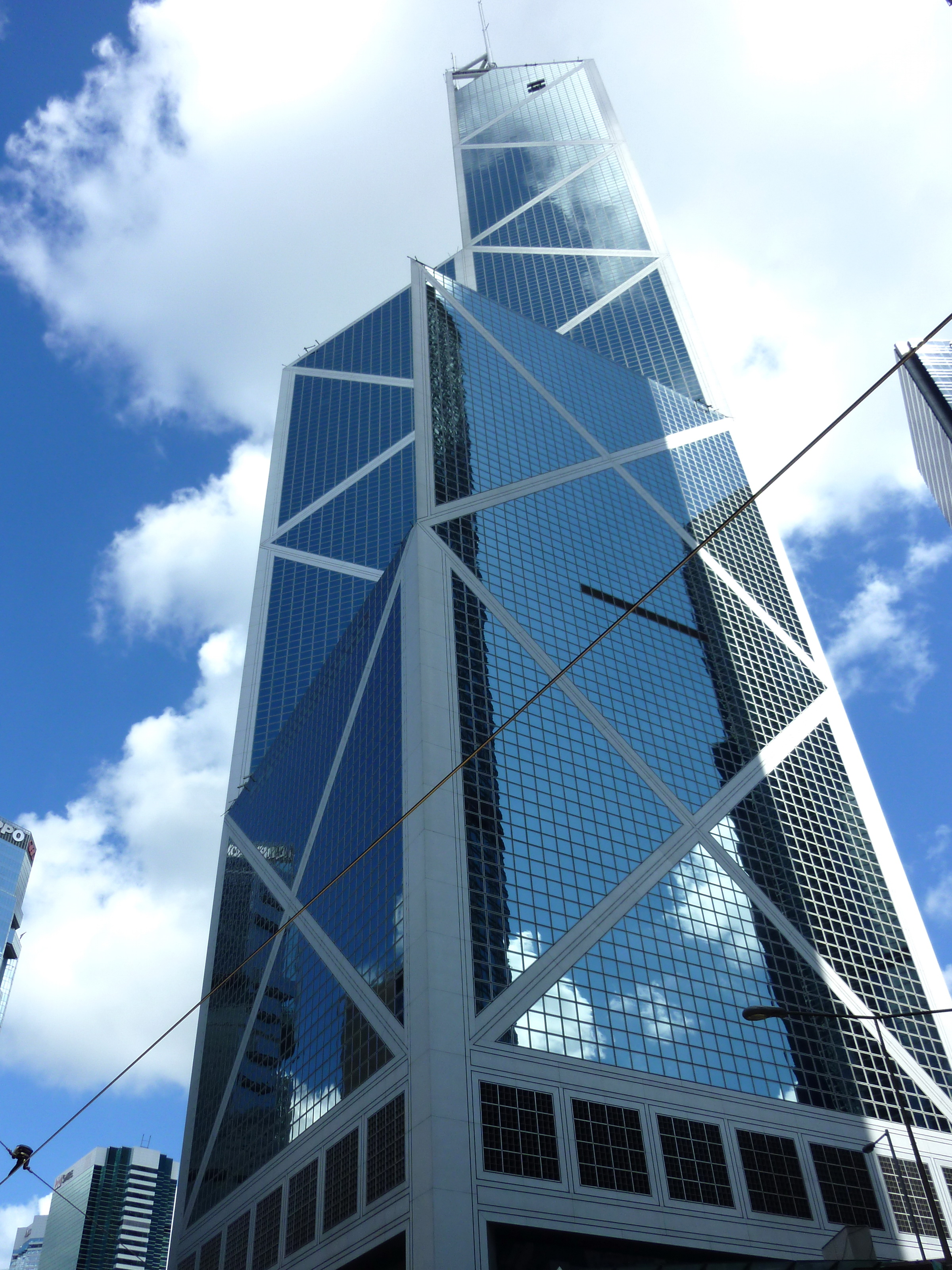
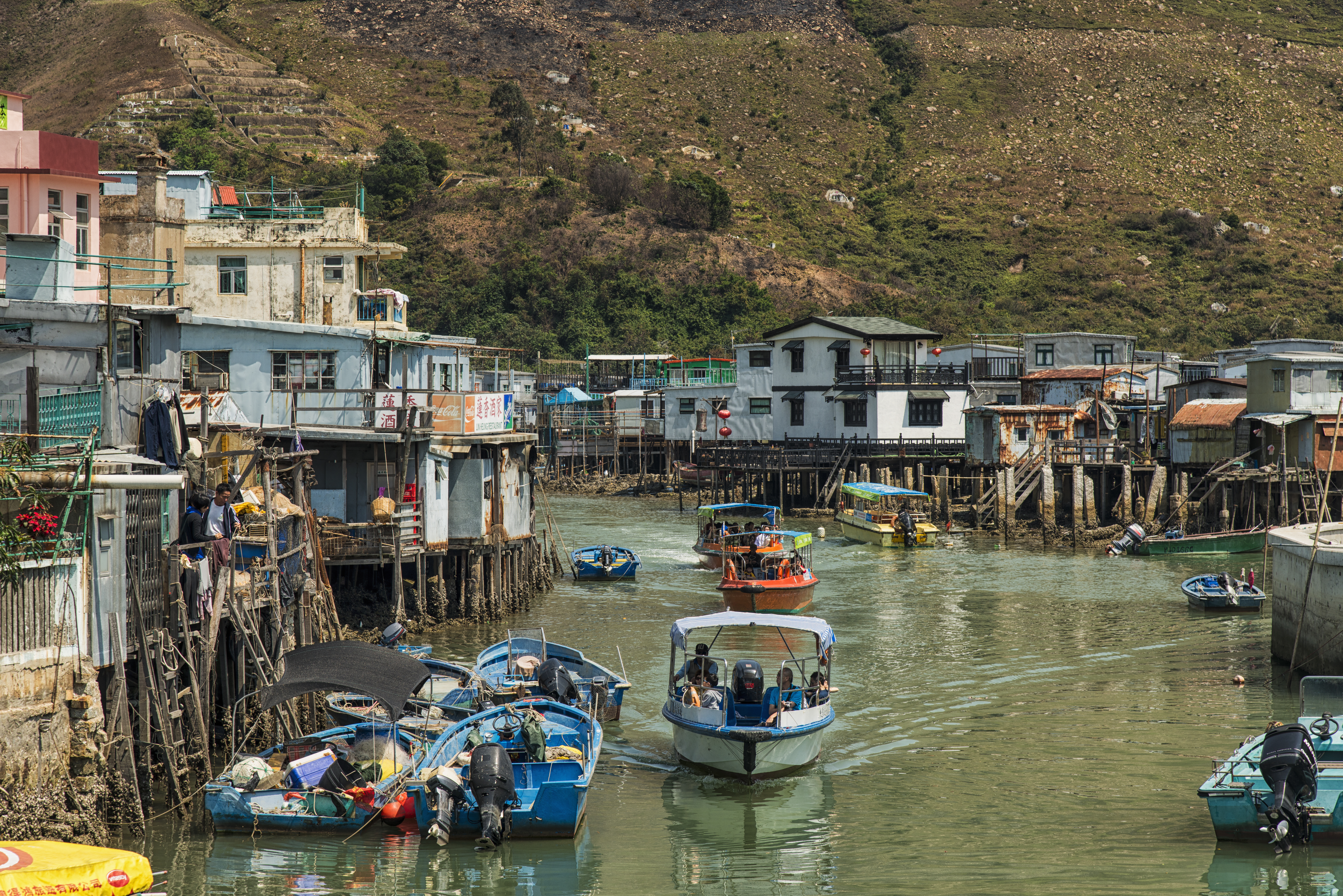
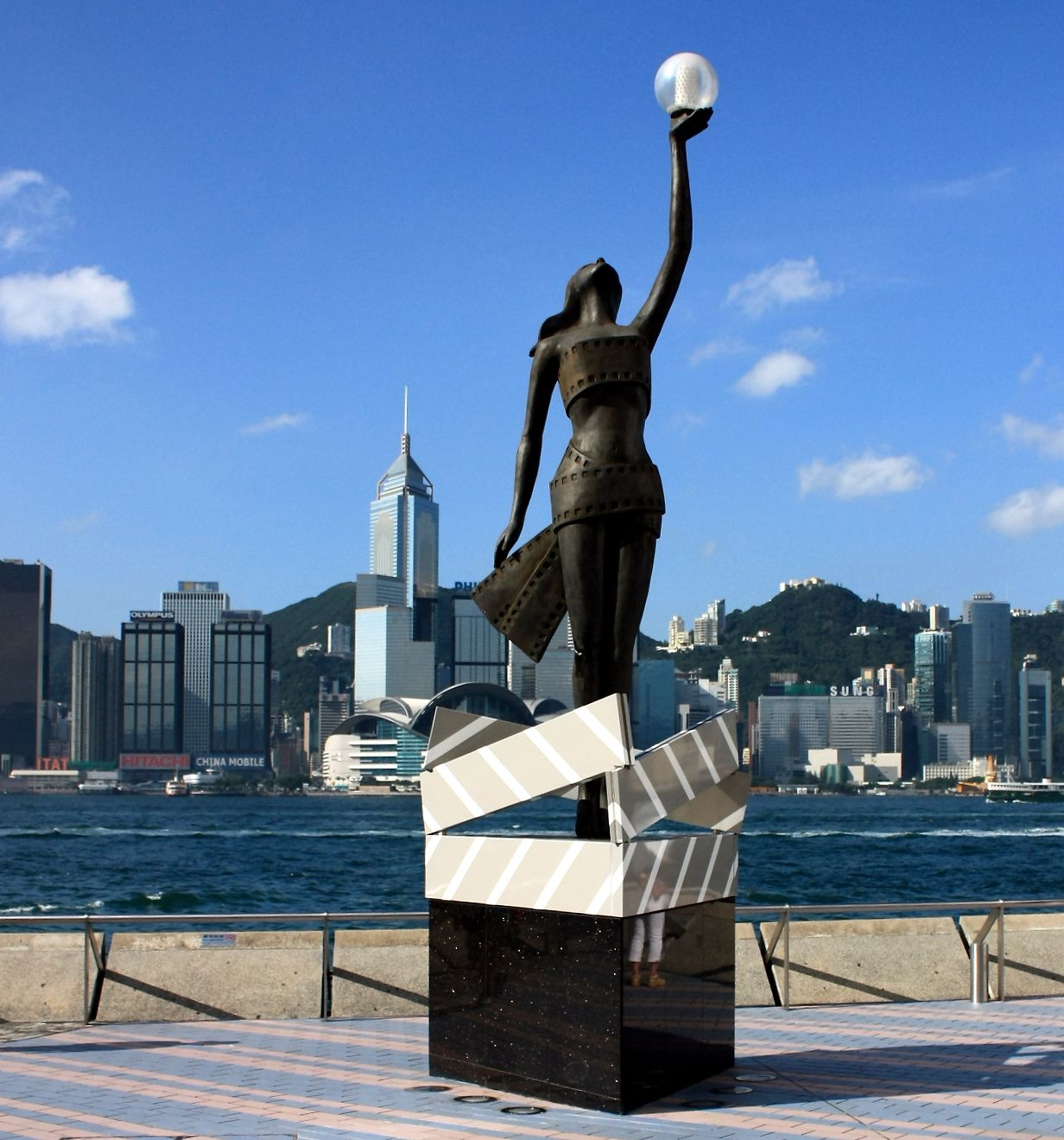
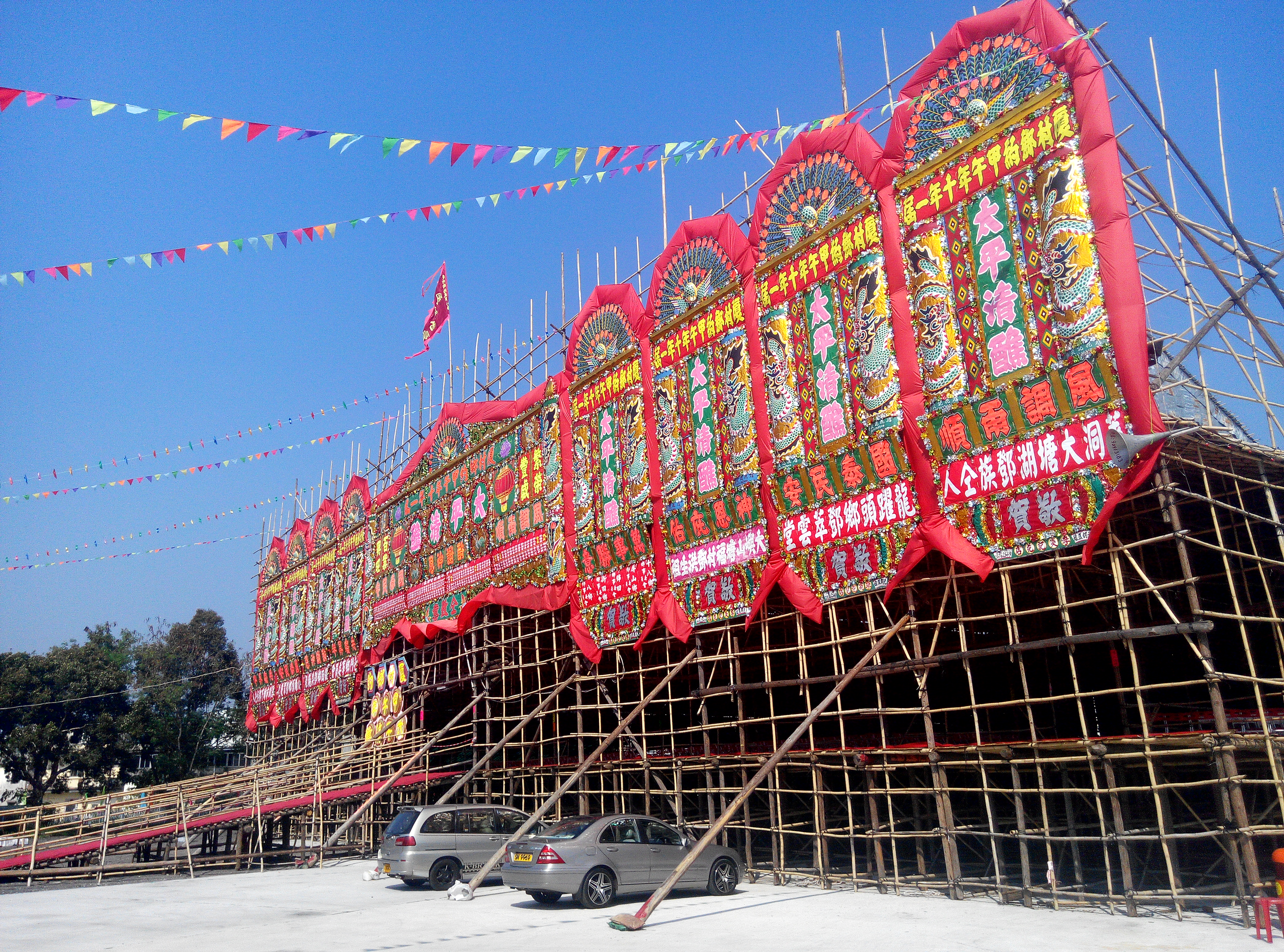
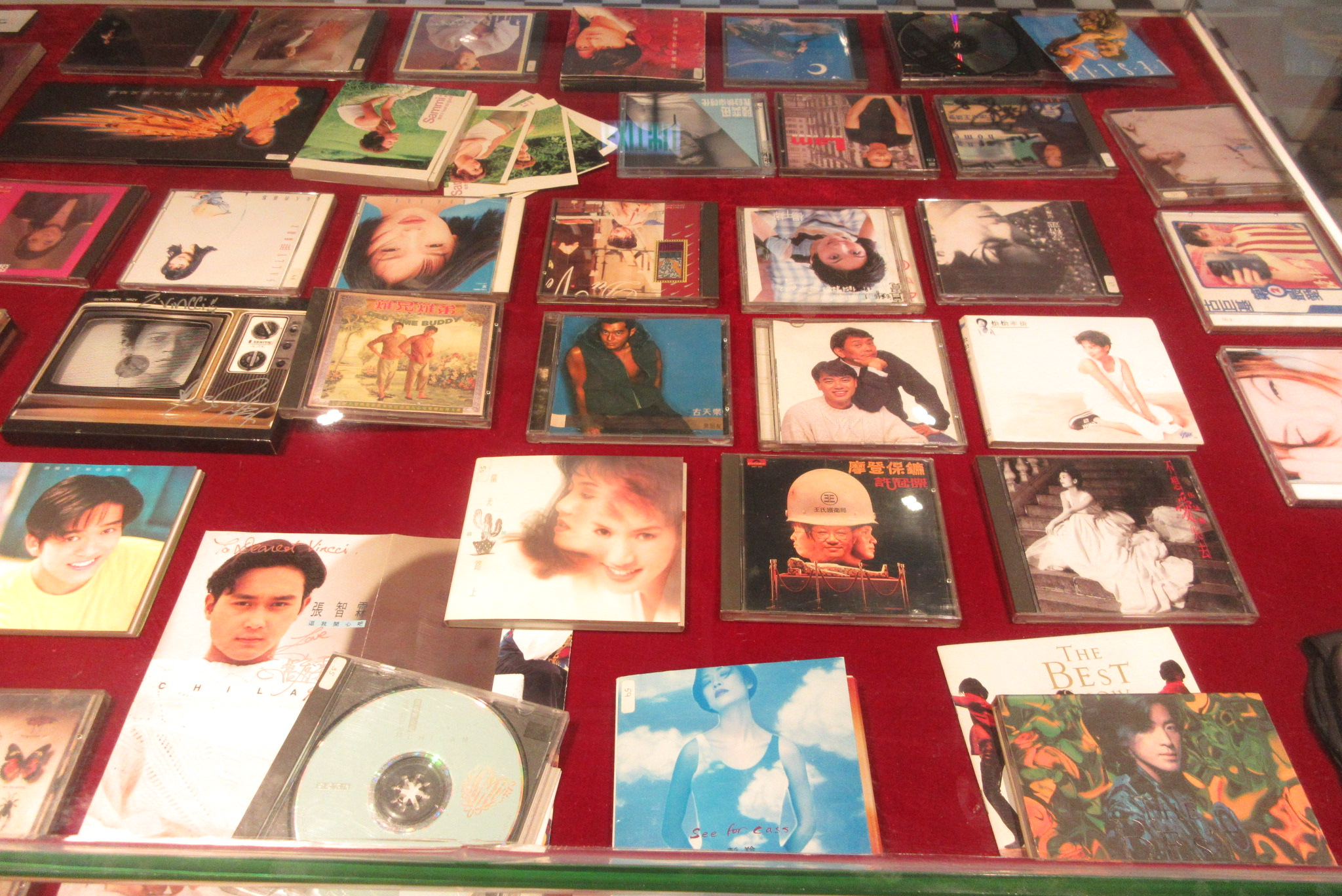
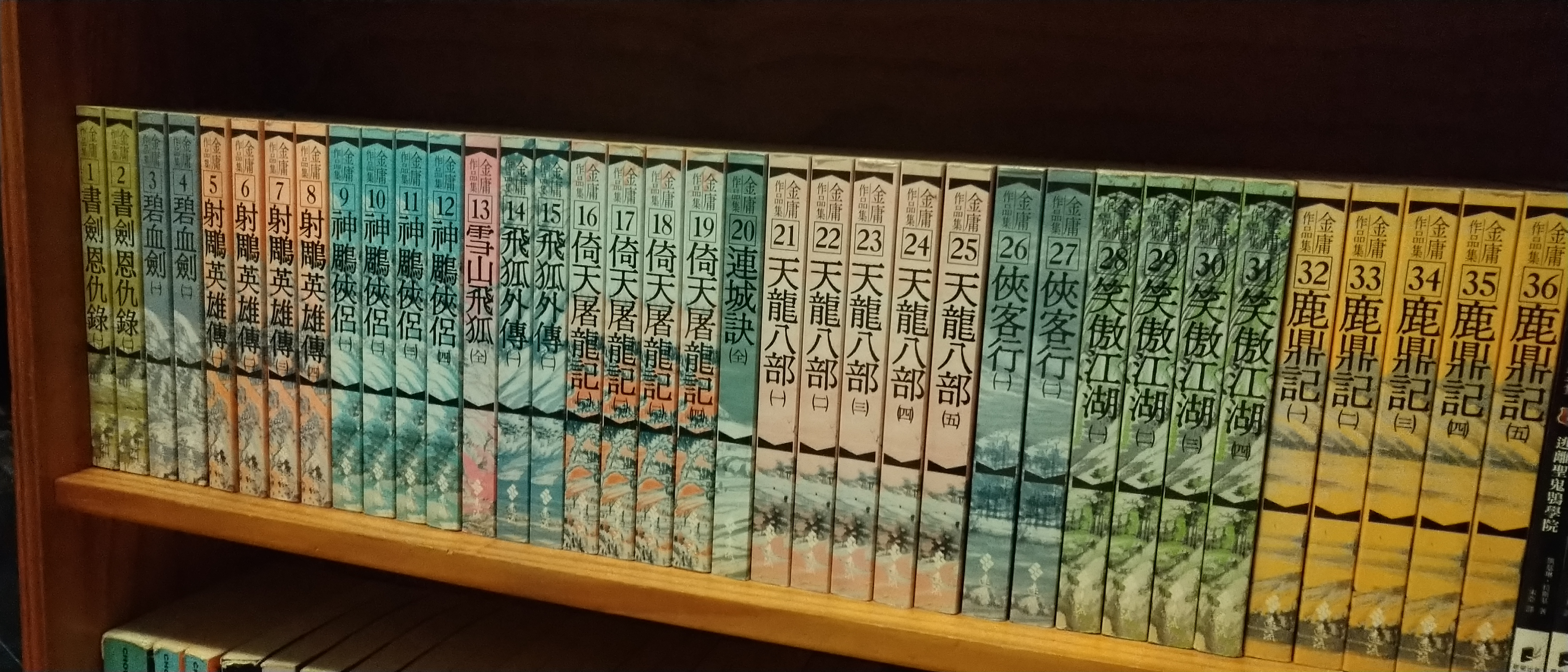
From top, left to right: 1. The neon signs on Percival Street in Causeway Bay, 2. Hong Kong-style milk tea in Cha Chaan Teng, 3. Fireworks display over Victoria Harbour, 4. Bank of China Tower, 5. Pang uk in Tai O, 6. Avenue of Stars in Tsim Sha Tsui, 7. Taai ping ching jiu, 8. Cantopop CDs, 9. Kam yung's wuxia novels

The culture of Hong Kong is a combination of Chinese and Western influences, rooted in Lingnan Cantonese heritage, and shaped by its time as a British colony (1841 to 1997). In addition to absorbing global influences, the city's culture is enriched by its indigenous communities and ethnic minorities from South and Southeast Asia.

As "Asia's World City," Hong Kong has developed a distinct identity that persists under the "one country, two systems" framework, which began after the transfer of sovereignty to China in July 1997. However, increasing Chinese control of Hong Kong has led to increasing concerns about the future of Hong Kong's culture after the end of the "one country, two systems" framework in 2047.

== Languages and writing systems ==
=== Spoken languages ===
English and Chinese are the two official languages of Hong Kong. During the British colonial era, English was the sole official language until 1978 but remained a strong second language in Hong Kong. As the majority of the population in Hong Kong are descendants of migrants from China's Canton Province, the vast majority speak standard Cantonese or other Yue Chinese varieties as a first language, with smaller numbers of speakers of Hakka Language or the Teochew dialect of Southern Min. In addition, immigrants and expatriates from the West and other Asian countries have contributed much to Hong Kong's linguistic and demographic diversity.

==== Hong Kong Cantonese ====
Cantonese (粵语) has a 1000-year-long history, and a rich heritage of traditional songs and poems. Although it is not one of the indigenous languages, it is the most widely spoken language in Hong Kong today. The Hong Kong style of Cantonese contains many loanwords from English, and also some from Japanese, due to Japan being one of Hong Kong's biggest trade partners, and the popularity of Japanese pop culture over the past few decades. Nevertheless, Hong Kong Cantonese is still mutually intelligible with the Cantonese spoken by Cantonese people from mainland China or overseas Chinese of Cantonese ancestry. Cantonese is also the primary language used in Hong Kong cultural products (pop songs, movies, etc.).

One distinctive trait of Hong Kong's Cantonese is that, due to British cultural influences, Hong Kongers are noted to have a habit of sprinkling their Cantonese with English words, resulting in a new speech pattern called "Kongish".

==== Non-Cantonese Sinitic languages ====
Hakka (Jyutping: Haak^{3} gaa^{1} waa^{2}; Traditional Chinese: 客家話), one of the indigenous languages of Hong Kong, is commonly used in many walled villages (Jyutping: Wai^{4} cyun^{1}; Traditional Chinese: 圍村) in the New Territories and in Hakka ethnic communities. Hakka – like Cantonese and Mandarin – is a member of the Chinese language family, but has close to zero mutual intelligibility with either. Hakka culture also differs from Cantonese in terms of traditional architecture, music, cuisine, and other customs.

Waitau language (Jyutping: Wai^{4} tau^{4} waa^{2}; Traditional Chinese: 圍頭話), another of Hong Kong's indigenous languages, is mostly spoken by the older generation living in walled villages in the New Territories. The Tanka people (Jyutping: Daan^{6} gaa^{1} jan^{4}; Traditional Chinese: 蜑家人) from the fishing villages are another group of Hong Kong indigenous peoples. Their language, Tanka (Jyutping: Daan^{6} gaa^{1} waa^{2}; Traditional Chinese: 蜑家話), with their own version of Cantonese, is also considered as one of Hong Kong's indigenous languages.

==== Government linguistic policy ====
Since the 1997 handover, the government has adopted the "biliterate and trilingual" (Jyutping: Loeng^{3} man^{4} saam^{1} jyu^{5}; Traditional Chinese: 兩文三語; literally: "two writing systems and three languages") policy. Under this principle, "Chinese" (somewhat ambiguously) and English must both be acknowledged as official languages, with Cantonese being accepted as the de facto official (at least spoken) variety of Chinese in Hong Kong, while also accepting the use of Mandarin (Jyutping: Pou^{2} tung^{1} waa^{2}; Traditional Chinese: 普通話) on certain occasions.

=== Writing systems ===
In terms of writing systems, Hong Kongers write using Traditional Chinese characters, which not only employ, (in diverse circumstances) variant and classical characters used since imperial times, but also cover all of the words in Mandarin-based Vernacular Chinese – the language in which government documents, and most works of literature are written. With the aid of Cantonese characters invented by Hong Kongers, the Cantonese language can now be written verbatim, and written Cantonese has become more prevalent since the turn of the 21st century, especially in less formal spheres such as Internet fora and advertisements.

== Cultural identity ==
After 156 years of rule as a separate British colony, Hong Kong's political separation from the rest of the Lingnan area has resulted in a unique local identity. Elements of traditional Cantonese culture combined with British influences have shaped every aspect of the territory, including its law, politics, education, languages, cuisine, and way of thinking. It is for this reason that locals refer to themselves as Hongkongers (Jyutping: Hoeng^{1} gong^{2} yan^{4}; Traditional Chinese: 香港人), to distinguish themselves and their culture from that of the Han Chinese from Mainland China. The sense of Hong Kong people asserting their unique identity and nationality has increased over time. This is due to the rising phenomena of conflicts between Hong Kongers and Mainlanders.

Academic Kam Louie described Hong Kong's colonial past as creating a "translation space where Chinese-ness was interpreted for 'Westerners' and Western-ness translated for Chinese."

After the handover of Hong Kong, the University of Hong Kong surveyed residents about how they defined themselves. In its June 2022 poll, 39.1% of respondents identified as Hong Konger, 31.4% as Hong Konger in China, 17.6% as Chinese, 10.9% as Chinese in Hong Kong, and 42.4% as mixed identity. In a 2023 Pew Research survey, adults in Hong Kong were most likely to identify as both Chinese and Hong Konger (53%), followed by those who identify primarily as Hong Konger (36%), and solely as Chinese (10%). The decrease in the number of people who identify as Hong Kongers may be related to the mass exodus of pro-democracy Hong Kongers, an increase in the number of mainland Chinese immigrants, and an increase in self-censorship by those still living in Hong Kong ever since the implementation of the 2020 National Security Law. Those who left often identify as Hong Kongers and/or ethnically Chinese, but not as nationally Chinese, whilst immigrants from the Mainland typically identify as nationally Chinese.

As Hong Kong developed as a fishing village into an international financial hub, many middle-class individuals residing in the colony admired and adapted to European life and culture. The presence of both European and Chinese cultures has caused some to feel the need to pick between a European identity (often perceived as being international) and a Chinese identity, or even a desire for a completely independent identity, separate from both Europe and China.

== Society ==
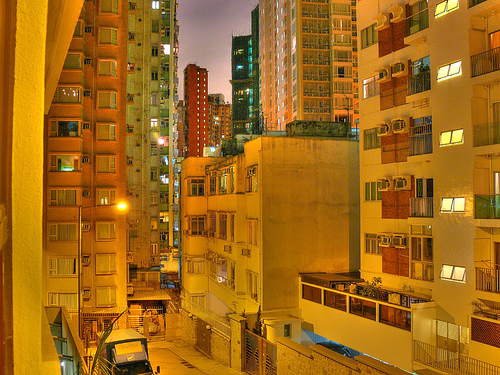
Happy Valley apartment blocks

In Hong Kong, traditional Confucian-derived values such as "family solidarity", "courtesy", and "saving face" carry significant weight in the minds of the people. Hong Kong's mainstream culture is derived from – and heavily influenced by – the Cantonese from the neighbouring province of Guangdong ("Gwongdung" in Cantonese) and their culture, which is considerably different from those of other Han Chinese people. There are also small communities of Hakka, Hokkien, Teochew, and Shanghainese people in Hong Kong.

Structurally, one of the first laws to define people's relationships was the Hong Kong Matrimonial Ordinance passed in 1972. The law set the precedent of banning concubinage and same sex marriages with a strict declaration for heterosexual relationships with one partner only. Other economic changes included families in need of assistance due to both parents being in employment. In particular, foreign domestic helpers have become an integral part of the household since the 1970s.

== Architecture ==
In terms of architecture, Hong Kong showcases Cantonese, British, and indigenous influences. The two dominant styles are Cantonese architecture and British architecture. The former's popularity is stems from the presence of a large number of residents with Cantonese ancestry, whilst the latter is most commonly seen on government buildings due to British rule of the colony. Hong Kong's indigenous peoples also have their own styles, namely walled villages, and stilt houses built on water (pang uk). The major architectural styles found in Hong Kong include:

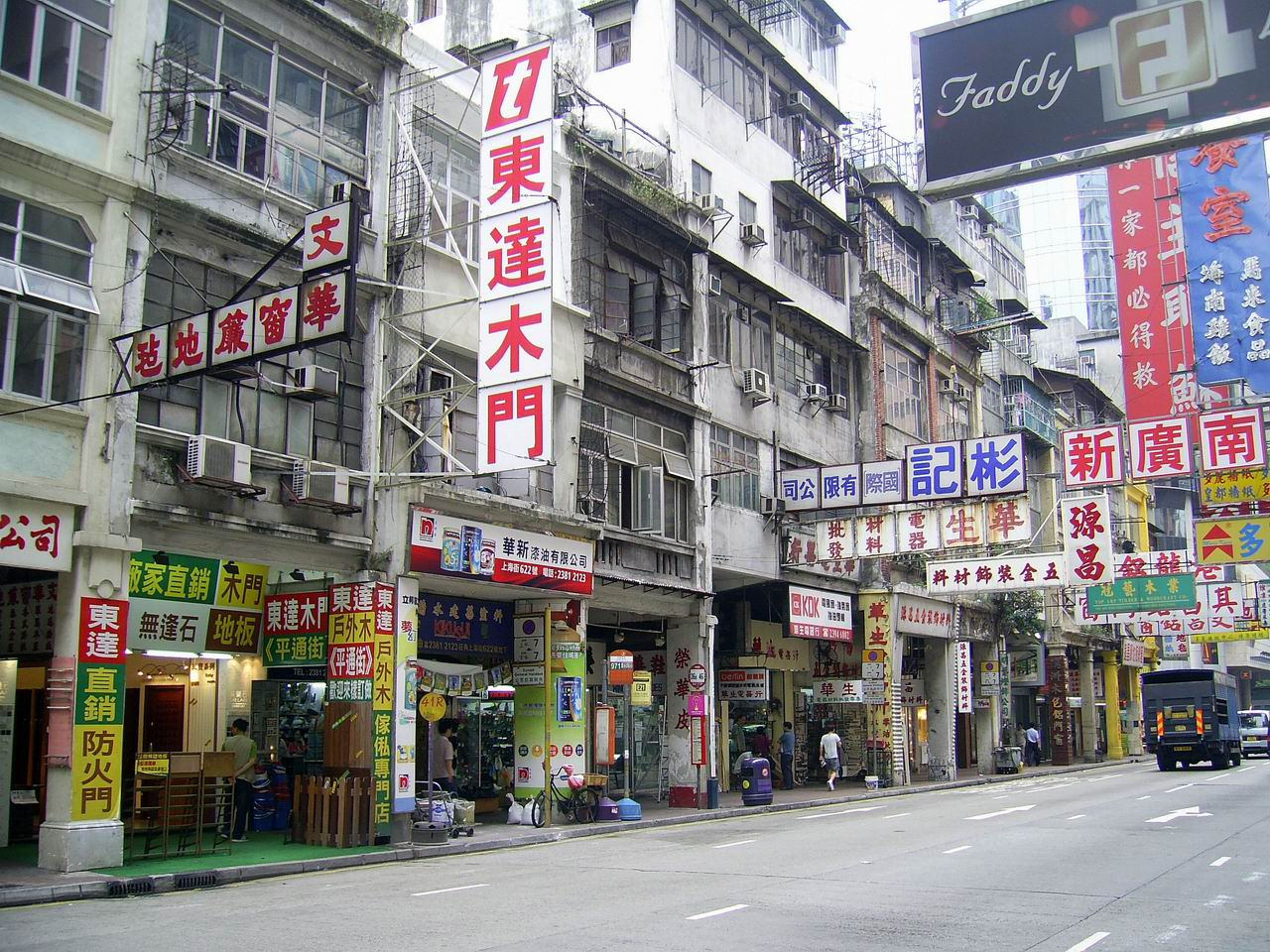
Tong laus in Mongkok. Whist tong laus can be seen throughout Lingnan, they are especially common in Hong Kong.

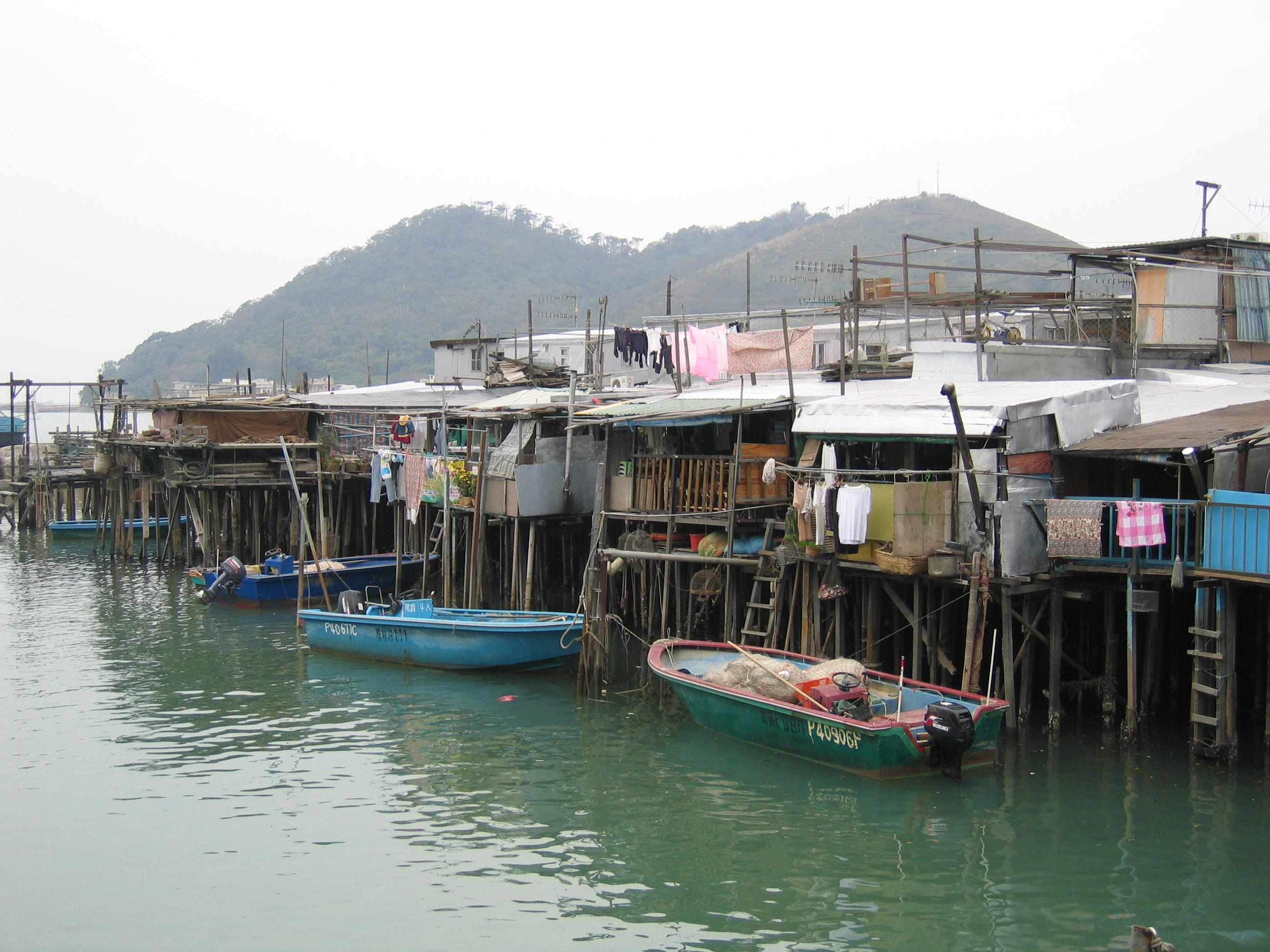
Pang uk in Tai O; Pang uks were built by the Tanka people, who had the tradition of living above water, and regarding it as an honour.

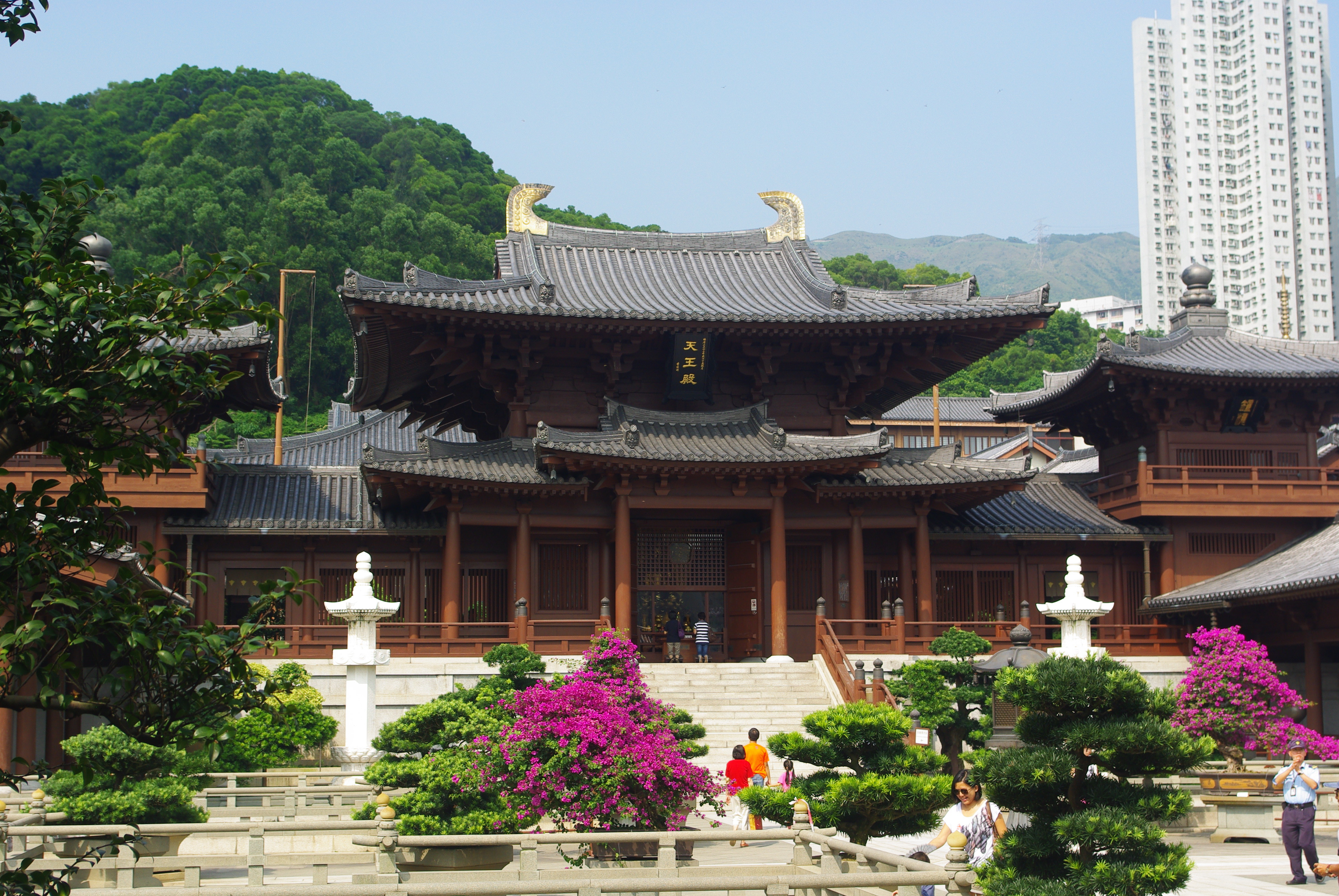
The Chi Lin Nunnery adopted Tang-style architecture.

Hong Kong also contains some Chinese Renaissance style architecture, such as King Yin Lei on 45 Stubbs Road, and St. Mary's Church of Sheng Kung Hui (Anglican Communion) on Hong Kong Island.

== Visual arts ==
=== Fine arts ===
Hong Kong supports a variety of artistic activities. The Hong Kong Arts Centre in Wan Chai offers a variety of performance venues and galleries, and is supportive of other arts organisations, whist the Oi! arts centre, located inside the historic Royal Hong Kong Yacht Club, aims to promote visual arts in Hong Kong by providing a platform for art exhibitions, fora, and other art-related activities. M+ focuses on 20th and 21st century visual culture, including design and architecture. At an international level, Hong Kong hosts Art Basel, which is the leading contemporary arts fair in Asia, and is the centre for new media art with venues such as Microwave International New Media Arts Festival and Videotage. Even in less urban areas of the city, Hong Kongers have also built creative oases, such as the Cattle Depot Artist Village and the Fo Tan artistic community. Contemporary visual artists from Hong Kong include Nadim Abbas, Amy Cheung, Choi Yan-chi, Ming Fay, Lai Cheuk Wah Sarah, Tsang Tsou Choi, Ho Sin Tung, and Eric Siu.

Hong Kong has recently seen a boom in independent art groups.

==== Cantonese fine arts ====
Hong Kong hosts several styles of Lingnan (Cantonese) fine arts, including the Lingnan style of painting and bonsai. For example, Yeung Sin-sum, who is venerated as "the last master of the Lingnan school of painting", is based (though not born) in Hong Kong. Hong Kong also has an active club supporting Lingnan penjing (English website).

Hong Kong is home to modern ink painting, which infuses traditional Chinese ink painting with experimental techniques and approaches. Prominent artists in this field include Lui Shou-kwan, Liu Kuo-sung, and Eddy Chan.

=== Graffiti art ===
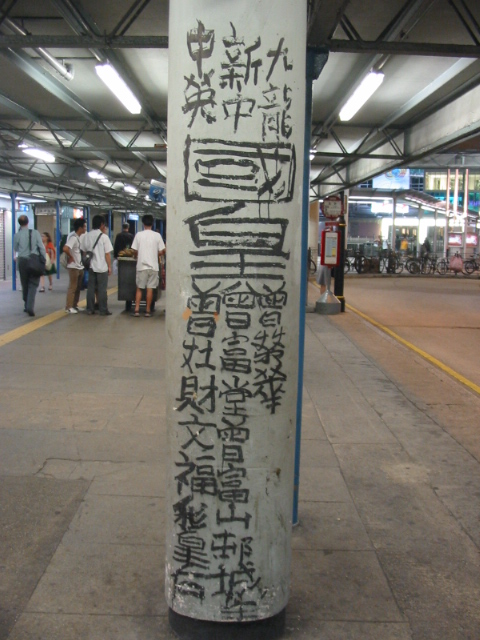
The graffiti work of Tsang Tsou Choi, the "King of Kowloon"

Graffiti art (Jyutping: Tou^{4} aa^{1}; Traditional Chinese: 塗鴉) is abundant on Hong Kong streets. The Hong Kong style of graffiti art ranges from calligraphy using Chinese characters to satires against politicians. It is technically illegal in Hong Kong, but lax law enforcement results in the proliferation of graffiti art. Nowadays, graffiti art is omnipresent on the streets of Hong Kong, especially in the busier districts such as Mongkok. The work of Tsang Tsou Choi, one of the most prominent Hong Kong graffiti artists, even had his work sold for more than HK$50,000.

Nowadays, many Hong Kongers have begun to regard graffiti art as a symbol of their city, and host activities promoting graffiti art.

Cover of Tin Ha

=== Comics ===
Hong Kong comics (Jyutping: Hoeng^{1} gong^{2} maan^{6} waa^{2}; Traditional Chinese: 香港漫畫) are Hong Kong-based comic books which provided a means of visual of expression long before the arrival of television. Whist readership has fluctuated over the decades, the art form is one of the most consistent in terms of providing highly affordable visual entertainment. Hong Kong comics are regularly available at news stands on most street corners. Characters such as Old Master Q, Chinese Hero, and many others have showcased Han Chinese artwork and stories (especially Cantonese ones). Japanese manga have also been translated and fused into local comic libraries.

=== Canton porcelain ===
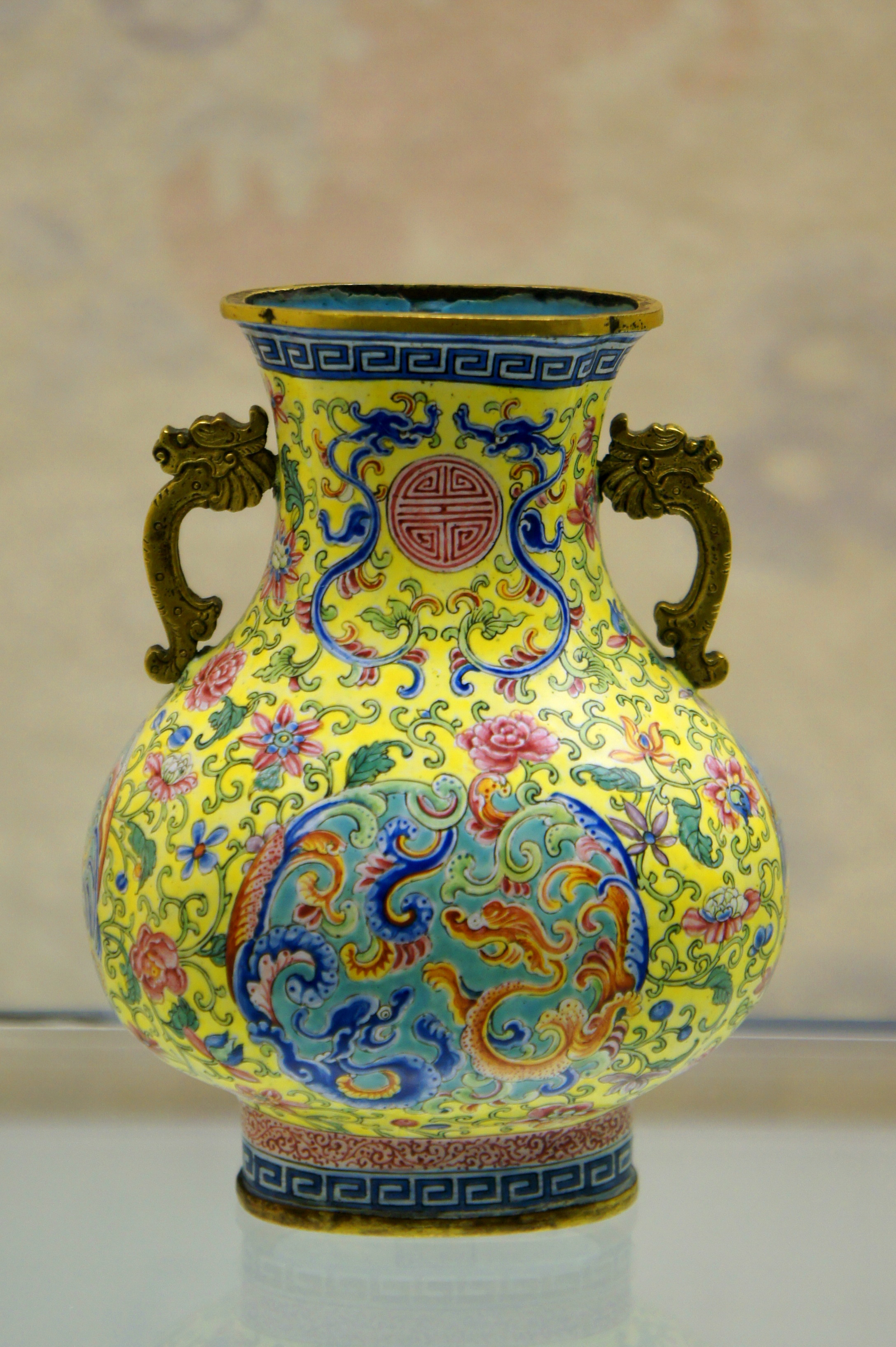
"Vase with floral scroll design", on show at the Hong Kong Museum of Art

Hong Kongers, like their fellow Cantonese, have also dabbled in Canton porcelain. Canton porcelain (Jyutping: Gwong^{2} coi^{2}; Traditional Chinese: 廣彩), also called "Cantonese porcelain", is a distinct style of porcelain which originated in Canton City, the centre of Lingnan culture. It employs a specific set of techniques which enable various colours to be applied to white porcelain, resulting in porcelain products that are unusually bright and colourful. Hong Kongers have produced Canton porcelain since the early 20th century, and exported their wares throughout the Western world. Nowadays, however, as Hong Kong has shifted its focus to service and finance, it is mostly hobbyists who produce this style of porcelain art.

== Performing arts ==
=== Music ===
==== Cantonese opera ====
Cantonese opera is one of the major categories in Han Chinese opera, originating in southern China's Cantonese culture. Like all branches of Han Chinese opera, it is an art form involving music, singing, martial arts, acrobatics, and acting. Features particular to Cantonese opera include the heavy use of makeup and headdresses, and a specific set of musical instruments. Hong Kong also has a distinct style of Cantonese opera (Jyutping: San^{4} gung^{1} hei^{3}; Traditional Chinese: 神功戲, literally "opera using the effort of the gods") specifically played during the Cheung Chau Bun Festival. The art form carries a national identity that goes as far back as the first wave of immigrants to arrive in the 1950s. Sunbeam Theatre is one of the theatres which continues to uphold this tradition in the present day.

Cantonese opera in Hong Kong
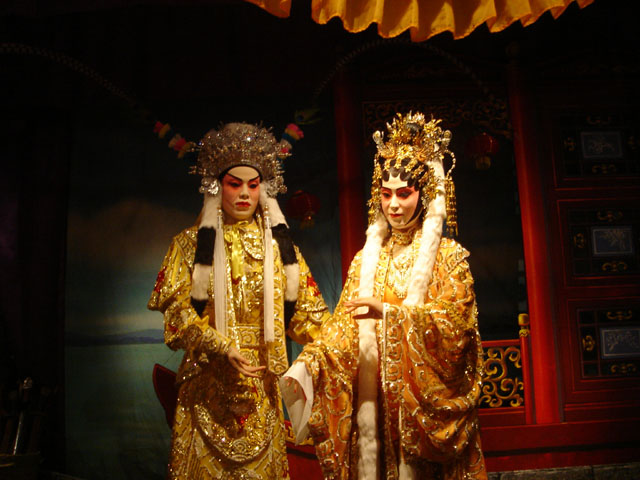
A Cantonese opera scene depicted at the Hong Kong Museum of History

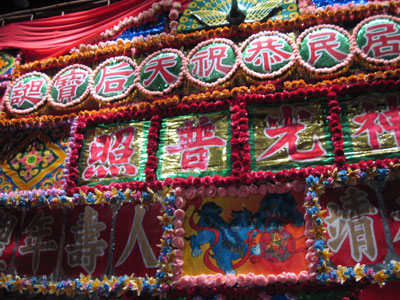
A Cantonese opera performed for Mazu's Birthday

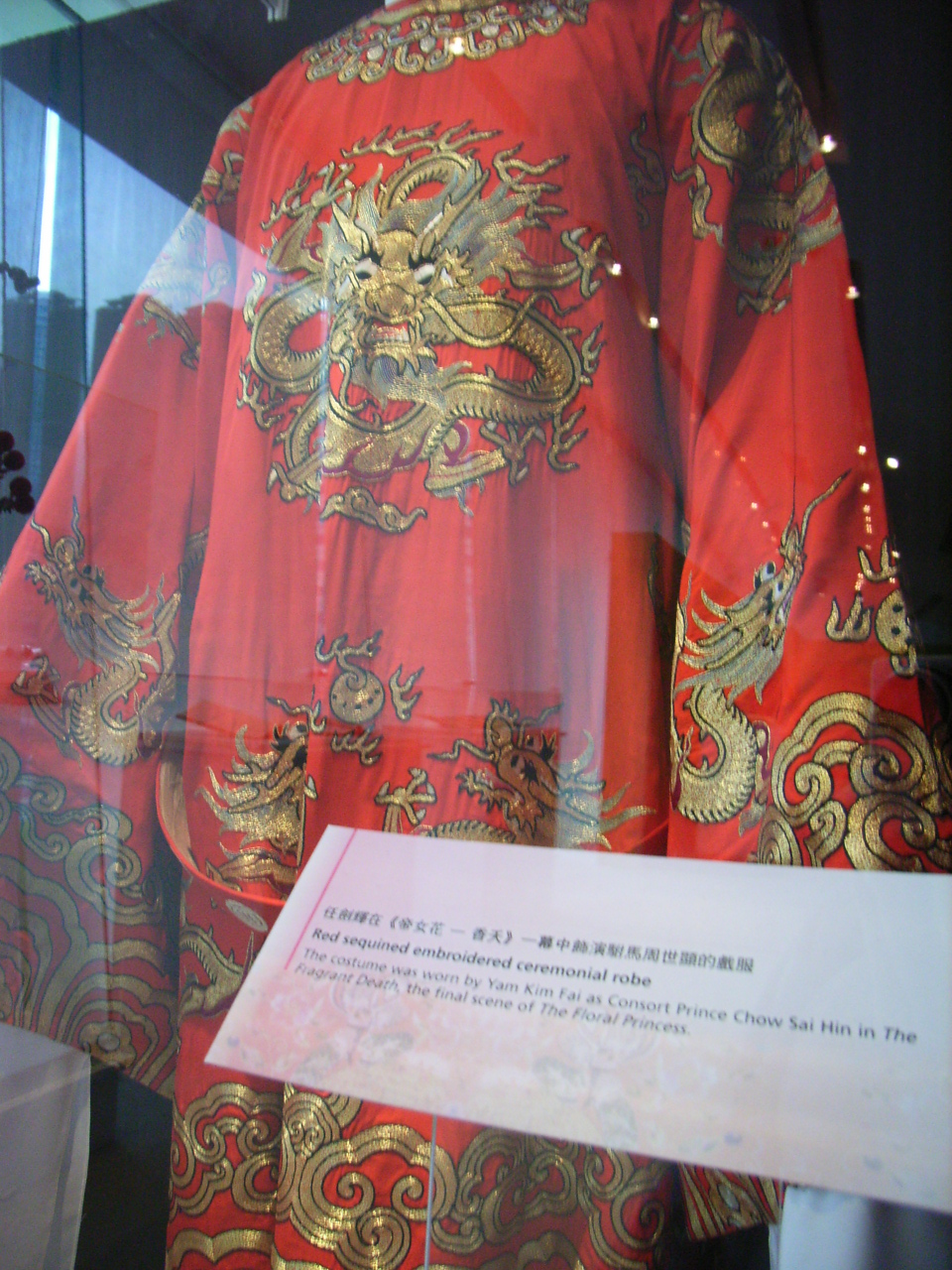
A costume used in Cantonese opera

==== Pop music ====
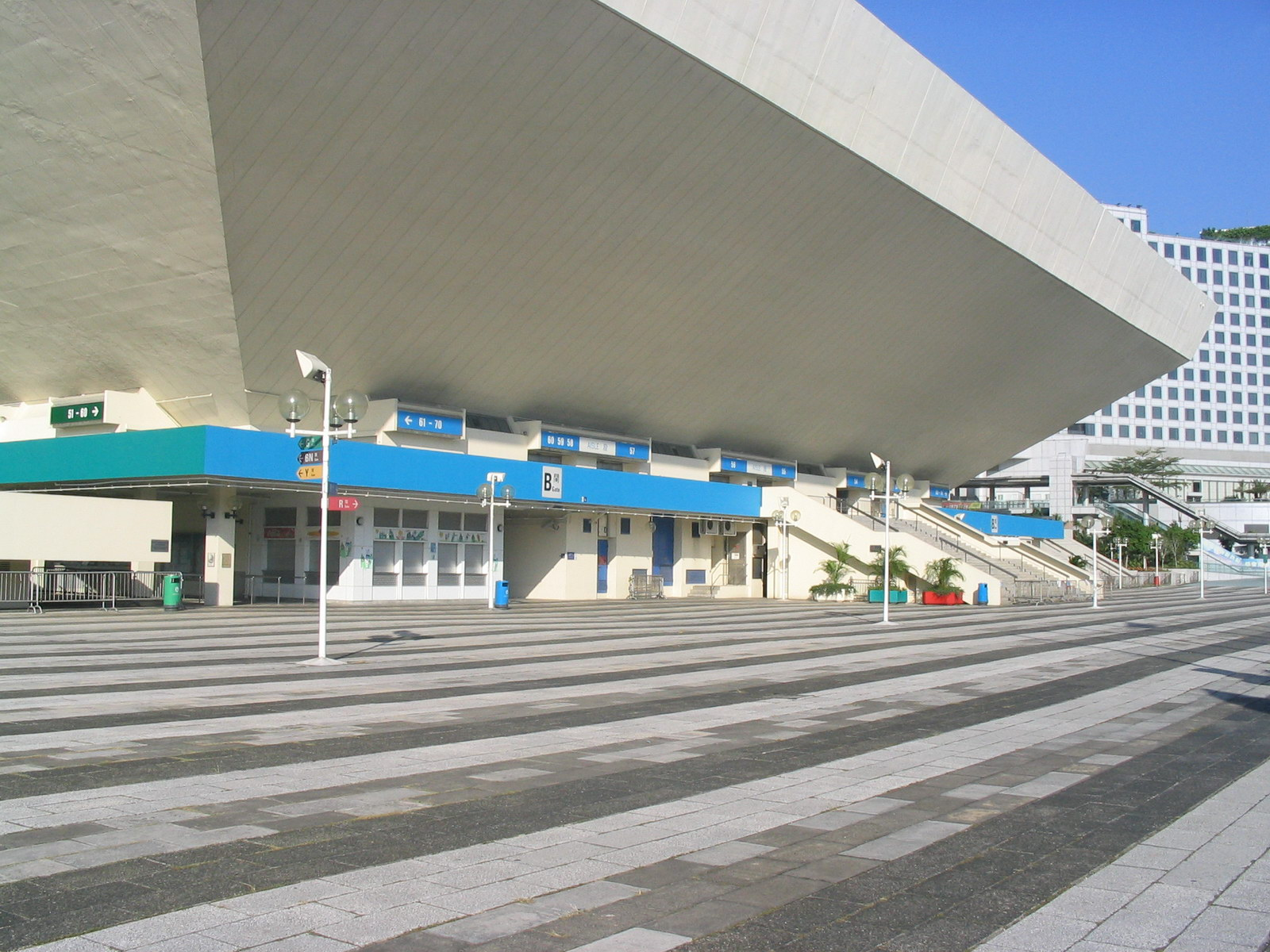
Hong Kong Coliseum also is a Cantopop concert venue

Cantopop (Jyutping: Jyut^{6} jyu^{5} lau^{4} hang^{4} kuk^{1}; Traditional Chinese: 粵語流行曲), also called HK-pop, has dominated – and become synonymous with – local music culture since its birth in Hong Kong. However, the gradual decline of Cantopop in the mid-1990s has given rise to other forms of pop culture, mainly Hong Kong English pop, as well as Japanese, Korean, and Western pop music. Nevertheless, Cantopop enjoys considerable popularity in Cantonese communities across the world. Nowadays, the global influence of Mandarin has slightly influenced the style, with Mandopop from Taiwan gaining ground. Most artists are essentially multilingual, singing in both Cantonese and Mandarin.

==== Classical music ====
Western classical music is also widely appreciated by Hong Kongers. Many schools provide free musical instrument lessons to their students. There are also quite a number of professional, amateur, and student orchestras performing regularly. The best known orchestra is the Hong Kong Philharmonic Orchestra . The Orchestra was originally called the Sino-British Orchestra; it was renamed the Hong Kong Philharmonic Orchestra in 1957, and became a professional orchestra in 1974. The Orchestra is currently under the direction of Music Director Jaap van Zweden. It won the Gramophone Orchestra of the Year Award 2019.

Another well known orchestra is Hong Kong Sinfonietta (Chinese: 香港小交響樂團). Established in 1990, one of its main objectives is to promote classical music to the general public. In 2002, the conductor and music director Wing-sie Yip (葉詠詩) joined the orchestra as the first woman conductor in Hong Kong. She has broadened the base of classical music lovers in the city.

In 1989, a group of doctors from the Hong Kong Medical Association with a passion for classical music, formed an amateur orchestra called the Hong Kong Doctors Orchestra. Since then, they have performed annually at various charity events. Their aim is to care for patients not just through medicine but also through music.

=== Theatres ===
Theatres in Hong Kong include:

- Aurora Theatre Hong Kong
- Hong Kong Cultural Centre
- Ko Shan Theatre
- Lyric Theatre
- Star Hall
- Sunbeam Theatre
- Tea House Theatre
- The Hub
- Xiqu Centre, West Kowloon
- Yau Ma Tei Theatre

=== Cinema ===
The Hong Kong cinema (Jyutping: Gong^{2} caan^{2} pin^{3}; Cantonese: 港產片) industry has been one of the most successful worldwide, especially during the second half of the 20th century. Having received international recognition for directors such as Wong Kar-wai, it has sustained a moderate level of prominence despite a severe slump starting in the mid-1990s. Martial artists and film stars such as Jackie Chan and Bruce Lee are known globally, especially in Chinese settlements overseas, where most expats of Cantonese descent enjoy Cantonese-language entertainment. Many Hong Kong actors and directors have made the transition to Hollywood, including Chow Yun-fat and John Woo.

==== Hong Kong humour ====
The cinema of Hong Kong is noted for its specific brand of martial arts movies and comedy. The latter is said to have its own style of humour, which has been termed "Hong Kong humour" (Jyutping: Gong^{2} sik^{1} jau^{1} mak^{6}; Traditional Chinese: 港式幽默) - alluding to British humour. It is said to be characterised by black comedy (specifically: Mo lei tau) and may have been influenced by British humour.

=== Television dramas ===
Locally-produced television dramas by the free-to-air networks TVB and ATV enjoyed a fair degree of popularity between the 1970s and mid-2000s. They have contributed to a unique cultural identity among the Hong Kongers, and served as a cultural resource for the Cantonese community worldwide. Many of the well known dramas were exported to South East Asian countries, the US, Canada, and the UK in the form of videotapes, and later as VCDs & DVDs. Hong Kong was once the powerhouse for producing large numbers of soap operas in the Cantonese dialect. However, the gradual demise of ATV and (eventually) TVB, owing to the decline in quality of their TV series and dramas, resulted in greater preference for those produced in China and other East Asian nations – namely South Korean, Japanese, and Taiwanese TV shows, which now dominate the latest TV trends in Hong Kong.

=== Animation ===
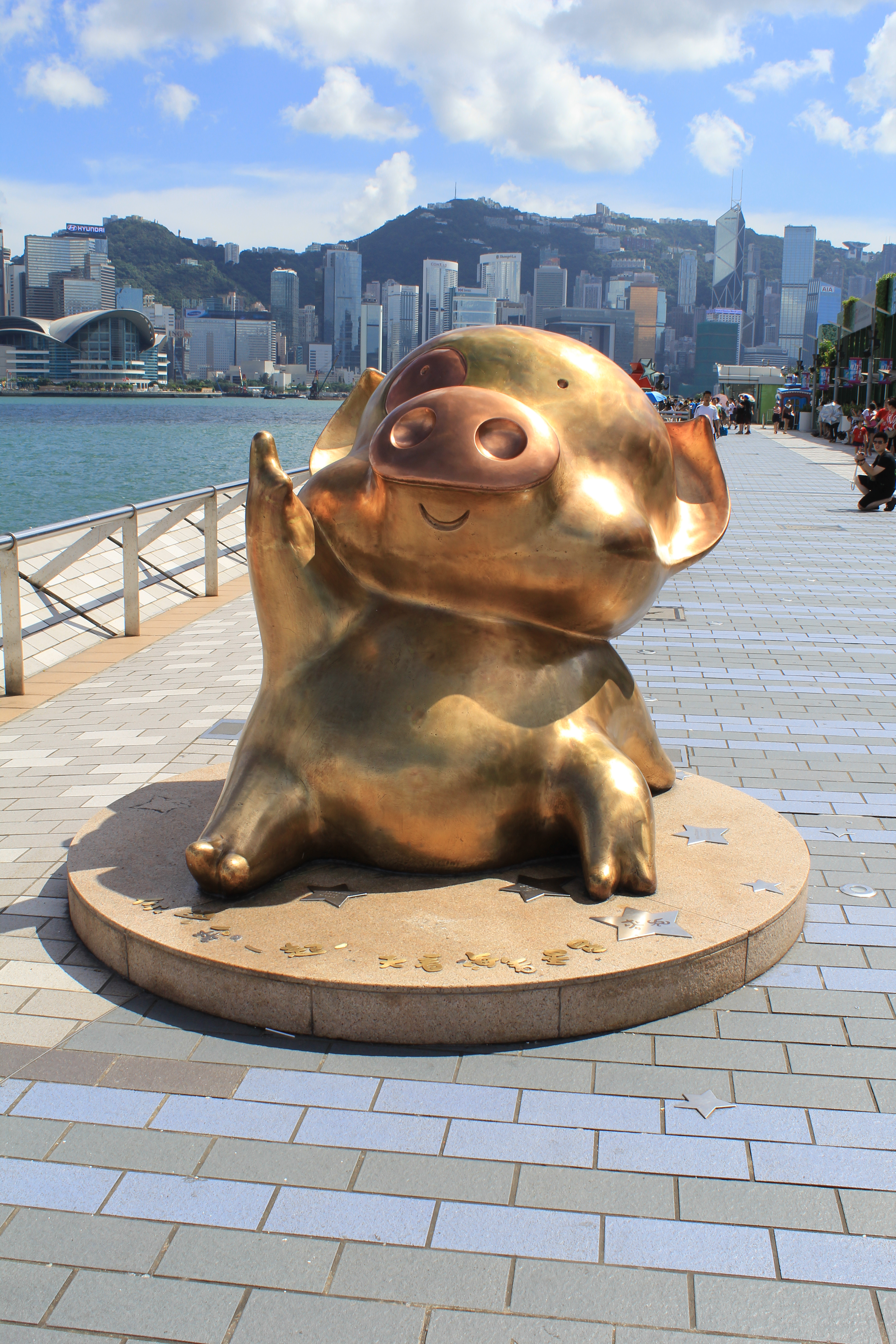
A statue of McDull, a Hong Konge cartoon character. He has become a well known throughout East Asia.

Whilst there is an endless supply of Japanese anime, and Disney animations, Hong Kong has been trying hard to revitalise its local animation industry. It has made contributions in recent years with productions like A Chinese Ghost Story: The Tsui Hark Animation and DragonBlade. Most notably, companies like Imagi Animation Studios, located directly in the territory, are now pushing 3D-CG animations into the market.

McDull is arguably the most prominent product of Hong Kong animation.

=== Other performing arts ===
In addition to the above, Hong Kong has different kinds of performing arts, including drama, dance, and theatre. Hong Kong is home to the first full-time comedy club in Asia: The TakeOut Comedy Club Hong Kong. There are also many government-supported theatre companies. In 2014, Hong Kong held its first outdoor Shakespeare festival: Shakespeare in the Port which was staged at Cyberport.

The following performing artist groups (which either originate from Hong Kong, or are based in the territory) have enjoyed modest success outside Asia:

- Hong Kong Chinese Orchestra
- Hong Kong Ballet
- Hong Kong Philharmonic Orchestra
- Hong Kong Sinfonietta

== Literary culture ==
=== Print media ===
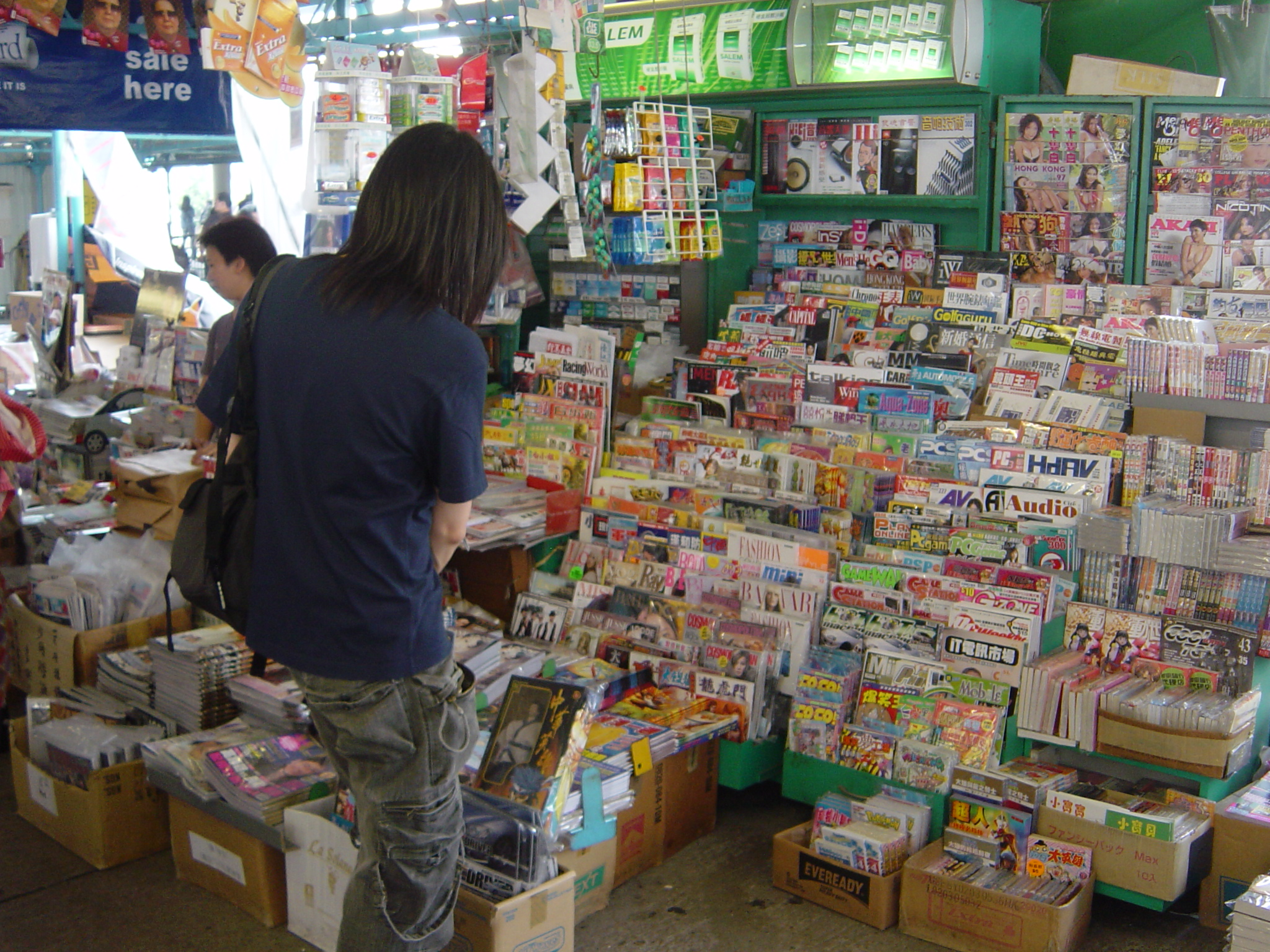
News stand at Star Ferry Pier

Magazine and newspaper publishers distribute and print in numerous languages, most notably Vernacular Chinese and English. Tabloids (and occasionally broadsheet newspapers) rely heavily on sensationalism and celebrity gossip – a practice that is generally criticised. The media is relatively free from government interference compared to that of mainland China, and newspapers are often politicised; some have even shown skepticism toward the Chinese government in Beijing.

=== Broadcasting ===
In the early 2000s, Hong Kong had two main broadcast television stations: TVB and ATV. The latter was closed in 2016 after a long series of financial issues, and the refusal of the government to renew its broadcasting licence. The former, launched in 1967, was the territory's first free-to-air commercial television station, and is currently the leading television network in the territory – its signal can also be received in Guangdong Province and Macau (via cable). Paid cable and satellite television have also been widespread. Hong Kong's soap dramas, comedy series, and a variety of shows have reached mass audiences throughout the Chinese-speaking world – primarily the Cantonese diaspora. Many international and pan-Asian broadcasters are also based in Hong Kong, including News Corporation's STAR TV.

=== Hong Kong literature ===
Hong Kong literature traces its roots to the early 20th century, when successive waves of migrants from Mainland China (mostly of Cantonese ancestry) moved to the British-controlled territory in an attempt to escape from the then war-torn China. At first, the educated among these migrants felt much resentment for having to stay in Hong Kong, dubbing it the "land of Southern Barbarians". Many of their works revolved around expressing such sentiments. Nowadays, Hong Kong literature has been fully developed, with numerous prolific writers producing novels and short stories. Hong Kong literature is characterised by its heavy use of daily life scenarios – this makes romance, humour, and satire popular genres, although Hong Kong has also produced several prominent wuxia (Jyutping: Mou^{5} haap^{6}; Traditional Chinese: 武俠) and science fiction writers.

Notable writers of Hong Kong literature include:

Amy Cheung, a writer of romance and short stories; she is best known for Women on the Breadfruit Tree and For Love or Money.
Chip Tsao, known for writing short stories and discourses on Western culture.
Jin Yong, a renowned wuxia writer; several of his novels have been made into films and animations.
Ni Kuang, a science fiction writer; he also has had several of his novels made into films.

==== Cantonese literature ====
Lingnan literature was traditionally written in classical Chinese, rather than the people's spoken languages. Despite attempts to create vernacular forms of writing in the late 19th century, the Greater China region still tends to use Vernacular Chinese, a writing system based on Mandarin, not Cantonese (i.e., the people's language in the Lingnan region), in writing. Hong Kong is no exception. The vast majority of works of Hong Kong literature were composed in Vernacular Chinese. However, starting from the 21st century, Hong Kong – as a cultural centre in the region – has developed a complete writing system for Cantonese. Some writers in the territory now advocate composing literature in written Cantonese.

== Cuisine ==
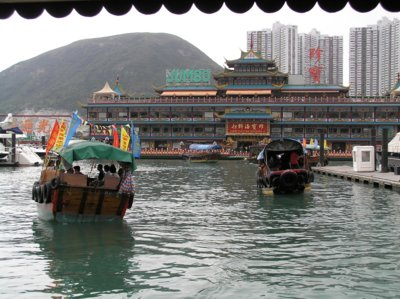
Aberdeen Harbour; There, one could once catch a sampan to the Jumbo Floating Restaurant (which has since been shut down and sunk).

Cuisine holds an important place in Hong Kong culture. From dim sum, hot pot (da been lo), fast food, to the rarest delicacies, Hong Kong carries the reputable label of "Gourmet Paradise" and "World's Fair of Food". Hong Kong cuisine, which is influenced by both Western (mainly British) and Chinese (mainly Cantonese) cultures, is very diverse. Despite these influences, it is not simply a collection of cuisine from other regions of the world, but also has its own style. An example would be Dai pai dong, a casual outdoor dining restaurant, primarily providing Cantonese food.

Another type of casual Hong Kong eating establishment is the Cha chaan teng (literally "tea restaurant"), which evolved from the bing sutt ("ice room"). In these "tea restaurants", various meals are served throughout the day for breakfast, lunch, afternoon tea, and dinner. The menu consists of Hong Kong favorites which show influences of eastern (mostly Cantonese) and British cuisines. Frequent items include Hong Kong-style French toast, yuenyeung, silk-stocking milk tea, tomato soup with macaroni and BBQ pork, pineapple buns, and iced lemon tea.

Another Hong Kong speciality is street foods. Before the 1990s, street foods were offered by hawkers, who are vendors with little carts moving around the streets and selling their traditional snacks. The best known Hong Kong street foods are curry fish balls, soya-braised cuttlefish, stinky tofu, curry pig skins, pig-blood jelly, red bean, green bean sweet soup, siu mai, etc. However, after the 1990s, due to food safety regulations, traffic laws and the like, hawkers started to disappear. They were then replaced by licensed food stores making similar types of snacks. These traditional street foods are still delightful for many Hong Kong people and tourists alike.

There are many special foods and drinks in Hong Kong. Hong Kong-style Cantonese pastries are made by most bakeries in Hong Kong, like egg tarts, pineapple buns, wife cake, jin deui, roasted pork buns, and cream buns. Even pastel de nata, a Portuguese egg tart, is being sold in KFC, the fast-food chain restaurant. Poon choi, a cuisine from Hong Kong's walled villages, also sees popularity among Hong Kongers.

=== Gallery ===
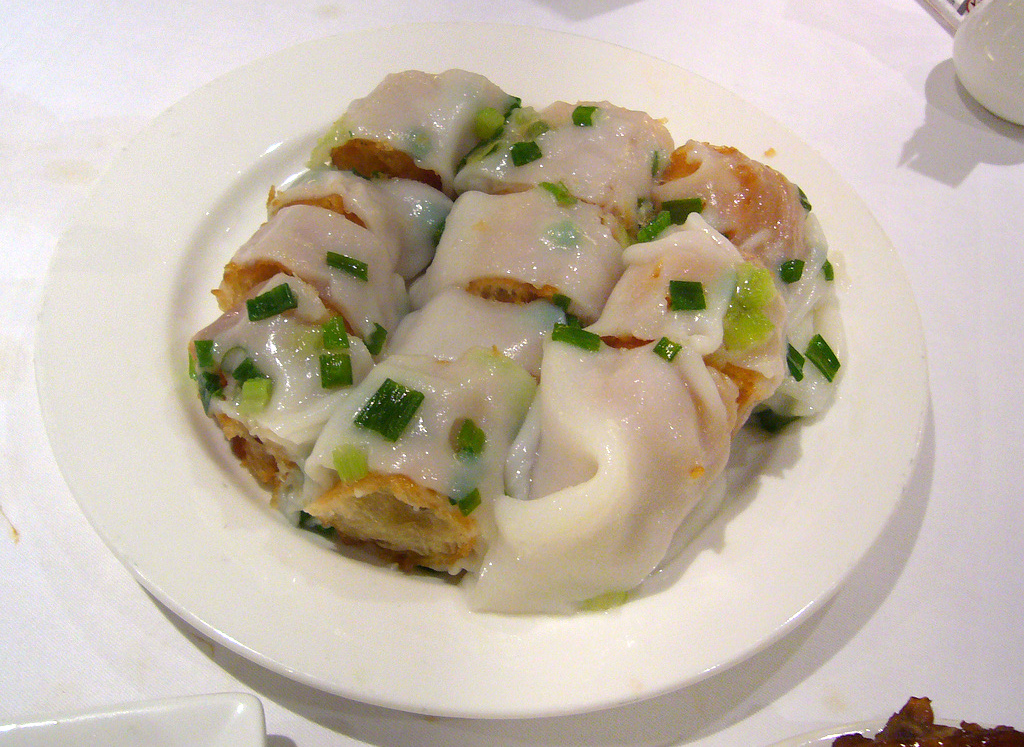
Za leung is often eaten in Cantonese breakfast.

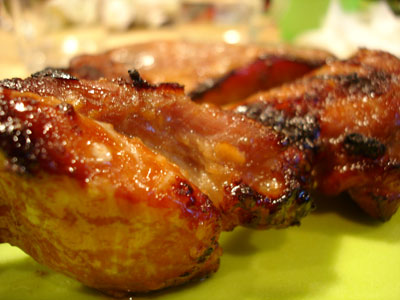
BBQ pork is a common dish in Cantonese cuisine.

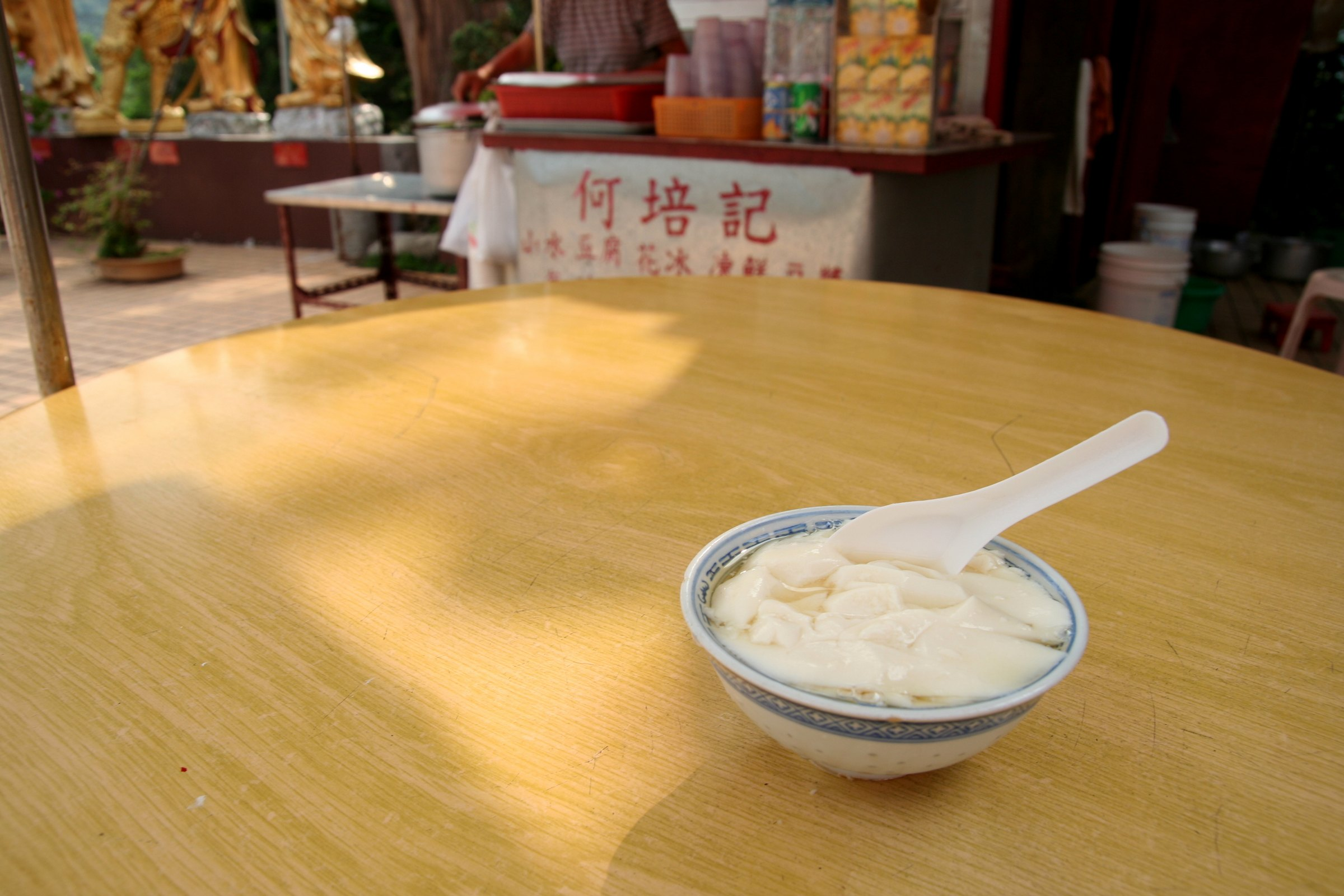
Tong sui is popular among Hong Kongers as well.

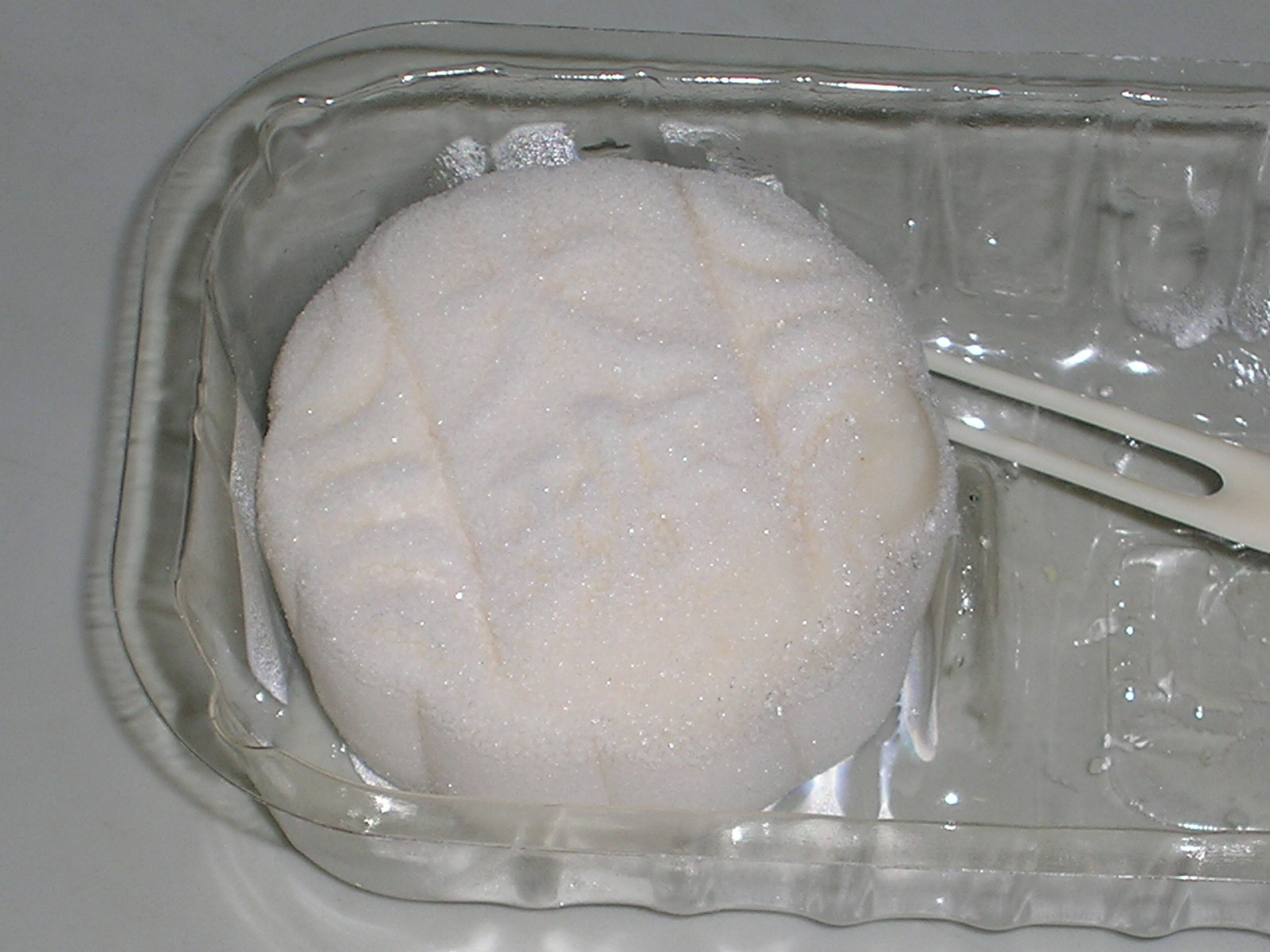
Mooncakes found in Hong Kong are mostly Cantonese-style, though Hong Kongers also have local inventions such as snow skin mooncake.

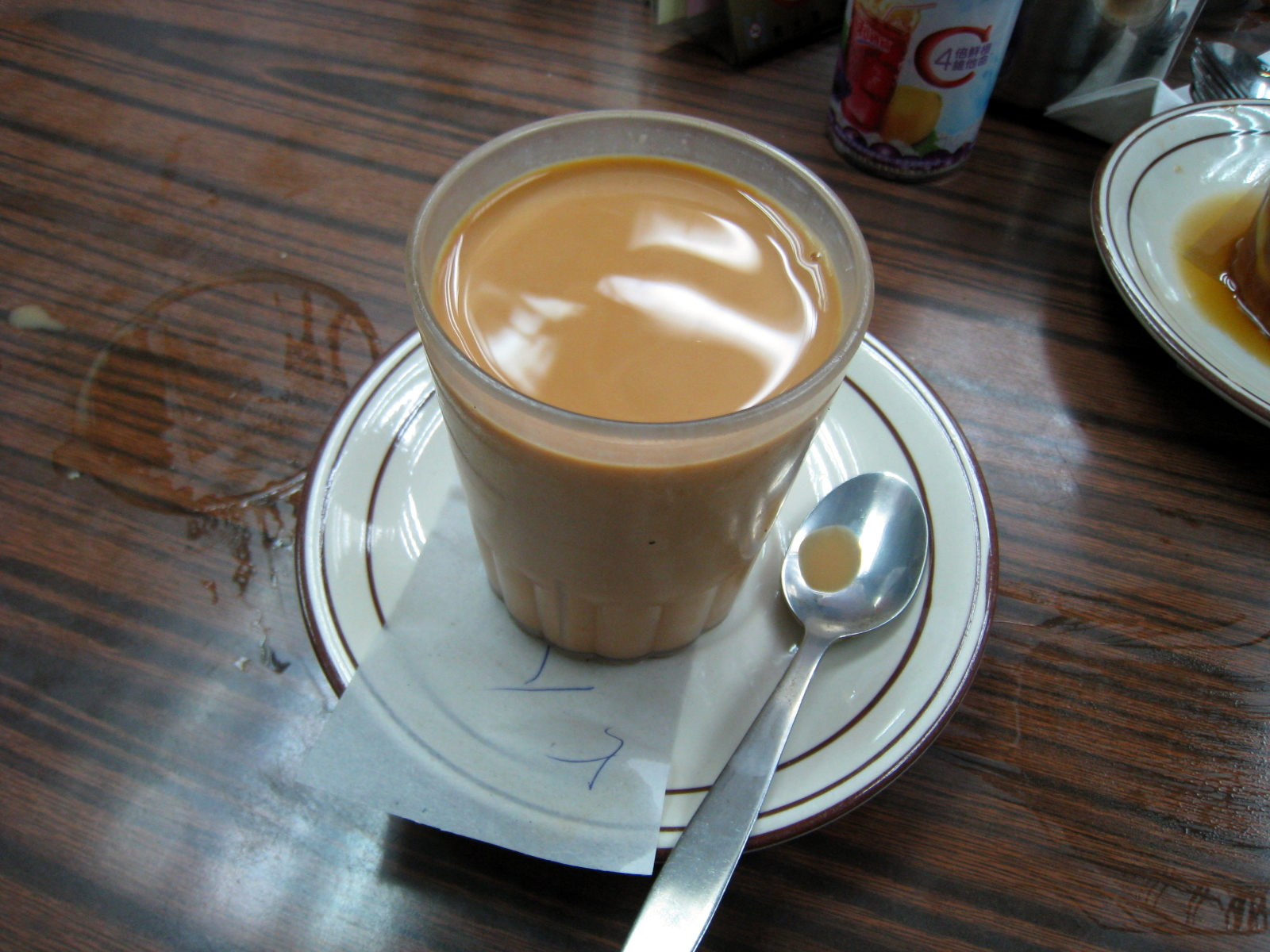
A cup of Hong Kong-style milk tea, Not purely British nor traditionally Chinese, it's a local invention forged by resourcefulness and cultural openness-exactly the spirit of Hong Kong.

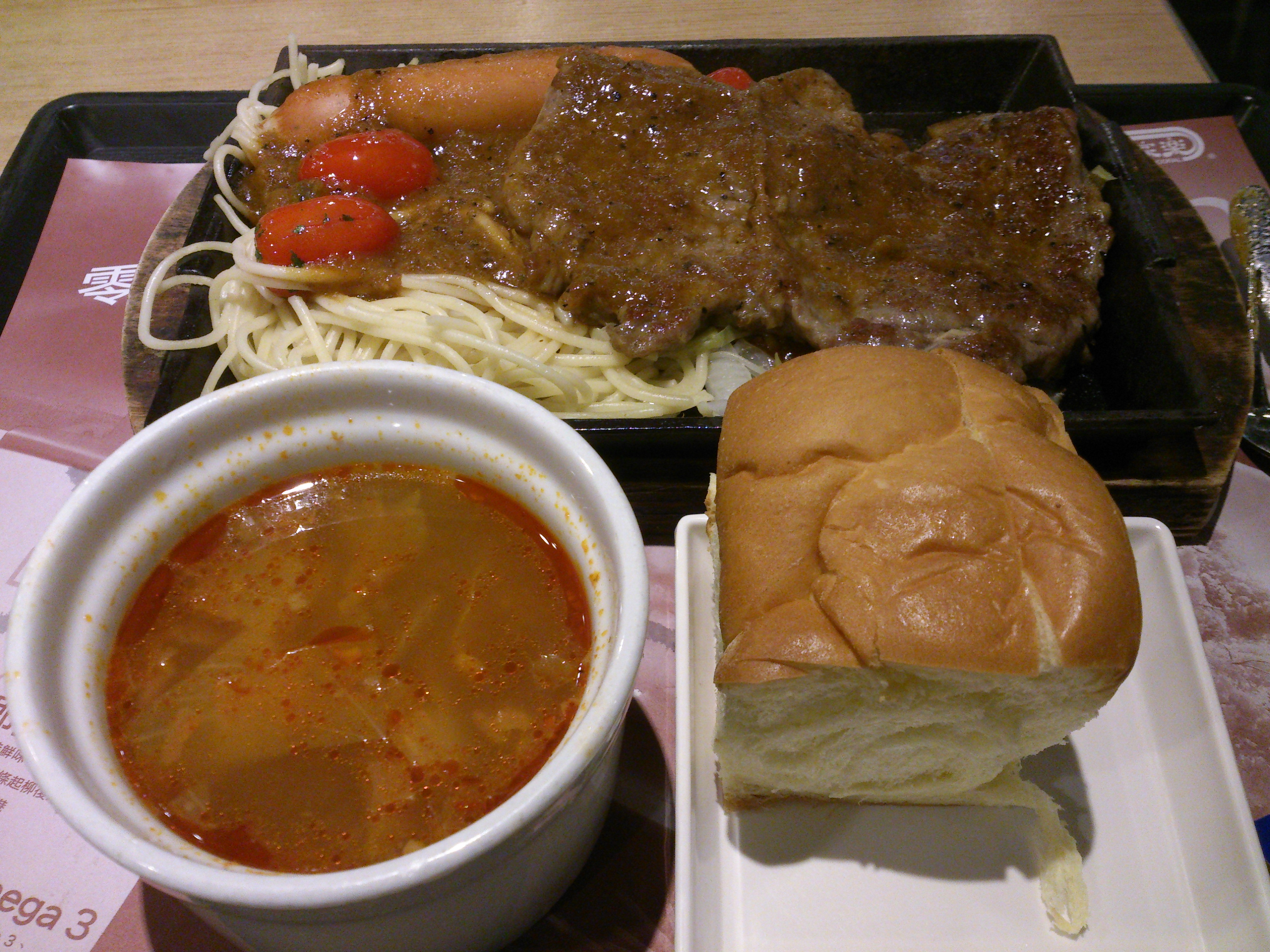
Canto-Western cuisine is common in Hong Kong. It has both "Western" and Chinese (mainly Cantonese) influences.

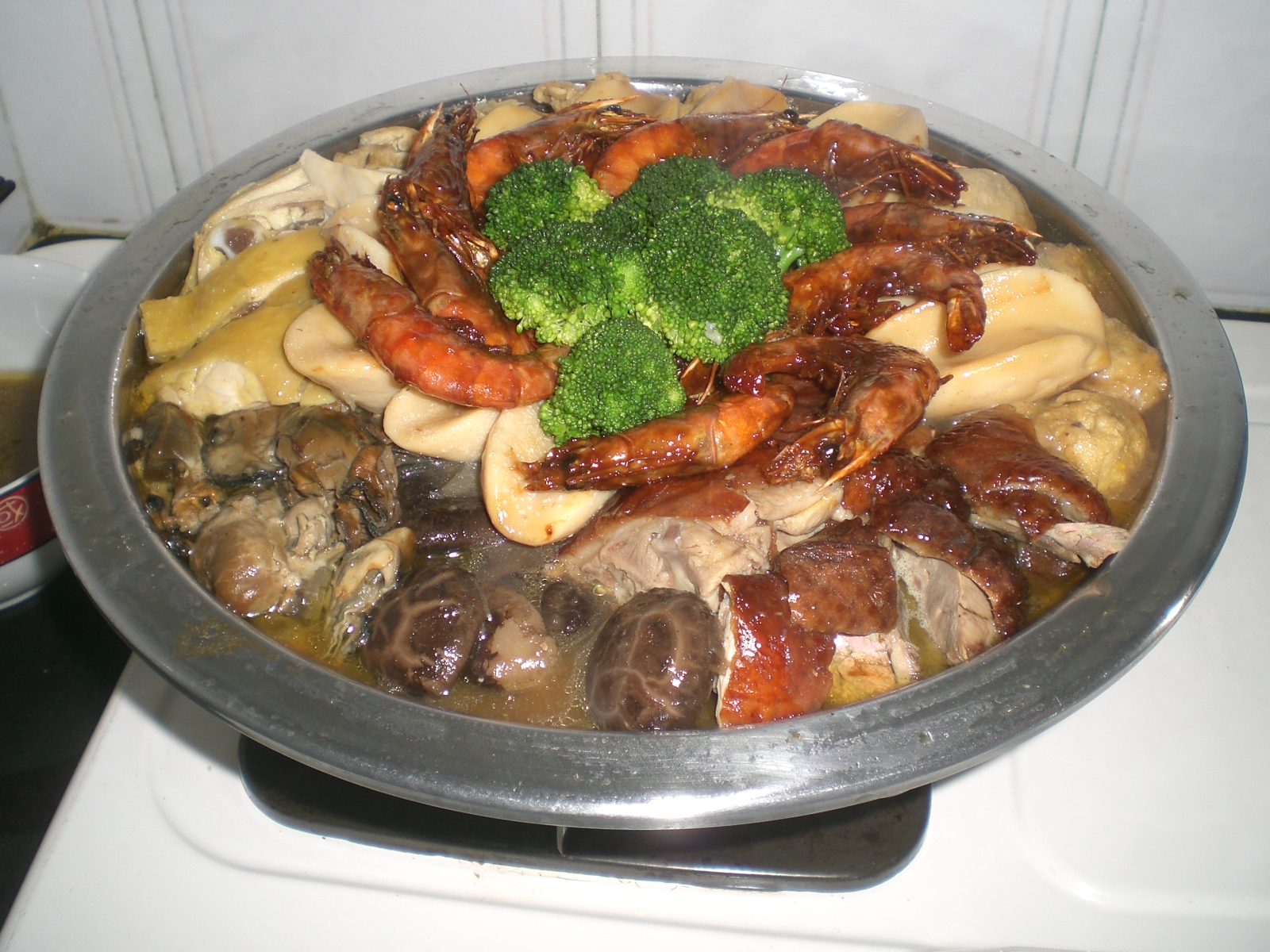
A bowl of poon choi. A traditional Hong Kong communal feast layering meats and seafood in a basin, symbolizing social equality, unity, and prosperity

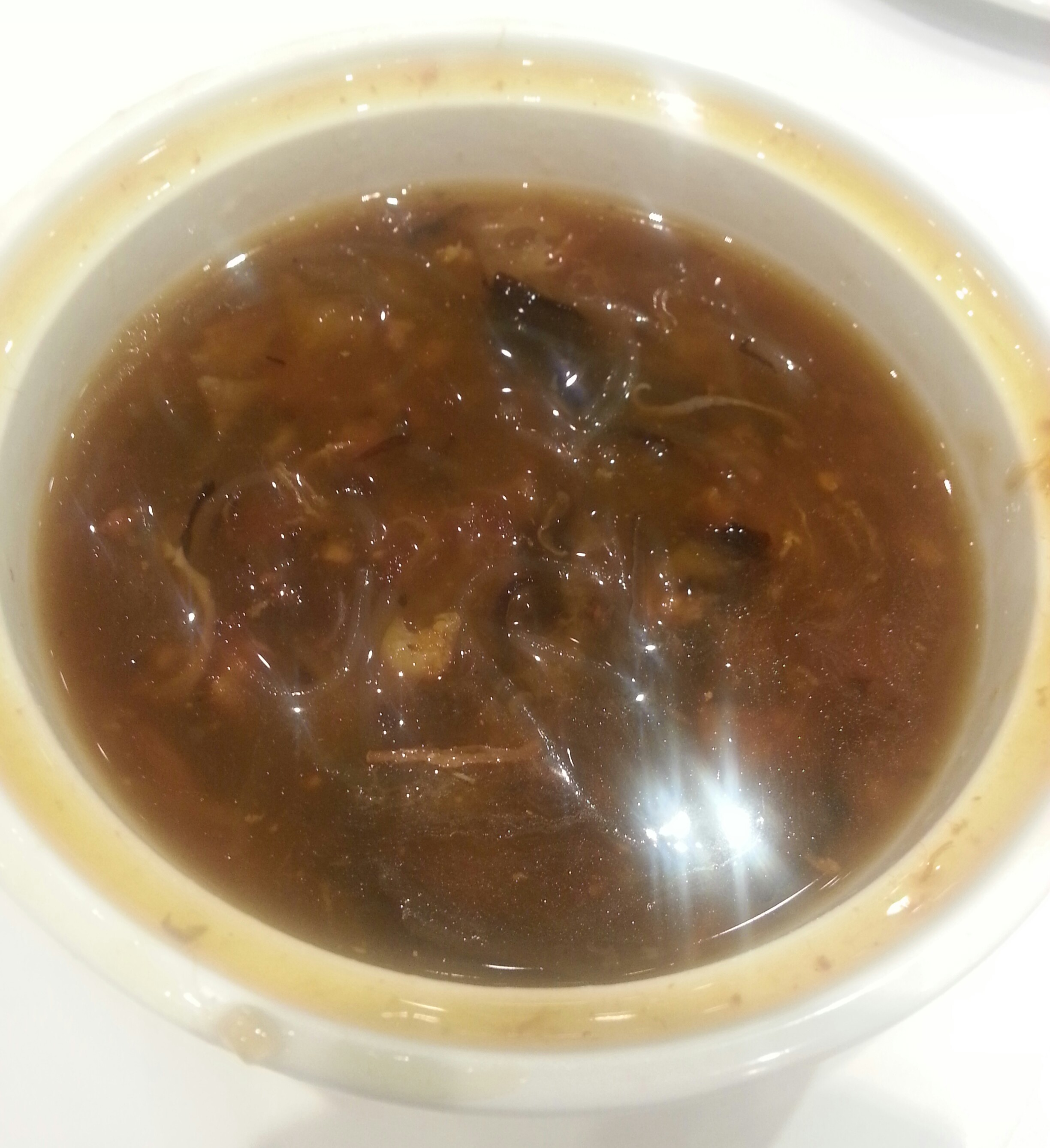
Imitation shark fin soup is a popular street snack invented in Hong Kong. It looks like shark fin soup but doesn't use actual shark fins. The soup is either made with synthetic shark fins, cellophane noodles, konjac gel, or other alternatives.

== Traditional celebrations ==
Hong Kong celebrates several distinctive holidays as part of eastern culture, which are not generally observed in western countries, apart from certain overseas communities (especially Cantonese). The best-known is Lunar New Year, which falls in late January or early February, about a month after the Gregorian New Year. During this time, Hong Kong resdents traditionally go to flower fairs, a practice also common among mainland Cantonese. Other Han Chinese events include the Dragon Boat Festival, when millions traditionally make zongzi at home, and the Mid-Autumn Festival, marked by the widespread purchase of Mooncakes from bakeries.

There are also several celebrations found only in Hong Kong, namely the Cheung Chau Bun Festival, the Birthday of Che Kung, and Hong Kong Well-wishing Festival.

Hong Kong local celebrations
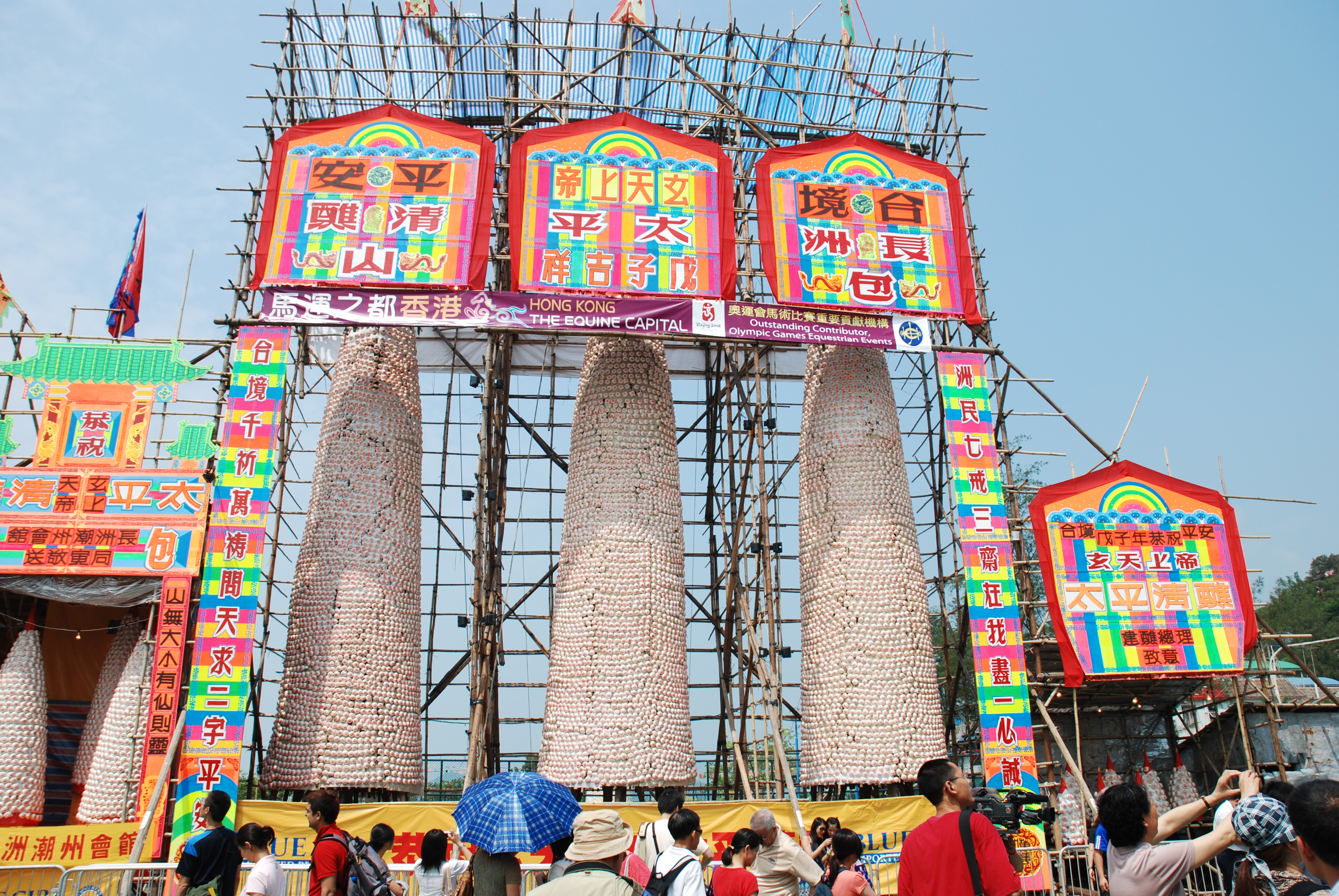
The Cheung Chau Bun Festival. A vibrant Hong Kong festival featuring tower climbing and parades to appease spirits, celebrate safety, and honor the deity Pak Tai.

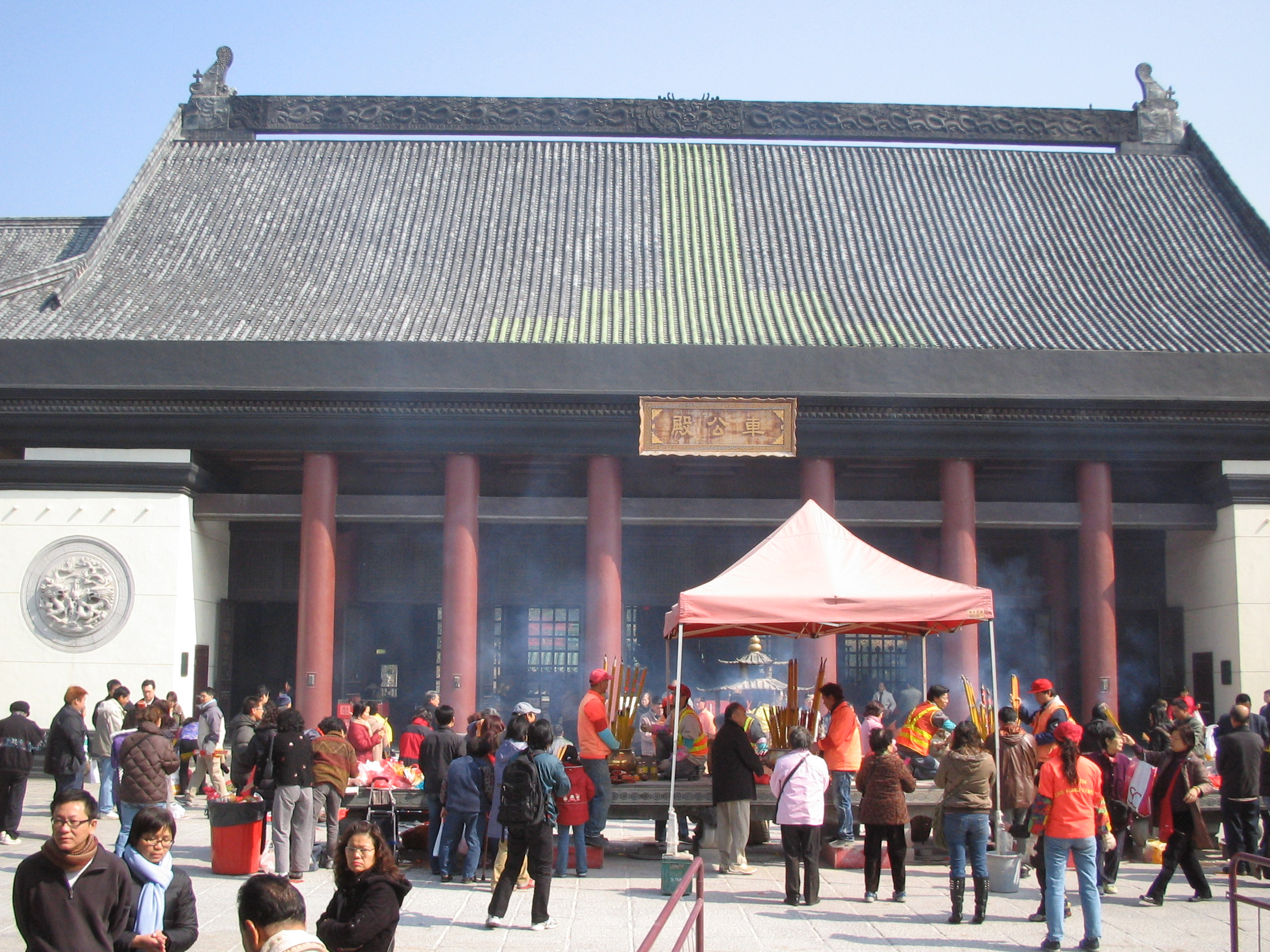
At the Birthday of Che Kung, Che Kung Temple in Sha Tin will become crowded.

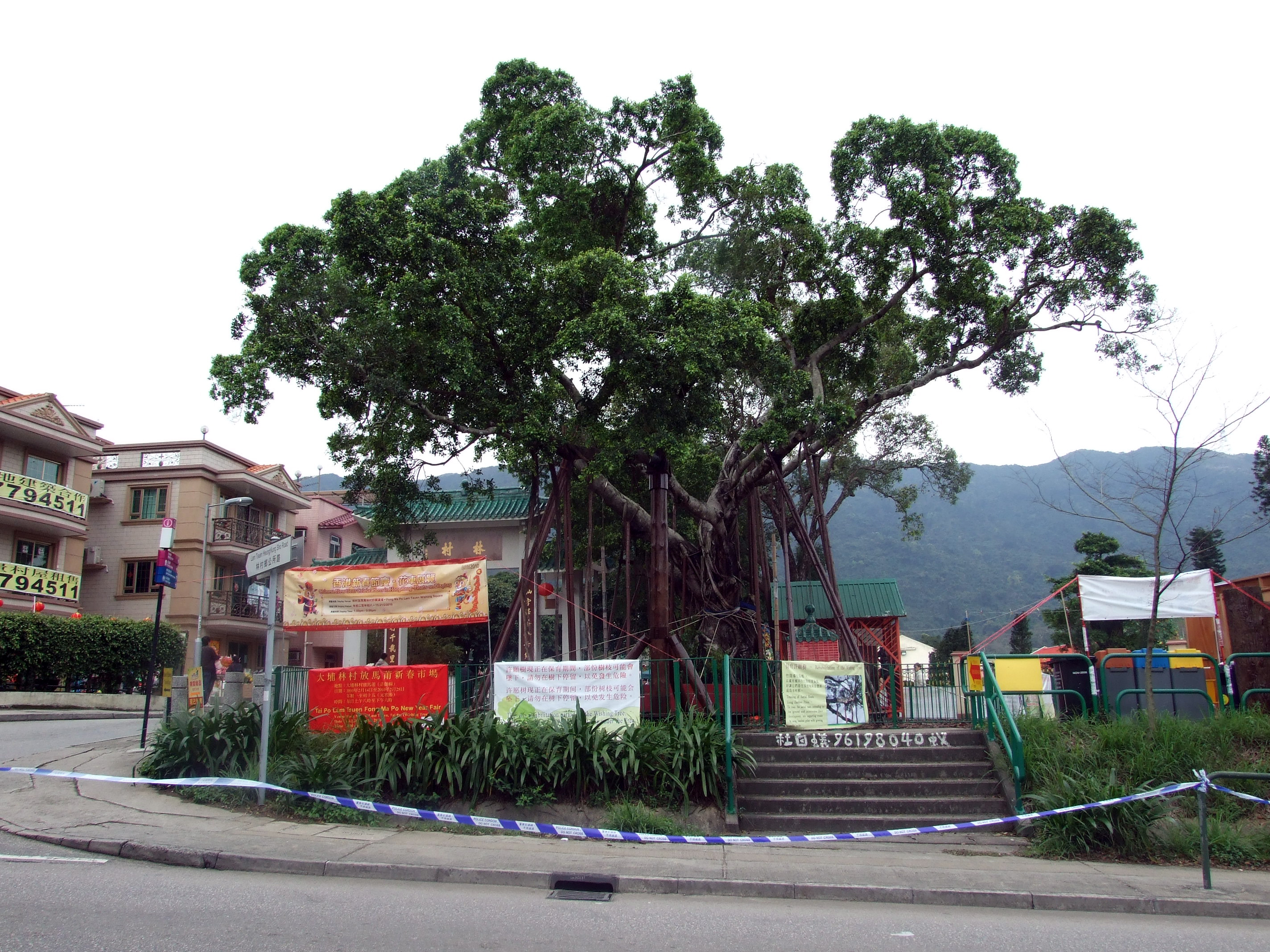
Hong Kong Well-wishing Festival involves locals throwing their wishes onto a wishing tree.

== Religions and beliefs ==
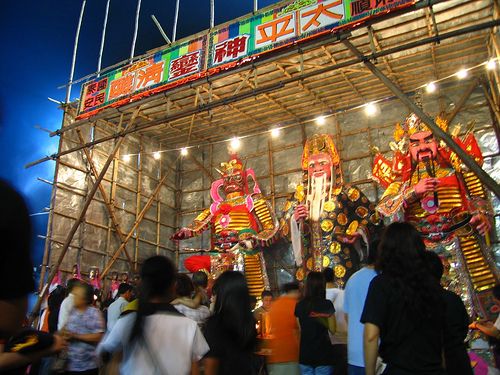
People honouring gods in a dajiao celebration, the Cheung Chau Bun Festival

Religion in Hong Kong is varied, although most Hong Kongers are of Cantonese / Guangdong descent and thus practice the Cantonese branch of Chinese folk religion, which also has elements of Confucian doctrines, Mahayana Buddhism and Taoist ritual traditions. In their Taoist traditions, Hong Kongers also show Cantonese characteristics. They, like the Cantonese people in the mainland, traditionally worship Wong Tai Sin and several other Taoist sea deities, such as Hung Shing and Mazu.

According to official statistics for the year 2010, about 50% of the utter population belongs to organised religions, specifically there are: 1.5 million Hong Kong Buddhists, 1 million Taoists, 480,000 Protestants, 353,000 Catholics, 220,000 Muslims, 40,000 Hindus, 10,000 Sikhs, and other smaller communities. A significant amount of the adherents of non-indigenous Chinese religions, in some cases the majority, are Hong Kong citizens of non-Han descent.

The other half of the population mostly takes part in other Chinese folk religions, which comprehend the worship of local gods and ancestors, in many cases not declaring this practice as a religious affiliation in surveys. The traditional Cantonese religiosity, including Mahayana Buddhism, was generally discouraged during the British rule over Hong Kong, which favoured Christianity. With the end of British rule and the handover of the sovereignty of the city-state to China, there has been a revival of Buddhism and Chinese folk religions.

=== Hong Kong death traditions ===
The art of ‘breaking out of hell’ (破地獄) is a traditional Taoist funeral rite in Hong Kong, performed to help the deceased escape suffering in the underworld. In 2024, the global release of the Hong Kong film The Last Dance brought this once‑specialised term into widespread public attention.

The art of "asking the dead" (Jyutping: Man^{6} mai^{5}; Traditional Chinese: 問米) has long been a tradition in Hong Kong. It is often common for living people to want to ask dead people about their lives in the underworld. In these rituals, people bring paper-made garments, paper-made money, and paper-made food to burn them, traditionally believing that this could pass the objects to dead people and give the latter a more comfortable afterlife.

This tradition originated from the Warring States period in China, at about 476 BCE. This is a common ancient practice in certain parts of Southern China and Hong Kong. However, the number of shops supporting this has been on the decline as people increasingly view this as superstition nowadays.

== Leisure ==
Hong Kongers devote much time to leisure. Mahjong is a popular social activity that most locals have played at some point in their lives. The game is a popular sight at family gatherings and is also played in mahjong parlours. The sight of elderly men playing Chinese chess in public parks, surrounded by watching crowds, is also common. Other board games, such as Chinese checkers are enjoyed by people of all ages.

Among teenagers, shopping, eating out, karaoke, and video games are popular. Japan is a major source of digital entertainment for cultural and proximity reasons. There are also popular local inventions such as the video game Little Fighter Online. In the mid 20th century, Hong Kong had some of the most up-to-date arcade games available outside Japan. Negative associations were drawn between triads and video game arcades. Today, soaring popularity of home video game consoles has somewhat diminished the arcade culture.

=== Shopping ===
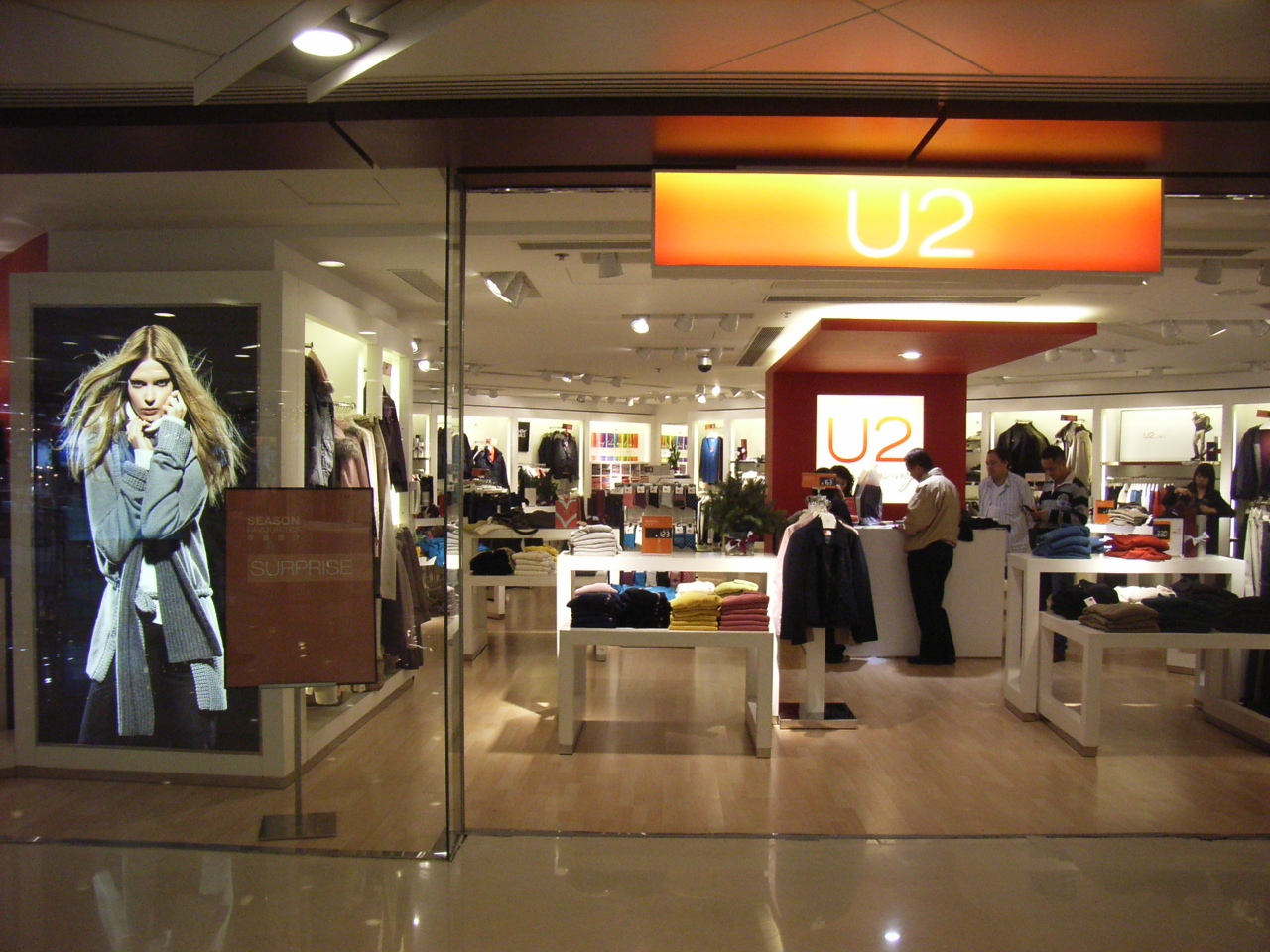
Westernised stores such as U2 are numerous.

Hong Kong, nicknamed "shopping paradise", is well known for its shopping district with multiple department stores. Many imported goods transported to Hong Kong have lower tax duties than the international standard, making most items affordable for the general public.

Hong Kong is identified by its materialistic culture and high levels of consumerism. Shops from the lowest end to the most upscale pack the streets in close proximity. Some popular shopping destinations include Mongkok, Tsim Sha Tsui, and Causeway Bay.

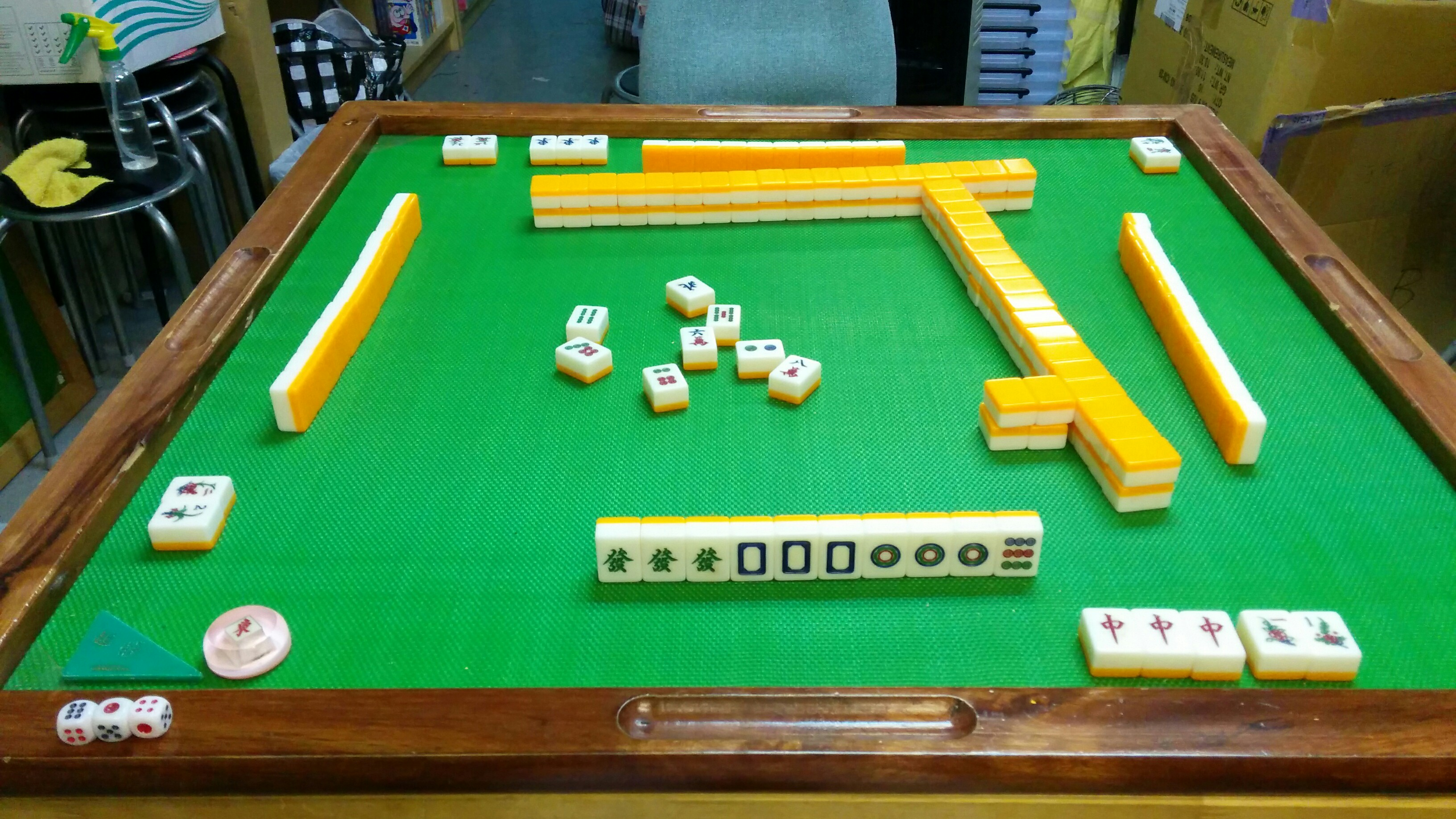
Mahjong table setup

=== Gambling ===
Gambling is popular in Cantonese culture and Hong Kong is no different. Movies such as the 1980s God of Gamblers have given a rather glamorous image to gambling in Hong Kong. However, gambling is legal only at three established and licensed institutions approved and supervised by the government of Hong Kong: horse racing (in Happy Valley and Sha Tin), the Mark Six lottery, and football (soccer) betting.

Games such as mahjong and many types of card games can be played for pleasure or with money at stake, with many mahjong parlours available. However, mahjong parlours are slowly diminishing as licences are no longer obtainable and, as a result, many old mahjong parlours have been forced to close.

==== Gambling organisations ====
The Hong Kong Jockey Club provides the only legal avenue for horse racing and gambling to locals, mostly middle-aged males. The club was established in 1844 by the British colonial government, with the first racecourse being built in Happy Valley. The club closed for a few years during World War II due to the Japanese occupation of Hong Kong. In 1975, lottery Mark Six was introduced. And in 2002, the Club offered wagerings for football world championship games including the English FA Premier League and the World Cup.

== Martial arts ==
Martial arts in Hong Kong is accepted as a form of entertainment or exercise. Tai chi is one of the most popular, especially among the elderly. Groups of people can be seen practicing tai chi in parks early in the morning. Many forms of martial arts are also passed down from different generations of Cantonese ancestry. The atmosphere is also distinct as people practice outdoor in peaks next to modern high rise buildings. Bruce Lee, a famous martial artist and actor, was born and raised in Hong Kong, later developing his own hybrid martial art, Jeet Kune Do, based on Taekwondo, Wing Chun and boxing.

== Sports ==
Despite limited land area, Hong Kong offers many recreational and competitive sports. Locally, sports in Hong Kong is described as "Club Life". Major multipurpose venues like Hong Kong Coliseum and civic facilities like Macpherson Stadium are available across the city. Internationally, Hong Kong has participated in various Olympic Games, and numerous other Asian Games events. The newly-built Kai Tak Sports Park is the largest stadium in Hong Kong, boasting a maximum capacity of 50,000 people.

== Video games ==
Arcade games first appeared in Hong Kong in the late 1970s. Most games during the golden age of arcade video games were designed by Japanese companies such as Namco and Taito but licensed by American game developers such as Midway Games and Atari. The first game to center the Hong Kong market was Pong but the most popular were Namco's Pac-Man, Taito's Space Invaders and Nintendo's Mario Bros. (released in 1978, 1980 and 1983 respectively). The games were so popular Pac-Man was featured in the 1983 animated film version of the manhua Old Master Q, San-T In 1987 Capcom's Street Fighter enjoyed unprecedented success and unlicensed film adaptations and comics flooded the market, including one by Xu Jingcheng incorporating elements of Chinese martial arts. Similarly SNK's The King of Fighters released in 1994 influenced youth fashion for years and at least 30 local "kung fu comics" were based on the game. While not produced in Hong Kong, United Front Games' Sleeping Dogs released in 2012 is set in Hong Kong, and contains elements of Chinese martial arts and parkour.

== Images from Hong Kong ==
The emblem of Hong Kong has a Hong Kong orchid design.

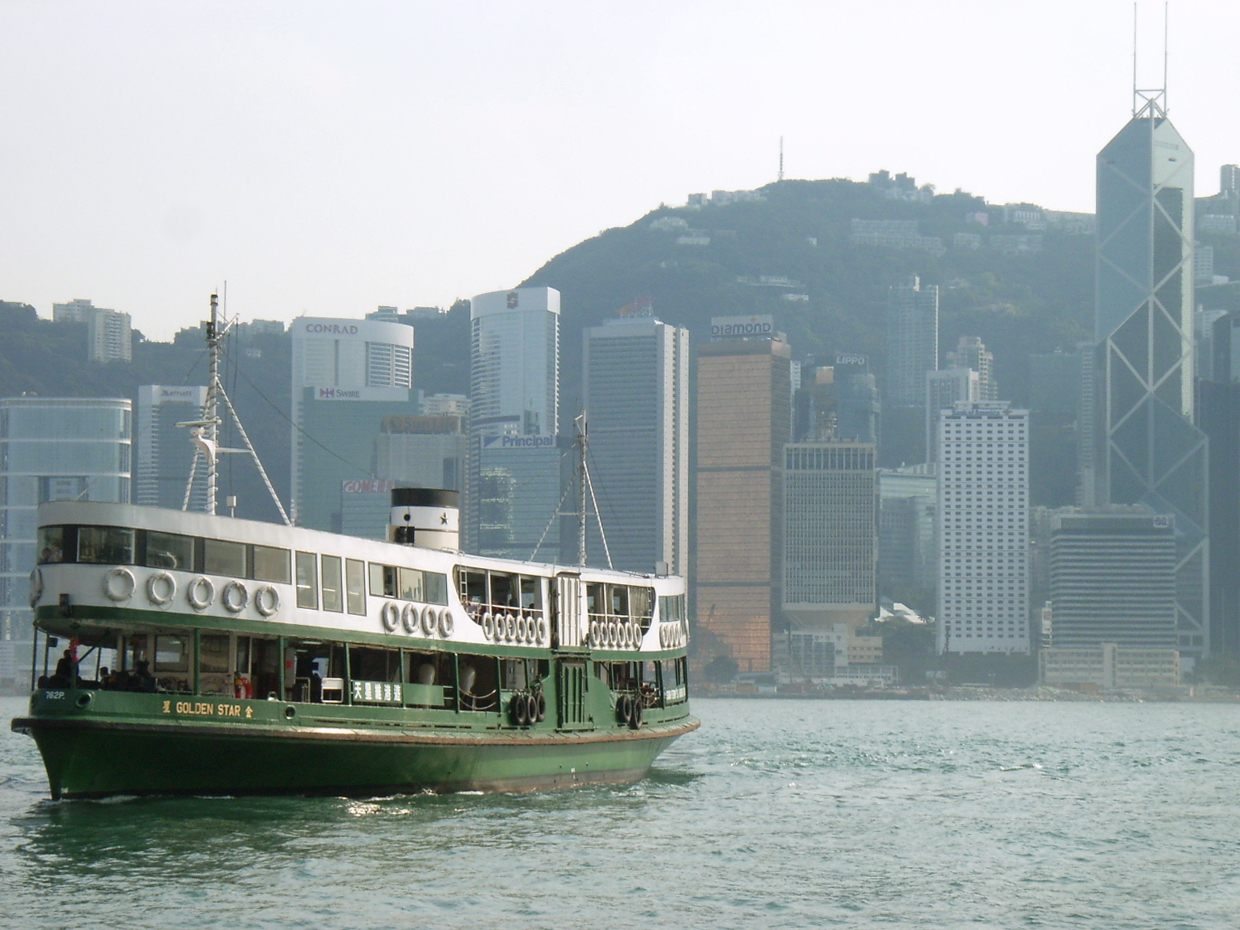
The Star Ferry is an icon of Hong Kong, being one of the oldest public transport systems in the city. It was the only way to cross the harbor before tunnels were built, and is still popular today, providing a scenic view of Victoria Harbor.

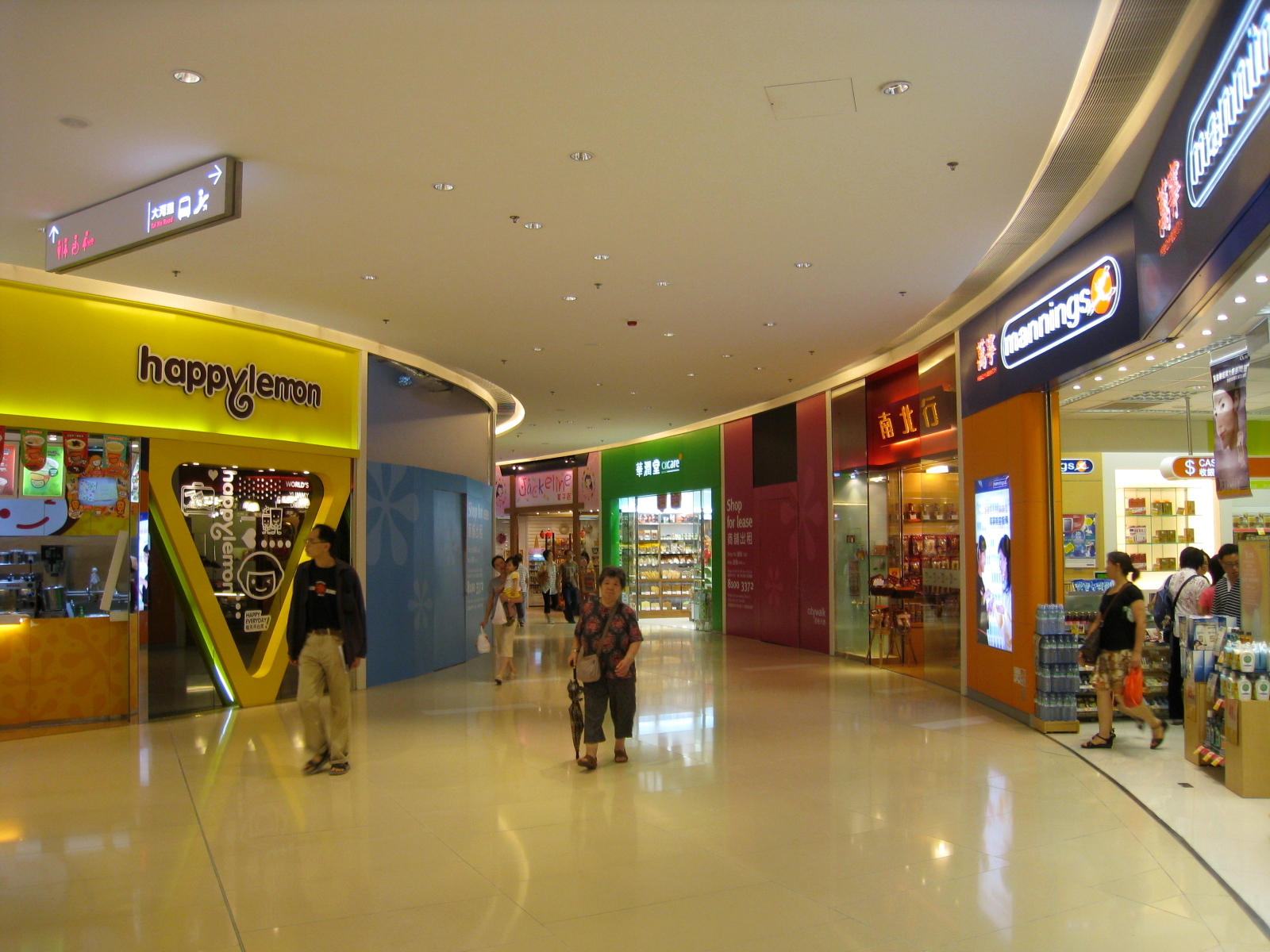
Hong Kong has also been dubbed the "shopping paradise" by many, with various malls across the city.

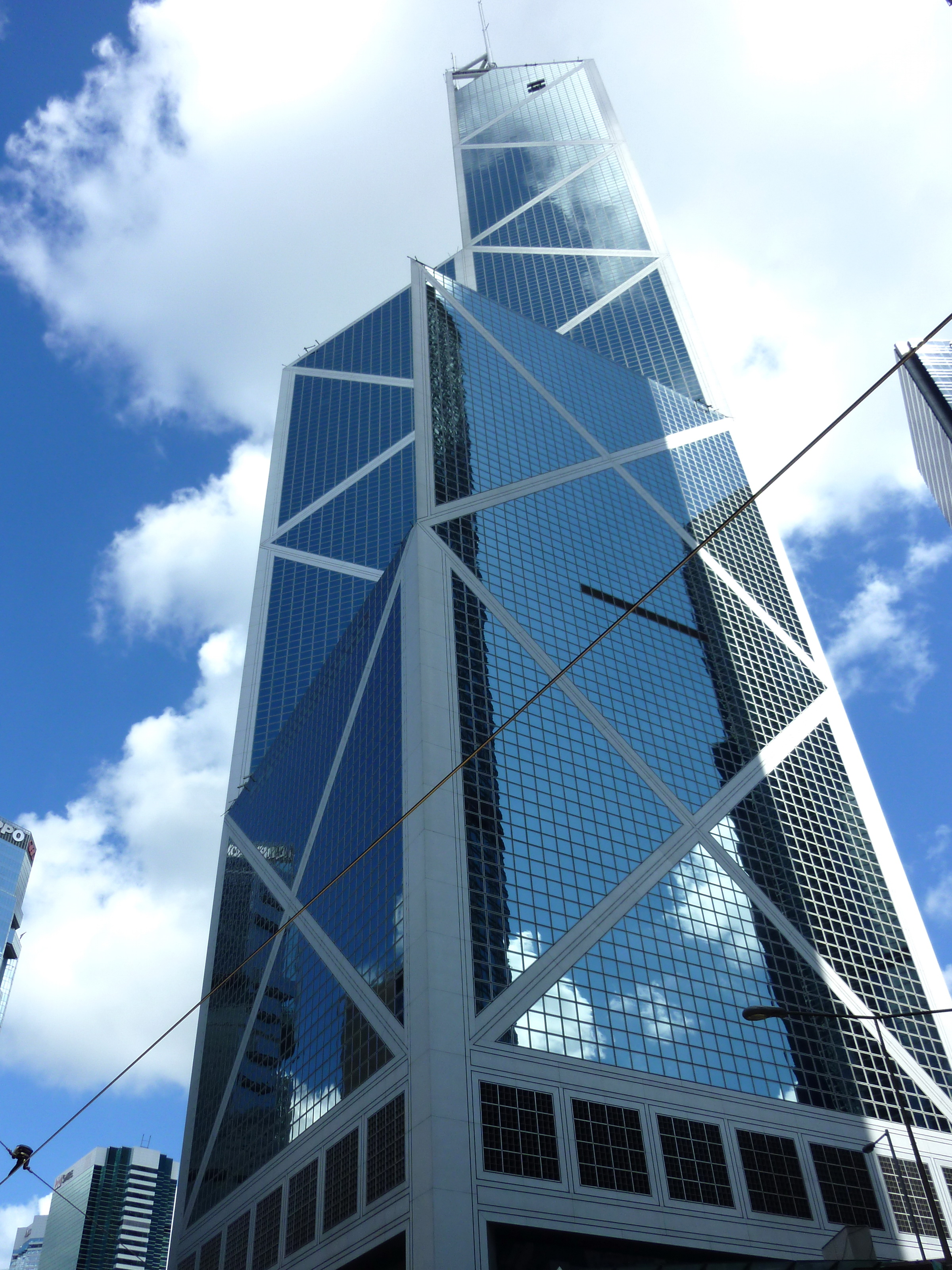
Bank of China Tower in Central

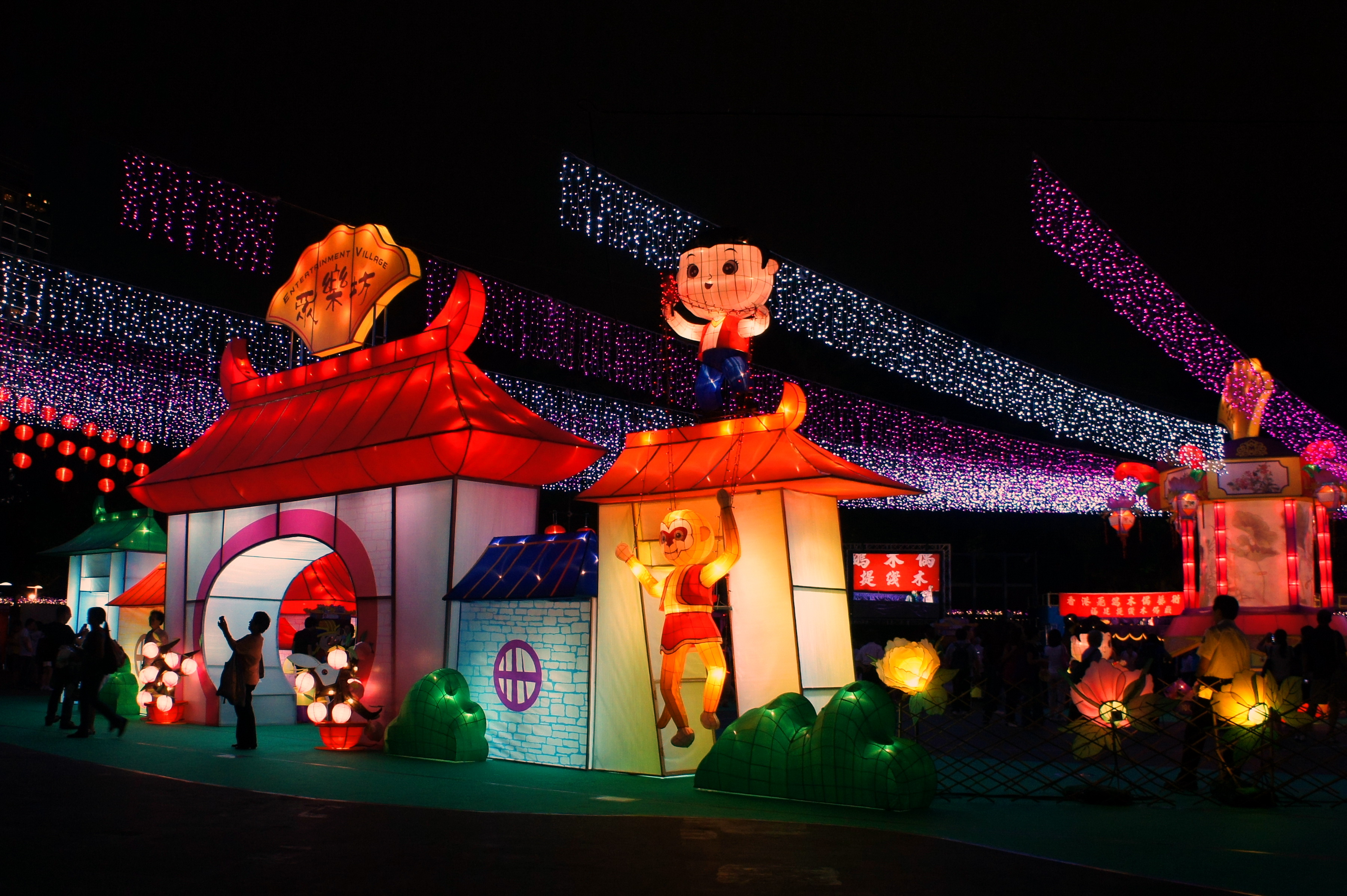
Mid-Autumn Festival carnival at Victoria Park in 2012

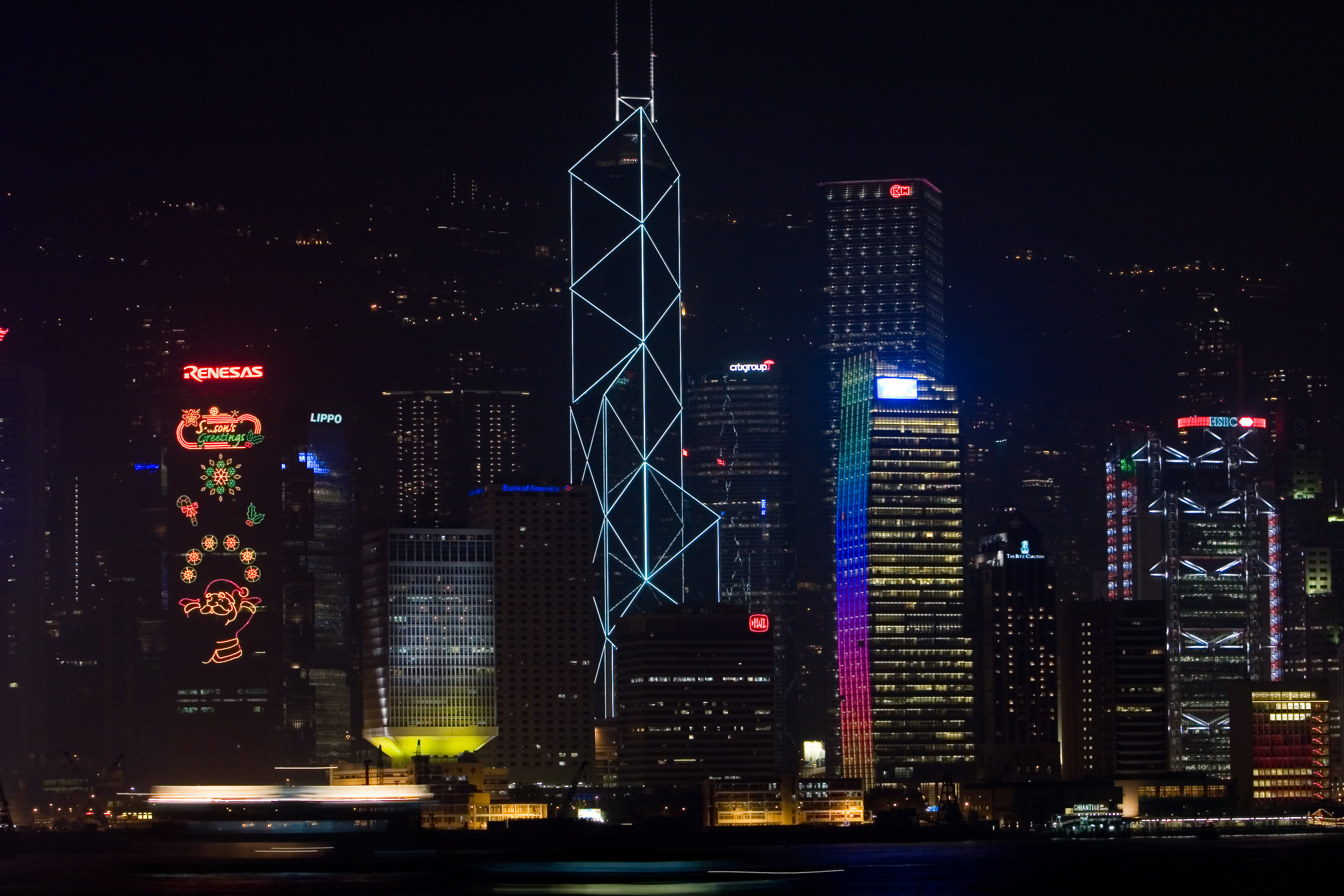
Victoria Harbour at night

== See also ==
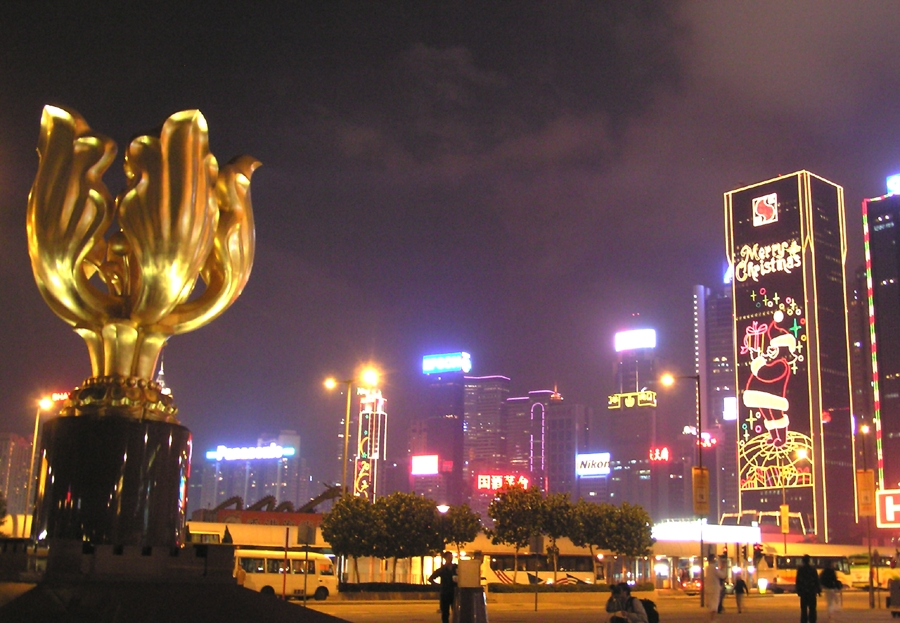
Golden Bauhinia Square on Christmas night; the square has a giant golden statue of the Hong Kong orchid.

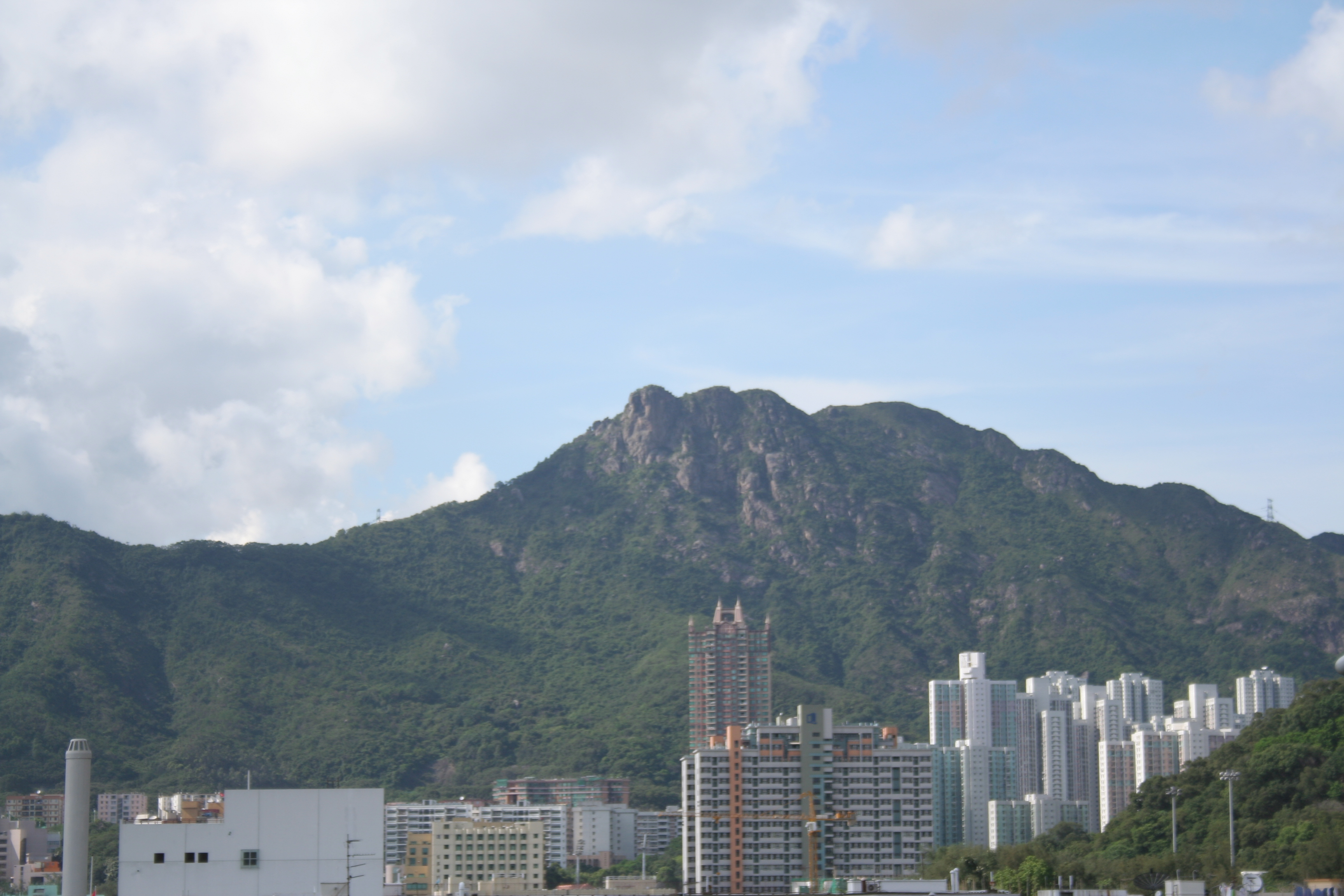
Lion Rock is a symbol of Hong Kong. There is a term, 獅子山下 (Beneath Lion Rock), which refers to the collective memory of 20th century Hong Kong.

- Hong Kong studies
- Street performance in Hong Kong

=== Symbols of Hong Kong ===
- Hong Kong orchid
- Lion Rock

=== Other Hong Kong cultures ===
- Lion Rock Spirit (aka "Hong Kong's core values"; 香港核心價值)
- Walled villages of Hong Kong
- Cantonese wedding
- Cantonese pre-wedding customs
- Villain hitting
- Bone collecting
- Hong Kong Kids phenomenon
- Ngai jong
- Pawnbrokers in Hong Kong

=== Hong Kong cultural policy ===
- Hong Kong cultural policy
- Leisure and Cultural Services Department
- Museums in Hong Kong

=== Related cultures ===
- Cantonese culture
- British culture
- Chinese culture:
  - Chinese mythology
  - Mahjong culture
