= Mapping Asia =

2014 art exhibition in Hong Kong

Mapping Asia was an art exhibition presented in the Asia Art Archive library in Hong Kong from May 12 to August 29, 2014. A physical unfolding of the Mapping Asia book, the exhibition manifested itself in space through artworks, objects, documentation, and videos and material from AAA's collection, considering one of the most frequently posed questions at Asia Art Archive: how is “Asia” defined?

== List of artists exhibited ==
Artists in the exhibition included Wong Hoy Cheong, MAP Office, Kwan Sheung-chi, Harry Harrison, Teboho Edkins, Zhou Tiehai, Erbossyn Meldibekov, Maria Thereza Alves, Naeem Mohaiemen, Ho Tzu Nyen, Sumangala Damodaran, Zarina Hashmi, Francisco Camacho, Karta Singh Healy, CAMP, Agha Shahid Ali, Bagyi Aung Soe, Tom Molloy, Adam Bobbette, and Robert Zhao. Unofficial "satellite sites" included Khalsa Diwan Sikh Temple, Hong Kong Maritime Museum, Chungking Mansions, Sai Wan War Cemetery and a 1967 Riots tour in North Point.

An exhibition catalogue was published in conjunction with the exhibition.

== Mapping Asia project ==
The Mapping Asia project took form in an expanded publication Mapping Asia, an exhibition, and a series of programmes between April and September 2014. Traversing land and sea, connecting Guangzhou to Peru, Lesotho and Elba with a field note-like approach that includes artwork, essays, email exchange, literary extracts, film, exhibition reviews, music, newspaper clippings and comics, the project offered impressions of Asia to stimulate further research.

The publication includes a foreword by co-editors Claire Hsu and Chantal Wong, and contributions from MAP Office, Rasheed Araeen and Chen Kuan-hsing, Brinda Kumar, Yin Ker, Teboho Edkins, Phoebe Wong, Ho Tzu Nyen and Robert Wessing, Francisco Camacho, Adam Bobbette, Terence Pang, Sardjana Sumichan, Toru Hanai, Zhou Tiehai, AMitav Ghosh, Andrew Ross and MTL (Nitasha Dhillon and Amin Husain), Harry Harrison, Jeannie Wu and Agha Shahid Ali.

Public programs included Singing Resistance with Sumangala Damodaran, a concert featuring songs from India's anti-colonial and immediate post-colonial resistance movement, presented in collaboration with Spring Workshop.
