= Asia Art Archive =

Non-profit art organisation in Hong Kong

Coordinates: 22°17′08″N 114°08′54″E

- Traditional Chinese: 亞洲藝術文獻庫
- Simplified Chinese: 亚洲艺术文献库
Transcriptions
Standard Mandarin
- Hanyu Pinyin: Yàzhōu Yìshù Wénxiàn Kù
Yue: Cantonese
- Yale Romanization: Aa jāu ngaih seuht màhn hin fu
- Jyutping: Aa3 zau1 ngai6 seot6 man4 hin3 fu3

Asia Art Archive
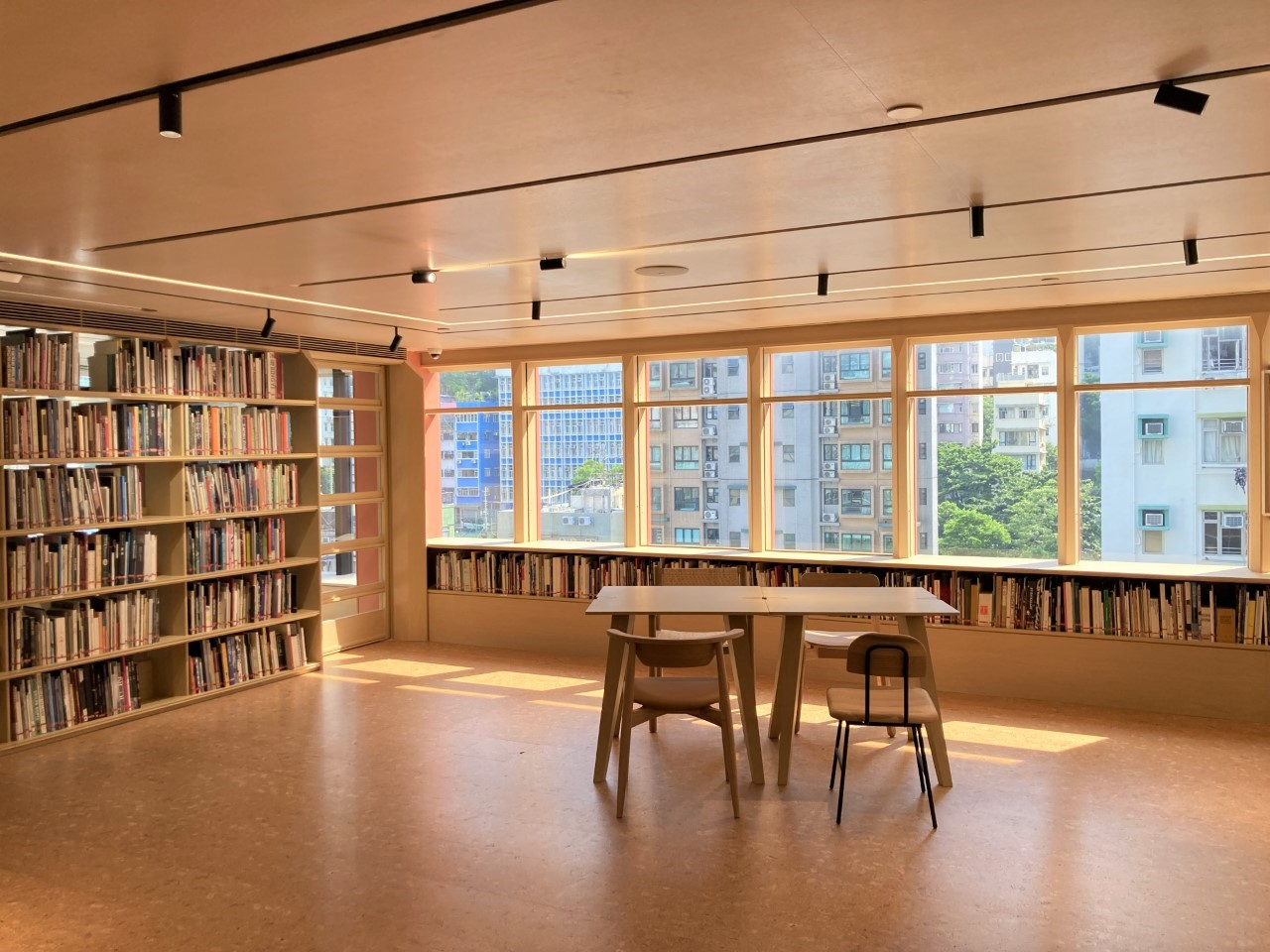
- Asia Art Archive's Library in Hong Kong
- Location: Hong Kong, China
- Type: Archive
- Established: 2000

Other information
- Website: aaa.org.hk/en

Asia Art Archive (AAA) is a nonprofit organisation based in Hong Kong that documents the recent history of contemporary art in Asia within an international context. AAA incorporates material that members of local art communities find relevant to the field, and provides educational and public programming. AAA is one of the most comprehensive publicly accessible collections of research materials in the field. In activating its collections, AAA initiates public, educational, and residency programmes. AAA also offers research grants and publishes art and cultural criticism on its online publishing platform Like a Fever, whose tagline is "obsessive, moody, and oriented towards cure."

AAA is a registered charity in Hong Kong governed by a board of directors and guided by a rotating Advisory Board. The collection is accessible free of charge at AAA in Hong Kong's Sheung Wan District at 233 Hollywood Road, and searchable via an online catalog. Asia Art Archive's library was renovated in 2022, increasing its shelving capacity by fifty percent.

International locations are based in New York (Asia Art Archive in America) and New Delhi (Asia Art Archive in India).

== History ==
Asia Art Archive was founded in 2000 by Claire Hsu, Johnson Chang Tsong-zung, and Ronald Arculli with a mandate to document and secure the multiple recent histories of contemporary art in the region. Hsu became its first Executive Director. In September 2021, Christopher K. Ho was appointed as the Executive Director of Asia Art Archive, after Hsu stepped down and moved to co-chair the board of the organisation.

In over 20 years, AAA has collected over 120,000 records related to contemporary art. The Archive has organised more than 500 programmes and projects beyond its library and archival activities. These range from research-driven projects and discursive gatherings to residencies and youth and community projects.

Speakers at public talks and symposia have included Ai Weiwei, Xu Bing, Luke Ching Chin Wai, David Elliott, Guerilla Girls, Huang Yongping, Yuko Hasegawa, Htein Lin, Mariko Mori, Jun Nguyen-Hatsushiba, ruangrupa, Nilima Sheikh, Mali Wu, Zhang Peili.

In 2007, AAA launched a residency programme to encourage new readings of the physical material in the Archive, to offer individuals the chance to work with material outside their usual concentrations, and to support projects around the idea of the 'archive'. International residents have included Raqs Media Collective and Young-hae Chang Heavy Industries; local residents have included art critic and curator Jasper Lau Kin Wah, and artists Cedric Maridet, Pak Sheung Chuen, and Wong Wai Yin.

AAA has also initiated focused research projects that build areas of specialisation in the collection. These include the four-year project 'Materials of the Future: Documenting Contemporary Chinese Art 1980–1990' which focused on the history of contemporary Chinese art in the 1980s, the digitisation of the personal archives of Geeta Kapur and Vivan Sundaram from Delhi, and the digitisation of the archives of Ray Langenbach from Malaysia, Salon Natasha in Hanoi, Ellen Pau in Hong Kong, Mrinalini Mukherjee from India, and Blue Space in Ho Chi Minh City.

The chair of the board since 2003 was Jane DeBevoise. In 2021, Christopher K. Ho was named the Executive Director of Asia Art Archive, with Claire Hsu moving to co-chair of the board with Benjamin Cha. DeBevoise remains a board member of AAA in Hong Kong, as well as Board Chair of Asia Art Archive in America.

== Archive acquisition ==
The Archive's collection policy is designed to reflect the priorities of local and regional artists, art organisations, galleries, critics, and academics. In January 2023, there were more than 120,000 records available through the online library catalogue. About 70% of AAA's acquisitions are donations; some are unsolicited but many are gathered by AAA's researchers.

== Research collections ==
The research collections held by AAA include primary source documents such as artists' writings, sketches, and original visual documentation. As well as personal material donated by individuals, there are rare periodicals and publications. The archive keeps files of individuals, events, and organisations, and produces some of its own material, including images and audio-visual material.

Other collections collate original sketches and texts by artists, including Roberto Chabet (Philippines), Ha Bik Chuen (China), Lee Wen (Singapore), Lu Peng (China), Mao Xuhui (China), Wu Shanzhuan (China), Nilima Sheikh (India), and Zhang Xiaogang (China). The archive collaborated with ARTstor to digitise the collection, making the scans available online through the two organisations' websites.

== Selected projects ==
=== 2021 onwards ===
- Art Schools of Asia (2021–2022): a closed-door online seminar series to develop a methodology and theory for thinking about the history of art schools, from the perspective of the complex artistic, social, and political histories across Asia.
- Portals, Stories, and Other Journeys (2021): stems from Asia Art Archive's research since 2014 into the personal archive of the late Hong Kong–based artist Ha Bik Chuen (1925–2009). This exhibition comprises ten "sets" that share what this archive can do—how it fuels practices of artists, and how it shapes and shifts our understanding of Hong Kong's history and art.
- Translations, Expansions (2022): AAA participated in documenta fifteen, initiated by Jakarta-based collective ruangrupa. As part of a group of collectives and organisations working on education and archiving in a broad sense, AAA's contribution to documenta fifteen is a display that emphasises the active role artists themselves have played in preserving and mediating cultural knowledge.
- The Collective School (2022–2023): Developed in collaboration with Gudskul, The Collective School explores artist-driven and collective models of learning. Eight collectives from across Asia responded to archival materials from AAA Collections, developed together through group conversations over the past year.

=== 2011–2020 ===
- 36 Calendars (2011-2012): A participatory exhibition of Song Dong that re-writes the last 36 years of history from his personal perspective in the form of hand-drawn annual household wall calendars, co-presented by Asia Art Archive (AAA) and Mobile M+, West Kowloon Cultural District Authority.
- Mobile Library (since 2011): Mobile Library is a recurring effort organised in collaboration with cultural collaborators in several countries around Asia, activating new opportunities to interact with art as a source of information.
- Bibliography of Modern and Contemporary Art Writing of South Asia (since 2011): Bibliography of Modern and Contemporary Art Writing in South Asia compiles annotated bibliographies of South Asian art writing in a variety of languages and provides users with interactive tools on its website to enrich their knowledge of the field.
- Sites of Construction (2013): AAA organised a symposium to discuss the important role of exhibitions in carrying art history narratives in Asia, accompanied by a screening of eight documentary films.
- Mapping Asia Exhibition (2014): Mapping Asia unfolds physically into Asia Art Archive's site through an exhibition in the library. The exhibition manifests itself in space through artworks, objects, documentation, and videos and material from AAA's collection.
- Hong Kong Conversations (since 2014): Hong Kong Conversations is a series of talks focusing on Hong Kong's art ecology within a cultural and socio-political framework.
- 15 Invitations (2015–2017): 15 creative practitioners were invited to a unique program series celebrating Asia Art Archive's 15th anniversary and discussing where AAA originated, where it might be heading, which concluded in an e-dossier, with the participants documenting their workflow.
- The Critical Dictionary of Southeast Asia, Vol 1: G for Ghost(writers) (2017): Ho Tzu Nyen's multimedia project was exhibited in Asia Art Archive's library from 21 Mar–19 Aug 2017. His video installations include clips from several films, aiming to explore how narratives construct identities and ideas.
- It Begins with a Story: Artists, Writers, and Periodicals in Asia (2018): A symposium organised by Asia Art Archive in association with The Department of Fine Arts at The University of Hong Kong, explored how periodicals encouraged discussions about art and new visual trends in twentieth-century Asia.
- Lines of Flight: Nilima Sheikh Archive (2018): The exhibition Lines of Flight brought together documents from Nilima Sheikh's archive to show how she conducted research through her travels and how her artistic methods could modify material cultures and histories across international boundaries.
- Women Make Art History (2018): The Guerrilla Girls' exhibition at the AAA booth at Art Basel deploys their signature blend of humour, bold graphics, and statistics culled from online and published sources to provoke discussion about women in art.
- Form Colour Action (2019): Form Colour Action explores sketchbooks and notebooks as sites of performance. Drawings, paintings, notes, and performance recordings by the avant-garde artist Lee Wen from 1978 to 2014 were on show for the first time in this exhibition, presenting his concept of "drawing is the most basic time-based medium," and his development of performance art as tracings of daily routines of the human, the environment, and the cosmos.
- Life Lessons (2020–2022): As part of AAA's twentieth anniversary, Life Lessons, a series of online and offline conversations and workshops with artists, art collectives, and creative educational practitioners was scheduled from spring 2020 to spring 2022 to discuss the role of artistic pedagogy and art schools in the development of modern and contemporary art in Asia and beyond.
- Learning What Can't Be Taught (2020–2021): The exhibition focused on the continuity and differences between six artists from three generations who were each other's teachers and students at China Academy of Art, proposing that educational backgrounds can reveal lineages of artistic attitudes, while also complicating conventional narratives about Chinese art history.

=== 2000-2010 ===
- Space Traffic – Symposium of International Artist's Spaces (2001): This symposium, co-organised by AAA, Para/Site, and West Space, investigated issues, problems, and possibilities faced by alternative art spaces and made possible direct dialogue between art spaces of this kind across Asia.
- Contemporary Asian Art Forum: Links, Platforms, Network (2003): Jointly presented by AAA and the Cultural Co-operation Forum organised by the Hong Kong Government Home Affairs Bureau, this symposium brought together artists, curators, and art professionals from Asia to discuss the building and sustaining of links, platforms, and networks in the contemporary Asian art arena.
- Archiving the Contemporary: Documenting Asian Art Today, Yesterday and Tomorrow (2005): 'Archiving the Contemporary' was a workshop that brought together over 40 art professionals from around the world to look at the problematics of archiving, collection policies, classification systems, technological advancement, preservation, knowledge management, and information sharing in relation to contemporary art from Asia.
- Archiving Artist-run Spaces (2007): This series of talks examined six artist-run spaces in Manila that were centres for Filipino contemporary art, including Pinaglabanan Gallery, The Junk Shop, Third Space, Surrounded By Water, Big Sky Mind, and Future Prospects.
- Build Your Dream Museum Collection Everyday! (2008/2009): In 2008, 10,000 'Dream Museum' cards were distributed to the community, offering a platform for the public to consider and describe its ideal museum. AAA set up a booth at ART HK 08, providing a platform for interactive engagement with the ongoing education project, and artist workshops were conducted throughout the four-day event. In 2009, as Hong Kong embarked on the West Kowloon Cultural District project, AAA called on the community to build a collection for the 'Dream Museum' by sending in an object or uploading an image on www.dreammuseum.org. Taking Thai respondent Sarawut Chutiwongpeti's suggestion for the 'Dream Museum' to be 'Like 7-Eleven', AAA established the 'Dream Museum Convenience Store' at ART HK 09. Participants were asked to bring images or objects to AAA's booth to contribute to the 'collection'. On-site workshops with artists, curators, designers, and architects facilitated the discussion.
- Backroom Conversations (2008–2012): As the official educational partner of ART HK (Hong Kong International Art Fair), AAA presents an annual series of panel discussions and screenings with leading experts and practitioners in the field that touch on prevalent issues and offer a first-hand look into the contemporary art world today. Topics have included 'Reinvesting in Contemporary Chinese Art'; 'Heritage Sites: the Answer to Hong Kong's Arts Needs?'; 'Artist as Activist, Art as Catalyst'; and 'In the Aftermath of the White Cube: Museums and Other Spaces'. Speakers have included Ron Arad, Sabine Breitwieser, Johnson Chang, David Elliott, Yuko Hasegawa, Manray Hsu, Hu Fang, Eungie Joo, Vasif Kortun, Barbara London, Charles Merewether, Frances Morris, Alexandra Munroe, Martha Rosler, Rirkrit Tiravanija, Sheena Wagstaff, Ada Wong, Wong Hoy Cheong, Pauline Yao, and Daniela Zyman, among others. Originally named Hong Kong Conversations, the series was renamed in 2009.
- Shifting Sites: Cultural Desire and the Museum (2008): AAA and The Department of Cultural and Religious Studies at The Chinese University of Hong Kong invited key individuals and institutions to address relevant issues and share their insights and experiences on the roles of museums. The 'Shifting Sites' conference included keynote speeches, presentations, reports, and group discussions that raised awareness about current debates surrounding contemporary museum practices in Asia.
- Action Script –Symposium on Performance Art Practice and Documentation in Asia (2010): This five-day symposium, co-presented with the Centre for Community Cultural Development, brought internationally respected performance artists, archivists, and researchers together in Hong Kong to consider the practice of performance art in Asia and to critically discuss the challenges associated with archiving performance work or 'live art'.
- From Jean-Paul Sartre to Teresa Teng: Contemporary Cantonese Art in the 1980s (2010): Drawn from primary research, rare film footage, and 14 interviews with artists, curators, and historians active in the Guangdong region during the 1980s collected as part of the research for the film From Jean-Paul Sartre to Teresa Teng: Contemporary Cantonese Art in the 1980s.
- Materials of the Future: Documenting Contemporary Chinese Art from 1980–1990 (2010): In 2006, AAA began locating, collecting, and preserving a large body of important material from the 1980s, a period in China's art history that was in danger of being lost. At the same time, AAA conducted a series of in-depth professional interviews with artists, critics, and curators of the 1980s in an attempt to record this period of contemporary Chinese art. With more than 70,000 digital documents, AAA now maintains the world's largest and most systematically organised archive of documentary material about Chinese art of the 1980s. The project culminated in September 2010 with the launch of the website www.china1980s.org
