= Spring Workshop =

Spring Workshop (Chinese: Spring 工作室) was a nonprofit arts organization based in Hong Kong from 2011 to 2018. It was founded as a cross-disciplinary residency program and exhibition space. In 2016, Spring received the Prudential Eye Award for Best Asian Contemporary Art Organization.

== History ==
Spring Workshop was privately funded as a five-year experimental initiative with artistic craftsmanship and experience. The organization worked with more than 350 local and international residents and collaborators, including Ming Wong, Wu Tsang, Heman Chong, Wong Wai Yin, Qiu Zhijie, Christodoulos Panayiotou, Ho Tzu Nyen, Melati Suryodarmo, Jalal Toufic and Michael Friedman. Spring organized over 100 public programs and exhibitions, and produced several publications.

Located in the industrial neighborhood of Wong Chuk Hang, the organization was housed in 14,500 sq ft of warehouse space, including studios, an exhibition space, a kitchen, a lounge, and a terrace. The organization addresses the shortage of space faced by creatives in Hong Kong in Fo Tan, Kwun Tong, and Chai Wan.

In 2016, the founder, Mimi Brown, stated that Spring, at the end of its five-year run, would enter a period "where it can lay fallow for a while like a field."

== Exhibitions and programs ==
The Spring team produced various research-driven exhibitions organized in collaboration with their residents. These exhibitions included A Collective Present with Tiffany Chung and Koki Tanaka (2017); Sailing Through Ha Bik Chuen’s Archive with John Batten (2017); Without Trying with Wong Wai Yin (2016); Duilian with Wu Tsang (2016); Days push off into nights (2015); The Permeability of Certain Matters with Christodoulos Panayiotou and Philip Wiegard (2014); Adventures in Reality with Michael Friedman (2012); and The Universe of Naming with Qiu Zhijie (2013). Spring also commissioned works for ongoing display from Hong Kong artists Kacey Wong, and ESKYIU, while also featuring works by Magdalen Wong and Iftikhar Dadi, among others.

Spring collaborated with non-profit arts organizations in Hong Kong and abroad, such as Asia Art Archive, Para Site, Tai Kwun, Videotage, soundpocket, and Witte de With Centre for Contemporary Art, on exhibitions and programs. Spring's first presentation in 2011 of Yang Fudong's The Fifth Night was in collaboration with Videotage. Sumangala Damodaran's Singing Resistance (2014) was conceived with Claire Hsu in partnership with Asia Art Archive. Spring presented the performance program for the exhibition Taiping Tianguo, curated by Doryun Chong and Cosmin Costinas, as well as Islands Off the Shores of Asia (2014), curated by Inti Guerrero and Cosmin Costinas of Para Site, which highlighted work by Ming Wong developed over his two residencies. The organization hosted the HKNME's Modern Academy music education program for young professionals, and a dance program created by Happ’art featuring the work of choreographer Bruno Isakovic. It hosted M+/Design Trust grantees Ling Fan and Joseph Grima as residents. Ari Benjamin Meyers's An exposition, not an exhibition (2017) was presented as a prelude to the launch of the Kunsthalle for Music with Witte de With Center for Contemporary Art. Moderation(s) (2012–14) was co-created with artist Heman Chong and curator Defne Ayas, former director of Witte de With Center for Contemporary Art, and featured several programs, including Guilty Pleasures by Ang Song Ming; Incidents of Travel, a program conceived by Latitudes featuring Nadim Abbas, Yuk King Tan, Ho Sin Tung, and Samson Young, A Fictional Residency with Oscar van den Boogaard, and The Social Contract by A Constructed World (2013).

In 2018, Spring presented Dismantling the Scaffold—the inaugural contemporary art exhibition at Tai Kwun, the center for heritage and arts located at the former Central Police Station complex in Hong Kong. Dismantling the Scaffold was considered "an introduction to a new cultural monument in the city." The exhibition was curated by Christina Li, who organized several projects during her tenure as Spring's director between 2015 and 2017.

== Publications ==
Spring produced a group of publications that used non-traditional publishing and production formats. A Fictional Residency (2013) and The HK FARMers’ Almanac (2015) were produced by writers onsite in a book-sprint format. Stationary 1 was distributed hand-to-hand as a gift; Stationary 2 arrived in email inboxes at the recipient's invitation. The ten seconds that determine whether A gets made into a work was a two-volume pocket set from artist Wong Wai Yin.
