= Christopher Ho =

Hong Kong-American artist (born 1974)

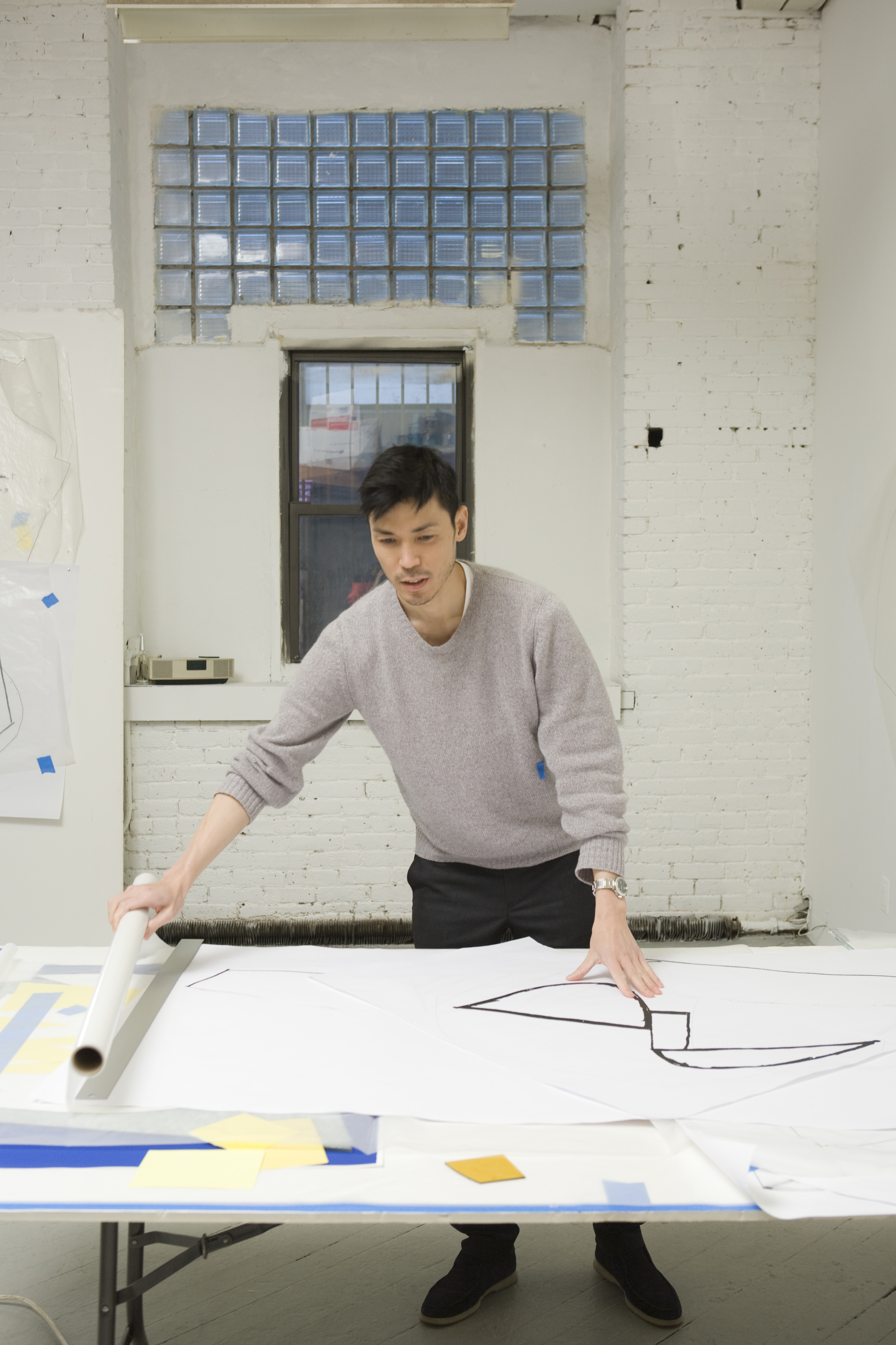
Christopher K. Ho in 2013

Christopher K. Ho (born 1974, in Hong Kong) is an artist and curator who lives and works in New York City. He graduated from Cornell University in 1997 with a B.F.A. and Columbia University in 2003 with an M.Phil.

His work has been exhibited at MassMoCa, Dallas Contemporary, Jamaica Center for Arts & Learning, Queens Museum of Art, and Socrates Sculpture Park. He is represented by 56 Henry in New York, and PHD Group in Hong Kong.

Ho has taught at Rhode Island School of Design and Cranbrook Academy of Art. From 2010 to 2011, he was the Critical Studies Teaching Fellow at Cranbrook Academy of Art.

In September 2021, Ho took up the role of Executive Director of Asia Art Archive, succeeding Claire Hsu.

== Exhibitions ==
Solo Exhibitions:

- 2018 "CX 888", de Sarthe Artist Residency x Forever & Today featuring Christopher K. Ho, Hong Kong, 17 July - 31 August, 2018
- 2013 "Demoiselles d'Avignon", Y Gallery, New York
- 2013 "Privileged White People", Forever & Today, Inc., New York
- 2010 Regional Painting, Winkleman Gallery, New York
- 2009 Et in Arcadia Eco, Galeria EDS, Mexico City
- 2008 Happy Birthday, Winkleman Gallery, New York

Project Rooms:

- 2011 Single Channel: Lesbian Mountains in Love, Des Moines Art Center, Des Moines, IA
- 2010 Like Death, New Mexico Will Catch Up with You in the End (with Kevin Zucker), Fisher Press, Santa Fe, NM

Site Specific Installations:

- 2010 The Pavilion of Realism, Other Gallery, Shanghai
- 2008 Busan Biennale, APEC Naru Park, Busan, Korea
- 2008 Cultivate, MASS MoCA at the Berkshire Botanical Gardens, Stockbridge, MA
- 2008 Estacionarte, MACO, Mexico City
- 2007 Jamaica Flux, Jamaica Center for Arts & Learning, New York
- 2003 Float, Socrates Sculpture Park, New York
- 2001 Crossing the Line, Queens Museum of Art, New York

Selected Group Exhibitions:

- 2012 "LOVE: Conceptual Strategies in Contemporary Painting", ART BLOG ART BLOG, One River Gallery, NJ (curator Stephen Truax)
- 2012 "Cultural Tranference", Elizabeth Foundation for the Arts, NY (curator Sara Reisman)
- 2012 "Tell Me What You REALLY Feel", Center for Book Arts, NY (curator Alex Campos)
- 2012 "Bound by Silence", Dowd Gallery SUNY Corland (curator Heather Powell)
- 2012 "The Meeting", ISCP Gallery, Brooklyn, NY (curators Nick Kline and Monika Wuhrer)
- 2011 No Object Is an Island, Cranbrook Art Museum, MI
- 2011 Flag Day, Islip Art Museum, NY
- 2010 Intangible Interferences, Momenta, NY
- 2010 Seedlings, Dallas Contemporary, TX
- 2010 Room without a View, Freies Museum, Berlin
- 2010 White Night, Markus Winter Gallery, Berlin
- 2010 The Tenants, 106 Green, Brooklyn, NY
- 2009 Incheon Women Artists' Biennale, Incheon, Korea

== Curation ==
- 2011 In the Wake of 2013, Incheon Women Artists' Biennale, Tuning Section, Co-curator
- 2009 El Museo del Ghetto: and Jose Ruiz, G Fine Art, Washington, D.C., Curator
- 2008 The Shallow Curator, Winkleman Gallery, NY, Co-curator

== Writings ==
- "The Clinton Crew: Privileged White Art," WOW HUH, March 31, 2012.
- "Fiction: Laocoön Strikes Back," No Object Is an Island: Dialogues with the Cranbrook Collection (exhibition catalogue), Bloomfield Hills: Cranbrook, 2011.
- "Critic's HQ," Incheon Biennale (exhibition catalogue), Incheon: IWAB, 2011.
- "Reflections on a Future that Might Have Been," JamaicaFlux (exhibition catalogue), New York: Jamaica Center for Arts & Learning, 2005.
