= Vũ Đình Long =

Vietnamese playwright (1896–1960)

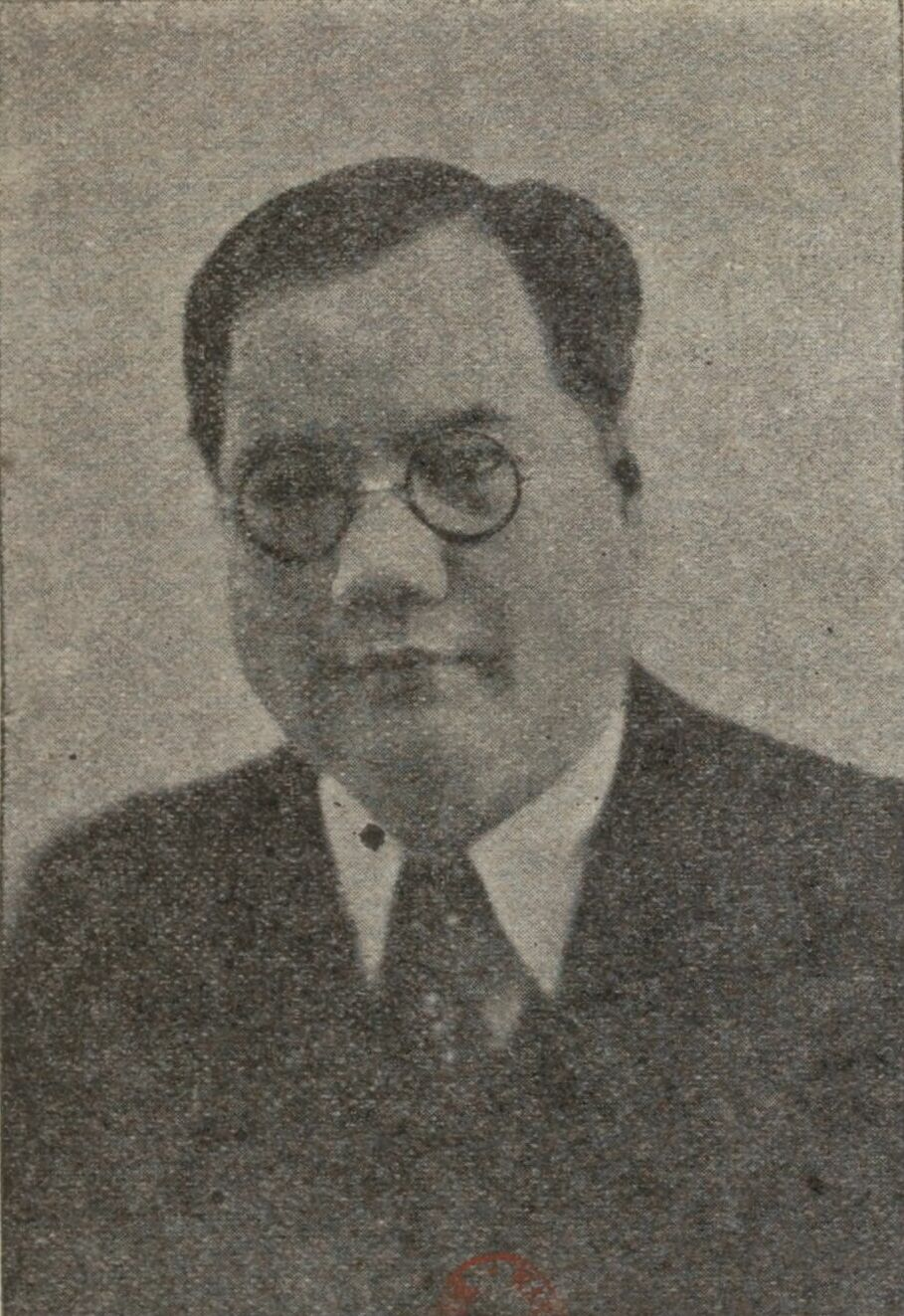
Vũ Đình Long

Vũ Đình Long (19 December 1896 - 14 August 1960) was a Vietnamese dramatist noted for the first western style spoken play in Vietnamese - A cup of Poison in 1921.

The Western-influenced style of "théâtre parlé" (kịch nói) was a departure from traditional Vietnamese theatre. Long's play Chén thuốc độc was performed on the Hanoi Opera House stage on the evening of October 20, 1921. The play was performed by the Văn hóa (Culture) drama company. Vũ Đình Long, like the younger Nam Xương, adopted western techniques, but retained an idealization of Vietnamese patriarchal life. In 1943 Long joined the Hội Văn hóa Cứu quốc - the National Salvation Culture Society.

== Works ==
- Chén thuốc độc A cup of Poison 1921
- Toà án lương tâm (kịch, 1923)
- Đàn bà mới New Women 1944
- Tổ quốc trên hết - Fatherland Above All (screenplay, 1953)

His collected works were published as Tuyển tập kịch Vũ Đình Long by NXB. Hội nhà văn, 2009. He also wrote textbooks, Thế giới trẻ em (1927) Quốc âm độc bản (1932).

== Family ==
His son was the painter Vũ Dân Tân.
