= Johnson Chang =

Chinese art curator (born 1951)

Johnson Chang (Cantonese: Chang Tsong-zung; Chinese: 張頌仁) (born 1951) is a curator and dealer of contemporary Chinese art. He is a co-founder of the Asia Art Archive (AAA) in Hong Kong and a guest professor of the China Academy of Art in Hangzhou. The New York Times described him as "a force in contemporary Chinese art since the 1980s", and Sotheby's described him as "the godfather of contemporary Chinese art".

== Career ==
Chang Tsong-zung was born in 1951 in Hong Kong; his father was an engineer and his grandfather was a banker. He graduated from Williams College in 1973. He has been curating art exhibitions since the 1980s. He founded Hanart TZ gallery in Hong Kong in 1983. Artists that Chang has discovered include Feng Mengbo, Gu Wenda, Liu Wei, Fang Lijun, Wang Guangyi, Yue Minjun, Zhan Wang, and Zhang Xiaogang.

It was through his gallery that he organized exhibitions of the Taiwanese sculptor Ju Ming at the Singapore Art Museum in 1986 and Place Vendôme in Paris in 1997. It was also with Hanart that he staged "China’s New Art Post-1989," which debuted at the 1993 Hong Kong Arts Festival and then toured the United States from 1995 to 1997.

In Shanghai in late 2010, Chang organized "West Heavens," a contemporary art collaboration between China and India.

In their annual "The Power 100" listing, Art Review named Chang, alongside Claire Hsu, for their co-founding of the AAA.

== Personal ==
Chang is known for wearing old-fashioned Chinese-styled outfits with Mandarin collars.

He was a friend of the late Sir David Tang, founder of Shanghai Tang. Chang helped Tang put together the China Club's art collection. Chang is an active part of Hong Kong's social scene and has been listed in Asia Tatler's "Top List."

He has two sons.

== Shows and projects ==
- "China’s New Art Post-1989" (1993)
- Special Exhibitions at the São Paulo International Biennial (1994 and 1996)
- Hong Kong participation at São Paulo Biennial (1996)
- The Venice Biennial (2001)
- "Power of the Word" series of exhibitions
- "Strange Heaven: Chinese Contemporary Photography"
- "Open Asia International Sculpture Exhibition" in Venice (2005)
- "Yellow Box" series, Guangzhou Triennial (2008)
