= Vi Huyền Đắc =

Vietnamese writer

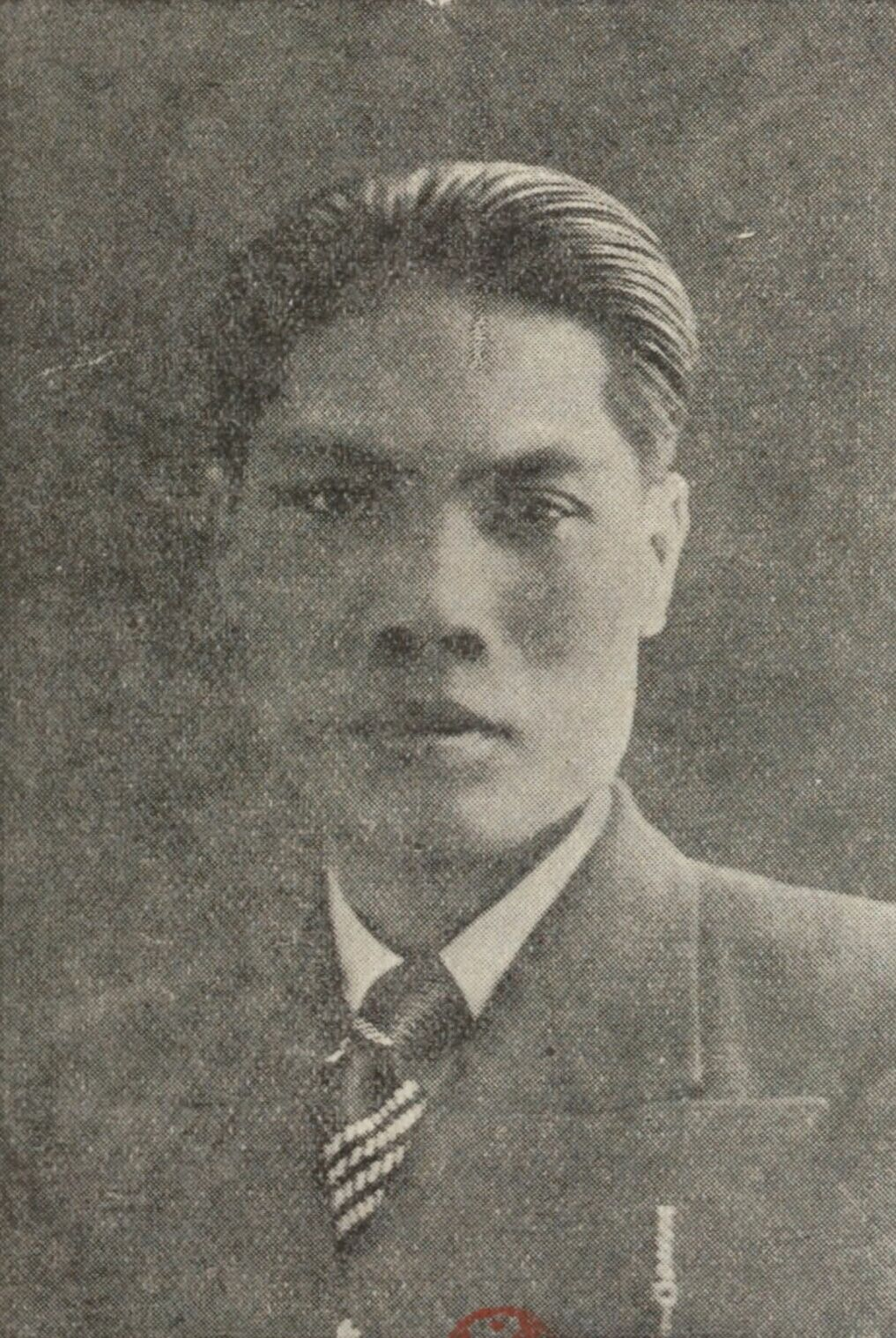
Portrait of writer Vi Huyền Đắc

Vi Huyền Đắc (Hải Ninh, today part of Quảng Ninh, 18 December 1899 - 16 August 1976) was a Vietnamese playwright.

His early works were similar to those of Nam Xuong, poking fun at the Francophile Hanoi bourgeoisie, in 'Ông ký Cóp,' or the play 'Kim tiền' (Money) denouncing greed.

== Works ==
- Gengis Khan (in French) 1962

He was also active as a translator.
