= Inter-Asia Cultural Studies =

- Discipline: Anthropology, area studies, Asian studies, cultural studies
- Language: English
- Edited by: Kuan-Hsing Chen, Chua Beng Huat

Publication details
- History: 2000–present
- Publisher: Routledge
- Frequency: Quarterly
- Impact factor: 0.4 (2024)

Standard abbreviations
- ISO 4: Inter-Asia Cult. Stud.

Indexing
- ISSN: 1464-9373 (print); 1469-8447 (web)
- OCLC no.: 474772273

Links
- Journal homepage; IACS Project website

Inter-Asia Cultural Studies is a quarterly peer-reviewed academic journal with the aim of enhancing the communication and exchange between inter-Asia and other regions of the cultural studies world. It was established in 2000 and is published by Routledge. The editors-in-chief are Chen Kuan-Hsing and Chua Beng Huat.

== Abstracting and indexing ==
The journal is abstracted and indexed in

- Arts & Humanities Citation Index
- CSA Worldwide Political Science Abstracts
- Current Contents/Social & Behavioural Sciences
- International Bibliography of the Social Sciences
- Social Sciences Citation Index
- Scopus
- Sociological Abstracts

According to the Journal Citation Reports, the journal has a 2024 impact factor of 0.4.
