= Vũ Dân Tân =

Vietnamese contemporary artist (1946–2009)

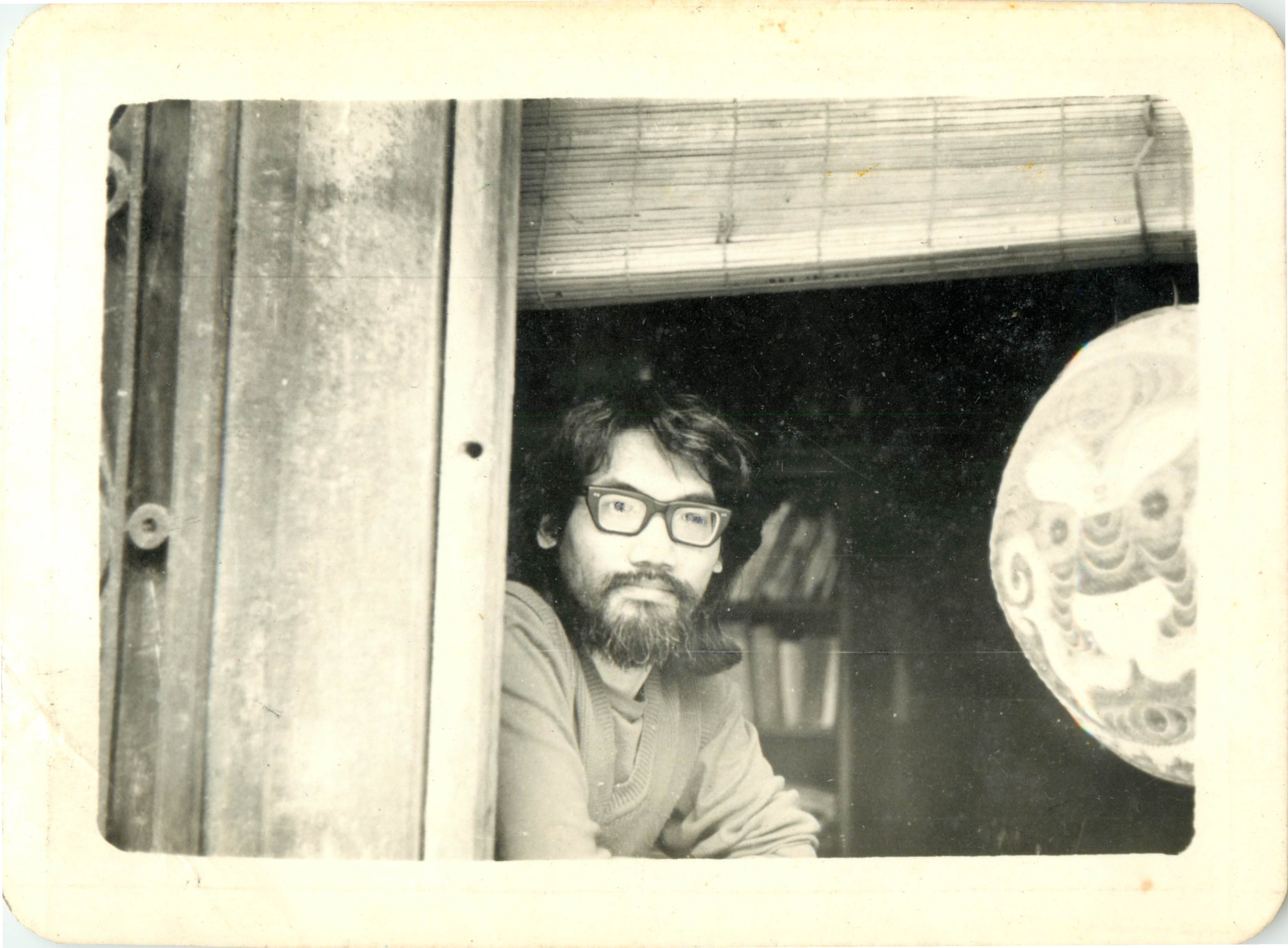
- Vũ Dân Tân at the door of his studio (early 1980s)
- Born: 3 October 1946; Hanoi, Vietnam
- Died: 14 October 2009 (aged 63); Hanoi, Vietnam
- Known for: Installation art, painting, art objects
- Notable work: Money (series), Festival banners (series), Suitcases of a Pilgrim (series), Cadillac-Icarus, Fashion (series), Amazons (series)

Vũ Dân Tân (3 October 1946 in Hanoi – 14 October 2009) was a Vietnamese artist who produced works in various media but was better known for his art objects and installation art. Most of his life he lived in Hanoi, where in 1990, together with his Russian wife Natalia (known as Natasha) Kraevskaia he co-founded Salon Natasha, the first private space for contemporary art and independent forum for creative people. He is considered one of the first protagonists of contemporary art in Vietnam.

== Early life ==
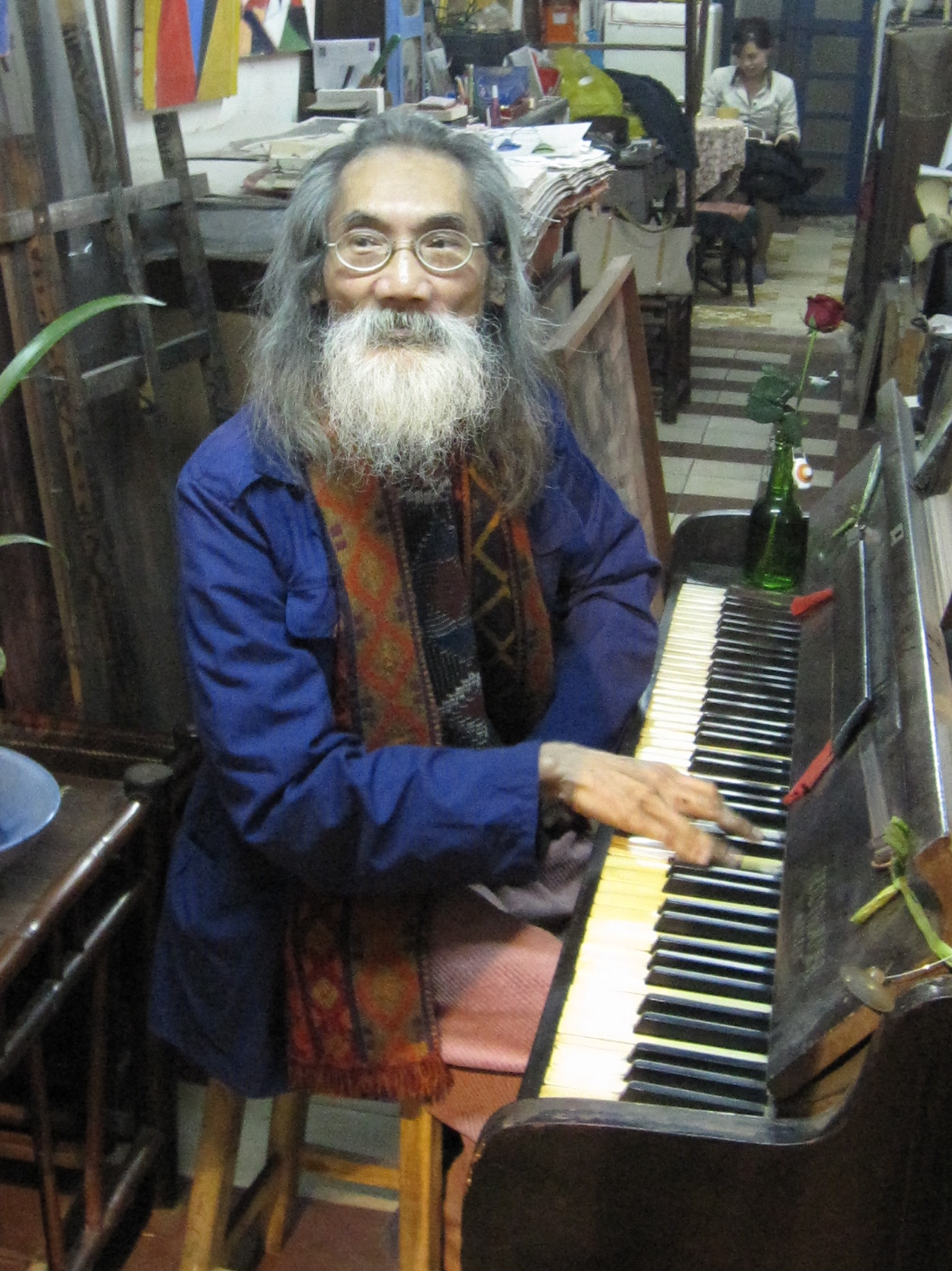
Vu Dan Tan playing piano in his gallery in Hanoi in 2008

Vũ Dân Tân was born in Hanoi, Vietnam. He was the son of the playwright Vũ Đình Long (1896–1960) who is also known as a publisher, the owner of the publishing house Tân Dân. His mother, Mai Ngọc Hà (b. 1927), assisted her husband in his publishing business. In his primary school years Vũ Dân Tân studied drawing under the guidance of the renowned Hanoi painter and educator Ngô Mạnh Quỳnh (1917 – 1991). During his teenage years, he received piano instruction from his cousin, who was a pianist named Lê Thị Liên. Vũ Dân Tân was unable to receive formal art training, but the creative and intellectual environment in his family during his early years has shaped his future endeavors and influenced his artistic work.

== Life and career ==
Due to his drawing skills, Vũ Dân Tân was able to secure a position as an artist-animator, first at Hanoi Film Studio from 1967 to 1972, and later at the Animation Studio of Vietnam National Television from 1972 to 1982. In 1973, he was sent to Havana, Cuba for 9 months to further enhance his professional skills at Cuban Television Animation Studios. In 1981, he set up a personal art studio that served as a gathering place for the intellectual community in Hanoi and foreshadowed the creation of the Salon Natasha.

Between 1987 and 1990, Tân lived in Russia for three and a half years, splitting his time between Moscow and Astrakhan. During this time, he created several series of paintings that were displayed in exhibitions in Moscow and in the Penza Regional Art Gallery. Upon returning from Russia in 1990, he settled down in Hanoi and remained there until his death.

Vũ Dân Tân’s artistic career progressed in stages. In the late 1970's – early 1980s, in addition to two-dimensional images in various styles, he initiated mask-making, taking an interest in the tribal cultures of the country. Throughout these decades, he developed original expressive idioms, with an increasing focus on three-dimensional pieces, often produced from found organic materials and everyday objects.

It is with his three-dimensional objects, notably his inventive transformations of cigarette packaging, that the artist was invited to the Second Asia-Pacific Triennial of Contemporary Art at the Queensland Art Gallery in 1996. Since then, he was involved in numerous international contemporary art exhibitions in countries such as Finland, Germany, Hong Kong, Singapore, Taiwan, USA, etc.

== Artistic work ==
Vũ Dân Tân’s wide-ranging art practice covers such domains as mask-making, drawing, painting, printmaking, art-objects, sculpture and installations. He also composed and performed piano music. Recurrent themes in Vu Dan Tan’s art are universal and include freedom, beauty, woman as an icon, identity and power. His art, in form and concept discloses his playful social dissidence.

Masks

Vũ's so-called masks, produced over decades, made from woven flat baskets, dried fruit shells, and bamboo trunk pieces, were recognised for their originality in the late-1990s. The Basket Masks series, borrowing familiar iconographic elements “transforms and reinterprets these to propose new, open narratives unknown in traditional culture”, writes art historian Iola Lenzi, who additionally sees in them a performative ethos. She also traces Vũ Dân Tân’s 1990s breakthroughs to the “conceptual evolution started with his basket series of the late 1970s”. These masks, although not performed, suggest Vietnam’s traditional theatre and performativity, moreover, “In their intertwining of the visual and potential for improvised viewer response, Basket Masks harbor characteristics of installation, unknown in Vietnam in the 1970s.”

Drawing and painting

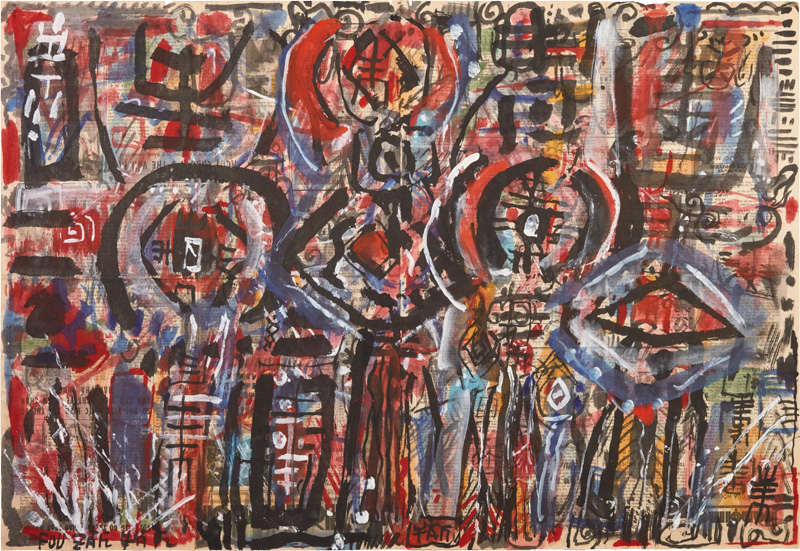
Festival Banner (1992-1993), from the Festival Banners series, private collection, Hanoi, Vietnam

Drawing and painting develop periodically from the middle 1970s till the end of the artist’s life. The diverse figurative and abstract paintings of the 1980s give way to the voluminous Festival banners series (1989-1994) sporadically produced during six years these gouaches on traditional dó paper and newspapers introduce an unknown but inclusive iconographic language which comprises images resembling Chinese characters, patterns of minority’s textiles, Christian motifs and shamanistic masks and banners. These emblems reference to village life and social practices that may contradict still-prevailing political edicts.

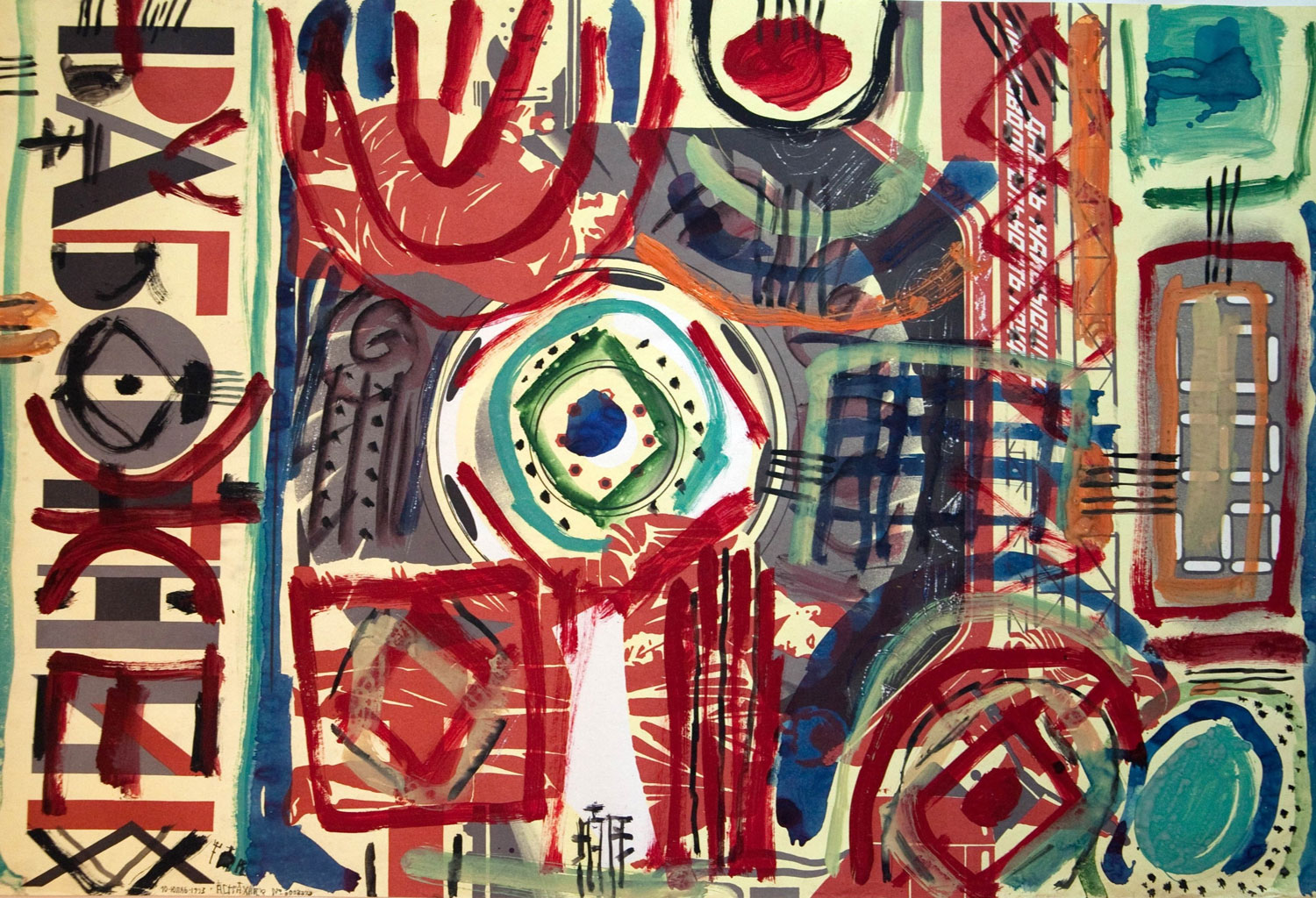
Russian Posters series, detail (1993), exhibited at the National Gallery Singapore in 2015

The artist’s works from the Russian period (1987 -1990) include human portraiture (Vũ Dân Tân made a living as a street artist in Astrakhan), cityscapes and abstract paintings. During his second visit to Russia in 1993-1994, Vũ produced the painting series on Soviet political posters: one featured clerical imagery that alluded to contradictions between required religious humility and brutal historical reality, while another demonstrated the artist’s interpretation of communist slogans.

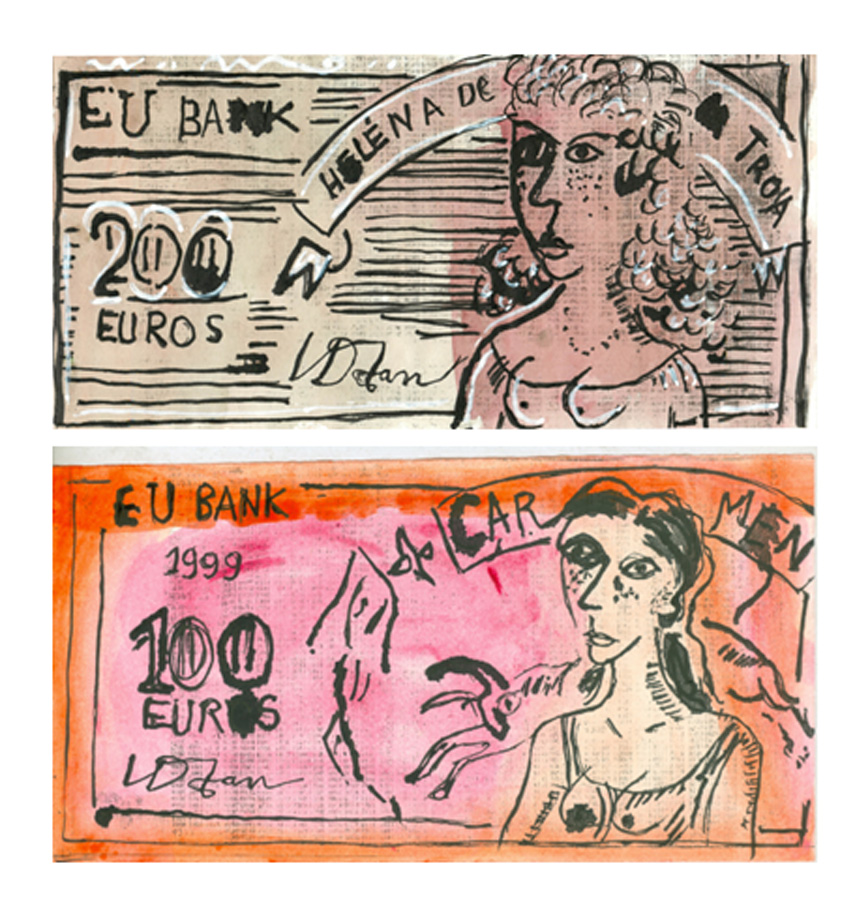
Euro Currencies, Money series (1999), exhibited at Arter art center, Istanbul, Turkey

In the middle 1990s, in his two-dimensional works on varied themes, Vũ employed unusual forms of support - newspapers, journal pages, and calendars, often incorporating his own textual statements. One of the largest series, Money, was created from the early-1990s into the 2000s referring to the concepts of state, nation, economy, trade, borders, and desire for borderless freedom. Most of the works from this series include textual insertions in the form of known slogans and quotations, which demonstrate artist’s eccentric humor, such as “Napoleon ou rien” (“Napoleon or nothing”), “Millionario o Muerte” (“Millionaires or Death”, a transformation from “Patria o muetre!”) or his social concern as in “Quo vadis?” and “L’homme sans pays” (“A man without a country”). The last ones frequently appear alongside a picture of the artist as a pilgrim. The idea of pilgrimage is linked to both artist’s real life and fictitious journeys, “as well as to dreams of liberating from geographical, racial, national or political constraints”. Most of the euro money bills are united by Tân’s favorite quotation from Dostoevsky: “Beauty will save the world”, undermining power of the real money in commercialized society. Over the decade the series evolved when after 1996 the artist developed dollar-scaled, duplicated and hand-coloured currency notes (dollars, euros, etc.), The substitution of official figures representing state power by personas belonging to the global cultural pantheon on the artist’s banknotes “indirectly subverts the nation’s monolithic discourse of history and authority.” Moreover, with its potential for circulation “Intellectually elegant, medium-savvy, aesthetically accessible, and subtly critical, Vu Dan Tan’s money series embodies Southeast Asia contemporary practice at its most accomplished”.

Printmaking

Artist printmaking work include woodblock prints and lithography. A series of lithographs dedicated to the travelling circus and a series depicting New Zealand Dollars were made in 1996 in Auckland (New Zealand) in the lithography studio MUKA. Woodblock printing technique in Vũ's art practice was represented both by the separate works and by the artists’ books.

Art objects and installations

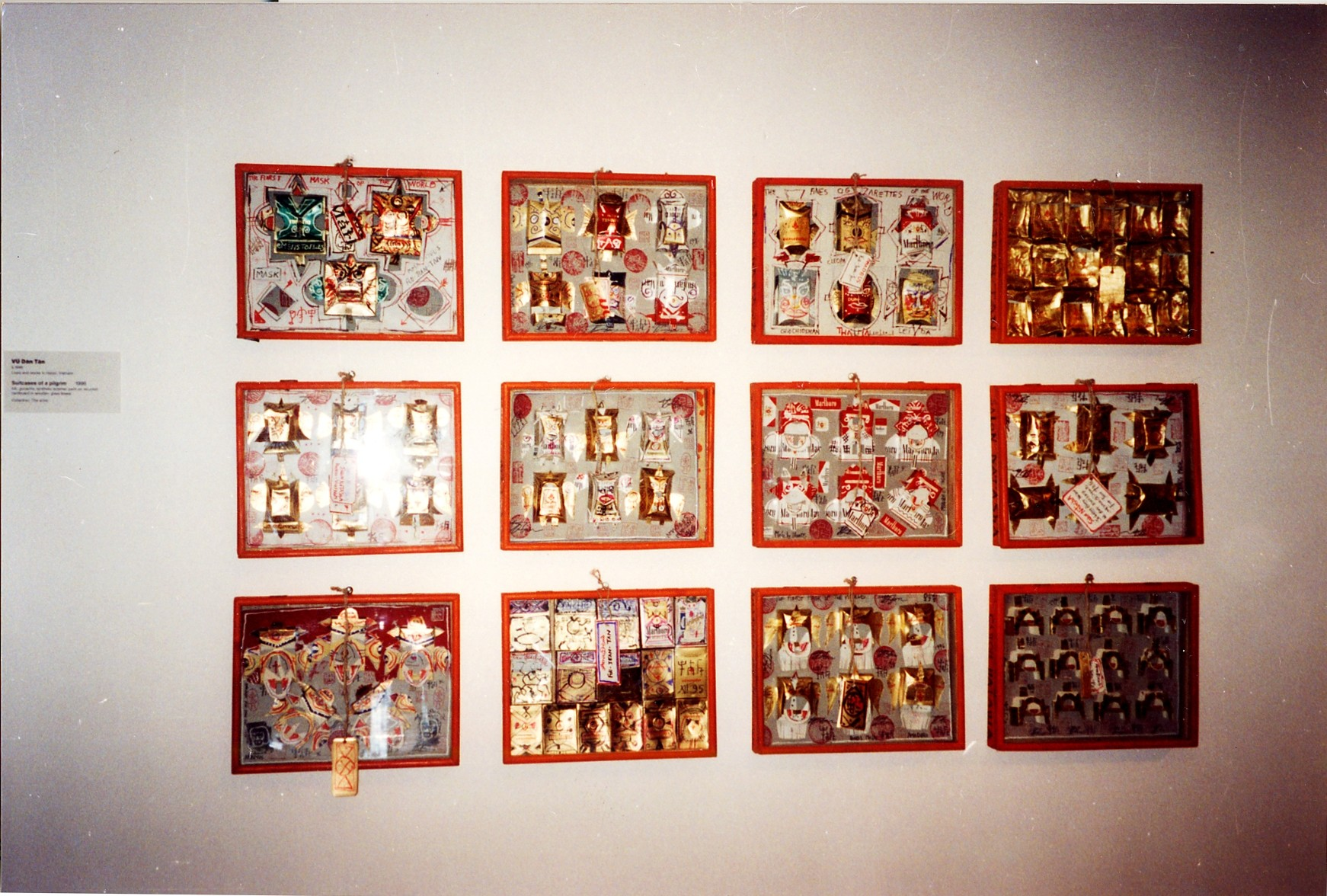
Suitcases of a Pilgrim (1996), installation exhibited at the 2nd Asia Pacific Biennial, in the collection of the Queensland Art Gallery, Brisbane, Australia

Vũ Dân Tân’s passion for creating art objects resulted in his most famous series of 3-dimensional works Suitcases of a Pilgrim, begun mid-1990s or earlier, and developed periodically until 2006. Cardboard packaging boxes (mostly cigarette boxes) were cut out, painted by the artist, and thus transformed into small size sculptures. They were arranged in wooden boxes with glass lids which were used by street-sellers for the trade of cigarettes and other small goods in the 1980s - 1990s that allowed them to quickly pick up the box and disappear when the police approached. Prof. Ian Howard, who was curator of Vietnamese art for the 2nd Asia-Pacific Triennial and selected Vũ’s Suitcases of a Pilgrim for exhibiting, wrote that these pieces “ambiguously – that is, either intuitively or deliberately – proclaim an irrational response to the coercive nature and intent of institutional life.”

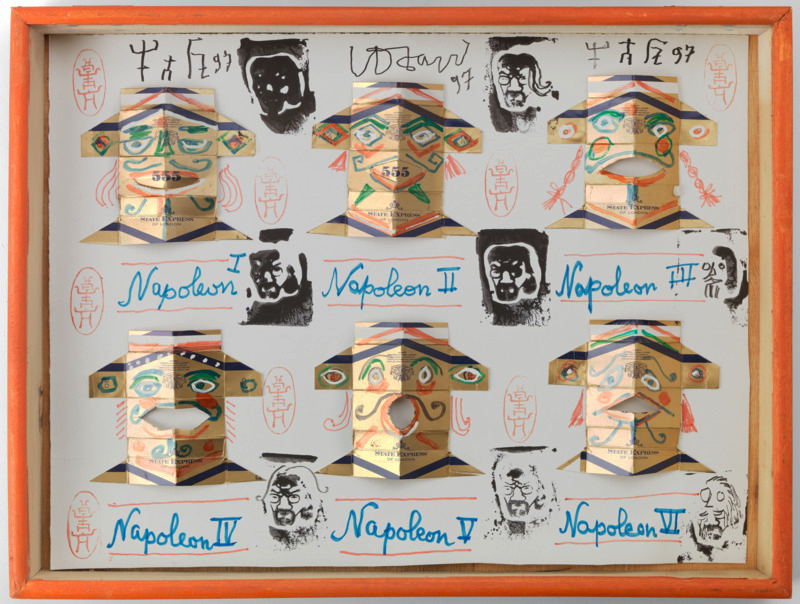
Suitcases of a Pilgrim: Napoleon (1997), from the series, in the collection of the National Gallery of Australia, Canberra

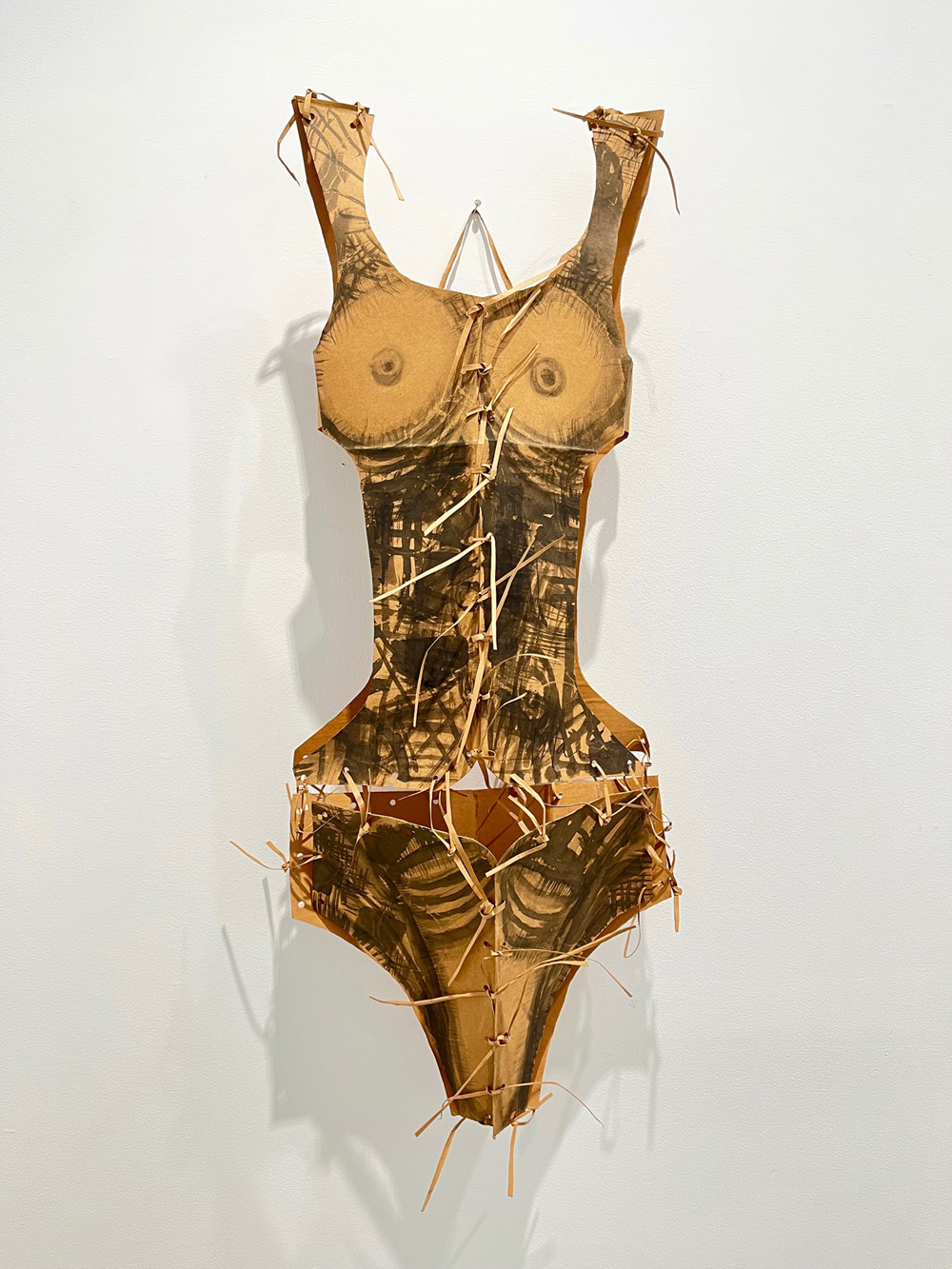
Fashion (2002), from the Fashion series, in the collection of the Fukuoka Asian Art Museum, Fukuoka, Japan

Series Fashion, which arose at the turn of the millennium and developed until the artist’s death, represents human-scale costumes-like objects-sculptures “made out of recuperated cardboard and carefully folded, cut, manipulated, perforated, painted” to reference women. Along with explorations of the complicated woman-icon, the works embody various tensions: strength and domination, presence and absence, public and private.

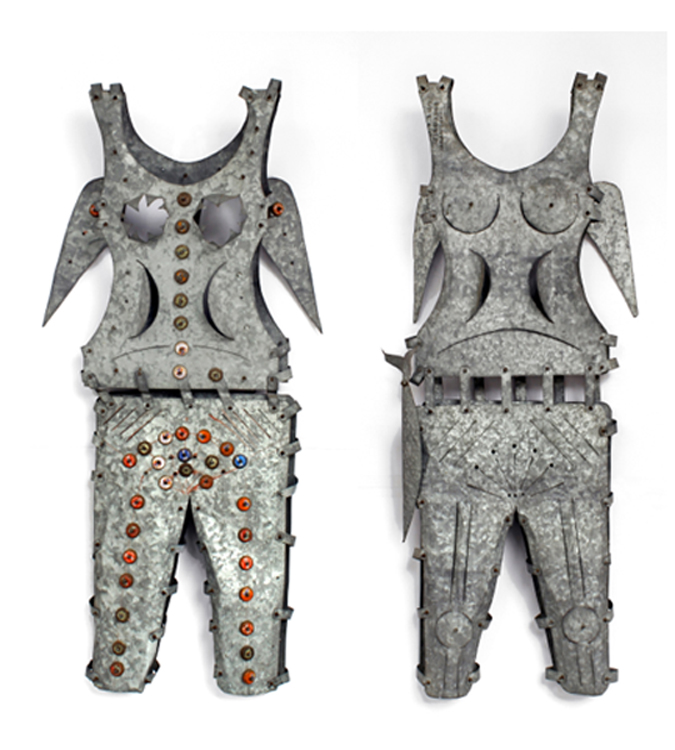
Amazon series no.8, 9, 2001-2004, exhibited and in the collection of the Singapore Art Museum

Vũ's Amazon series of sheet-metal costume-installations, produced in 2001-2009, is a "sharper, colder version of cardboard 'Fashion'. Shiny and stiffly armor-like evoking protection, exclusion, and violence even more pointedly than the paper suits, the metal costume-armors are more visually strident and less tactile than their cardboard counterparts, closer to classical sculpture in their solemnity and solidity.”

A significant three-dimensional work Cadillac–Icarus was created by Vũ Dân Tân in 1999 during his art residency at the Pacific Bridge Gallery, Oakland, CA. The artist recycled a real Cadillac 1961 into a sculpture and painted it gold. In 2000, Pacific Bridge Gallery took the initiative to ship Cadillac–Icarus to Vietnam and to shoot a film about its journey (film “Icarus – the Art of Vu Dan Tan”, dir. Nicholas Brooks).

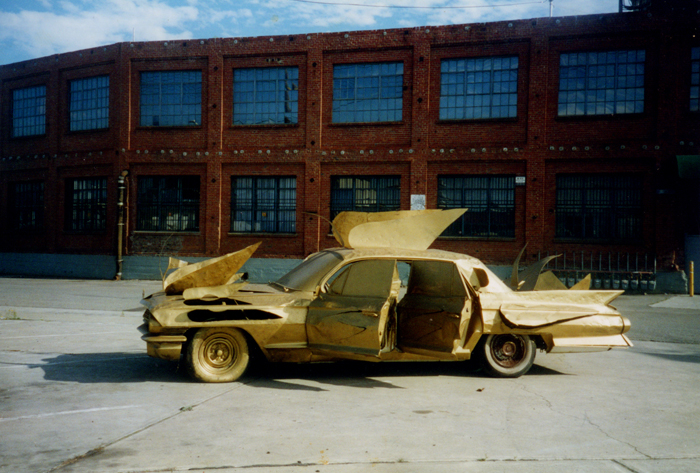
Cadillac-Icarus (1999) exhibited in the Pacific Art gallery, Oakland, USA

Vũ Dân Tân’s performative Cadillac–Icarus, in its supposed drive through Hanoi streets, operated as a reference to freedom and prosperity, while obliquely questioning the status quo. The work is also interpreted as scrutinizing “the critical intersection of history and globalization in turn-of-the-millennium Hanoi.” According to Lenzi “By infiltrating public streets Cadillac/Icarus brought complex ideas and contradictions to all, embodying the accessible critical language of contemporary art.” The closing event of this project was a greeting of Cadillac- Icarus at his final destination, which turned into a one day long improvised performance with the artist Đào Anh Khánh acting as Icarus and a group of Vietnamese visual artists playing music on traditional instruments and loose car parts. Few years later Cadillac – Icarus reappeared in a series of Vũ's monoprints. However, artist’s intention to use different vehicles for outdoor interactive sculptures / installations was introduced earlier, in 1997, in series of sketches for a sculpture project of the Hong Kong University of Science and Technology, which was never realized.

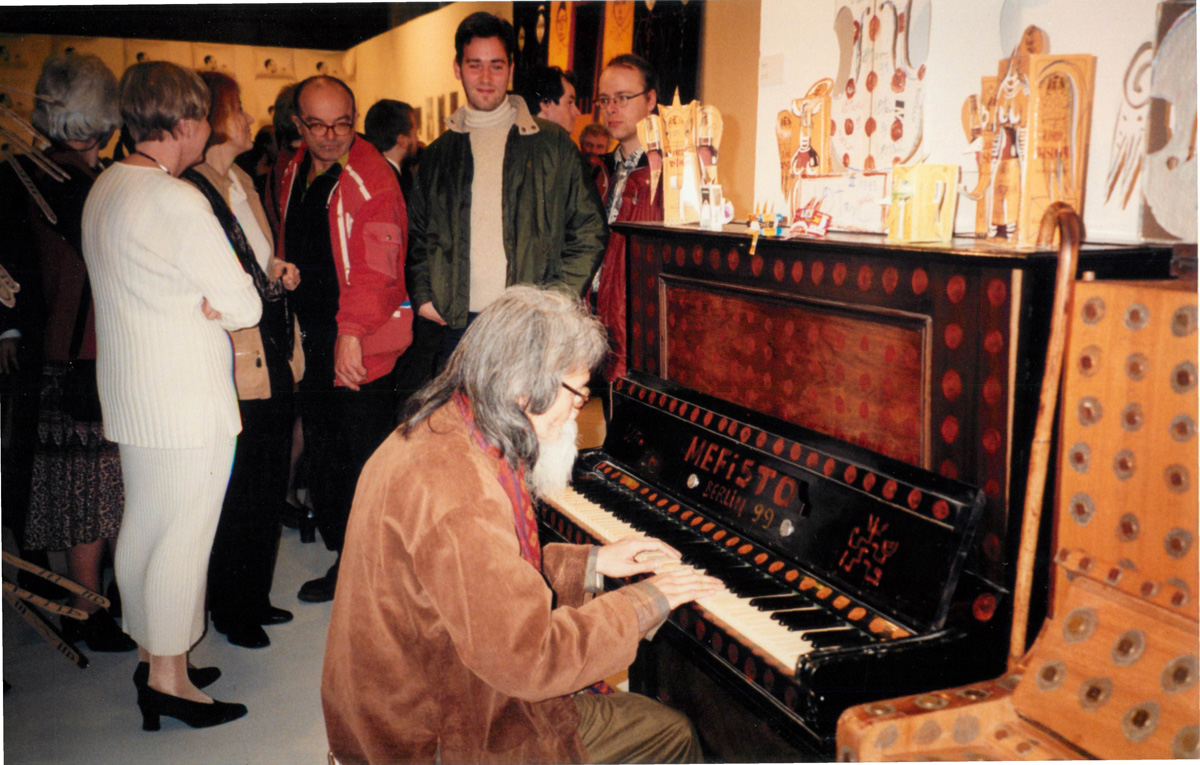
Vu Dan Tan is playing piano of his installation Spring at the opening of the exhibition Gap Viet Nam (1999), House of the World Cultures, Berlin, Germany

Vũ Dân Tân who himself was a good musician and composed piano music, during the decades of his artistic career incorporated sound and music into his visual practice. Some of his works are recycled and painted records and record-players; others are art objects recalling musical instruments. He also made a few installations and performances referring to the theme of music such as the three-piano installation Spring at the group exhibition Gặp Việt Nam (House of the World Cultures, Berlin, 1999), History of the Hands (filmed sound performance, Hanoi, 2000), sound installation One Day which incorporates street sound and Vũ’s piano playing in a course of one day (featured at the group show Out of context, Huntington Beach Art Centre, CA, USA, 2005), and others. The works from this cycle reveal the conceptual linkages with the city’s physical and social space and with ideas of transformation, rebirth and freedom. Analyzing music related works by the artist, the art historian Iola Lenzi asserts, that “in the 1990s Vu Dan Tan’s persistent incorporation of music or music’s features into his visual practice, and the way in which Tan mined sound’s formlessness and conceptual properties, was unknown in Southeast Asian art at that time, showing Vu Dan Tan and Vietnamese art’s important contribution to recent Southeast Asian art history.”

== Exhibitions ==
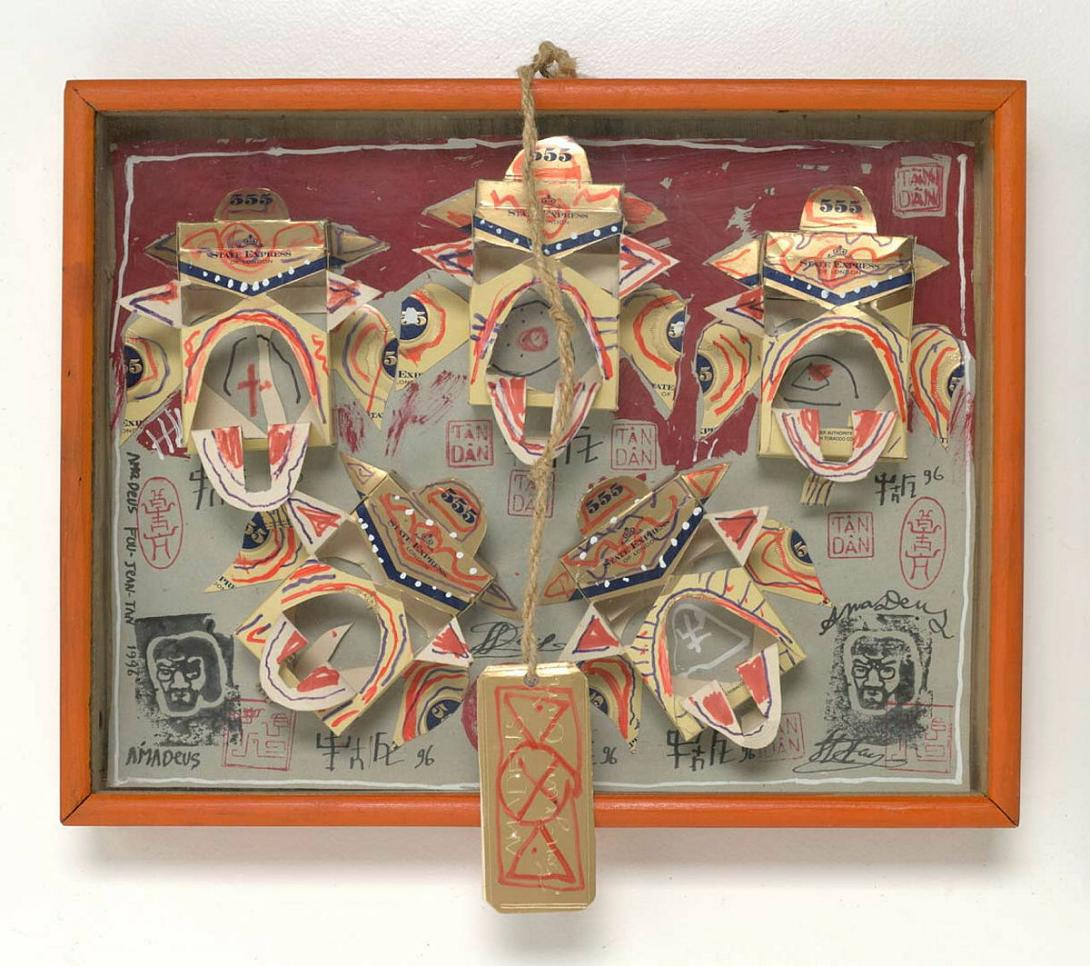
Suitcases of a Pilgrim, installation detail (1996), in the collection of the Queensland Art Gallery, Brisbane, Australia

The works of Vũ Dân Tân have been exhibited in Vietnam, but mainly abroad. He has participated in few art triennials, such as the 2nd Asia-Pacific Triennial of Contemporary Art, Queensland Art Gallery, Brisbane, Australia (1996), Osaka Triennale, 10th International Contemporary Art Competition, Osaka Contemporary Art Center, Osaka, Japan (2001); and 8th Sculpture Triennial (Triennale Kleinplastik), Fellbach, Germany (2001).

He had 19 solo exhibitions, among them are 24 gouaches of Vũ Dân Tân, Association of Literature and Art, Hanoi, Vietnam (1989); exhibition in Penza Regional Art Gallery, Russia (1990); RienСarNation (with Le Hong Thai), Pacific Bridge Gallery, Oakland, CA, USA (1999); Lion’s masks and Venus, Goethe Institute, Hanoi, Vietnam (1999); Vu Dan Tan and Nguyen Quang Huy, Atelier Frank & Lee, Singapore (2001); Other banks, the State Gallery of Fine Arts, Astrakhan, Russia (2002); Tanorigami, gallery Art-U room, Tokyo, Japan (2006); Money for all times, Salon Natasha, Hanoi, Vietnam (2010); Life in Trips: Vũ Dân Tân, Photography and multimedia Centre “Kul’t”, Astrakhan, Russia (2013); Venus in Vietnam (with Nguyen Nghia Cuong), Ho Chi Minh City Museum of Fine Arts, Vietnam (2014); Vũ Dân Tân and Music, Goethe Insitut, Hanoi, Vietnam (2016), and others.

The work of Vũ Dân Tân has been featured in more than 60 group exhibitions. Major exhibitions include: Being minorities – Contemporary Asian Art, Hong Kong Art Centre, Hong Kong (1997); River: New Asian Art – A Dialogue in Taipei, Taipei, Taiwan (1997); Inside, International Art Exhibition accompanying Documenta X, Kassel, Germany (1997); Gặp Việt Nam, House of the World Cultures, Berlin, Germany (1999); Subverted Boundaries, Sculpture Square, Singapore (2003); Out of context, Huntington Beach Art Centre, CA, USA (2005); Post Đổi Mới. Vietnamese Art after 1990, Singapore Art Museum, Singapore (2008); Intersection Vietnam: new Works from North & South, Valentine Willie Fine Art, Kuala Lumpur – Singapore (2009); Ascending Dragon: Contemporary Vietnamese Artists, Armory Center for the Arts, Pasadena (LA), USA (2010); Negotiating Home, History and Nation. Two decades of contemporary art in Southeast Asia 1991-2011, Singapore Art Museum, Singapore (2011); Concept Context Contestation: Art and the Collective in Southeast Asia, Bangkok Art and Culture Centre, Bangkok, Thailand (2013; and traveling, 2014-2019, Hanoi, Yogyakarta, Yangon, in collaboration with Goethe Institut, Southeast Asia); Féminité, Espace Croix-Baragnon, festival ‘Made in Asia’, Toulouse, France (2014); The Roving Eye. Contemporary Art from Southeast Asia, ARTER (art center), Istanbul, Turkey (2014); Forme e Anti Forme. Commemorating the Brussels Days during Expo Milano 2015, Milan, Italy (2015); Between declarations and Dreams: Art of Southeast Asia since the 19th Century, National Gallery Singapore, Singapore (2015); “Mở cửa” – Mỹ thuật 30 năm thời kỳ đổi mới (1986 – 2016) / “Be open – 30 years of fine art after Doi Moi (1986 – 2016), Vietnam National Museum of Fine Arts, Hanoi, Vietnam (2016); Collectionner–le désir inachevé, Musée des Beaux-Arts d’Angers, France (2017); Stealing Public Space–How Southeast Asian contemporary art co-opts the city and other collective sites, The Substation, Singapore (2020); Beyond the boundaries of geography, canons and convention – the art of Emeric Feješ and Vũ Dân Tân, within the framework of the official programme “Novi Sad -European Capital of Culture 2022”, Novi Sad, Serbia (2022).

== Public collections ==
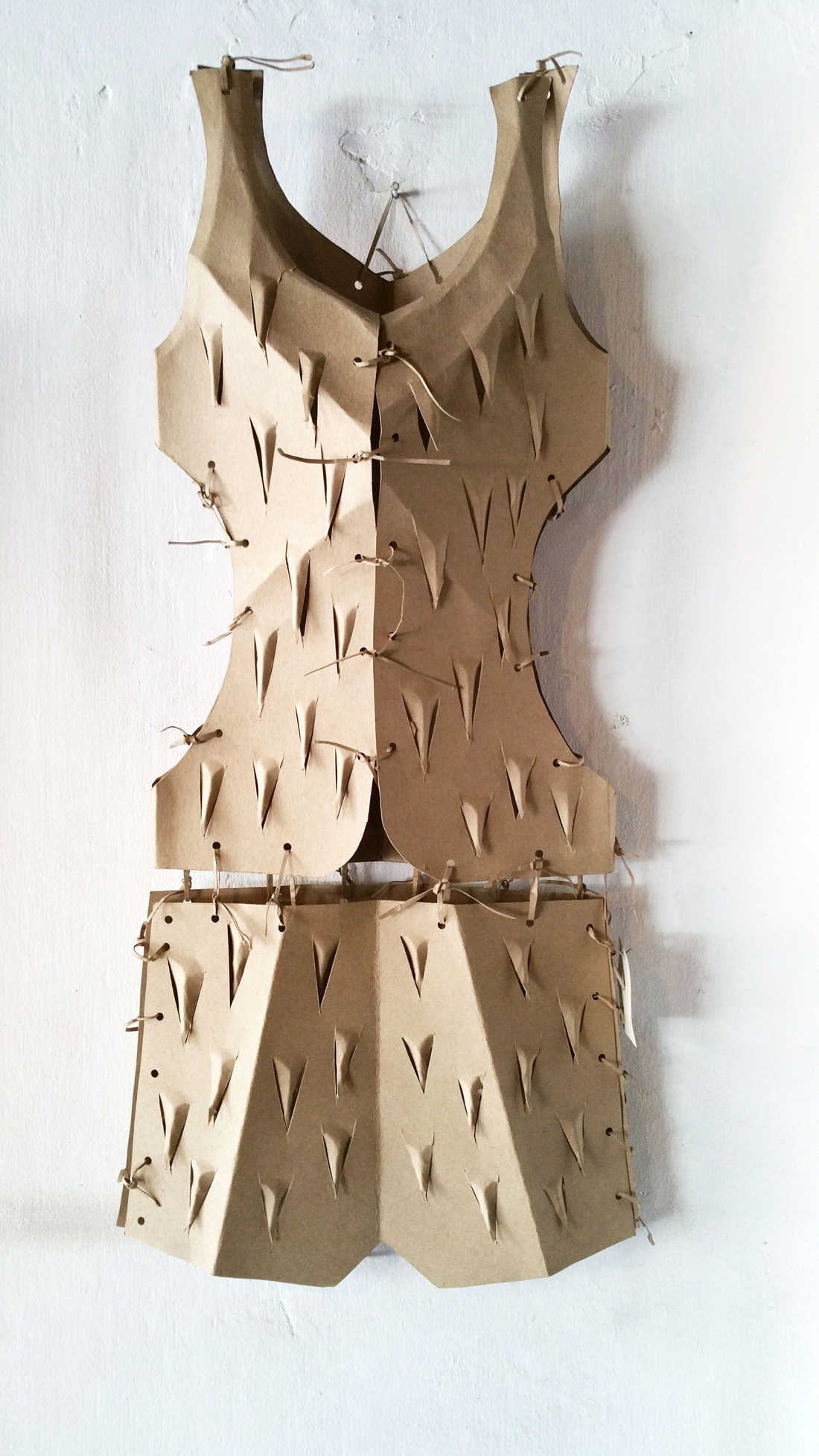
Fashion 31 (2009), from Fashion series, exhibited at the festival ‘Made in Asia’, Toulouse, France, and ‘Forme e Anti Forme’ during Expo Milano 2015, Milan, Italy

Vũ Dân Tân’s works are in the institutional collections of:

- National Gallery of Australia, Canberra, Australia;
- Queensland Art Gallery, Brisbane, Australia;
- Fukuoka Asian Art Museum, Fukuoka, Japan;
- Museum of New Zealand Te Papa Tongarewa, Wellington, New Zealand;
- The State Gallery of Fine Arts, Astrakhan, Russia;
- Penza Regional Art Gallery, Russia;
- Singapore Art Museum, Singapore

and some other institutions in Asia and USA.
