= Salon Natasha =

Salon Natasha was Vietnam’s first private contemporary art space established in 1990 by the late artist Vũ Dân Tân (1946–2009) and his Russian wife Natalia (Natasha) Kraevskaia.Located in their home and Vu Dan Tan’s studio at 30 Hang Bong, Hanoi, it functioned outside of the legal framework and was free from any official interference. It was the first venue in Hanoi to exhibit young, experimental and non-commercial artists, as well as a meeting spot for creative people and intellectuals. Proclaiming its main goal as freedom of expression, during its almost two decades of activities, Salon Natasha has organized around one hundred artistic events extending from curated exhibitions to creative collaborations, spontaneous performances and international exchanges. Many of the country’s leading contemporary artists started their career at Salon Natasha.

While the Vietnamese art scene was often monitored by the centralized government, in terms of both activities and art forms, Salon Natasha provided an autonomous space and played a major role in liberating artistic production.

In 2005, Salon Natasha terminated its exhibition activities, Vu Dan Tan once again turned the space into his art studio but kept its doors open to the public. After his death in 2009 it was transformed into a commemorative space which existed until 2017.

== History ==
From 1987 to 1990, Vu Dan Tan lived in the Soviet Union, where he witnessed the dramatic shift in visual art after Perestroika. This inspired him to seek change in his own country. During that time, Đổi Mới, a policy of renovation similar to the processes happening in Russia, contrarily to the cultural shifts that he observed in Russia, did not bring any significant change to the Vietnamese art scene. Vu Dan Tan decided to establish a new public space, located right in his home. It could provide new opportunities for innovation and serve as a place where like-minded people, committed to art, could gather. He decided to name it ‘Salon’ in the French-Russian sense, implying that its goal would be not just to organize exhibitions, but also to host various cultural events and to encourage artist-audience dialogues.

As a platform for the exchange of ideas, Salon Natasha thus continued the tradition that began in Tan’s studio which had been known as a gathering place for Hanoi bohemian circles and intelligentsia since the late 1970s.

== Concept ==
Salon Natasha was a space where artists felt free to experiment with art making practices without the pressure of having to consent either with the market or the State’s guidelines. Moreover, it never had the look of a "white cube" gallery, quite the contrary, it combined the aesthetics of its original use – a living space with an artist studio and exhibition capacities. Salon Natasha was a living organism that could adapt to the needs of artists that utilized the space for their projects and to engage public in a creative atmosphere. All activities carried out by Salon Natasha were self-supported and were never sponsored by outside entities.

== Art in Salon Natasha, exhibitions and projects ==
Contrary to the art works in government-run spaces and official exhibitions which, in the 1990s, still featured typical socialist realist topics, and as compared to the art of commercial galleries, the art shown at Salon Natasha was radically different. Topics ran from classical subjects to the ones that were taboo in the official setting, such as those related to social contradictions and social critique, community values, inner psychological issues, sexuality, and personal religious expressions, among others.

In addition to paintings and drawings, Salon Natasha also introduced art objects, installation, experimental photography, cross-disciplinary interactive events, and performance, forms which had just begun to penetrate the Vietnamese artistic landscape in the early 1990s.

At the time when exhibitions in Hanoi were generally labeled according to artists’ selected mediums, or according to the number of participating artists, but not by theme, Salon Natasha introduced a different approach whereby exhibitions were based on specific ideas or concepts. The first group exhibition in Salon Natasha was titled Red and Yellow. Other group shows, to name a few, were titled Music, Composition: Movement and Immobility, and Icon of Our Time.

Salon Natasha also initiated many collaborative ventures that resulted in exhibitions, public events and lasting relationships between artists. These include strong bonds that were forged among the artists of Salon while they were working together at the Bát Tràng ceramic village, or while producing art clocks in the Salon for the exhibition 12 O’Clock, or jointly creating works on fabric banners, and co-producing a painting performance on stage during a music concert.

Most of the exhibitions were conceptualized and organized (until the late 1990s the word “curate” was still unknown in Vietnam) by Natasha and French artist Eric Leroux. Leroux lived in Hanoi from 1991 to 1998, and was part of the Salon Natasha artist community. Artists also organized and conceived several exhibitions themselves, such as Medium – Lacquer; Size – Small (concept and management by Bui Huu Hung, 1996) and 12 O’Clock (concept and curatorial execution by Nguyen Van Cuong, 1997).

== Collaborations between Vietnamese and International Artists ==
Starting in the early 1990s, some international artists based in Hanoi participated in Salon Natasha exhibitions and projects on a regular basis. Aside from Eric Leroux (France) this included Maritta Nurmi (Finland), Bradford Edwards (USA), and Brian Ring (Canada). Starting in the mid-1990s, Salon encouraged larger scale collaborations. In 1997, the exhibition Looking in focused on works by international artists influenced by Vietnam and its culture.

In 1996, Salon Natasha initiated a long-term Vietnam-Australia mail art collaborative project called Crosscurrents, curated by Natalia Kraevskaia and Bonney Bombach (Australia) which included six Salon artists and four Australian artists. This project can be considered one of Salon Natasha’s most critical initiatives as it empowered the expansion of a cross-cultural discourse between Vietnamese and international artists. After it was completed in Vietnam, it received an Australian grant that allowed it to tour in ten venues in Australia over two years.

== Exhibitions and educational activity beyond the Salon Natasha Space ==
Projects such as Crosscurrents enabled Salon Natasha to spread its art activities wider than its own physical space and realize or join exhibitions and events, both in Vietnam and abroad. The events organized by Salon Natasha in Hanoi included the exhibition Composition: Movement and Immobility at the French Cultural Centre (1995) among others.

Abroad, Salon organized the project Spirit of Hanoi (or Salon Natasha as an installation) in Finland (curator Maritta Nurmi) and was present at the 12th Asian International Art Exhibition, Macao, 1997, and the 1999 exhibition Gap Viet Nam at the House of the World Cultures in Berlin. Salon Natasha was also involved in numerous charity projects.

From its early years Salon included educational elements in its activity. Vu Dan Tan conducted regular workshops with local children. Many of the Salon’s conceptually-shaped projects contained an educational segment: lectures, conferences and round-tables at spaces provided by other institutions.

== Salon Natasha’s archive as a part of digital collection of Asia Art Archive ==
Salon Natasha’s activity has been archived by Asia Art Archive in cooperation with the co-founder and curator of Salon Natasha, Natalia Kraevskaia, and under the supervision of an official advisor to the project, Dr. Nora Taylor.

The original version of the Salon Natasha archive contains 8 300 documents; 4 992 of them are displayed online. The documents encompass the years before the opening of Salon Natasha (1980s), the main period of its exhibition activities (1990-2005), its collections, social connections and media coverage. The Salon Natasha archive contains exhibition invitations and catalogues, artists’ CVs and statements, project concept descriptions and correspondence between curators and artists, press and media reviews as well as digitalized images of actual artworks exhibited or collected by Salon Natasha, photographs of exhibition openings or project progress development, snapshots of the physical space of Salon Natasha and its artists and friends. The materials are accompanied by detailed metadata which helps to create links between the records and provides historical contextualization.

The Salon Natasha Archive not only features an alternative art space in Vietnam, it also traces the different pathways to contemporary art undertaken by Vietnamese artists since the onset of Doi Moi. While Salon Natasha may have had its unique qualities and innovative spirit, it is also a reflection of the artistic environment in Hanoi both before and after Doi Moi.
