= Wong Wai Yin =

Hong Kong artist (born 1981)

- 黃慧妍
- Born: British Hong Kong
- Other name: Doris Wong Wai Yin
- Education: Master of Fine Arts
- Alma mater: Chinese University of Hong Kong; University of Leeds
- Occupation: Visual Artist
- Spouse: Kwan Sheung-chi

Wong Wai Yin , also known as Doris Wong Wai Yin, is an interdisciplinary artist based in Hong Kong. Her practice incorporates a range of media, including painting, sculpture, collage, installations, video, performance, and photography. Her work is based on autobiographical experience, episodic memory, and interventions in art history.

== Background ==
Wong Wai Yin was born in British Hong Kong. She received her Bachelor of Fine Arts from the Chinese University of Hong Kong in 2004 and earned a Master of Fine Arts from the University of Leeds in the United Kingdom in 2005.

In 2009, while working as a project assistant at Asia Art Archive (AAA), she contributed to the research and documentation initiative Materials of the Future: Documenting Contemporary Chinese Art from 1980–1990. She returned to AAA as an artist-in-residence from 2010 to 2011.

Wong is also the founder of the Observation Society, an independent art space in Guangzhou. She currently teaches part-time at the City University of Hong Kong and the Hong Kong University of Science and Technology, and joined the Department of Fine Arts at the Chinese University of Hong Kong in 2012.

== Work ==
Wong's 2008 black-and-white video titled Tribute to Inside Looking Out – For the male artists along my way, (2 min. 24 sec., single-channel digital video, sound) is on display at M+. The work was her response to encounters with gender-based discrimination in Beijing.

Wong has exhibited her work in Hong Kong, Japan, the United States, Singapore, and Guangzhou.

== Personal life ==
Wong currently lives and works in Hong Kong. She is married to artist Kwan Sheung-chi, with whom she has a son.

== Exhibitions ==
=== Selected solo exhibitions ===
- 2009. "L'Écume des choses" – l'art de Wong Wai Yin, Observation Society, Guangzhou, China
- 2010. "Woofer Café Ten", Woofer Ten, Hong Kong
- 2011. "Becoming a Different Person Might be Hard" – A Painting Exhibition of Wong Wai Yin, iPRECIATION, Hong Kong
- 2011. "From Wong Wai Yin's Collection to the Hong Kong Art Archive", Asia Art Archive, Hong Kong
- 2016. "Without Trying", Spring Workshop, Hong Kong

=== Selected group exhibitions ===
- 2002. "Cho Siu-yee and Wong Wai-yin Joint Exhibition", The Chinese University of Hong Kong, Hong Kong
- 2003. "Fotanian", Yiliu Painting Factory, Fotanian Artists Studios, Hong Kong
- 2003. "Hong Kong Art Biennial Exhibition 2003", Hong Kong Museum of Art, Hong Kong
- 2003. "Just Do It" Sharon Lam, Doris To and Wong Wai-yin Joint Exhibition, The Chinese University of Hong Kong, Hong Kong
- 2004. "Build: HK Spirit Red White Blue", Hong Kong Heritage Museum, Hong Kong
- 2004. "CUHK Fine Art Graduation Show", The Chinese University of Hong Kong, Hong Kong
- 2004. "Sculpture non Sculpture", 1a space, Hong Kong
- 2005. "Hong Kong Art Biennial Exhibition 2005", Hong Kong Museum of Art, Hong Kong
- 2005. "Art SuperMart@Para/Site", Para/Site Art Space, Hong Kong
- 2005. "Studio Visit", Bankley House Studios, Manchester, UK
- 2005. "Meeting Point" MA Fine Art Graduation Show, University of Leeds, Leeds, UK
- 2006. "Dream a little dream", Basement, Hollywood Centre, Hong Kong
- 2006. "aWay" Group Exhibition of Contemporary Visual Artists, 1a space, Hong Kong
- 2007. "Vending Art Machine" Made in Hong Kong, Hong Kong Museum of Art, Hong Kong
- 2007. "Copied Right", Para/Site Art Space, Hong Kong
- 2007. "Time After Time", Basement, Hollywood Centre, Hong Kong
- 2007. "97+10" Reversing Horizons, Artist Reflections of the Hong Kong Handover 10th Anniversary, MoCA Shanghai, Shanghai, China
- 2007. "Exhibitions On – Fire!", Para/Site Central, Hong Kong
- 2007. "Variances in Singular", Too Art, Hong Kong Arts Centre, Hong Kong
- 2007. "Fotanian: Open Studio 2007", =(o-otter studio, Fotanian Artists Studios, Hong Kong
- 2008. "Wanakio 2008", Okinawa, Japan
- 2008. "Reversed Reality", Worksound, Portland, USA
- 2008. "The 3rd Guangzhou Triennial", Guangdong Museum of Art, Guangzhou, China
- 2008. "Inside Looking Out", Osage Gallery, Singapore
- 2008. "Women's Work", Osage Gallery, Kwun Tong, Hong Kong
- 2008. "Sick Leaves" Conceptual Art Exhibition, C&G Artpartment, Hong Kong
- 2008. "Shek Kip Mei / World: Public Housing 20/20", MOST, Jockey Club Creative Arts Centre, Hong Kong
- 2008. "Hong Kong Anarchitecture Bananas: Artists who reclaim space", Artist Commune, Hong Kong
- 2008. "Fair Enough", Blue Lotus Gallery, Hong Kong
- 2008. "Sun of Beach", Wong Wai Wheel Artspace, Hong Kong
- 2008. "Fotanian: Fotan Artists Open Studios 2008", =(o-otter studio, Fotanian Artists Studios, Hong Kong
- 2009. "ISCP Open Studio", ISCP, New York, USA
- 2009. "One Degree of Separation", Chinese Arts Centre, Manchester, UK
- 2009. "Louis Vuitton: A Passion for Creation", Hong Kong Museum of Art, Hong Kong
- 2009. "Muse", Louis Vuitton Gallery, Hong Kong
- 2009. "Some Rooms", Osage Gallery, Kwun Tong, Hong Kong
- 2009. "Charming Experience", Hong Kong Museum of Art, Hong Kong
- 2009. "Reality Revisited", OC Gallery, Hong Kong
- 2010. "Siu Sai Gual Bananale", Woofer Ten, Hong Kong
- 2010. "Taipei Biennial 2010", Taipei Fine Arts Museum, Taipei, Taiwan
- 2010. "Everything Goes Wrong for the Poor Couple", ART HK 10, Hong Kong
- 2010. "Go: The First OCAT Youth Exhibition", OCT Contemporary Art Terminal, Shenzhen, China
- 2010. "A Guide to Job Loss", Inheritance Projects, Shenzhen, China
- 2010. "FAX", Para/Site Art Space, Hong Kong
- 2011. "Primitive Craftsmanship – Contemporary Mechanism", Artist Commune, Hong Kong
- 2011. "Except why not just come right out and say it:", Collectors House, Heerlen, The Netherlands
- 2012. "Mobile M+: Yau Ma Tei", Yau Ma Tei, Hong Kong
- 2012. "Why Do Trees Grow Till the End?", SOUTHSITE, Hong Kong
- 2012. "Wearable Exhibition: Bring Art Everywhere", Fotan, Hong Kong
- 2013. "But is it Art?", "I know but I don't know.", Gallery EXIT, Hong Kong
- 2013. "The Imperfect Circle", Osage Gallery, Kwun Tong, Hong Kong
- 2013. "Hong Kong Eye", ArtisTree, Hong Kong
- 2014. "Man's Future Fund", Discover Asia, Art Fair Tokyo, Japan

== Curated projects ==
- 2008. "Sun of Beach", Wong Wai Wheel Artspace, Hong Kong
- 2010. "Kanyu Weiti Fengshui Weiyong Sculpture Installation", Woofer Ten, Hong Kong
- 2011. "Love and Community", Woofer Ten, Hong Kong

== Awards ==
- 2003. "Hui's Fine Arts Award", The Art of CUHK 2003, The Chinese University of Hong Kong, Hong Kong
- 2003. "Cheung's Fine Arts Award", The Art of CUHK 2003, The Chinese University of Hong Kong, Hong Kong
- 2004. "The British Chevening Scholarship", Hong Kong Arts Development Council, Hong Kong
- 2009. "ADC and ACC Artist-in-Residence Fellowship", Hong Kong Arts Development Council and Asian Cultural Council, Hong Kong

== Artist-in-residence ==
- 2008. "Wanakio 2008", Okinawa, Japan
- 2008. Worksound, Portland, USA
- 2009–2010. ISCP, New York, USA
- 2011. "From Wong Wai Yin's Collection to the Hong Kong Art Archive", Asia Art Archive, Hong Kong

== Collections ==
=== Private collections ===
- Hong Kong Museum of Art
- Hong Kong Kadist Art Foundation, Paris/San Francisco
- M+, Hong Kong

== Publications ==
- The Ten Seconds Preceding the Decision that A Can Be Made Into A Work (2016)
- Without Trying (2016)
- A place never seen is not a place (2017)
- Everyone's Fine (2021)
