= Chua Beng Huat =

Singaporean sociologist

Academic work
- Discipline: Sociology
- Sub-discipline: comparative politics, Asian culture

Chua Beng Huat
- Traditional Chinese: 蔡明發
- Simplified Chinese: 蔡明发
- Hokkien POJ: Chhòa Bêng-hoat
Transcriptions
Standard Mandarin
- Hanyu Pinyin: Cài Míngfā
Southern Min
- Hokkien POJ: Chhòa Bêng-hoat

Chua Beng Huat (simplified Chinese: 蔡明发; traditional Chinese: 蔡明發; Pe̍h-ōe-jī: Chhòa Bêng-hoat) is a Singaporean sociologist. He is currently Professor Emeritus in the Department of Sociology, Faculty of Arts and Social Science at the National University of Singapore, and concurrently serving as a faculty member (Social Science [Urban Studies]) at the Yale-NUS College. "He has previously served as Provost Chair Professor, Faculty of Arts and Social Science (2009-2017), Research Leader, Cultural Studies in Asia Research Cluster, Asia Research Institute (2000-2015); Convenor Cultural Studies Programmes (2008-2013) and Head, the Department of Sociology (2009-2015), National University of Singapore".

Chua studied Biology and Chemistry in his undergraduate years. His involvement with student political activities made him realize that he did not have the right personality for natural science. He headed to York University, Toronto, to take up Environmental Studies in 1970. A year later, he switched to Sociology and received a M.A and a PhD.

== Early works ==
Chua's PhD dissertation used the Preliminary Report of the Canadian Royal Commission on Bilingualism and Biculturalism to analyze how government reports are written such that they are demonstrably democratic. It was a phenomenological, ethnomethodological and interpretive piece that exposed mechanisms by which democracy is made visible in texts. Commenting on his dissertation, Chau explained that "one of the interesting things I think most people don't realize is that those kinds of ethnomethodological work can actually be used for social change. Knowing how reality is put together is to know, at the same time, how it can be deconstructed. If you know how reality is constructed, then you know how it can be changed."

Shortly after his graduate studies, Chua taught at Trent University, Ontario for about seven or eight years. In 1984, the Housing and Development Board (HDB) offered him the Director of Research post. He returned to Singapore and took up the position. He began to stray away from wholly theoretical work and focused on writing critically about Singapore as well, including writing a weekly column in the national newspaper, The Straits Times, for one year. As he explained, "Once I came back to Singapore, to a certain extent, what happens locally politically gets personalized. I feel not just the responsibility but also the right to be critically analytical of a society to which my own life is embedded. In that sense, I kind of changed from being an academic to a more public intellectual; in Canada, I was basically an academic whose concerns are of conceptual and theoretical questions of how to do sociology."

He was fired from his job at HDB for his critical writings of Singapore politics. He joined NUS afterward, and has been there since 1985.

== Current research interests ==
His research efforts are focused on three key areas: comparative politics in Southeast Asia, urban and housing planning, and Cultural Studies in Asia.

One noteworthy work in the area of comparative politics in Southeast Asia is his discussion of communitarian politics. He asserts that liberalism and democracy do not necessarily have to go hand in hand in Asia. With nationhood being a new phenomenon and liberalism lacking deep historical roots in much of Asia, he questioned what other values instead of those of liberalism might be promoted in these regions, and analyzed dynamics that surround construing national ideologies in communitarian terms. In this way, he revealed how social practices in parts of Asia disrupt the global hegemony of liberalism. In Communitarian Ideology and Democracy in Singapore for instance, a book that radically reoriented the analysis of politics in Singapore, he demonstrated that the undisrupted reign of People's Action Party (PAP) was based on its ability to develop and maintain a Gramscian sense of ideological hegemony, since the mid-1970s, rather than on authoritarianism. This ideological hegemony had enabled the Party to shift towards the concept of 'Asian democracy', an attempt to supplant liberalism with 'Asian' communitarism.

In the area of urban and housing planning, Chua has made inquiries into the uniqueness of public housing in Singapore, with it being neither an investment and consumer good in a free market, nor a social right as in socialist nations. In Political legitimacy and Housing: Stakeholding in Singapore for example, he shows that the success of its unique public housing system, which guarantees a home for all citizens, is a fundamental contribution to the ideological hegemony and thus legitimacy of the one-party state in Singapore.

By the mid-1990s, as the capitalist economies in East Asia developed, Chua turned his attention to popular consumer culture. This resulted firstly in editing, Consumption in Asia: lifestyles and identities, a volume in the Routledge New Rich in Asia Series. This was followed by the attention-grabbing neon pink book Life is Not Complete without Shopping. Playfully drawing its title from a 1996 National Day Rally speech by the then Prime Minister of Singapore Goh Chok Tong, this book explored how Singapore's social reality is constituted in an environment steeped in global consumer imagery. In it, he wrote about bodies, food, clothes and movies, diverse activities like hanging out at the town centre McDonald's, riding the escalator at Ngee Ann City, a major shopping complex, and looking at price tags at Prada came together as analytical objects.

By the late 1990s, Chua became increasingly interested in Cultural Studies. He became a founding Co-Executive Editor of the journal Inter-Asia Cultural Studies. With financial support from the Asia Research Institute at National University of Singapore, where he leads the Cultural Studies in Asia Research Cluster, he organized conferences and workshops in related topics and themes. Edited volumes, such as Political Elections as Popular Culture and East Asian Pop Culture: analyzing the Korean Wave, are results of these workshops. With these organizing and publication efforts, he has helped to develop a research community of scholars who are engaged in analyzing Asian pop music, film and television dramas.

== Other interests ==
Chua is an avid supporter of the arts. He was the Artistic Director of a multi-disciplinary group show SENI in 2004, and served on the Board of Directors for FOCAS, a now-defunct not-for-profit publishing initiative that primarily concerned itself with contemporary art, politics and social change in Singapore and Southeast Asia. Presently, he is on the International Advisory Board for the Asian Film Archive (AFA) and Chairman of the Board of Trustees of Temenggong Artists-In-Residence, a centre for artistic exchange and residence in Singapore.

== Major publications ==
Books
2024
Public Subsidy, Private Accumulation: The Political Economy of Singapore's Public Housing, NUS Press.
2017
Liberalism Disavowed: Communitarianism and State Capitalism in Singapore, NUS Press.
2012
Structure, Audience and Soft Power in East Asian Pop Culture, Hong Kong University Press.
2003
Life is Not Complete without Shopping, Singapore: Singapore University Press.
1997
Political Legitimacy and Housing: Stakeholding in Singapore, London and New York: Routledge.
1995
Communitarian Ideology and Democracy in Singapore, London and New York: Routledge.

Edited volumes
2008
(with Arndt Graf) Port Cities in Asia and Europe, London: Routledge.
(with Koichi Iwabuchi) East Asian Pop Culture: Analyzing the Korean Wave, Hong Kong: Hong Kong University Press.
2007
(with Kuan-Hsing Chen) The Inter-Asia Cultural Studies Reader, London: Routledge.
Elections as Popular Culture in Asia, New York and London: Routledge.
2004
Communitarian Politics in Asia, London and New York: RoutledgeCurzon.
2000
Consumption in Asia: Lifestyles and Identities, London and New York: Routledge.
1999
Singapore Studies II: Critical Survey of the Humanities and Social Sciences, Singapore: Singapore University Press.
