= Bui Huu Hung =

Vietnamese artist

- Born: 4 June 1957 (age 68); Hanoi, Vietnam
- Education: Vietname University of Fine Arts (formally École des Beaux-arts de l'Indochine)
- Movement: Post-Đổi Mới & Contemporary Art
- Website: www.bui-huuhung.com

Bui Huu Hung (born 1957) is a Vietnamese artist, internationally recognised for his mastery of native lacquer painting. His work spans abstract, figurative, and landscape painting, with exhibitions across Asia, Europe, and the United States. His artworks are included in significant public, royal, and private collections around the world.

== Early life and education ==
Born in Hanoi, Vietnam, Bui Huu Hung began studying lacquer techniques at the age of 18, travelling to rural villages to learn directly from artisans who preserved the medium’s ancient methods. Following military service in 1978, he enrolled at the National Fine Arts University (formerly École des Beaux-arts de l'Indochine), where he further trained in fine arts. He became a member of the Vietnam Artists Association in 1986 and joined the International Lacquer Artists Association in 1996.

== Career ==
=== Early period ===
Bui Huu Hung is an artist who bears witness to the transitional period of the 1990s. His early works from the 1970s and 1980s were small-scale abstract lacquer paintings, some of which were exhibited at venues such as Salon Natasha in Hanoi.

In the 1990s, he began producing his first portrait series, which later became a hallmark of his work. These portraits often depicted figures dressed in traditional attire and were executed on a larger scale than his earlier abstracts. Alongside portraiture, he also created still lifes and landscapes, frequently featuring rural scenes with bamboo groves, mountains, and rivers.

=== International recognition ===
Unusually for a Vietnamese artist of his generation, Bui Huu Hung’s work gained international exposure prior to Vietnam’s economic opening during the Đổi Mới period. In 1982, his lacquer landscapes were exhibited in Warsaw, Poland, and in 1983 his still lifes were shown in Sofia, Bulgaria. In 1993, he participated in the group exhibition Art Springg at the Alliance Française in Hanoi. The following year, he co-founded the Avant-Garde Group with artists Trương Tân, Lê Hồng Thái, and Đỗ Minh Tâm. Their inaugural exhibition, supported by the German Socialist Cultural Mission, became a landmark event, reflecting Vietnam’s emerging contemporary art scene.

In 1996, Hùng took part in the International Lacquer Exhibition at the Fujita Museum in Tokyo, marking his induction into the World Lacquer Artists Association alongside Lê Hồng Thái. In 1997, he represented modern and Đổi Mới-era Vietnamese artists at the Sacred Seasons exhibition at the Four Seasons Hotel Gallery in Singapore, sponsored by Notices Gallery, presenting works by master artists including Nguyễn Tư Nghiêm, Nguyễn Chung, and pre-1945 southern Vietnamese artists.

Hùng held his first solo exhibition in 1995 at the Australian Cultural Center in Hanoi. Since then, he has presented numerous solo exhibitions internationally, including in London, Hong Kong, Miami, Paris, Singapore, and Dubai.

=== Cultural diplomacy ===
Bui Huu Hung is also known for his contributions to cultural diplomacy, with numerous artworks presented as government gifts to state leaders and used in official exchanges. His large-scale court portraits and landscapes adorn the walls of parliamentary buildings in Vietnam and embassies around the world.

=== Bui Huu Hung Foundation ===
In 2023, the Bui Huu Hung Foundation was established to promote and preserve Vietnamese lacquer. The Foundation undertakes the collection, exhibition, preservation, and study of artworks and archival materials related to Vietnamese lacquer. Its activities include research in art history, public education initiatives, the provision of facilities for artists, and support for both established and emerging practitioners.

== Abstract series ==
In the late 2010s, Bui Huu Hung revisited abstraction, exploring techniques he had experimented with earlier, such as lacquer on canvas. This approach, previously seen in his Socialist Realist work Unquiet Sea (1978), reappeared in later series such as Immortal Lineage, created in his ephemeral research studio in Marly-le-Roi, France, in 2014.

Affirming his view of lacquer as a mixed-media art form, he began producing large-scale works that incorporated fabric, found objects, antiques, cement, and soil. From this period, he developed series including The Doors, The First Exercises of the Lacquer Painting Curriculum, Story of the Mother Goddess of the Highlands, and Red Alluvium.
