= Chen Kuan-hsing =

Chen Kuan-Hsing
- 陳光興
- Citizenship: Republic of China
- Occupations: Professor, National Chiao Tung University

Academic background
- Education: University of Iowa, Fu Jen University

Chen Kuan-hsing
- Traditional Chinese: 陳光興
Transcriptions
Standard Mandarin
- Hanyu Pinyin: Chén Guāngxīng

Chen Kuan-Hsing is a Taiwanese intellectual who works in the field of inter-Asian cultural studies. He is one of the editors-in-chief of the journal Inter-Asia Cultural Studies. He is the author of Asia as Method: Toward Deimperialization (Duke University Press, 2010) and numerous other publications.

His approach to cultural studies has been described as one of calling 'for using 'Asia as method' ... the basic idea being to multiply points of reference within Asia so as to de-emphasize, if not necessarily abandon, the orthodox preoccupations of the west'.
