= Luke Ching Chin Wai =

Hong Kong conceptual artist & labour activist (born 1972)

- 程展緯
- Born: 1972 (age 53–54); Hong Kong
- Education: Chinese University of Hong Kong (BFA, MFA}

Luke Ching Chin Wai (程展緯; born 1972) is a conceptual artist and labour activist from Hong Kong. His artistic practice twists the roles of artist and observer and mixes humour with cultural and political collisions in Hong Kong. He studied at the Chinese University of Hong Kong and graduated with an MA in Fine Art in 1998.

== Artistic practice ==
Ching's works range from photography to sculpture to video, often social intervention made as a spontaneous response to his surroundings. His artistic practices are based upon his belief in agency and social responsibility of artists.

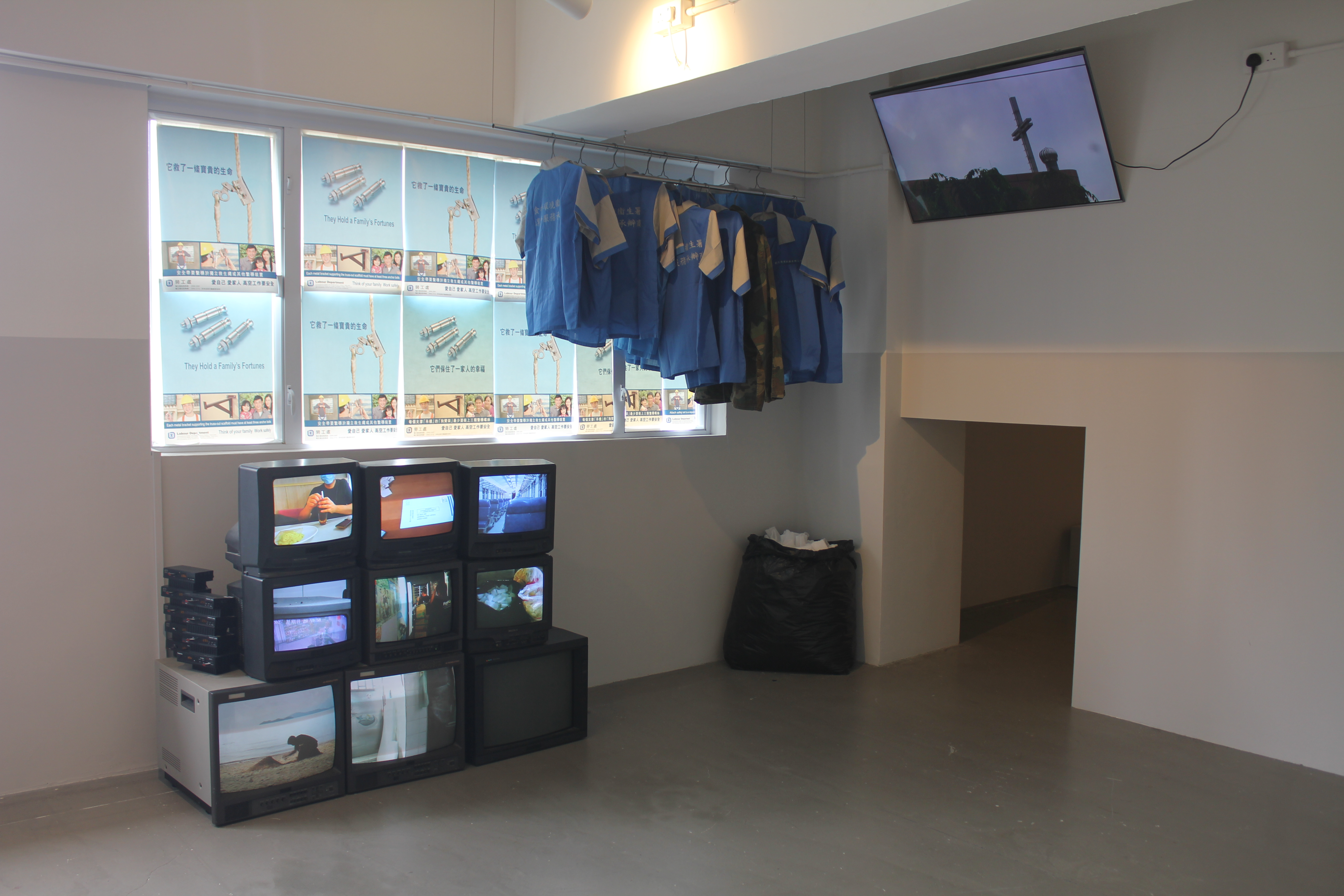
Glitch in the Matrix exhibition at Para Site in 2021

Since 2007 in his ongoing project undercover worker, he has worked in low-paid jobs in Hong Kong to experience first-hand their working environments and conditions. He uses these projects to visualize hidden problems within Hong Kong, connect different situations and lead campaigns to improve working conditions of low-paid workers. Some of these campaigns have been successful, such as providing chairs for security guards and cashiers, providing a new design for public rubbish bins to make cleaners' jobs easier, and urging the city’s Labour Department to improve health & safety standards related to prolonged standing. His work has launched collaborative activities to encourage employers make positive changes and raise awareness of workers' welfare.

He also uses pinhole photography, installations and video works to document the rapid changes to Hong Kong and other cities. In 2017 he turned a hotel room at the Titanic Hotel in Liverpool into a pinhole camera for the Look Liverpool International Photography Festival.

His works Pokfulam Village: View (Positive) (1999), Screensaver (2014), 1823: Complex Pile (2014), and Pixel (2014) are collected by M+.

== Art residencies ==
- 2008 plAAy, Blackburn Museum and Art Gallery
- 2012 Breath, Chinese Arts Centre
- 2020 Helsinki International Artist Programme

== Awards ==
- 2005 Hong Kong Art Biennial Photography Prize of Excellence
- 2016 Hong Kong Arts Development Council Visual Artist of the Year
- 2019 Visible Award shortlist for Undercover Worker
