= Mali Wu =

Taiwanese contemporary artist (b. 1957)

- 吳瑪悧
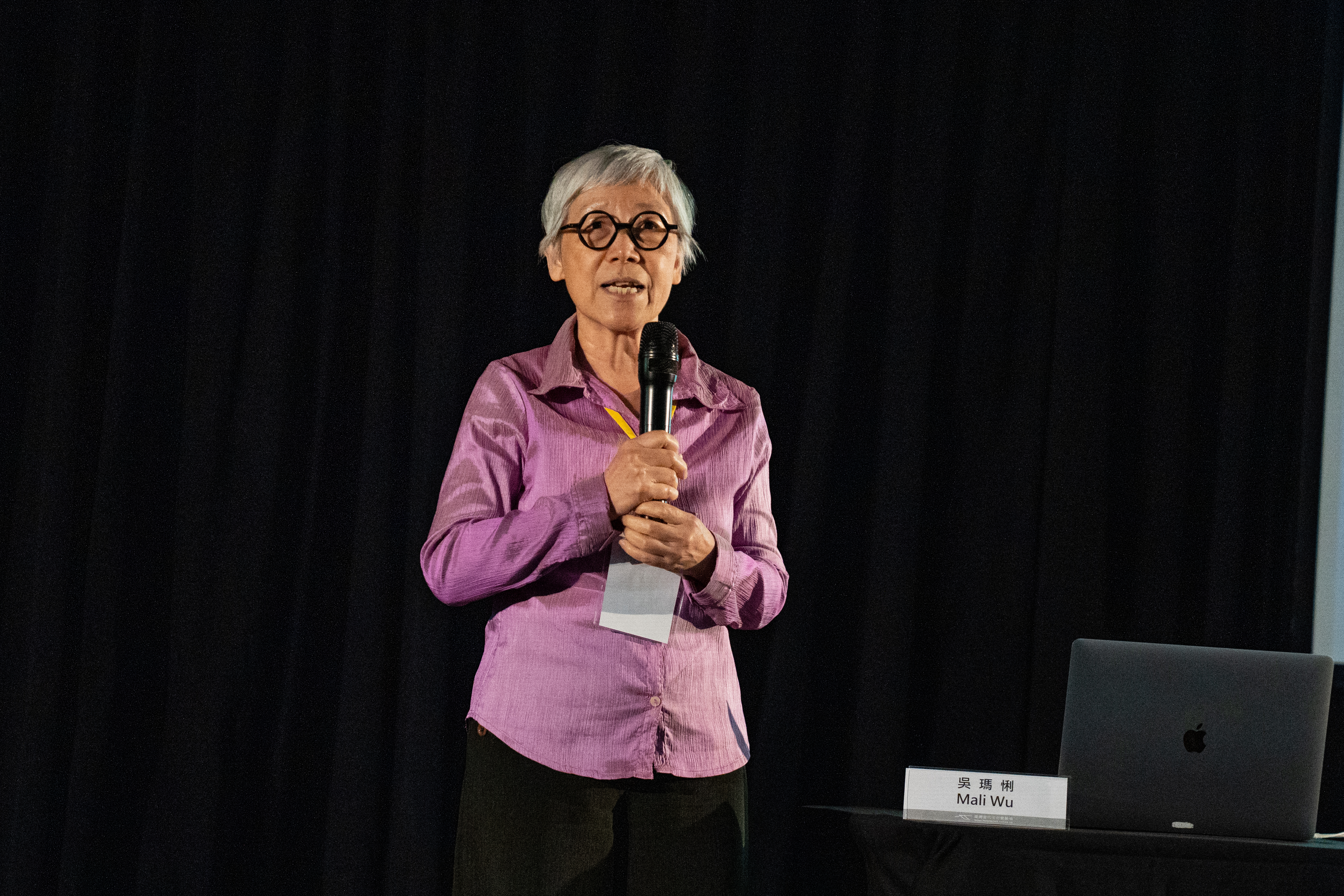
- Born: 1957; Taipei, Taiwan
- Education: Tamkang University; University of Applied Arts Vienna
- Movement: Social practice (art); Relational aesthetics

ce

Mali Wu (Chinese: 吳瑪悧; born 1957) is a Taiwanese artist, writer, and activist working with social practice and conceptual art. She has been described as the "'godmother' of Taiwan's socially engaged art" by artist and art writer Zheng Bo.

== Biography ==
=== Early career ===
Wu completed her undergraduate degree in German language and literature at Tamkang University in 1979. She enrolled at the School of Applied Arts in Vienna, Austria in 1980, but transferred to the Kunstakademie Düsseldorf in Germany, where she studied sculpture under Günther Uecker and Klaus Rinke from 1982 to 1986. After graduating, Wu returned to Taiwan, where the lifting of martial law triggered significant socio-political and economic changes. As society swiftly shifted focus, she took a strong interest in the emerging social, political and historical hierarchies.

=== 1995-1999 ===
In 1995, Wu took part in a group exhibition Balanceakte in the Ifa-Galerie Bonn of the Instituts für Auslandsbeziehungen. In the same year she represented Taiwan at the 46th Venice Biennale (Palazzo delle Prigioni) with the installation Library (1995). In this work, she shredded Chinese and Western literary classics and then placed the shredded material into acrylic boxes labeled with the original book title.

In 1997 she presented the exhibition Segmentation/Multiplication: Three Taiwanese Artists, with Marvin Minto FANG (范姜明道), TSONG Pu(莊普). After interviewing female textile workers, Wu was inspired to create Stories of Women from Hsinchuang (1997), where she wove the textile workers stories into a piece of cloth and installed it on a wall, hoping to reflect "how these women narrated their own lives." Also in 1997, Wu made Epitaph, a commemoration of the 50th anniversary of the 228 incident.

In 1998 she was represented in the Bonn Women's Museum in the exhibition Half the sky with the video work Stories of Women from Hsinchuang. Also in 1998, Wu created Formosa Club, inspired by both the debates on licensed prostitution in Taiwan and the broader question of the relationship between women and the economy. It was exhibited in the Taipei Fine Arts Museum for the 1998 Taipei Biennial. Another notable work from this period is Birds Slide over the Sky (1998) which is about the displacement of Taiwanese men after World War II. One element of the work is a photograph of a now non-existent village Kuomintang which relied on the military. A small mirror was placed opposite to the photograph, on it were the stories of different men.

From 1998 to 1999 Wu's work was displayed at MoMA PS1 as a part of the exhibition Inside Out: New Chinese Art.

=== 2000-Present ===
Since the 1990s she has produced a series of projects and criticized the state of social and political affairs from a feminist perspective in her works. Parallel to her practice, she led the translation of two important texts, Suzanne Lacy's Mapping the Terrain: New Genre Public Art and Grant Kester's Conversation Pieces: Community and Communication in Modern Art, into Chinese.

From 2000 to 2004, Wu worked with the Taipei Awakening Association (TAA). After understanding the impact that the Awakening from Your Skin series had on a group of female textile workers, Wu decided to transform her practice into being more socially engaged. Additionally it was also her project, Bed Sheets of Soul (2001), that also pivoted her practice into becoming more socially engaged. In 2000 she invited by women's movements groups in Taipei to start working on this new project. What she created invited participants to reflect on their lives through making bedsheets. In her reflection “ Wu states that “the participants saw their values in a new light”.

In 2006 she worked with the Cultural Affairs Bureau in Chiayi County to organize Art as Environment- A Cultural Action along the Tropic of Cancer. For this project she brought together 17 artists in 10 remote villages. This project directly and indirectly led to more artists become community-based, which has also been a policy adopted by different levels of government. Also in 2006 she launched By the River, on the River, of the River – A Community Based Eco-Art Project (2006); Restore Our Rivers and Mountains – Along the Keelung River, a collaboration with a community college attempting to stimulate discussion about rivers and current environmental issues. Wu has consistently dealt with ecological issues by adopting art as an approach to bridge culture and nature, demonstrating the potential for contemporary art and the vital personal energy of an artist.

In 2007, she organized a conference "Art and Public Sphere: Working in Community"—and later edited a volume of the same title—to unite local practitioners, theorists, and officials. She is also an art teacher, and heads the Graduate Institute of Interdisciplinary Art at National Kaohsiung Normal University in Kaohsiung. In 2014 she curated a large exhibition titled Art as Social Interaction, showcasing socially engaged projects of 30 artists and groups from Taiwan and Hong Kong. She is also active in building regional networks.

In 2011 Wu started one of her most well-known projects Art as Environment- A Cultural Action at the Plum Tree Creek, which focused on restoring the Plum Tree Creek in Zhuwei area of New Taipei. The project included everything from community mobilization, school programs, dance and theater events. Wu was described as both the lead artist and curator.

In 2018 she was an artist in residence at NTU Centre for Contemporary Art Singapore and co-curator of the 11th Taipei Biennial with Francesco Manacorda. The Biennial was focused on environmental issues, showing how socio ecological concerns have become a focus of Taiwan, especially in response to the referendum of November 24. Wu and Manacorda curated a multi-media exhibition featuring works such as Zheng Bo’s “Pteridophilia” and Julian Charrière’s An Invitation to Disappear. Both works touched on her socioecological theme.

In September 2022, Wu worked on "Food First - an art based research project" as part of the Bellagio Residency for the Rockefeller Foundation.

== Awards ==
Art as Environment—A Cultural Action at the Plum Tree Creek (jointly produced with Bamboo Curtain Studio) won the Taishin Arts Award in 2013, the most prestigious art prize in Taiwan.

In 2016 Wu won the 19th National Award of Art.

== Literature ==
- Alvau, Roberto Riccardo. "Labor, Marginalization, Taiwanization: Mapping the Embodiment of the Being-Woman in Post-Martial Taiwan Through Wu Mali’s Stories of Women from Hsin-Chuang". In: Embodied Entanglements: Gender, Identity, and the Corporeal in Asia. Eds. Halina Zawiszová, Giorgio Strafella, Martin Lavička, Vol. 3, (2025): 437–457. ISBN 978-80-244-6582-1. doi:10.5507/ff.25.24465821.
- Alvau, Roberto Riccardo. "(De)Centering Towards Where? Exploring Ecofeminist Infiltration And Wu Mali’s Influence On Institutional Dynamics In Taiwanese Contemporary Art”. In Espacios de Arte y Género. Colección Àgora Feminista. Eds. Marta Alonso Castanedo, Vol. 4, (2023): 155–170. ISBN 978-84-19647-73-3.
- Katy Deepwell: Mali Wu. A Profile. In: n.paradoxa. International Feminist Art Journal. Ed. Katy Deepwell, Vol. 5, November 1997, ISSN 1461-0434, S. 45–53. (English)
- Wu, Mali (2015-01-02). "Who's listening to whose story?". World Art. 5 (1): 187–197. doi:10.1080/21500894.2015.1070744. ISSN 2150-0894. S2CID 193281199.
- Tung Wei Hsiu "When Social Practice Art Overcomes Globalisation: Attending to Environment and Locality in Taiwan" Culture and Dialogue 6, (2018) 223–250.
