= Cedric Maridet =

French artist based in Hong Kong

Cedric Maridet is a French artist based in Hong Kong. He received a PhD in Media Art in 2009 at the School of Creative Media, City University of Hong Kong. In 2005 He was awarded the Prize of Excellence at the Hong Kong Art Biennial.
