= Magdalen Wong =

Magdalen Wong (Chinese: 黃頌恩; pinyin: Huang Songen; born 1981) is a Hong Kong / New York based artist. She typically works across the mediums of video, photography, sculpture, installation and drawing.

== Life and work ==
Magdalen Wong was born in Hong Kong but moved to the USA at age 13 and then moved back to Hong Kong in 2006. She completed her undergraduate degree at the Maryland Institute College of Art in 2003 and a master's degree at the School of the Art Institute of Chicago in 2005.

Wong has described her practice as dealing with "mundane objects and sensual imageries" (timeoutHK). Wong takes inspiration for her work from elements in her everyday life, these include Japanese animation, toy stores, bakeries, wet markets and Sham Shui Po.

Wong is interested in altering mundane objects—through various mediums such as photography, video and sculpture—to provoke viewers to seek different narratives and the unique beauty within these everyday artifacts. Although her work can sometimes be viewed as a critique of consumer culture, she states that the intention of her work is to provoke "a mystery in the ordinary".

Notable works include the video installation mmm wow (2012) in which Wong edited together different expressions from Hong Kong television commercials, for example "mmm", "ohhh" and "wow". The looped video works are displayed on TV sets installed with propped up the screens facing the ground. Viewers could hear the sounds from the TVs, but as the screens faced the ground, they could only see modulating colors reflected on the floor as the videos looped. In the photographic series Peeled (2010) a watermelon's green rind is peeled to reveal the pink tissue below. The photographs capture a performative gesture which transforms the mundane object of the watermelon into something strange. For Splash (2010), another photographic series, the artist collage cut-out milk splashes from cereal boxes.

Wong is part of the United States-based art group i.e. artist group. The group is made up of seven members, including Wong.They create and curate international exhibitions and events.

Wong currently taught at the Academy of Visual Arts, Hong Kong Baptist University, from 2006 to 2011.

She shows with OV Gallery.

== Awards and recognition ==
- 2014: Skowhegan School of Painting and Sculpture, Main, USA
- 2012: Project Exhibition Grant, Hong Kong Arts Development Council, Hong Kong
- 2005: Hayward Prize, The American Austrian Foundation, Salzburg Summer Academy, Salzburg, Austria

== Selected solo exhibitions ==
- 2011: Sunrise Sunset, Corner Gallery, Seoul, South Korea
- 2011: Shift, Goethe Institute, Hong Kong
- 2013: A Flight of Fancy, Osage Open Gallery, Hong Kong

== Selected group exhibitions ==
- 2006: Asian Traffic: line-feed, Hong Kong Visual Art Centre, Hong Kong
- 2007: 97+10: Hand Baggage, Videotage, MOCA, Shanghai
- 2008: What are you doing where?, Para/site Art Space at Hong Kong-Shenzhen Biennale of Urbanism/Architecture, Hong Kong
- 2008: Domestic Affairs, Galleri 21, Malmo, Sweden
- 2009: cheapart gallery, Art-Athina: International Contemporary Art Fair of Athens, Greece
- 2010: Double Happiness: A Story of Siamese Cities, Studio Double Happiness and OV Gallery, Hong Kong
- 2011: i can't go on, i must go on, Tempus Projects, Tampa, FL, USA
- 2011: Closer & Closing, The National Art Studio, Goyang, Seoul, South Korea
- 2012: NO LONGER HUMAN, Osage Kwun Tong, Hong Kong
- 2012: Why Do Trees Grow Till the End?, Southsite, Gallery Exit, Hong Kong
- 2012: hi • a • tus, Urban Institute of Contemporary Arts, Grand Rapids, MI, USA
- 2012: Traits, Ox Warehouse, Macau
- 2013: Follies of Species, OV Gallery, Shanghai, China
- 2013: Fresh 10, Outlet Gallery, Brooklyn, NY
- 2014: The Heroic Object, Parallel Art Space, Brooklyn, NY
- 2014: The Part in the Story Where a Part Becomes a Part of Something Else, Witte de With, Rotterdam, The Netherlands
- 2015: DAYS PUSH OFF INTO NIGHT, Spring Workshop, Hong Kong
