= Jun Nguyen-Hatsushiba =

Japanese-Vietnamese visual artist

Jun Nguyen-Hatsushiba (born 1968), is a Japanese-Vietnamese visual artist. He works in drawing, and video art. He grew up in Japan and currently lives in Ho Chi Minh City, Vietnam.

== Biography ==
Jun Nguyen-Hatsushiba was born in 1968 in Tokyo to a Japanese mother and a Vietnamese father. In 1968, the year he was born was the same year of the Tet Offensive staged by the Viet Cong and North Vietnamese troops. He spent his childhood in Japan.

He earned B.F.A. degree (1992) from the School of the Art Institute of Chicago (SAIC), and an M.F.A. degree (1994) from the Maryland Institute College of Art (MICA).

He has had solo exhibitions at the Mori Art Museum, Tokyo, the Museo d'Arte Contemporanea, Rome, Kunsthalle Wien, Austria, Smithsonian Freer Gallery of Art / Arthur M. Sackler Gallery and a retrospective of his work was shown at the Manchester Art Gallery in England. His work has been included in numerous biennials, including the Shanghai Biennale, the Venice Biennale, the Istanbul Biennial, and the São Paulo Biennale.

Nguyen-Hatsushiba's films explore Vietnamese history and national identity, and have referenced issues such as the displacement of Vietnamese "boat people" after the Vietnam War. Alienation is Hatsushiba's principal theme. Happy New Year features a processional dragon, coiling around the reef like a sea-serpent while capsules of coloured dye explode to form underwater fireworks. The installation Garden of Globes is representative of a lunar landscape of silver orbs floats beneath a suspended canopy of rickshaws, old engine parts and other flotsam of Vietnamese urban life. Jun Nguyen-Hatsushiba's video work, Memorial Project Nha Trang, Vietnam: Towards the Complex—For the Courageous, the Curious, and the Cowards, was filmed in 2001 on the southeast coast of Vietnam. This was the artist's first video work and offers captivating images of local fishermen pulling cyclos (rickshaws) underwater toward an area where the artist stretched about thirty mosquito nets across the sea bed. The cyclos, submerged in deep water, represent the weight of tradition and reference Vietnam's historical past in the context of the country's struggle with the processes of modernization. Memorial Project Nha Trang, Vietnam also marked the beginning of Nguygen-Hatsushiba's ongoing project Breathing is Free 12,756.3. The project is the culmination of a body of work on the global refugee crisis. As Nguyen-Hatsushiba travels around the globe he will run through the cities and environments, working towards covering a distance equivalent to the earth's diameter (12,756.3 kilometers). To date Nguyen-Hatsushiba ran in Chicago, Taipei, Manchester, Singapore, Luang Prabang, Taichung, Karlsruhe, Ho Chi Minh City, Oami, Lucerne, and Geneva. A series of virtual earth drawings, illustrating the movement of populations around the world, serves as an exhibition counterpart along with installation pieces. Arizona State University Art Museum hosted to US premier of the exhibition. It has since travelled to Rymer Gallery, School of Art Institute of Chicago. Breathing is Free 12,756.3 is co-organized by the School of the Art Institute of Chicago.
