= Nam Xương =

Vietnamese playwright (1905–1958)

Nguyển Cát Ngạc, pen name Nam Xương (1905-1958) was a popular Vietnamese playwright in the 1930s. He is remembered as the author of the comedy Ổng Tây An Nam (The French Annamite, Monsieur Franco-Annamite) in 1931. This play satirized francophile Vietnamese, through the character of Len, a young Vietnamese completely Frenchified after his studies in France.
