= Claire Hsu =

Claire Hsu is the co-founder and the former executive director of Asia Art Archive (AAA), an independent non-profit organisation founded in 2000 to document and make accessible the multiple recent histories of art in Asia. In September 2021, Hsu stepped down as executive director of AAA after twenty-one years. She acts as the co-chair of AAA's board of directors.

Hsu is co-editor of Field Notes, AAA’s former e-journal and has participated as a speaker in a number of forums around the world. She served on the Museum Advisory Group, M+ Interim Board, M+ Board, and the Acquisitions Committee of M+ of the West Kowloon Cultural District between 2006 and 2022. She has been a member of the Board of the Foundation for Arts Initiatives since 2009. Hsu oversaw the vision document for a contemporary center at the former Hong Kong Central Police Station when Asia Art Archive was commissioned by the Hong Kong Jockey Club in 2010.

Hsu received the title of "Professor of Practice" by the Hong Kong Management Association Institute of Advanced Management Development in 2022. She is the recipient of the Montblanc de la Culture Arts Patronage Award by the Montblanc Cultural Foundation (2018), the Master of the Arts Award at the AmCham 12th Annual Women of Influence Conference & Awards (2015), the RBS Coutts/Financial Times Women in Asia Award (2009), and the Asian Cultural Council Starr Foundation Fellowship (2003). She was included in ArtReview's Power 100 List from 2009-2021. In 2013, she was selected as a Young Global Leader by the World Economic Forum. She was a member of the World Economic Forum's Global Council on the role of art in society.

She sits on the Advisory Board of Learning Together, a charity empowering young asylum seekers and refugees to take leadership in the community. She is the author of "I am Sam" published in 2022. Based on the true story of a refugee in Hong Kong, the book was included on the 2022–2023 Debbie Alvarez Picture Book Shortlist of the Golden Dragon Book Awards.

Hsu received a Bachelor of Arts degree in Chinese and history (1998) and a Master of Arts degree in art history (2000) from the School of Oriental and African Studies at SOAS University of London.

Hsu has been a longtime student of yoga and completed her foundation and advanced courses in yoga and ayurveda with Dancing Shiva. She has shared these teachings at different platforms.
