= Videotage =

Hong Kong-based art organisation

Videotage 錄映太奇

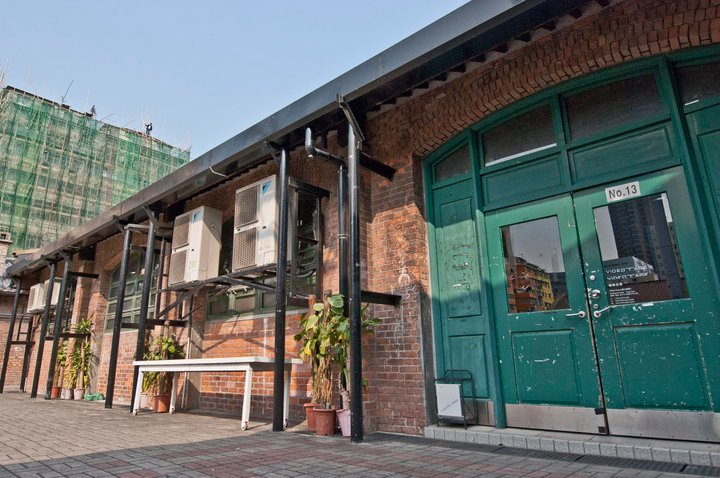
- Videotage office in Cattle Depot Artist Village unit No.13
- Formation: 1986
- Founder: Ellen Pau, May Fung, Wong Chi-fai, Comyn Mo
- Type: Nonprofit
- Location(s): Unit No.13, Cattle Depot Artist Village, 63 Ma Tau Kok Road, Ma Tau Kok, Kowloon, Hong Kong
- Board Chair: Kyle CHUNG
- Board of directors: Linda Chiu-han LAI, Emilie CHOI Sin-yi, Jaime HSU Fangtze, and YU Ka Ho.
- Website: https://www.videotage.org.hk/

Videotage (Chinese: 錄映太奇) is a Hong Kong–based non-profit art organisation dedicated to nurturing emerging media artists and the development of the local new media art community.

Since 1986, Videotage has evolved from an artist-run collective to a platform fostering the promotion, presentation, creation and preservation of new media art. Videotage has organised numerous events and programs including exhibitions, presentations, festivals, seminars, workshops, performances, residency program and cultural exchange programs, as well as continually distributing artworks through its networks and publications.

In 2008, Videotage has debuted Videotage Media Art Collection (VMAC), an offline and online video art archive that provides public access to historically important video artworks, event ephemera, and a collection of obsolete analog media art artefacts, offering a comprehensive documentary evidence and insight into the progression of art history and media over the past few decades.

== History ==
=== Origins ===
The name Videotage comes from ‘Video” and “Montage” – was first used for the title of a screening program organised by the Phoenix Cine Club in June 1986, featuring works by Jim Shum, Neco Lo, Wong Chi-fai and David Som. The program has offered a distinct focus on alternative time-based work, in which after the closure of Phoenix Cine Club, some of the artists member including Ellen Pau, May Fung, Wong Chi-fai and Comyn Mo adapted the name along with its experimental spirit, as the early formation of Videotage.

Videotage does develop but remains small. Without physical office space, the collective was para-sited at the headquarter of an avant-garde theatre group Zuni Icosahedron in Happy Valley between 1987 and 1997. Zuni's exhibition space often rented to Videotage for event hosting. During the time, numerous collaborations have nourished between the two groups, including alternative performance documentation, early exploration of multimedia/theatrical productions, and co-curating screening, workshops, and festivals. The collaboration expands it outreaches to local cultural institutions such as Fringe Club, City Contemporary Dance Company, and Hong Kong Arts Centre. In 1996, Videotage, Zuni and Urban Council co-presents Microwave Video Festival – City Image. The festival continues to operate as an annual video art festival for a decade, which later went independent and restructured to Microwave international New Media Arts Festival.

=== Oil Street Artist Village (1998–1999) ===
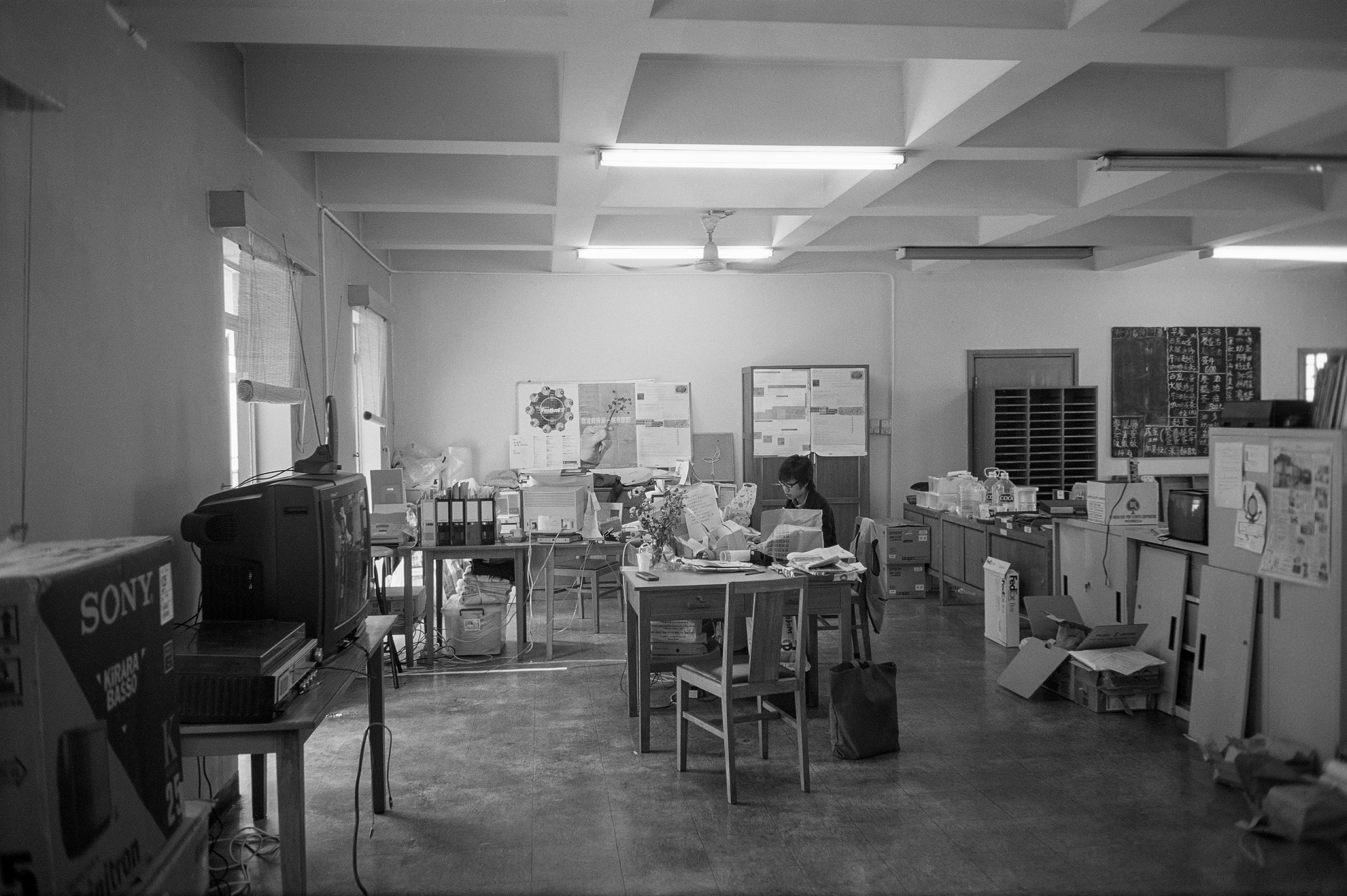
Office manager Fion Ng at the office of Videotage at Oil Street, 1999 ©Almond Chu

The space at Oil Street Artist Village (1998–1999) was Videotage's first office space. Located in the former Government Supplies Department Headquarters (GSDH) at Oil Street, North Point. With the establishment of Hong Kong Arts Development Council in 1995 and its funding support, Videotage has joined along with other artists' organisations to rent the unoccupied space creating the "first cultural hot spot" in Hong Kong. Located on the 9/F of a tall block in Oil Street Artist Village, Videotage indeed shared the spacious room with some local artists. Videotage also rented a room on the 8/F of the same building for editing (with Media 100) and equipment storage. During the time in Oil Street, Videotage has collaborated with the fellow resident artists for a number of important projects, notable events including Hong Kong Arts Festival 1998 Every Single Other Territory (My Own Idiosyncrasy Garden) Multimedia Performance, Microwave Video Festival 98'- Sight and Site, Video Circle (1999) installation exhibition (curated by Danny Yung, co-organised with HKUST Centre for the Arts), Sick and Dizzy media art exhibition (partnered with A Griffith Artworks Project, Griffith University).

During a short period of time after the closure of Oil Street Artist Village, Videotage was temporarily situated in Cheung Sha Wan Abattoir, along with other artist tenants.

=== Cattle Depot Artist Village (since 2001) ===
Located on 63 Ma Tau Kok Road, Ma Tau Kok, Kowloon, Hong Kong, the site was a former slaughterhouse named Ma Tau Kok Quarantine Depot (Chinese: 馬頭角牛畜檢疫站 or 馬頭角牛房), then later renovated into artist village in 2001. Videotage has moved in together with other artists groups that were originally tenants from Oil Street.

Since then Videotage has evolved in a major shift in role – from organising media art programs to artist residency with the intention to create platform for emerging media artists to articulate, exchange and research on the new media arts form. In the early days, Videotage’s productions has frequently shown and requested all over the world. In 2002 to 2003, more than 30 titles were distributed to 18 festivals, and many of the festivals had dedicated educational programmes, seminars and workshops. Notable international participations included Gwangju Biennial (Korea), Videobrasil Festival, European Media Arts Festival (Germany), Image Forum Festival (Japan).

As now Videotage have its own space, numerous of on-site exhibitions and residency showcases are organised. Recent notable exhibitions included Ersilia: Body of the Gateway Cities (2022), co-presented with FRAC Alsace, featuring Robert Cahen, Ellen Pau and Samson Young; and No References: A Revisit of Hong Kong Video and Media Art from 1985, with a series of talks, performances, and workshop situated in the Cattle Depot space.

== Governance ==
The current formation of Board of Directors are Kyle CHUNG (chairperson), Linda Chiu-han LAI, Emilie CHOI Sin-yi, Jaime Hsu Fang-Tze and Kaho Albert YU. Founder Ellen Pau remain as the long-term artistic director.

Videotage began to acquire full-time staffs from the continuous funding from HKADC since 1996. Notable team members include Connie Choi, Yvonne Lo, Fion Ng, Elaine Ng, Isaac Leung (chairman from 2013 to 2020), Alvis Choi, and Angel Leung.

== List of significant exhibitions and programmes ==
- Foundation - a Web3 Media Art Festival 未來史詩：網絡媒體藝術節 (2022)
- Artificial Landscape (2019)
- No References: A Revisit of Hong Kong Video and Media Art from 1985 (2016) Co-curated with SU Wei.
- One World Exposition 1 & 2.1 & 2.2, (2011-2012) & (2017-2018): in collaboration with Asia Art Archive, Hanart TZ Gallery, KEE Club, Osage Art Foundation, the School of Creative Media of the City University of Hong Kong and Spring Workshop, featuring eighteen contemporary media artists from both Hong Kong and mainland China, including Feng Mengbo, Ou Ning, Ellen Pau, Qiu Zhijie, Jeffrey Shaw, Johnnie To, Wang Jianwei, Yang Fudong, Danny Yung and Zhang Peili.
- Both Sides Now (2014- ): Flagship cultural exchange program in collaboration with VideoClub (UK)
- FUSE (2004-2020): Videotage's first residency program for media artist in Hong Kong offering a multi-disciplinary platform and intellectual resources that connect overseas and local artists, curators and researchers.
- Microwave Media Arts Festival (1996-2007)
- Video Cafe (1995)

== See also ==
- Cattle Depot Artist Village
- Zuni Icosahedron
