= May Fung =

Hong Kong filmmaker, visual artist

May Fung (Chinese: 馮美華; born 1952) is a filmmaker and visual artist who is based in Hong Kong, her work is acquired by institutions such as M+. In her early years, she worked as a civil servant at the Home Affairs Department. She has been engaged in experimental filmmaking and video art, especially during the 1970s and 1980s. Later, she integrated indie video art into theatre. She took on numerous roles in local cultural development. She once worked as a manager in the Hong Kong experimental theatre company Zuni Icosahedron, and as a consultant for the Hong Kong Arts Centre.

== Biography ==
Fung studied business after finishing HKCEE. She joined the government after being a clerk for a year and left until she reached to the position of chief training officer. Rejected by the senior for implementing a new proposal, she decided to leave the bureaucracy in 1998. During her time working in the government, she participated in filmmaking in her spare time.

Fung was taught by the Hong Kong producer Peter Yung. She began making experimental films in the 1970s, using Super 8 film, and later turned to video in the mid-1980s. In view of the Phoenix Cine Club (Chinese: 火鳥電影會) shutting down, she and three other artists: Ellen Pau, Wong Chi-fai and Comyn Mo, founded a video art collective, Videotage (Chinese: 錄映太奇).

Her content touched on more political and social issues after the 1989 Tiananmen Square protests and massacre. Later in the same year, she created She Said Why Me, a video depicting a blindfolded woman walking through the present-day streets of Hong Kong, and switching between historical black-and-white footages that were filming women in various public contexts, in which she explored her own relationship of space and identity between Hong Kong.

From 1998 to 1999, she participated in the Oil Street Artist Village. Around 2002, known with the previous experience, the landlord of Foo Tak Building in Wan Chai invited Fung to convert the units inside for art and cultural use. Fung founded Arts and Cultural Outreach (ACO). Since 2003, ACO has turned 14 units (later 20) of the building into cultural spaces, allowing artists and art organizations to use the spaces at affordable rents. ACO later transformed a unit into an artist-in-residency. In 2008, the non-profit organization ACO officially established itself as an indie bookshop. In 2015, Foo Tak’s owner decided to donate all of her units to Arts and Cultural Outreach (ACO), an organization founded by Fung.

As one of the founding members of HKICC Lee Shau Kee School of Creativity, the first secondary school focusing on art in Hong Kong, Fung acted as the second principal. She is also an assessor for the Hong Kong Arts Development Council, and advisor to Home Affairs Bureau and Leisure and Cultural Services Department.

== Selected exhibitions ==
=== Solo exhibitions ===
- Para Site: Everything starts from “Here”—Retrospective Exhibition of May Fung (2002)

=== Group exhibitions ===
- M+: Five Artists: Sites Encountered (2019)
- Hong Kong Museum of Art: New Horizons: Ways of Seeing Hong Kong Art in the 80s and 90s (2021-2022)
