= Microwave International New Media Arts Festival =

Microwave International New Media Arts Festival (Chinese: 微波國際新媒體藝術節) is a new media art festival based in Hong Kong. It began in 1996 as the annual video art festival for local video art collective Videotage.

In 2006, it became independent from Videotage and in 2007 it officially became fully independent as the government's previous "presenter" role was handed over to Microwave. The government remains the main sponsor of the Festival, although many more sponsors are sought for each year's Festival.

The annual festival generally includes a main exhibition at the Hong Kong City Hall, a smaller scale and usually more alternative exhibition in a separate venue, a keynote conference, performances, screening programmes and other special events organised each year.

In 2007, the performance by US art collective Graffiti Research Lab that "hacked the city" with their L.A.S.E.R.T.A.G along with the participation of local graffiti artist MC Yan, they achieved a record-breaking tag 1,200 metres across Victoria Harbour (James Powderly and MC Yan tagging from Central ferry, with Evan Roth and the local crew controlling the set up in front of the Cultural Centre in Tsim Sha Tsui).

In its first extended event outside of the annual November Festival, Microwave also held the "A-Glow-Glow" Macro Interactive Media Art Exhibition in April 2008, which was funded by the Hong Kong Arts Development Council and aimed for more mass appeal. Two large-scale interactive LED artworks were placed by the Tsim Sha Tsui waterfront, right across the harbour from the Hong Kong City Hall, where the annual festival main exhibition is held.

Microwave's festival design, by local design partner Milkxhake, also consistently wins design awards almost every year since their partnership commenced.

== History and connection with Videotage ==
Microwave International New Media Arts Festival began as an annual video art festival for the Hong Kong-based non-profit organisation Videotage in 1996. As new technologies became more accessible and were used in new forms of art production, the festival expanded to include a wider range of new media art. It was the first art festival in Hong Kong dedicated to the development and presentation of new media art, and has since steadily grown into a well-established festival that combine exhibitions of new media art with keynote conferences, video screenings and other programmes to nurture emerging media artists and develop the media arts community in Hong Kong.

Microwave Festival '97 was directed by the artist, curator and researcher Ellen Pau, and invited artists from Germany, the US, the UK, the Netherlands, Australia, and Denmark. The festival was held at the Exhibition Hall at Hong Kong City Hall. It included screenings of 4 video artworks ('Signal-techno', 'Culture interface', 'Loco-motion', 'Superman and Wonderwoman'), a 'Being Digital' CD-Rom Exhibition, a conference, seminar, and workshop. This edition of the festival explored the possibilities of the CD-ROM as a medium for storage and distribution and elucidated strategies employed by artists to re-think the "interface" as an intimate space between screens and their users.

== Festival 2010 ==
Screenarcadia (天下太屏)

== Festival 2009 ==
Nature Transformer (自然反)

== Festival 2008 ==
Transient Creatures (異生界)

== Extended exhibition - April 2008 ==
"A-Glow-Glow" Macro Interactive Media Art Exhibition

"A-Glow-Glow" was held by the waterfront in Tsim Sha Tsui (Kowloon Peninsula), with two interactive LED installations by two artist groups:

- Teddy Lo (Hong Kong) — Phaeodaria (placed by the Museum of Art)
- United Visual Artists (United Kingdom) — Volume (placed on Avenue of Stars)

== Festival 2007 ==
Luminous Echo (形光譜)

Microwave International New Media Arts Festival
2023	N.H Intelligence	人.鬼.獸
2022	Half Half	半半
2021	Yesterday's Ficition	今未來
2020	Sharp Chronicles	後實錄
2019	E.A.T.	煙‧起‧天
2018	Much Ado About Everything	萬有之間
2017	Cyberia	電元種生
2016	Be Water II	行雲若水
2015	Be Water I	上善若水
2014	Living Architecture	好望閣
2013	Terra 0	天零零
