= 1a space =

Art space in Hong Kong

1a space is an independent art space, known as one of the oldest experimental art venues, in Hong Kong. Founded by a group of Hong Kong cultural workers, the space was first opened in Oil Street in 1998, which marked the beginning of Hong Kong's first artists' village and relocated to Cattle Depot Artist Village in 2001.

One of the co-founders mentioned that the name was derived from the KMB Route 1A bus route.

Over the past two decades, 1a space has organized more than 160 exhibitions and has been considered as one of the longest-living incubators for contemporary artists in Hong Kong. The founding members include artists Choi Yan-chi, Howard Chan, and Hiram To.
