= Oil Street Artist Village =

Former art colony in Hong Kong

Oil Street Artist Village (Chinese: 油街藝術村) was an artist community occupying the former Government Supplies Department Headquarters (GSDH) at Oil Street, Fortress Hill, Hong Kong from 1998 to 2000. It has been described as Hong Kong's first artists colony.

== History ==
The Oil Street Government Supplies Department compound was vacated after the relocation of the department in 1998. The Hong Kong Government had initially planned to sell the compound for commercial purpose, but suspended land sale temporarily in 1998, following a downward trend in the real estate market as a consequence of the 1997 Asian financial crisis. The land was instead rented to local artists and organisations on a short-term lease with a low rental fee of HK$ 2.5 dollars per square foot in July 1998.

Tenants comprised about 40 artists, designers and cultural organizations including 1a space, Videotage and the Artist Commune.

In the late 1990s, authorities issued an eviction notice to reclaim the compound. In response, the tenants formed an organized activist lobby group, Save Oil Street. The group held creative campaigns and public protests to demand recognition of the cultural value of the space. Archival materials from the movement and artist space are now preserved in special collections at archives like the Asia Art Archive and Hong Kong Art Archive.

The artists of Oil Street Artist Village were evacuated in late 1999 and early 2000, following the government proposition to sell the land. They were temporarily relocated to the Cheung Sha Wan Abattoir and the site of the former airport at Kai Tak as well as several factory buildings. In 2001, they were allowed to settle in the former Ma Tau Kok Quarantine Depot, that was subsequently renamed Cattle Depot Artist Village. Artists groups also moved later into industrial buildings in Fo Tan.

The Oil Street Government Supplies Department building that had been rented to artists was finally demolished years later, after land sale had been further postponed.

The Oi! art space opened in 2013, developed by the Leisure and Cultural Services Department, and aiming at promoting arts and providing venue for exhibition. It is located at 12 Oil Street, within the former clubhouse of Royal Hong Kong Yacht Club from 1908 to 1938, and next to the site of the demolished Government Supplies Department building, which housed the former Oil Street Artist Village.
