= Oi! (Hong Kong) =

Art gallery in Hong Kong, China

Oil Street Art Space (Oi!)
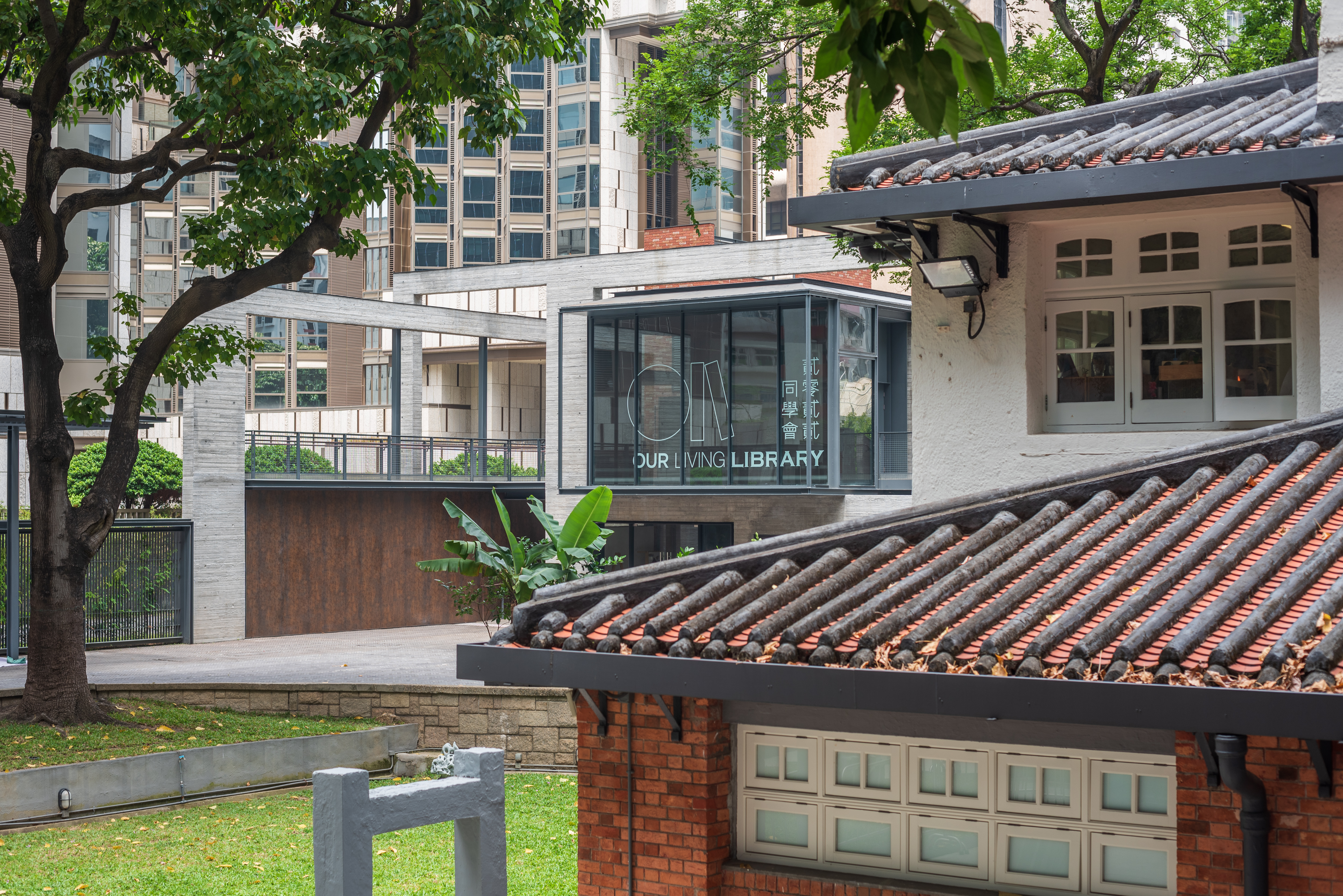
- Red-brick complex of Oi! and the newly-built Oi! Glassie

- Location within Hong Kong
- Former names: Royal Hong Kong Yacht Club

General information
- Architectural style: Arts and Crafts
- Location: 12 Oil Street, Causeway Bay, Hong Kong, China
- Coordinates: 22°17′18.29″N 114°11′34.17″E

Design and construction
- Designations: Grade II historic building

Website
- Official site

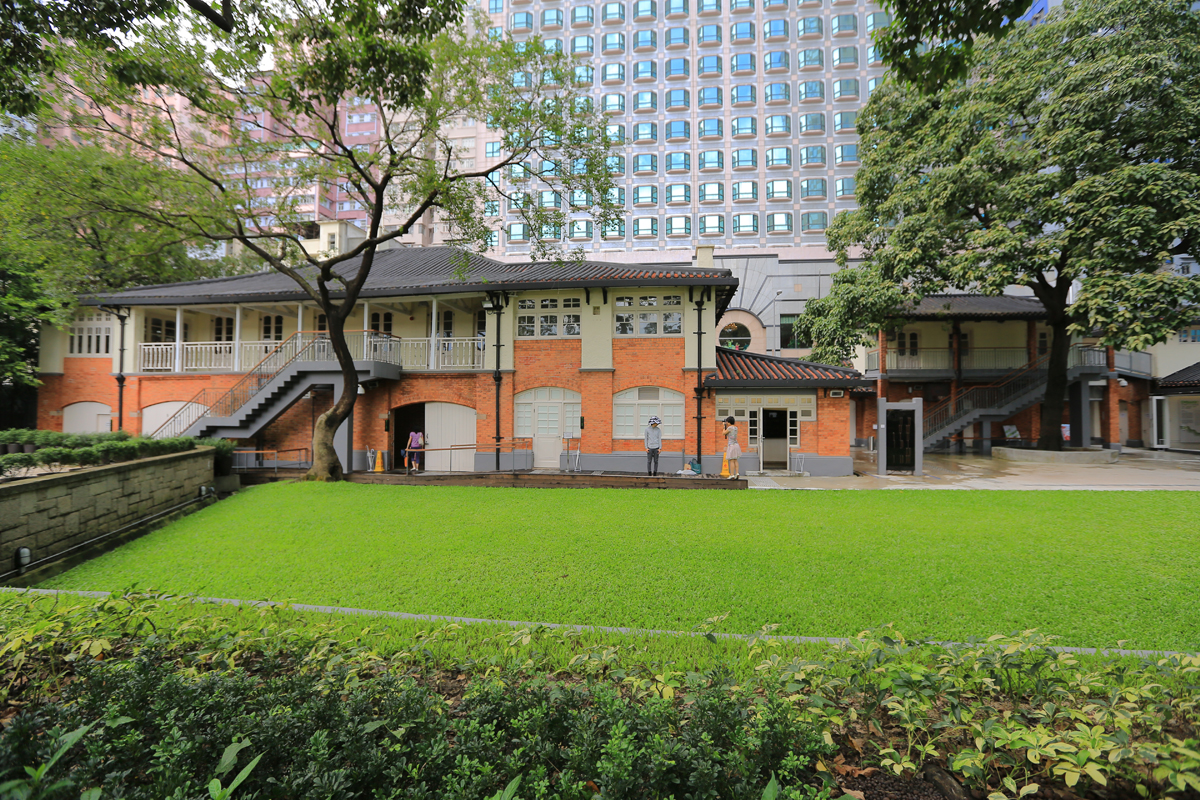
Former headquarters and clubhouse of the Royal Hong Kong Yacht Club, at the corner of Oil Street and Electric Road, Causeway Bay.

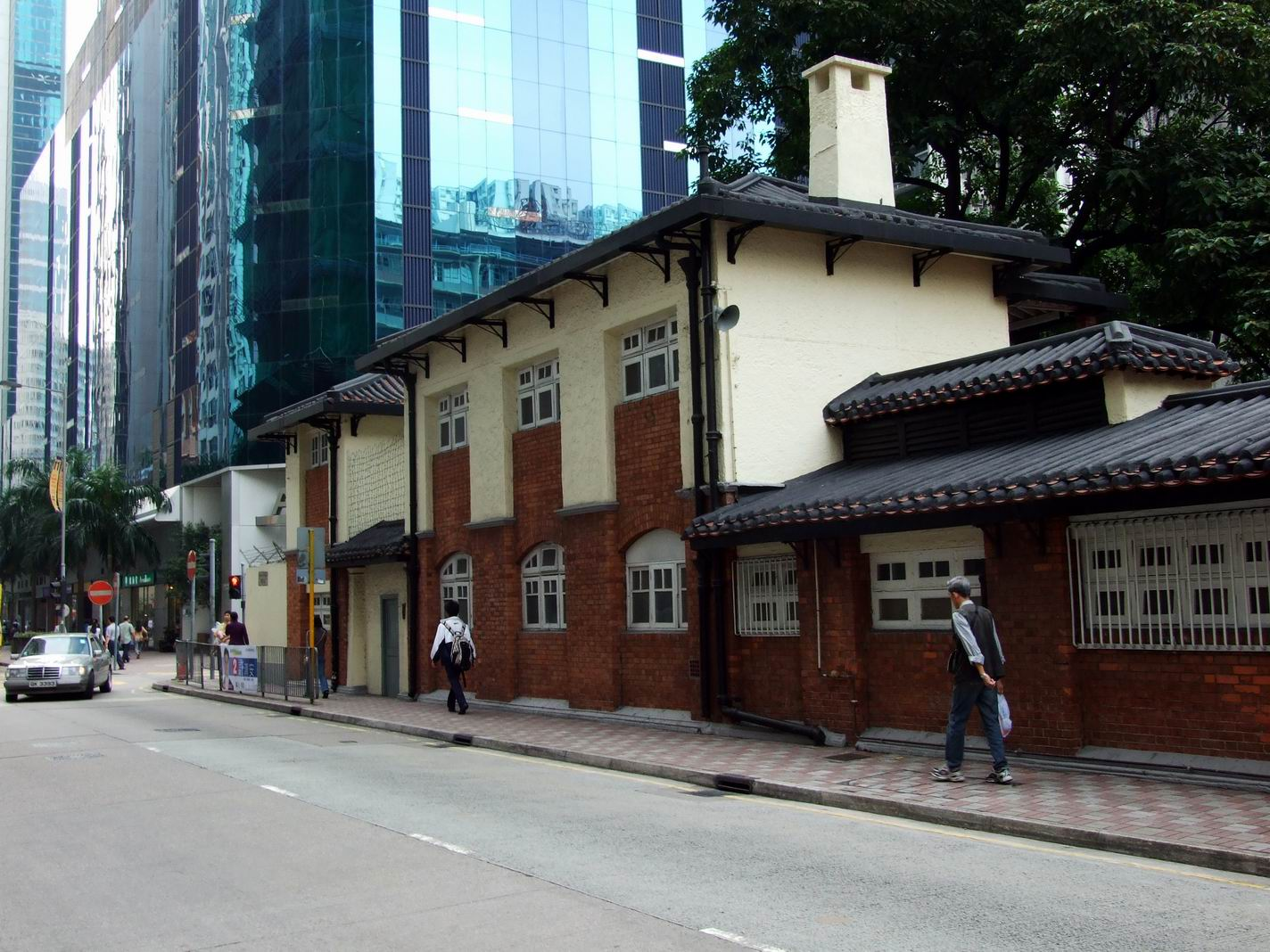
Oi! building, formerly the Royal Hong Kong Yacht Club, along Electric Road.

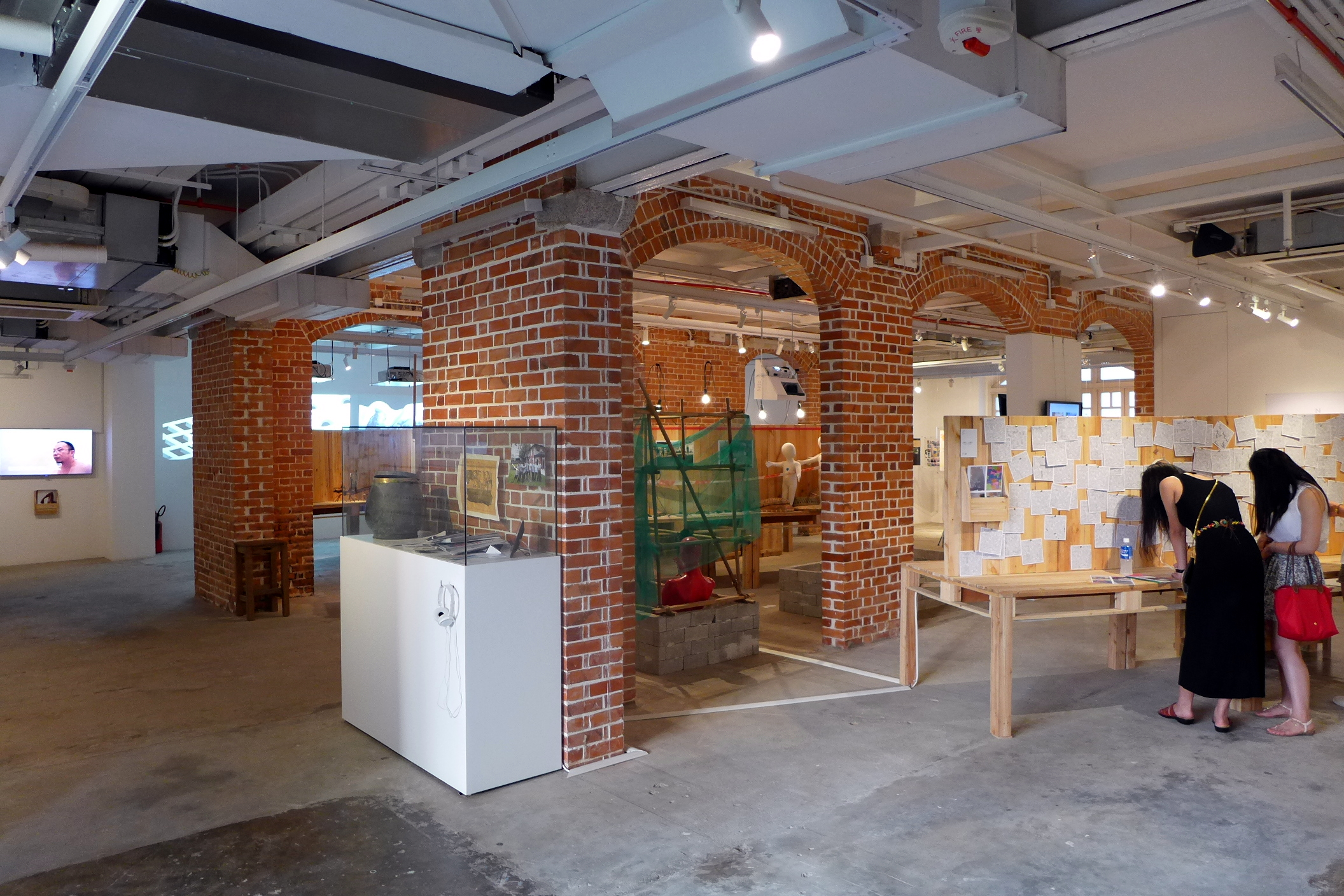
Exhibit area

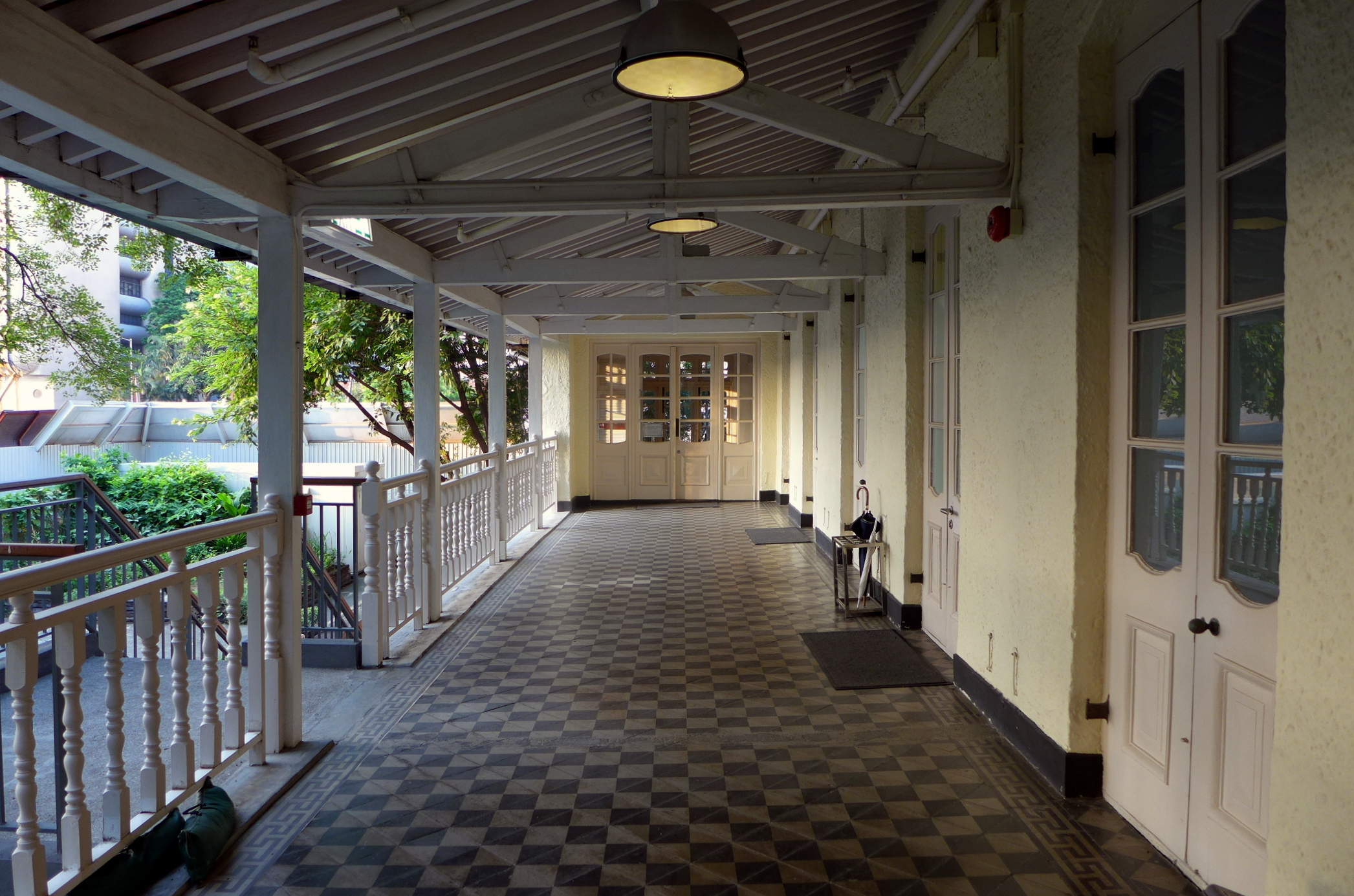
Oi! building outside balcony

Oi! is a Hong Kong government art promotion organisation. It was developed by the Leisure and Cultural Services Department, and aims to promote visual arts by providing a platform for art exhibitions, forums and other art-related activities. It is situated at 12 Oil Street, North Point, at the corner of Electric Road.

== Buildings ==
The organisation is housed in a complex that comprises a main and two ancillary buildings. The complex was built in 1908 and served as the Royal Hong Kong Yacht Club headquarters and clubhouse until 1938. Built in the Arts and Crafts style, it was officially opened on 21 March 1908 by the then Governor, Sir Frederick Lugard. The site lost its initial waterfront location due to subsequent reclamation, and the Club headquarters moved to Kellett Island.

After World War II, the buildings were used as a garage, government staff quarters and for storage by the Government Supplies Department. Until 1998, they were part of the larger Government Supplies Department compound that included the department's headquarters. From 1998 to early 2000, the buildings of the compound were leased out on a short-term basis. They attracted a number of creative teams to develop arts in the area and housed the Oil Street Artist Village (油街藝術村). The government finally evicted the tenants, citing their lack of permits or insurance. A number of artists relocated to the Cattle Depot Artist Village in 2001, and some relocated to Foo Tak Building (富德樓) in 2003. The buildings were used as a storehouse of the Antiquities and Monuments Office until late 2007, and thereafter the site was developed into a combination of private residential buildings, a hotel and public space Oi!.

The Former Clubhouse of Royal Hong Kong Yacht Club (前香港皇家遊艇會會所) has been listed as a Grade II historic building since 1995.

== Aims and objectives ==
Since its inception, Oi! has aimed to inspire local communities through the experience of art co-creation, including:

- To serve as means of uniting people by offering an innovative and engaging program to encourage collaboration and co-creation in art.
- Spark passion for art in people's heart, bringing dynamism to the field of art by helping new audiences to connect with art and participate in the creative process.
- Sustain artist development by injecting art into everyday life, so that it becomes an integral part of life in communities as they grow and evolve.
- Fuel creative thinking among artists by promoting art exchanges and experimentation for new creative ideas.

== Activities ==
Since its opening in May 2013, Oi! has organized exhibitions and activities that are art-related, promoting community engagement. Activities are grouped as Y! Projects, E! Projects and A! Projects.

Y! Projects provides a platform for young artists to develop creative talents through exhibitions and sharing. They can exchange their ideas with professionals, showcase their works and raise their profiles under this project. This project provides opportunities for new artists to learn and gain recognition, like "Sparkle! Art for the future", that encourages discussion and exploration of the relationship between art, contemporary life and social issues.

E! Projects allows artists and community groups to exchange and create new insights through activities like "XCHANGE", "Connectivity! Urban Arc-tion". The activities provide a platform to promote arts, architecture, local issues and stories through social interactions.

A! Projects provides a platform for artists and local residents to create environmental displays that merge art with the urban environment in the city. It allows participants to integrate art into daily life and make it to become a life defining attitude. "Living Art Projects" allows artists and citizens to beautify buildings under the theme "Green Art". It injects public's creativity into daily life and let participants experience art in their daily life.

== Impact on the community ==
Located in an urban area, Oi!'s historic Arts and Crafts building provides a contrast to surrounding newly built hotels and skyscrapers. It has an outdoor learning area that aims to inspire the public, particularly children's interests in the arts.

== The new extension of Oi! ==
In order to provide more space to inspire greater imagination, Oi! rolled out an expansion project in 2019, to integrate an adjacent outdoor space of over 3,000 square feet with the original premises, developing into a community leisure space and a cultural venue.

The new extension of Oi! has been opened to the public on 24 May 2022. New facilities include Oi! Glassie, Oi! Garden, Oi! Lounge and Oi! Deck.

== See also ==
- Jockey Club Creative Arts Centre
