= Hong Kong cultural policy =

Hong Kong cultural policy refers to the development and preservation of Hong Kong's arts and cultural heritage. Globally, Hong Kong is perhaps best known for its role as an international financial centre and shopping hub, and not for its artistic and cultural offerings. The popular stereotype of the city holds that its residents are far too focused on getting and spending to concern themselves with the ephemeral affairs of art and culture.

Yet in recent years the city's government, residents, and the media have brought more attention to the development of the city's arts scene and preservation of the former British colony's unique cultural heritage. It has been argued that the role of art and culture in Hong Kong has taken on increasing prominence in city's search for an identity in the ten years since China resumed sovereignty over the territory. The limitations on democracy in post-colonial Hong Kong may lead more residents to seek expression or confirmation of their identities through arts and culture.

== Cultural policy ==
The administration of arts and culture in Hong Kong has undergone major changes since Hong Kong's handover to China in 1997. Cultural matters, previously under the auspices of the two Municipal Councils, now fall mainly under the purview of the Leisure and Cultural Services Department (LCSD) and the Hong Kong Arts Development Council (ADC). The government's formal cultural policy statement is available on the website of the Home Affairs Bureau.

The ADC is a statutory body established in 1995 to replace the former Council of Performing Arts. The ADC is responsible for promoting broad development of the arts, makes recommendations to the government on cultural policy and development and provides funding for cultural organisations. However, the ADC has been criticised for lacking the executive power and resources to implement policies directly. The current chief executive of the ADC, Jonathan Yu, took up his position in April 2005 after more than two decades with the Kowloon–Canton Railway Corporation.

The LCSD organises artistic and cultural activities and manages a number of cultural facilities. LCSD manages 15 performance venues and 16 museums throughout Hong Kong. The Antiquities and Monuments Office, part of the LCSD, is responsible for heritage conservation and education in Hong Kong.

The Culture and Heritage Commission (CHC) was set up in April 2000 to advise on cultural policy and funding priorities. Its Policy Recommendation Report, submitted in April 2003, has been adopted as the blueprint for Hong Kong's cultural policy. The CHC set forth six general principles to guide Hong Kong's cultural policy: The six principles are "people-oriented", "pluralism", "freedom of expression and protection of intellectual property", "holistic approach", "partnership" and "community-driven."

Other proposed policy reforms include increased corporatisation of government-sponsored cultural organisations, small scale public-private partnerships, and the controversial West Kowloon Cultural District Development Project.

The government has commissioned a number of studies on Hong Kong's creative industries and cultural policy. Yet to date, many of the ongoing policy issues have not been resolved. Critics have complained of the government's over-reliance on advisory committees and consultations in managing cultural affairs on the grounds that it is inefficient and contrary to global trends in arts administration.

== Funding and support for the arts ==
The Hong Kong government allocates around US $300 million (US$43 per capita) per year. for culture and arts, which accounts for about 1 percent of total government spending. The HKSAR Government claims that this is "broadly comparable to that in some Western countries" such as France. However, in monetary terms, France's per capita spend for culture is 197.20 Euro/US$250 per year. There is due to the fact that Hong Kong's public spending as a percentage of GDP is low compared with other developed nations. On average Government expenditures were more than 40% of GDP in OECD countries in 2001. In 2008 the French government’s expenditure amounted to over 50% of its total GDP, whereas Hong Kong’s figure is around 19%.

In the 2006-2007 Policy Address, Hong Kong Chief Executive Donald Tsang announced that the Arts and Sport Development Fund would receive US $5 million to support cultural activities.

The ADC receives an annual subvention of around US $12 million from the Home Affairs Bureau and around US $3 million on average from the Arts and Sports Development Fund. In addition to providing grants to arts groups, the ADC has established an Arts Service Centre in Sheung Wan to provide office space and facilities for smaller arts organizations.

The LCSD provides funding for the annual Hong Kong Arts Festival and nine professional performing companies: the Hong Kong Philharmonic Orchestra, Hong Kong Chinese Orchestra, Hong Kong Sinfonietta, Hong Kong Dance Company, Hong Kong Ballet, City Contemporary Dance Company, Hong Kong Repertory Theatre, Chung Ying Theatre, Zuni Icosahedron and Theatre Ensemble . In addition to individual events, it also organizes two arts festivals per year: the summer International Arts Carnival for families and children, and a themed arts festival in the fall.

== Film industry ==
Globally, Hong Kong's most noted contribution in terms of arts and culture has come through its film industry, which is the world's third largest (after Hollywood and Bollywood). Hong Kong films have received worldwide critical acclaim and have been remade into blockbuster films by Hollywood, while Hong Kong directors and actors (such as John Woo, Jackie Chan, Michelle Yeoh and Chow Yun-fat) have gone on to find crossover success in Hollywood.

Hong Kong's film industry has suffered since its last heyday of the 1980s and early 1990s, and the government has recently introduced measures to boost the film industry but this has failed miserably. The death of the Arts in Hong Kong is in large part due to an atmosphere of fear and self-censorship that the Hong Kong Chinese imposed upon themselves after the 1997 handover.

In the 2006-2007 Policy Address the Chief Executive proposed the establishment of a Hong Kong Film Development Council to support film production in the city. In his 2007-2008 budget, Financial Secretary Henry Tang announced that US$40 million would be earmarked for a new fund to finance film production and professional development within the industry.

== Events ==
Hong Kong is home to numerous cultural events and festivals throughout the year.

- Hong Kong International Chamber Music Festival - January
- Hong Kong Arts Festival – February/March
- Hong Kong International Film Festival – March/April
- Shakespeare in the Port – April
- Le French May – May
- Hong Kong International Arts Carnival – July/August
- New Vision Arts Festival – October/November
- Clockenflap – November

== Arts education ==
The Hong Kong Academy for Performing Arts is Hong Kong's only tertiary institution devoted to the performing arts, film, television and related technical arts.

== Heritage conservation and collective memory ==
After the demolition of the Star Ferry Pier in December 2006 led to widely publicised protests, the government is reviewing its policies on heritage conservation. The Antiquities and Monuments Office has published a list of 491 graded historic structures throughout the territory, though no decision has been made on the extent of protection for these buildings.

Hong Kong's collective memory, as manifested in its street markets, food culture, and artisanal traditions, is also being integrated into the city's cultural policy.
