= Lai Tat Tat Wing =

Hong Kong comics artist

- Traditional Chinese: 黎達達榮
- Simplified Chinese: 黎达达荣
Transcriptions
Standard Mandarin
- Hanyu Pinyin: Lí Dádáróng
Yue: Cantonese
- Jyutping: lai4 daat6 daat6 wing4

Lai Tat-wing
- Traditional Chinese: 黎達榮
- Simplified Chinese: 黎达荣
Transcriptions
Standard Mandarin
- Hanyu Pinyin: Lí Dáróng
Yue: Cantonese
- Jyutping: lai4 daat6 wing4

Lai Tat-wing (Chinese: 黎達榮), active as Lai Tat Tat Wing (Chinese: 黎達達榮), is a Hong Kong comics artist.

He has a character called Woody Woody Wood (木積積), described in 2015 by HK Magazine as Lai's "signature character".

== History ==
Lai had drawn works as a teenager, but as an adult, at first worked in an office. In 1991 he saw a theatre programme by Zuni Icosahedron and received inspiration to continue drawing.

Lai began doing work on comics in 1995. The South China Morning Post described his initial comics as "experimental". Lau Kit Wai of the South China Morning Post wrote that "unusual visuals and story-telling techniques" were elements in Lai's work.

He wrote the Chinese language comic Twinkle Twinkle Little Star, which was published in 2005. In 2008 a French translation appeared, and the comic in January 2008 appeared at the Angoulême International Comics Festival. The French title of the work is L’Enfer de Jade, and Casterman is the French publisher.

By 2008, Lai stated that he withdrew from the Hong Kong manhua scene and argued that there was a lack of distinction in such comics that had appeared in previous generations.

By 2015, Lai became the artist in residence for Zuni Icosahedron. Additionally, as of that year, media including Woody Woody Wood was in issues of Ming Pao Weekly.

== See also ==
- Hong Kong comics
