= Sheung Shui Slaughterhouse =

Slaughterhouse in New Territories, Hong Kong

Coordinates: 22.512795°N 114.117635°E

- 上水屠房
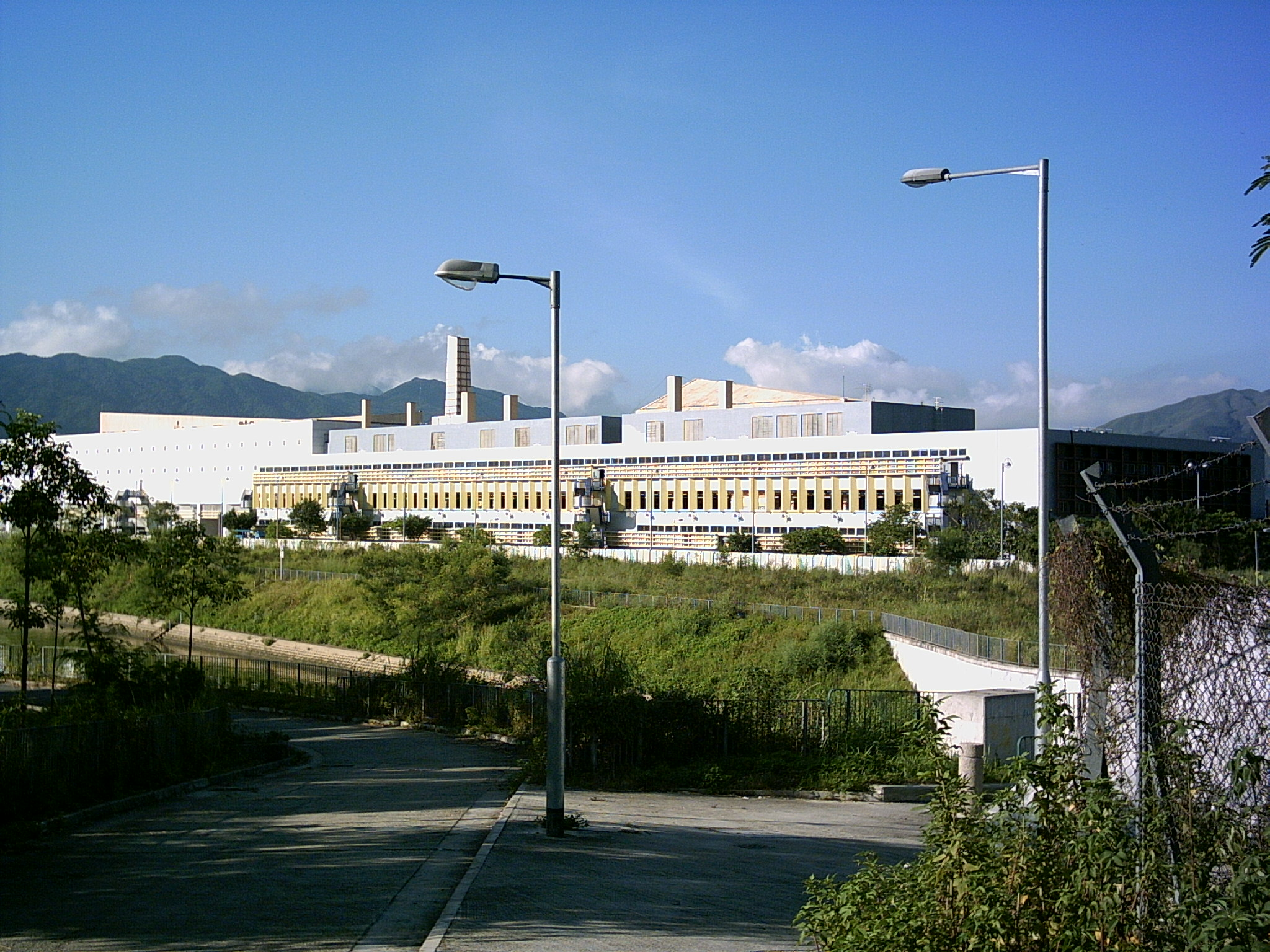
- Interactive map of the Sheung Shui Slaughterhouse area

General information
- Status: Complete, operational
- Type: Abattoir
- Construction started: 18 February 1997; 29 years ago
- Completed: June 1999; 27 years ago
- Client: Regional Services Department
- Owner: Government of Hong Kong

Technical details
- Floor count: 3-4

Design and construction
- Architect: Architectural Services Department
- Main contractor: China State Construction & Engineering Corporation

The Sheung Shui Slaughterhouse (Chinese: 上水屠房; Jyutping: soeng6 seoi2 tou4 fong4) is a slaughterhouse in the outskirts of Sheung Shui, New Territories, Hong Kong. The installation was built by China State Construction. Construction began in February 1997, at a cost of HK$ 1.858 billion. It covers 5.8 hectares and is the largest slaughterhouse in Hong Kong, as well as being one of the largest in Asia according to the Architectural Services Department.

As of January 2000, pollution and hygienic controls of the slaughterhouse conform to international standard, and received ISO 14001 environmental management certification. The slaughterhouse is currently managed and operated by Ng Fung Hong Limited, who were contracted by the Hong Kong Government.

Today, the slaughterhouse can accommodate 12,000 pigs and 2,200 cows. It is outfitted with sewage treatment, a water recycling plant and advanced slaughter machines which can operate mostly without manpower. The facility can slaughter up to 5,000 pigs, 400 cows and 300 lambs per day.

== History ==
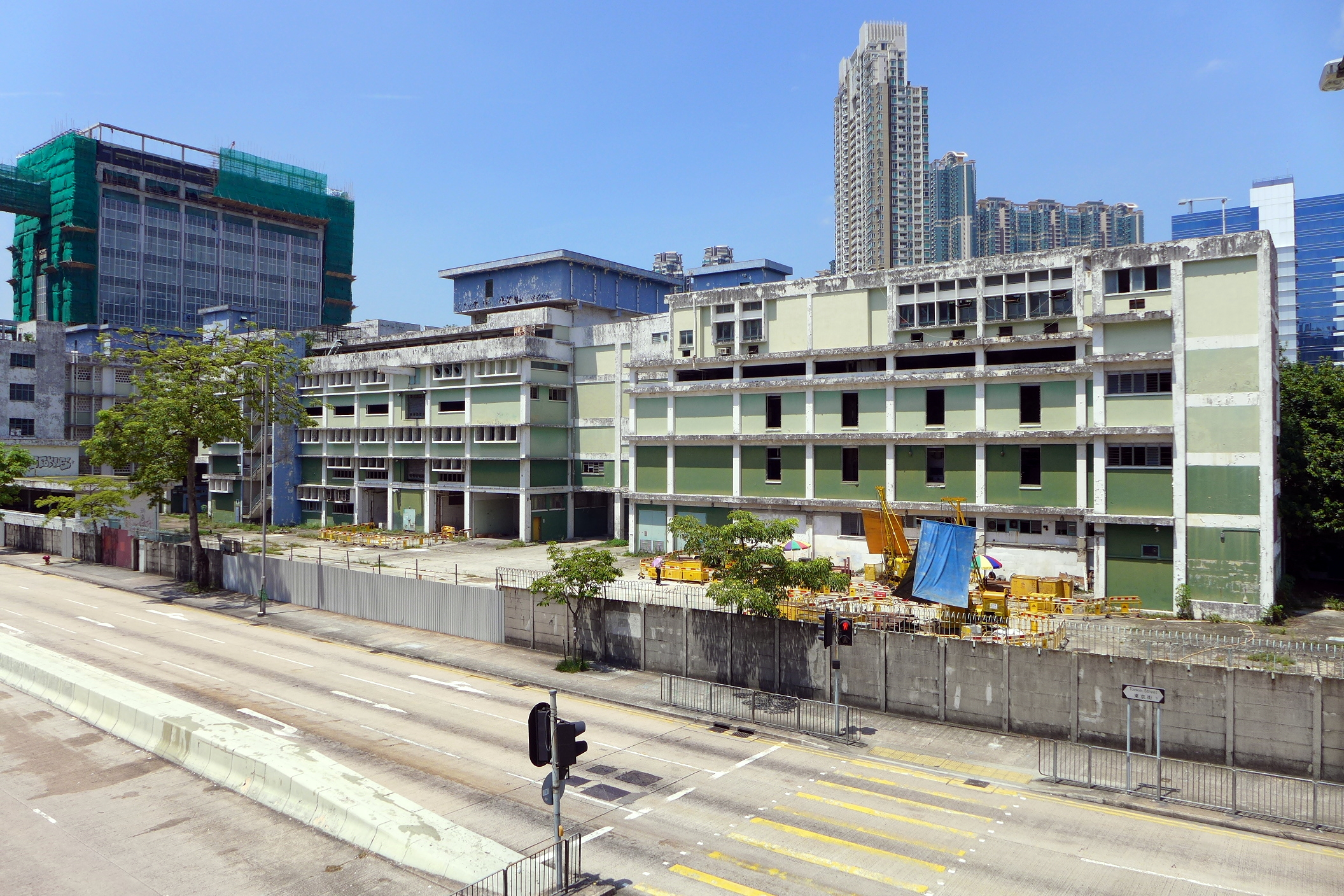
The closed Cheung Sha Wan Abattoir

The Sheung Shui Slaughterhouse replaced older slaughterhouses in Kennedy Town, Cheung Sha Wan and Yuen Long, which were closed for economic reasons as well as their proximity to urban areas. Reprovisioning the three abattoirs in a more remote area allowed the government to open 4.19 hectares of land for redevelopment of a type "more compatible with the surrounding areas". Additionally, the location in Sheung Shui, near the border with mainland China, allows livestock to be offloaded immediately after crossing the Hong Kong border, negating the need to run noisy and smelly livestock trains through developed areas.

Construction of the slaughterhouse commenced on 18 February 1997. It was substantially completed in June 1999 and fully commissioned by March 2000.

== Description ==
The slaughterhouse is a complex of several interconnected blocks.

- Lairage block (38,000 square metres, 3 storeys)
- Slaughter block (11,800 square metres, 3 storeys)
- Meat despatch block (2,200 square metres, single storey)
- Administration block (2,950 square metres, 4 storeys)
- Platform and railway siding area (2,520 square metres, single storey)

The designed daily throughput of the facility is 5,000 pigs, 100 suckling pigs, 400 cattle and 300 goats.

There is an underground wastewater treatment plant of approximately 9,500 square metres. It can treat 5,000 square metres of wastewater per day. The effluent from the slaughterhouse is 10 times more concentrated than domestic effluent, so the on-site treatment plant uses bacteria and micro-organisms to treat the wastewater to domestic standard before discharging it to the adjacent Shek Wu Hui Sewage Treatment Works for final treatment.

The abattoir incorporates several green features. A solar hot water system, comprising 450 solar panels on the rooftop of the meat despatch block, helps meet the daily hot water requirements of 630 cubic metres. A heat pump makes use of heat from the air conditioning to further heat the water. Greywater from the adjacent sewage treatment works is used for cooling the condenser of the slaughterhouse air conditioning plant.

The Sheung Shui Slaughterhouse is the largest slaughterhouse in Hong Kong.

== Transport ==
Before the Sheung Shui Slaughterhouse opened, the freight trains that carried livestock from Mainland China through the Lo Wu border station would terminate at Hung Hom station, which was once the south-most end of former KCR British Section / East Rail.

This slaughterhouse is set in the outskirts in Sheung Shui, next to the rail tracks of MTR East Rail line between Lo Wu station and Sheung Shui station. A dedicated rail branch and freight station were built for unloading the livestock. This relieved the already busy East Rail line, which previously shared with the East Rail commuter trains and Through Train service. The dedicated branch also avoids the waiting passengers and residents near East Rail, thus no longer exposing them to the stench from livestock trains.

== See also ==
- Animal slaughter
- Smithfield, Hong Kong, historical location of another cattle depot in Hong Kong
- Cattle Depot Artist Village
