= Ellen Pau =

Chinese artist, curator, and researcher

- Born: 1961 (age 64–65); Hong Kong
- Notable work: Recycling Cinema
- Spouse: Mandy Wong

Chinese name
- Traditional Chinese: 鮑藹倫
- Simplified Chinese: 鲍蔼伦
- Hanyu Pinyin: Bào Ǎilún
- Yale Romanization: Baau1 Oi2 Leun4
- Jyutping: baau1 oi2 leon4

Ellen Pau (born 1961) is an artist, curator and researcher based in Hong Kong. She is also co-founder of Videotage and founding artistic director of the Microwave International New Media Arts Festival. The artist's first retrospective exhibition in Hong Kong was organized by Para Site in 2018. The exhibition included major video installations ranging from the 1980s to the present.

== Early life ==
Pau graduated from Diagnostic Radiography in 1985 at Hong Kong Polytechnic University and has worked as a professional radiographer and mammographer in Queen Mary Hospital.

Ellen Pau was born to a family of medical doctors. Growing up, she was immersed in an intellectual environment enriched by her father's intensive scientific knowledge. When she was nine-years old, Pau received a Kodak 135 film camera from her father and became interested in photographic techniques and the world of imagery.

During her undergraduate study, she worked as a stage actor, music editor, and concert organizer while at Polytechnic. She also joined experimental theatre company Zuni Icosahedron where she became more familiar with contemporary art. A mostly self-taught artist, she gained a master's degree in Visual Culture at Chinese University of Hong Kong in 2008.

Pau's interest in art and technology perhaps could be traced back to her visit to the Expo '70 when she was eight-year-old. The Expo '70 has been massively promoted in Asia, including Hong Kong. With her family, Pau had spent a few days at the Expo and went through most of the pavilions. One of them with people doing weird things and with a lot of screens leaves a great impression on her. She later found out that what she saw was the Pepsi-Cola Pavilion Project (1968-1972) by renowned American experimental group, Experiments in Art and Technology (E.A.T.).

== Work ==
Inspired by 1960s filmmakers and artists such as Jean-Luc Godard and Martha Rosler, Pau created her first super-8 film Glove in 1984. In the early 1990s, Pau began to create video installations, such as Alice Doesn’t Live Here Anymore in collaboration with Chan Pik Yu and Jesse Dai and Recycling Cinema (1998), a video that captures blurred images of moving vehicles on a Hong Kong highway, was exhibited at the Hong Kong Pavilion in the 49th Venice Biennale in 2001, and in Art and China after 1989: Theater of the World at the Guggenheim Museum (2017).

Pau is active as a curator and organizer in the art world. A vocal supporter of the independent arts scene, she has advocated for increasing funding and exhibition opportunities for artists in non-traditional. In 1986, together with Wong Chi-fai, May Fung, and Comyn Mo, she founded Videotage, Hong Kong's oldest video and media art space. In 1996, she founded Microwave International New Media Arts Festival, an annual event that includes exhibitions, conferences, seminars, school tours and workshops. Pau has also independently curated exhibitions including Digit@logue (2008) at the Hong Kong Museum of Art. From 2013 to 2019, Pau was appointed by the Hong Kong Arts Development Council (HKADC) as a representative of the arts sector in Film Arts. Later in 2014, she was further appointed to the interim acquisition committee of M+ in West Kowloon Cultural District to advise on collection development.

Works by Pau can be found in these collections: VMAC, Videotage and Video Bureau.

=== Videography ===
Title	Year	Length	Format	Notes
Glove	1984		Super-8 film	
Disenchantment of the Statue	1987	9:37	Betamax	
Fire Sermon	1988	3:12	Video 8	
Garden at Fringe	1988	1:30	Video 8	
She Moves	1988	3:12	Video 8	
Drained	1988	3:00	Video8 (NTSC)	
TV Game of the Year	1989	9:59	VHS	
Live in the Time of Cholera	1989	4:16	Video 8	
Drained II	1989	5:49	V8	Edited with Betamax
Blue	1989	7:58	V8	Edited with Betamax
Diversion	1990	5:40	VHS	
Here's Looking At You, Kid!	1990	9:23		In collaboration with Wong Chi-fai and Yau Ching.
Video is a Hole	1990	5:00	Video 8	
Alice doesn’t live here anymore	1990		Video Installation	
Song of the Goddess	1992	6:39	Hi-8	
Video Vogue	1992		Video Installation	
Bik Lai Chu	1993		Video Installation	
Drained III	1995		Video Installation	
Drained IV	1996		Video Installation	
I can only tell it to strangers	1996		Video Installation	
The Great Movement	1996		Video Installation & Performation	The video work of this video-installation being re-made in 2016
Movement#1/10	1996	5:44	Hi-8	Edited with SVHS
Video Circle: Recycling Opera	1996		Video Installation	Video Circle is an installation with 32 televisions, conceived by Danny Yung.
The Great Movement: Red Stock	1997		Video Installation	
Expiration	1997-2000	5:10	DV	
Sweetness	1998		Video Installation	
Recycling Cinema	1999	12:00	DV	
Recycling Cinema	2000	8:00	DV + Video Installation	
For Some Reasons	2003	10:51	DV	
Not Yet	2004	10:00	Video Installation	
Fanfare for the Common Man	2010	4:02	DV	
For Some Blues	2015	2:30	DV	
The Spectre of the Will	2019			
The Spectre of the Real	2019			

== Publications ==
1. Elaine W. NG(伍穎瑜): dye-a-di-a-logue with Ellen Pau. Monographs in Contemporary Art Books. 2004. ISBN 0975335405.
2. SING Song-yong(孫松榮), 'Delayed Plasticity: A Preliminary Investigation of the Political Criticism of Sinophone Single-Channel Video Art in the 1980s,' Journal of Taipei Fine Arts Museum, 34 (Nov 2017), 65–90. (in Chinese)
3. Linda Lai (2015), 'Video Art in Hong Kong: Organologic Sketches for a Dispersive History', in Hong Kong Visual Arts Yearbook 2014, Hong Kong: Department of Fine Arts, The Chinese University of Hong Kong, 15–54.
4. Alice Jim, ‘Screen Structures: Overview of Media Art Development in Hong Kong.’ Hong Kong Visual Arts Yearbook 2003 (1), Hong Kong: Department of Fine Arts, The Chinese University of Hong Kong, 2004, 150–58.
5. Ellen Pau, "Development of Hong Kong Video Art." VTEXT, June 1997, p. 54 -57.
