= Cattle Depot Artist Village =

Village for artists in Hong Kong

Coordinates: 22.32077°N 114.19133°E

- Traditional Chinese: 牛棚藝術村
Transcriptions
Yue: Cantonese
- Yale Romanization: Ngàuh pàahng ngaih seuht chyūn
- Jyutping: Ngaau^{4} paang^{4} ngai^{6} seot^{6} cyun^{1}

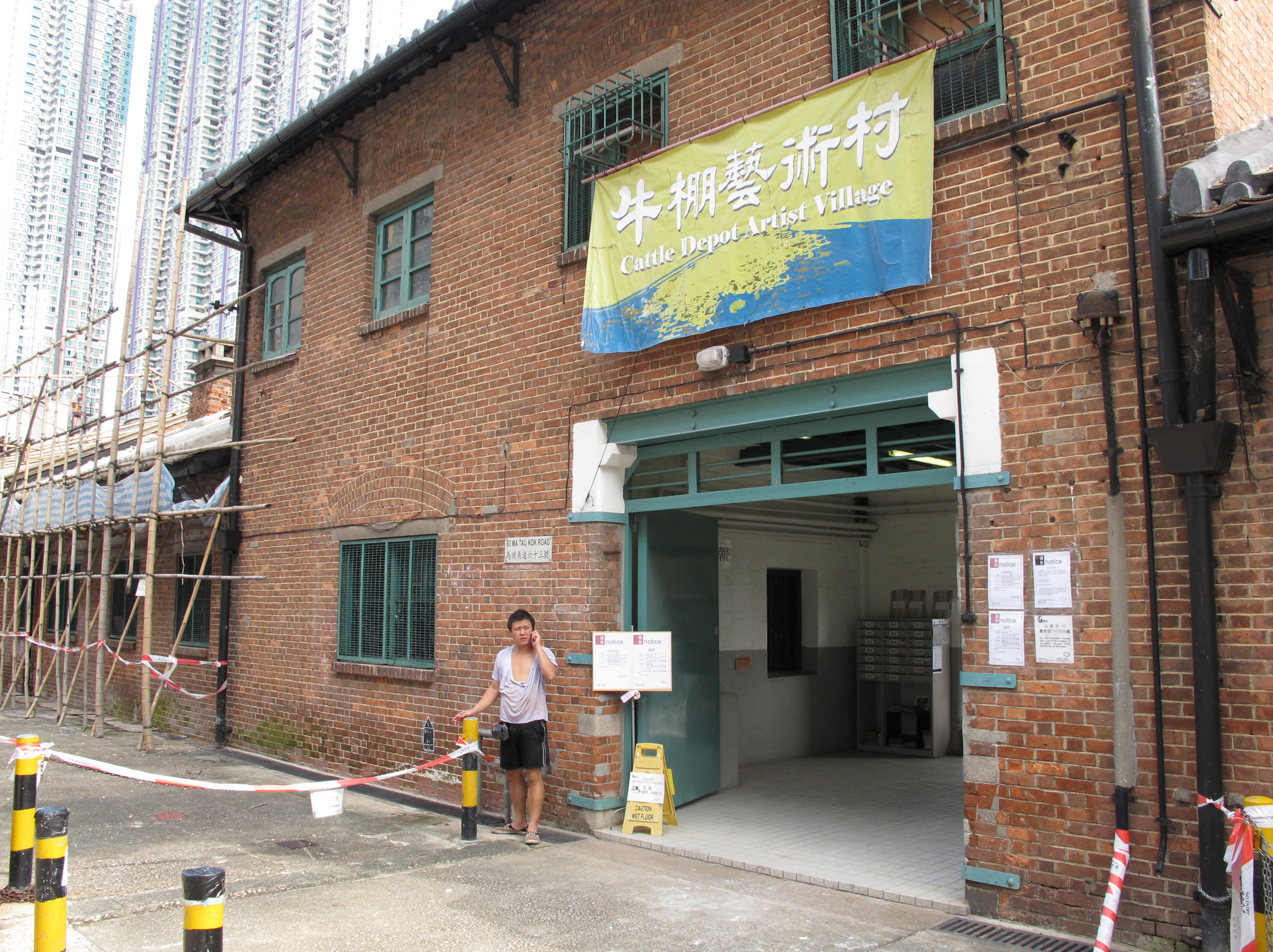
Entrance of the Cattle Depot Artist Village

Cattle Depot Artist Village is located on 63 Ma Tau Kok Road, Ma Tau Kok, Kowloon, Hong Kong. The site was originally used as a slaughterhouse from 1908 to 1999. It was renovated and developed into a village for artists in 2001. It is now home to around 20 art groups.

== History ==
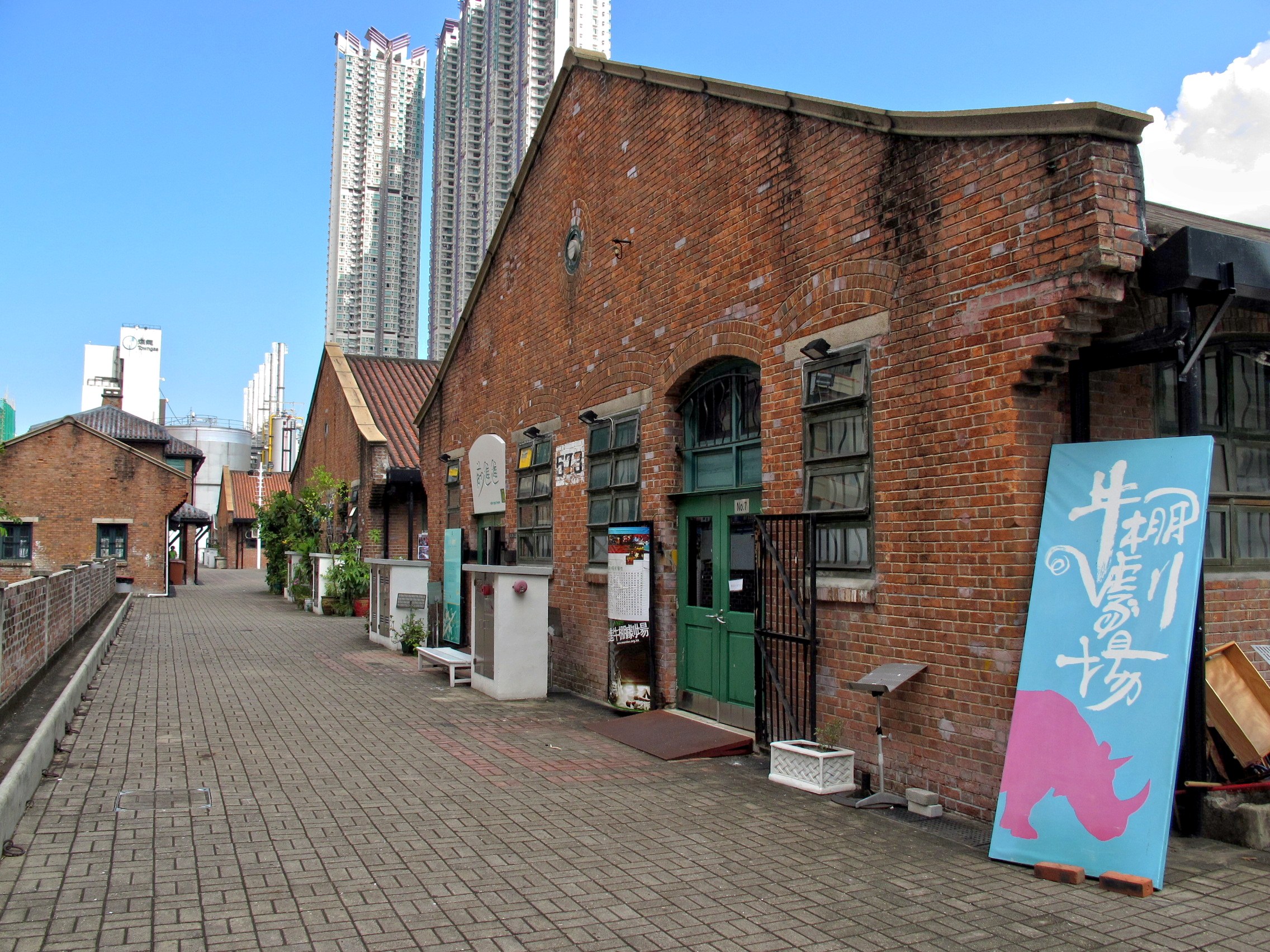

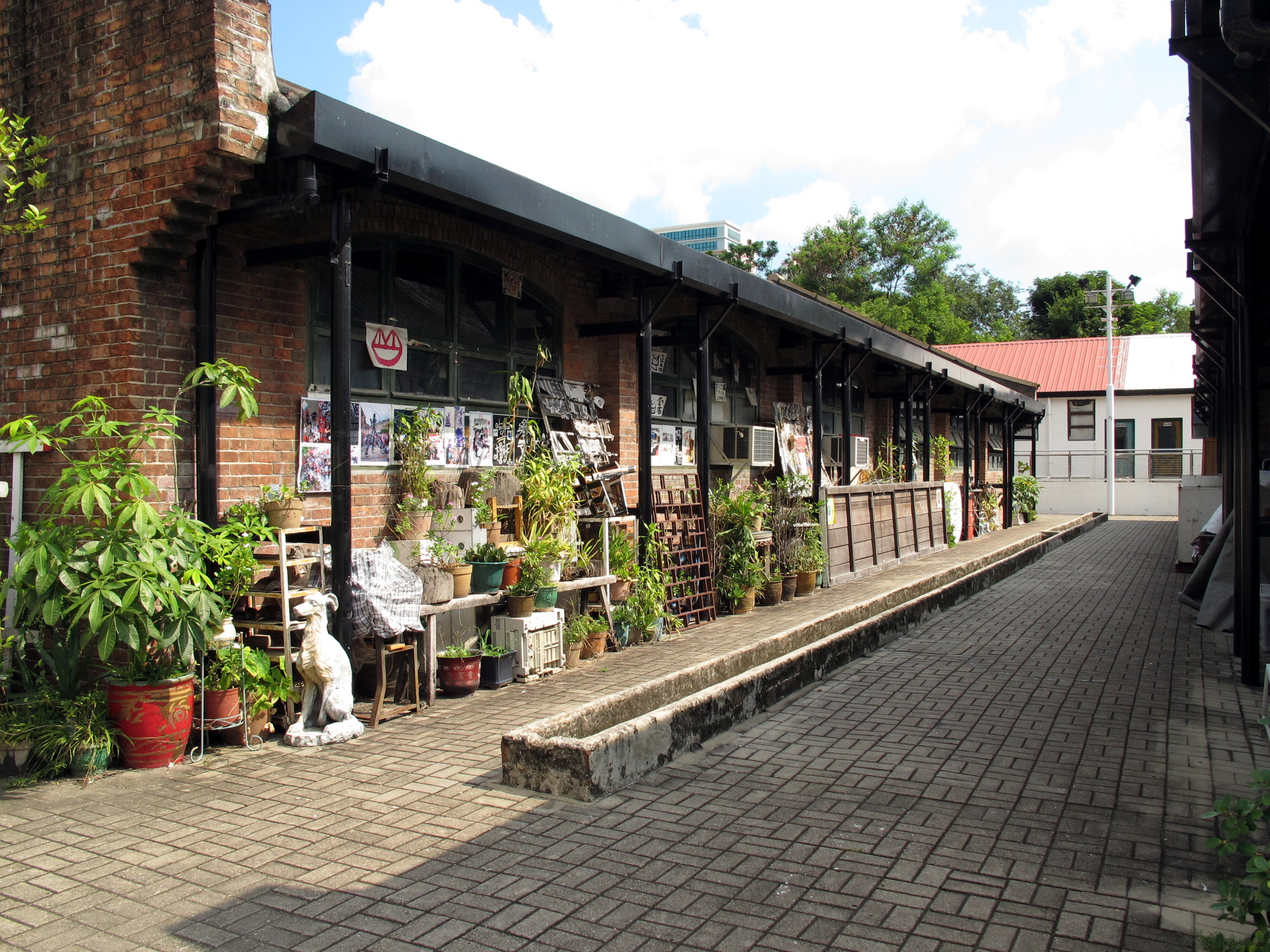

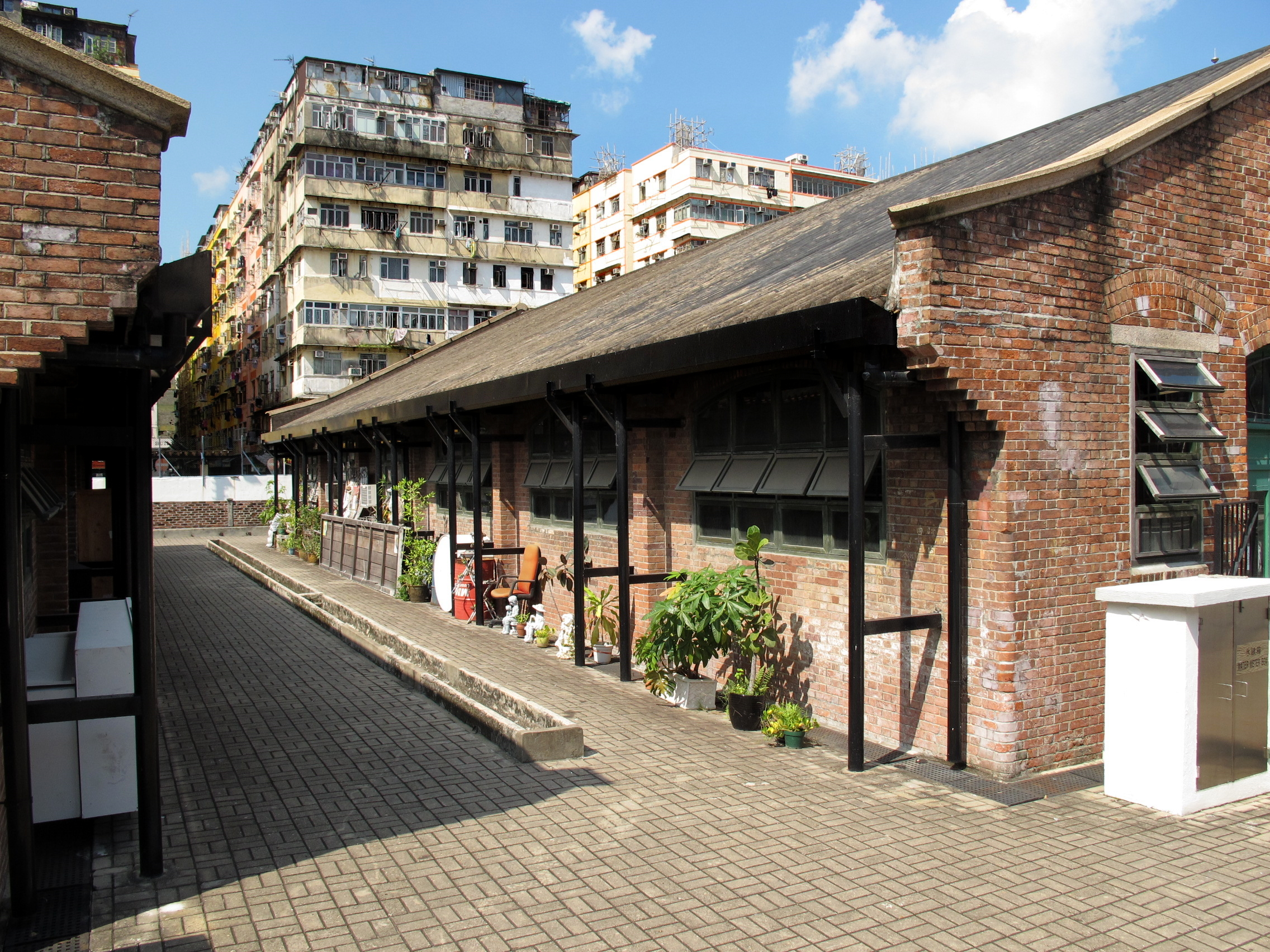

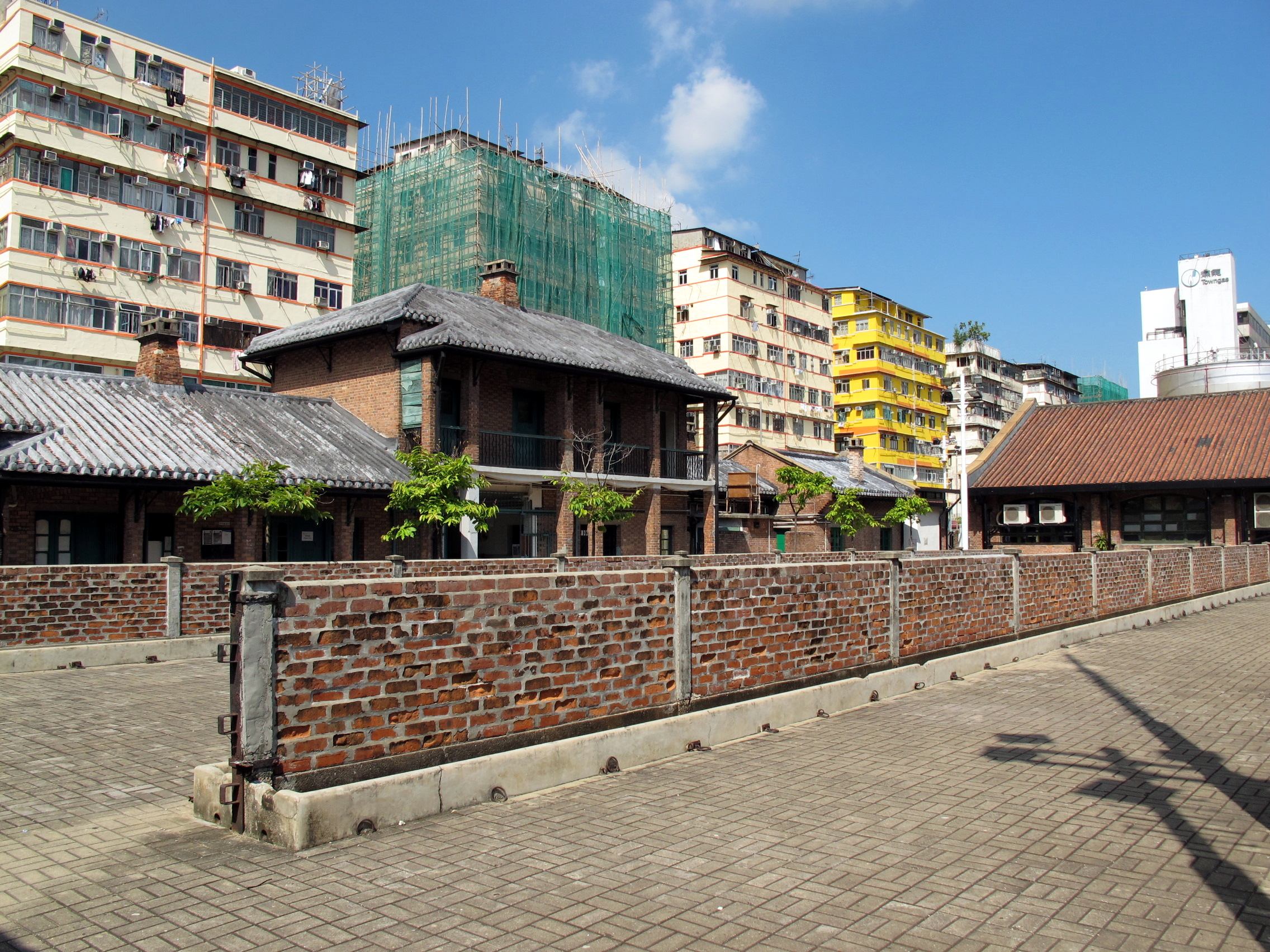

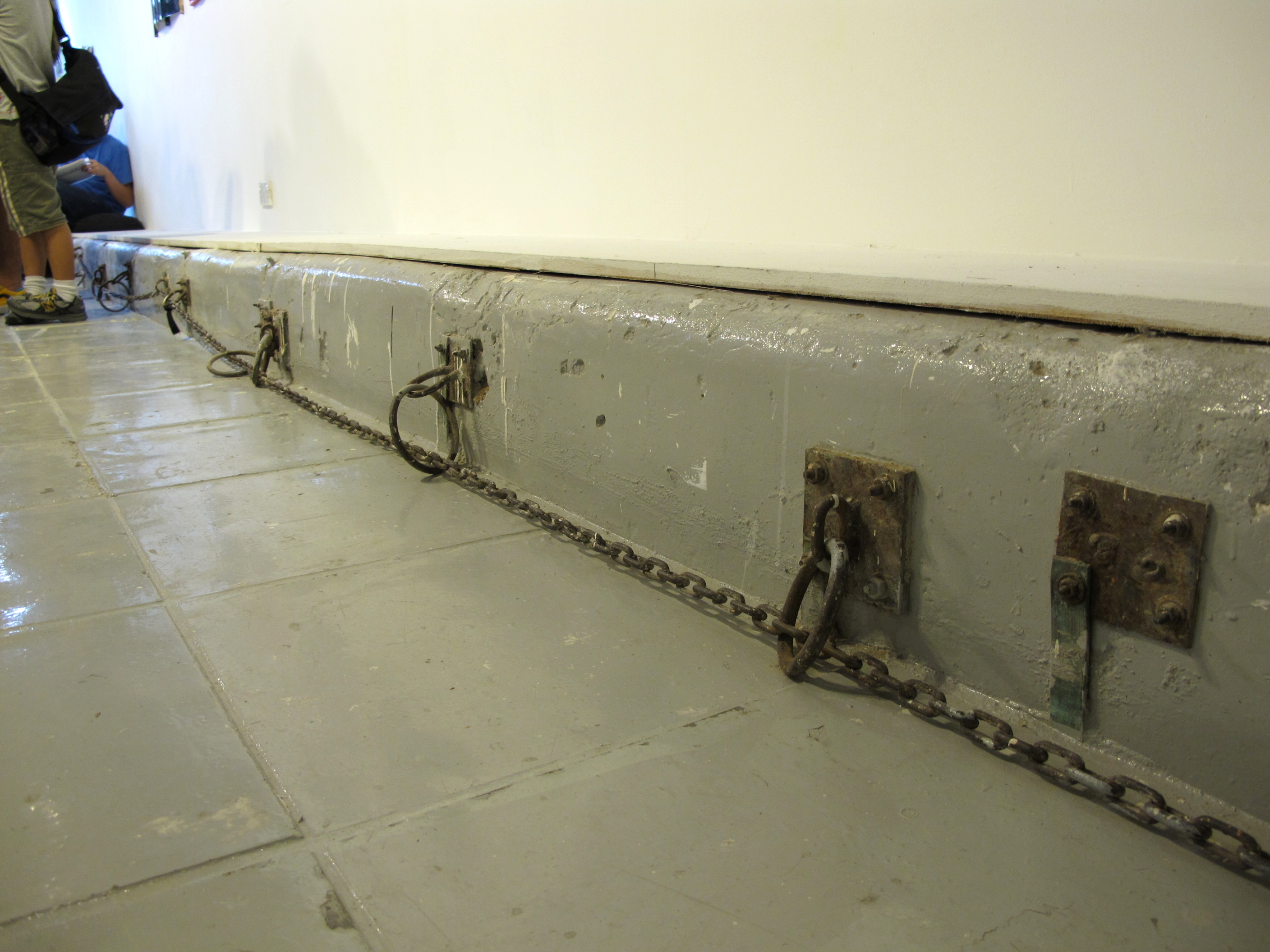

The slaughterhouse was originally located in Hung Hom, occupying 1.7 acres (0.69 ha) which could hold 120 head of cattle, 200 lambs and 400 pigs. It was moved to Ma Tau Kok near To Kwa Wan due to the construction of Kowloon–Canton Railway. The former Ma Tau Kok Quarantine Depot (馬頭角牛畜檢疫站, colloquially known as 馬頭角牛房) was built in 1908. It was owned by the government and was used as a cattle quarantine and slaughter centre for more than 90 years. Central planning and development occurred throughout the years and people started to reside at Ma Tau Kok. In 1999, the old Ma Tau Kok Cattle Depot was finally closed down due to expressed concerns by the neighbouring residents about hygiene problems deriving from a slaughterhouse in the urban area. It was replaced by a new slaughterhouse in Sheung Shui.

== Architecture ==
Built in 1907–08, elements of Western architecture are found. The site was made up of 5 blocks of distinctive red-brick buildings, offering a total space of 15,000 square metres (160,000 ft^{2}). It has pointed roof with tiles. It is the only remaining cattle depot in Hong Kong built before World War I. Listed as a Grade III historical site in 1994, it was upgraded to Grade II in 2009.

== Present use ==
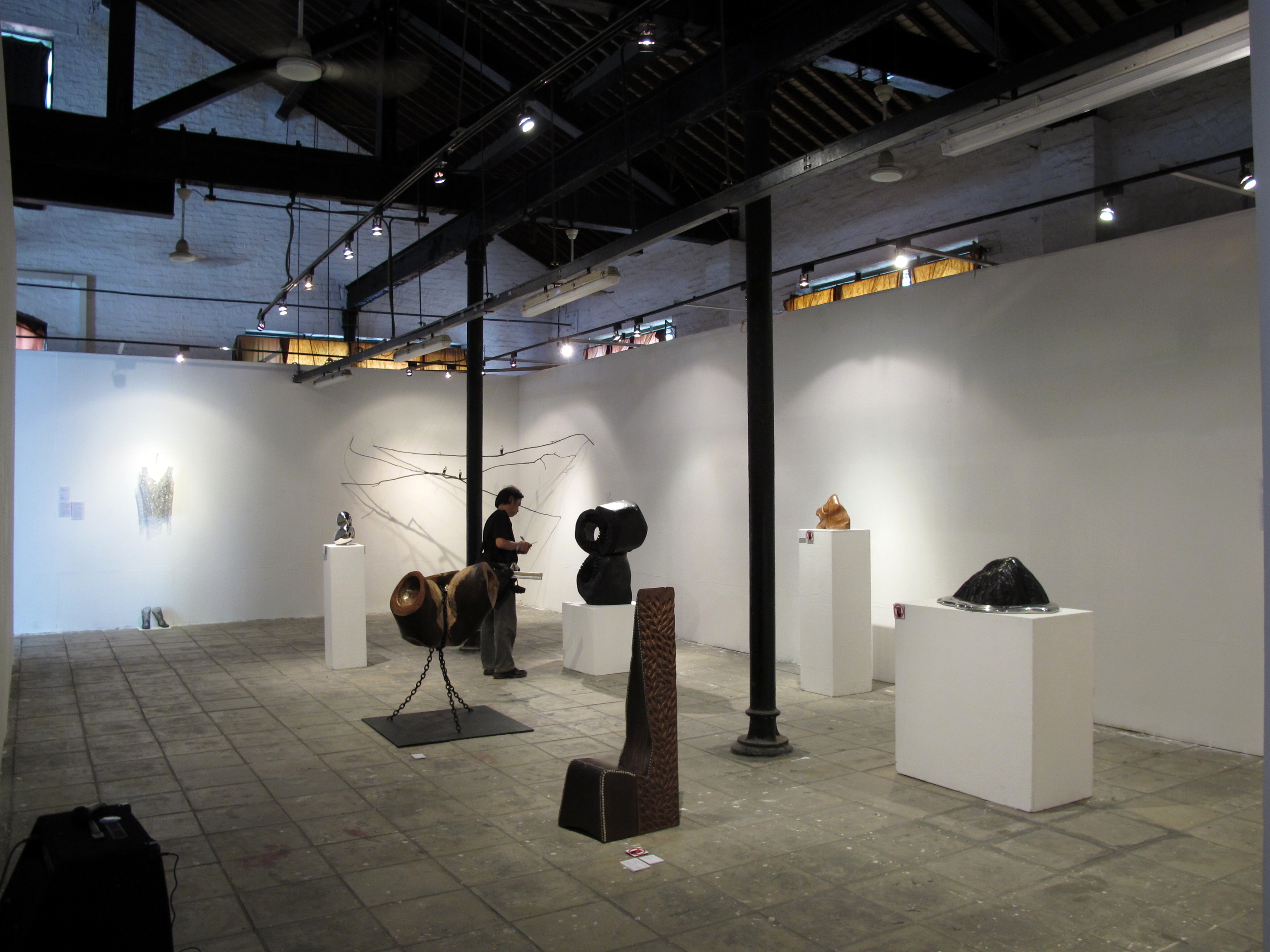
Exhibition inside the village

The old cattle depot was renovated and developed into the present village in 2001 for an artist community originally occupying the former Government Supplies Department Headquarters at Oil Street, North Point. They were temporarily relocated to the Cheung Sha Wan Abattoir and the site of the former airport at Kai Tak as well as assorted factory buildings during the works.

As most of the tenants contribute in art work in the Cattle Depot, the place is then named Cattle Depot Artist Village. Originally, the village is leased for non- residential use. Tenants are not bound to have artistic use in the village. There are a total of 20 units for rental purposes. Now there are 5 artist groups and 9 independent artist units working in the village. Tenants can do their art work and stay in the village as their offices. They can have rehearsals, and performances open the public. Now the village is not all open for the public. 5 units remain vacant. As most of the vacant units need massive repair, they will remain closed and are not rented out. Government Property Agency is responsible for monitoring and collecting rents. The rent is $3.5 per square foot. Leases used to last 3 years in the past. After 2004, leases should be renewed every 3 months. The village is open from 10a.m. to 8 p.m. for the tenants. But is not open to the public

As the Cattle Depot now lacks fire safety installations, lighting, emergency access and hygiene facilities which are required for large-scale public activities according to the regulations of Public Entertainment License, the Cattle Depot is not completely opened to public visitors.

== Types of art ==
Cattle Depot Artist Village hold different functions related to art. In 2003, there was Cattle Depot Festival. In recent years, the Cattle Depot Book Fair is held annually. The village arouses people's interest in knowing the artistic development in Hong Kong. There is also discussion on what should be done by the Hong Kong government to preserve cultures in art.

Activities held in Cattle Depot Theatre (牛棚劇場) include:

- Drama
- Concert
- Small-scale fashion show
- Movie-showing
- Seminar
- Workshop
- Rehearsal

Other activities at Cattle Depot Artist Village include:

- Book fair
- Art festival

== Management ==
The Cattle Depot is currently managed by Hong Kong's Government Property Agency, which had authorized Guardian Property Management Limited (one of their four property management contractors) to provide management services to the Cattle Depot (Ex-Ma Tau Kok Animal Quarantine Depot) regarding specific regulations in the contract with contract no. PMA / KLN / 2007.

== Revitalisation ==
The Commissioner for Heritage's Office (CHO) under the Development Bureau was set up on 25 April 2008 with a purpose to support the implementation of the heritage conservation policy being addressed by the Chief Executive. The Government launched the Revitalising Historic Buildings Through Partnership Scheme in 2008. Although the Cattle Depot is not included in the scheme, the CHO has been planning to revitalise the Cattle Depot during 2009.

The Development Bureau has appointed the Hong Kong Arts Development Council to carry out a study concerning the future development of the Cattle Depot. The study will evaluate the background and current situation of the Cattle Depot as a role of artist village as well as the feasibility of operating artist village in the Cattle Depot referring to the history of local and foreign artist villages. In addition, the study will also suggest how the revitalisation of the Cattle Depot can have a synergetic effect on the surrounding areas including Kai Tak new development area and the old quarters in To Kwa Wan like the 13 Streets, with an investigation on the antiquities value of Kowloon City, the impact on the whole district and the possibility of exploiting a heritage trail/network. The Development Bureau is still consulting the public in terms of the conservation method and future revitalisation of Cattle Depot.

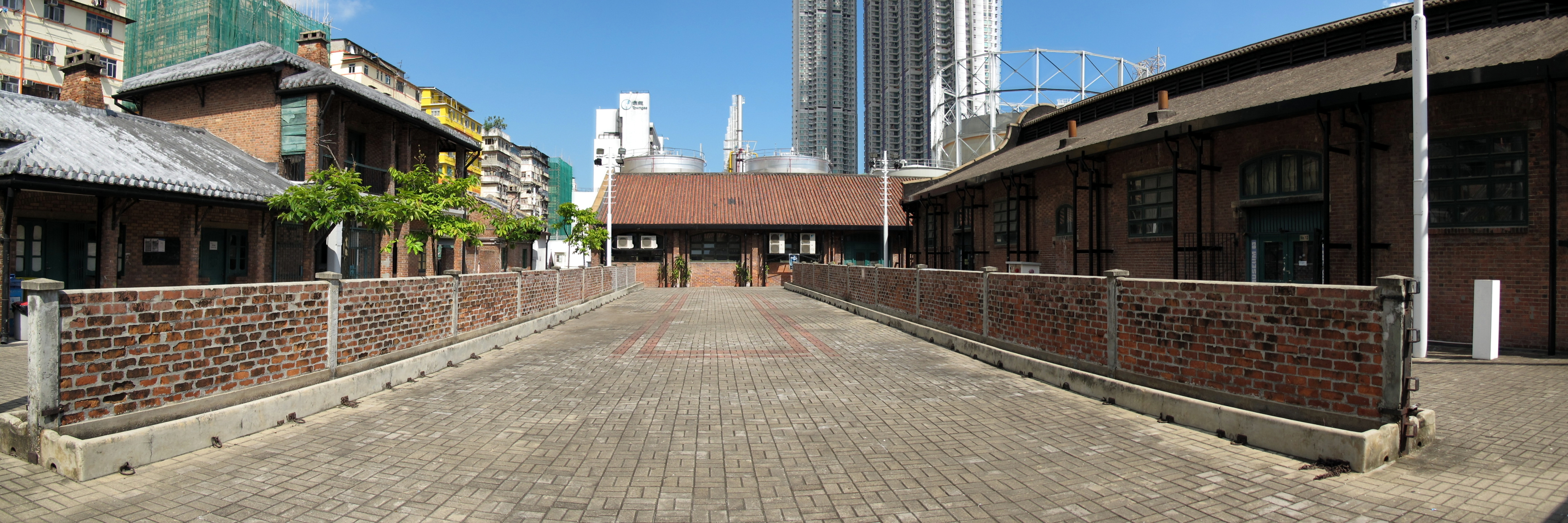
Inside the Cattle Depot Artist Village

== Constraints faced by artists ==
Due to the Cattle Depot being listed as a historical building, there are regulations placed on resident artists. Artists are requested by the Government Property Agency to comply with various rules which may potentially inhibit the promotion of an artistic atmosphere within the Village. Artists are not allowed to paint on the walls of their own studios. Taking photographs is also not allowed. Artists are prohibited from putting plants or even their own works outside their studios. They cannot stay overnight in their studios. Corridors are labelled as public space and art groups cannot conduct rehearsals along those pathways. Previously there was a stringent rule of checking visitors' HKID cards before they could enter Cattle Depot, but this has been relaxed.

A Temporary Place of Public Entertainment Licence is needed for the temporary use of the units to organize public functions. In response to artists' concerns that the rigid regulations may complicate the maintenance of an artistic atmosphere, the government stated that a licence is needed because the premises are not well-equipped with fire safety and emergency access facilities.

== Comparison with the Fo Tan Arts Studio ==
Young artists, e.g. arts graduates, in their twenties are renting studios in Fo Tan while large art groups and cultural bodies like Zuni Icosahedron, Artist Commune, Videotage, 1a Space and On & On Theatre Workshop Company are based in the Cattle Depot Artist Village. At Fo Tan, artists are generally more scattered, individualistic and reluctant to be labelled, while artists in the Village tend to be more organised, forming an aggregate body. They described themselves as simply a group of studios but the sense of community is already strong enough for them to hold an open studio each year. Young artists are attracted to the low rents of the Fo Tan site. It is also conveniently just one MTR stop from the Chinese University of Hong Kong, from which many of these art graduates hail.

Cattle Depot has its own distinctiveness. Artists enjoy studios set in a quirky cultural heritage site. This is akin to the environment in some other countries where sites of historical value are reused. A visit to Fo Tan studios involves much climbing of stairs. It is rather inconvenient when compared to Cattle Depot where the red-brick houses are horizontally laid and people can get into the studios easily. Also, unlike studios located inside factory buildings, the doors are not necessarily closed all the time at Cattle Depot, there are more interactions and scope for creativity. Moreover, Cattle Depot offers convenient access to nearby residential communities, it can take up the role of introducing developments in art to the public easily.

Despite limited government promotion of Cattle Depot as a village for local artists, it is already known overseas. Journalists from China and Japan have come to report about Cattle Depot. This shows that Cattle Depot has good potential to be turned into a special and distinctive spot if there are good development opportunities.

== Possible developments ==
=== Expanding the artists' village ===
The Development Bureau and Hong Kong Arts Development Council, together with a relevant research centre responsible for architectural cultural heritage of the Chinese University of Hong Kong are investigating into the possibility of expanding art and cultural development from Cattle Depot Artist Village into the neighbourhood including the 13 Streets. The Development Bureau intends to seek the property management powers from the Government Property Agency, which is currently responsible for the management of the Cattle Depot.

The idea is to develop Cattle Depot Artist Village together with the 13 Streets which is right opposite to it. The government would like to expand the area of the artists village into the old buildings on the 13 Streets such that part of the flats in those buildings can be rented to artists as their residence. It is envisaged that it would be very convenient for artists as they will then be living at flats nearby. It is within walking distance that they get back to their studios to continue with their work. Moreover, if the entire floor of a particular block is rented to artists, surely artists will have more opportunities for interactions, exchanging ideas about art. This helps to create an artistic atmosphere within the neighbourhood.

It is also suggested that the roofs of those old buildings in 13 Streets can be used as exhibition areas by the artists to hold art exhibitions. The problem, however, is that there are a number of illegal structures on those roofs at present. Although the residents have been requested by the government to remove those illegal structures, this may still prove to be difficult given that they still have to pay a sum after receiving government subsidies for renovation purposes. Renovation of the roofs is expected to take quite a long time before the roofs can be used as sites for art exhibitions.

=== Expanding the scope ===
The Arts Development Council expressed the view that Cattle Depot may be better managed in the future. At present, some artists use it as store room, plant flowers on the site and do not pay any rent. The Council felt that the site has not been put into good use. In Hong Kong, the public has always argued that there is not enough venues and working space for local art groups. Since Cattle Depot is a very spacious site, it is very suitable for the performing arts. The Council wants to make best use of the site. The idea came up after the announcement of plans to turn a nine-storey government factory building in Shek Kip Mei into a centre for visual arts. Other related developments includes the establishment of the Jockey Club Creative Arts Centre, which offers 100 studios to artists and arts groups for rents of HK$3–8/sqft.

== Creative industries in Hong Kong ==
Creative industries in are divided into 11 categories: design, architecture, advertising, publishing, music, film, computer software, digital entertainment, performing arts, broadcasting, and antiques and art dealing. Some fall under the core industries, such as tourism. In Hong Kong Policy address 2005, it was mentioned that creative industries can be extended to cover areas such as community building and the creation of an urban image. In this new competitive era of globalization, adding value to products and services through design, packaging, image building and advertising serves to consolidate and realize the intangible values of culture. Strictly speaking, in Hong Kong, creative industries can be defined as "cultural and creative industries". This term clearly specifies the direction of development of creative industries. Hong Kong has around 32,000 creative industry-related establishments, with more than 170,000 practitioners. The industry creates an added value to Hong Kong’s GDP of more than $60 billion annually. This constitutes around 4% of the GDP.

It seems the government's attitude towards creative industries is very supportive. However, there are still many constraints in its development. The case of Cattle Depot can serve as an example. The government refused the long-term lease of Cattle Depot Artist Village. The lease has to be renewed every 3 months. Though the village is leased, it is still categorized as government property. Visitors cannot enter the village without permission. People who wish to enter the village need to show their HKID card for registration. This creates much inconvenience to the visitors. And the keeper of the village actually does not allow them to use the name of "Cattle Depot Artist Village". Banners are not allowed to be hung up under this name. Cultural development needs space and time. Hong Kong government has been promoting creative industry for years, but they neglect the local artistic atmosphere and the effort made by the art organizations/ artists, not to mention appreciating and supporting its development. The lack of long-term vision and supportive cultural development by the government creates much uncertainty to the contemporary art development. This is because the importance of coherence of artistic atmosphere is still in the blind-spot of government cultural development policy. Under the influence of financial turmoil, nations are undergoing economic recession. In the coming years, the creative industry of Western countries will certainly be affected. Although Hong Kong's creative industry still falls behind when compared with its counterparts, Hong Kong should make use of this period to catch up. More investment and cultivation of talented people will equip Hong Kong with the diversity and long-term creative industry development.

== See also ==
- Smithfield, Hong Kong, historical location of another cattle depot in Hong Kong
- Jockey Club Creative Arts Centre
