= KMB Route 1A =

Bus route in Kowloon, Hong Kong

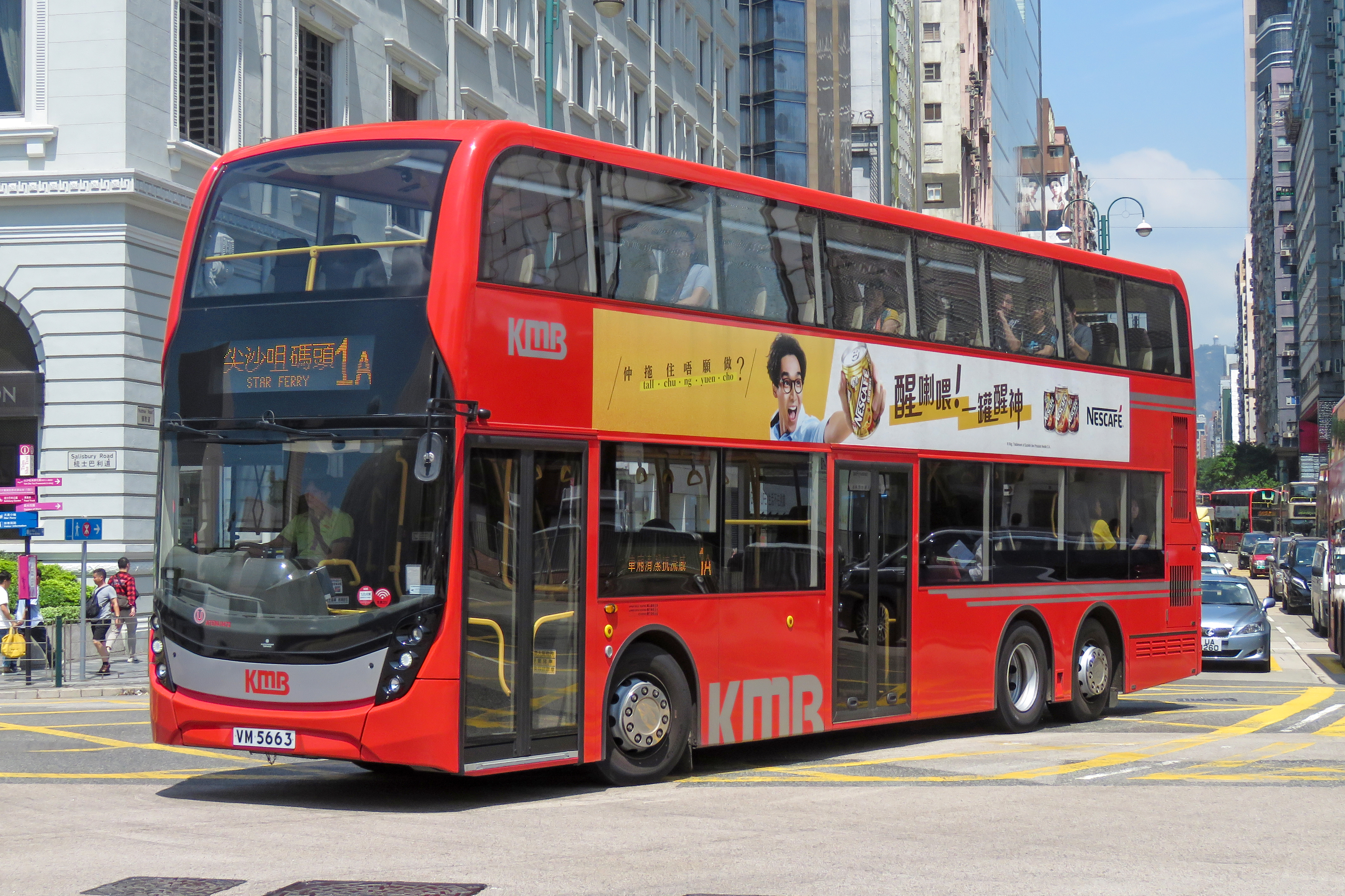

Overview
- Operator: Kowloon Motor Bus
- Garage: Kowloon Bay depot
- Vehicle: Alexander Dennis Enviro500 MMC; Volvo B9TL

Route
- Start: Star Ferry
- Via: Prince Edward Road, Boundary Street (eastbound), Kwun Tong Road
- End: Sau Mau Ping (Central)
- Length: 14.8 km
- Other routes: KMB Route N216, N293; Red minibus
- Competition: KMB Routes 9, 13D, 13X, 14X, 16, 93K, 95, 203E, 213D, 213X, 215X; Citybus Route 20A (Nathan Road to Boundary Street/ Prince Edward Road West to Nathan Road); Routes via Nathan Road; MTR; Mong Kok ←→ Kwun Tong Red Minibus

Service
- Level: 0600-0050
- Alt. level: 0530-2340
- Frequency: 5 - 10 mins.
- Journey time: 84 mins.

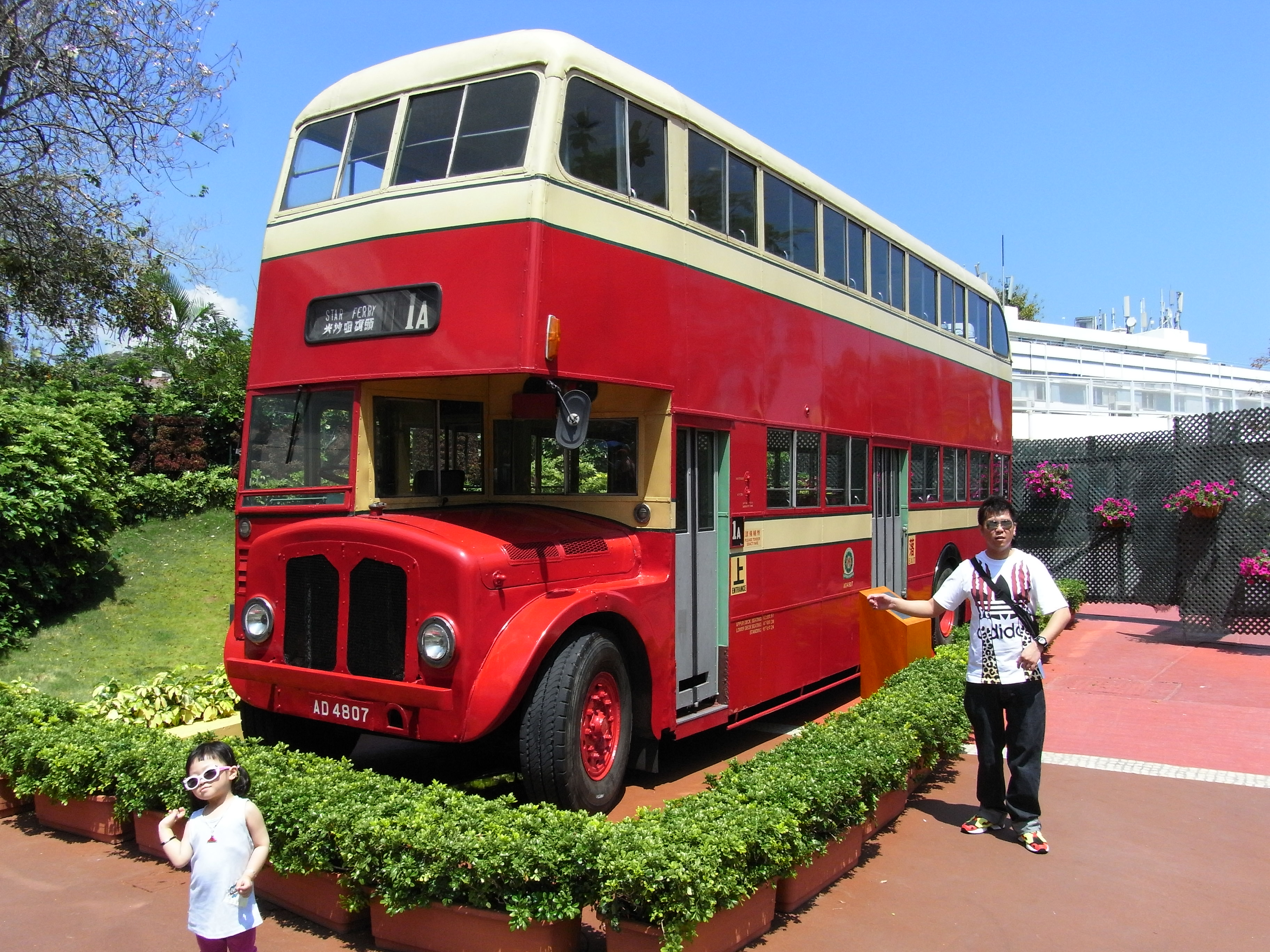
Preserved AEC Regent V bus with Route 1A signboard

KMB Route 1A is a bus route operated by Kowloon Motor Bus (KMB) in Hong Kong. It runs between Star Ferry and Sau Mau Ping (Central) and provides air-conditioned service. The route runs via Tsim Sha Tsui, Yau Ma Tei, Mong Kok, Kowloon City, San Po Kong, Ngau Tau Kok, Kwun Tong, and Sau Mau Ping.

This route holds the record for the longest time of running a mix of non-air-conditioned and air-conditioned buses, from 1991 to 2012, this despite it being one of the earliest routes to introduce air-conditioned bus service.

== History ==
- 4 June 1968: Route introduced with the terminus at Yue Man Square, replaces first generation Route 2B.
- 15 September 1971: Route extended to Sau Mau Ping (Central)..
- 10 February 1991: Ten air-conditioned buses introduced to the route.
- 7 May, 2012: Converted into a fully air-conditioned bus service.

== Bus route information ==
- This route goes past Yau Ma Tei, Mong Kok, Ho Man Tin, Ma Tau Wai, Kowloon Bay, Ngau Tau Kok and Kwun Tong.
- The districts this route goes past is Yau Tsim Mong District, Kowloon City District, Wong Tai Sin District and Kwun Tong District.
- Nathan Road, Prince Edward Road West, Prince Edward Road East, Boundary Street (Eastbound only) and Kwun Tong Road are major roads that this bus route goes past.

=== Sau Mau Ping (Central) to Star Ferry ===
- Sau Mau Ping (Central)
- Sau On House
- Sau Ming House
- Leung Shek Chee College
- Hiu Lai Court
- Cheung Wo Court
- Wo Lok Estate
- Yue Man Square
- Millennium City
- Ting Fu Street, Kwun Tong
- Lower Ngau Tau Kok Estate
- Telford Gardens
- Kowloon Bay Railway Station
- Kai Yip Estate
- Richland Gardens
- Rhythm Garden
- The Latitude
- Regal Oriental Hotel
- Hau Wong Road
- La Salle Road
- Earl Street
- Knight Street
- Diocesan Boys' School
- Heep Wo Primary School
- Prince Edward Railway Station
- Nelson Street, Mong Kok
- Soy Street, Mong Kok
- Wing Sing Lane, Yau Ma Tei
- Cheong Lok Street, Yau Ma Tei
- Tak Shing Street, Tsim Sha Tsui
- Cameron Road
- Middle Road, Tsim Sha Tsui
- Hong Kong Cultural Centre
- Star Ferry

=== Star Ferry to Sau Mau Ping (Central) ===
- Star Ferry
- Middle Road, Tsim Sha Tsui
- Kimberley Road
- Bowring Street, Yau Ma Tei
- Kowloon Central Post Office
- Man Ming Lane, Yau Ma Tei
- Changsha Street, Mong Kok
- Nelson Street, Mong Kok
- HK & KLN Chiu Chow School
- Queen Elizabeth School
- Prince Edward Railway Station
- Fa Hui Park
- Caritas Lodge
- Beverly Villas
- St Teresa's Hospital
- Hau Wong Road
- Regal Oriental Hotel
- The Latitude
- Rhythm Garden
- Ping Shek Estate
- Kai Yip Estate
- Kowloon Bay Railway Station
- Lower Ngau Tau Kok Estate
- Kwun Tong Road Sitting-Out Area
- Millennium City
- Kwun Tong Town Centre
- Wo Lok Estate
- Sau Nga Road Playground
- Hiu Lai Court
- Hiu Kwong Street Recreational Ground
- Leung Shek Chee College
- Sau Fu House
- Sau Mau Ping (Central)

== See also ==
- 1a space, an independent art space named after the route
