= Cheung Sha Wan Abattoir =

Former slaughterhouse in Cheung Sha Wan, Hong Kong

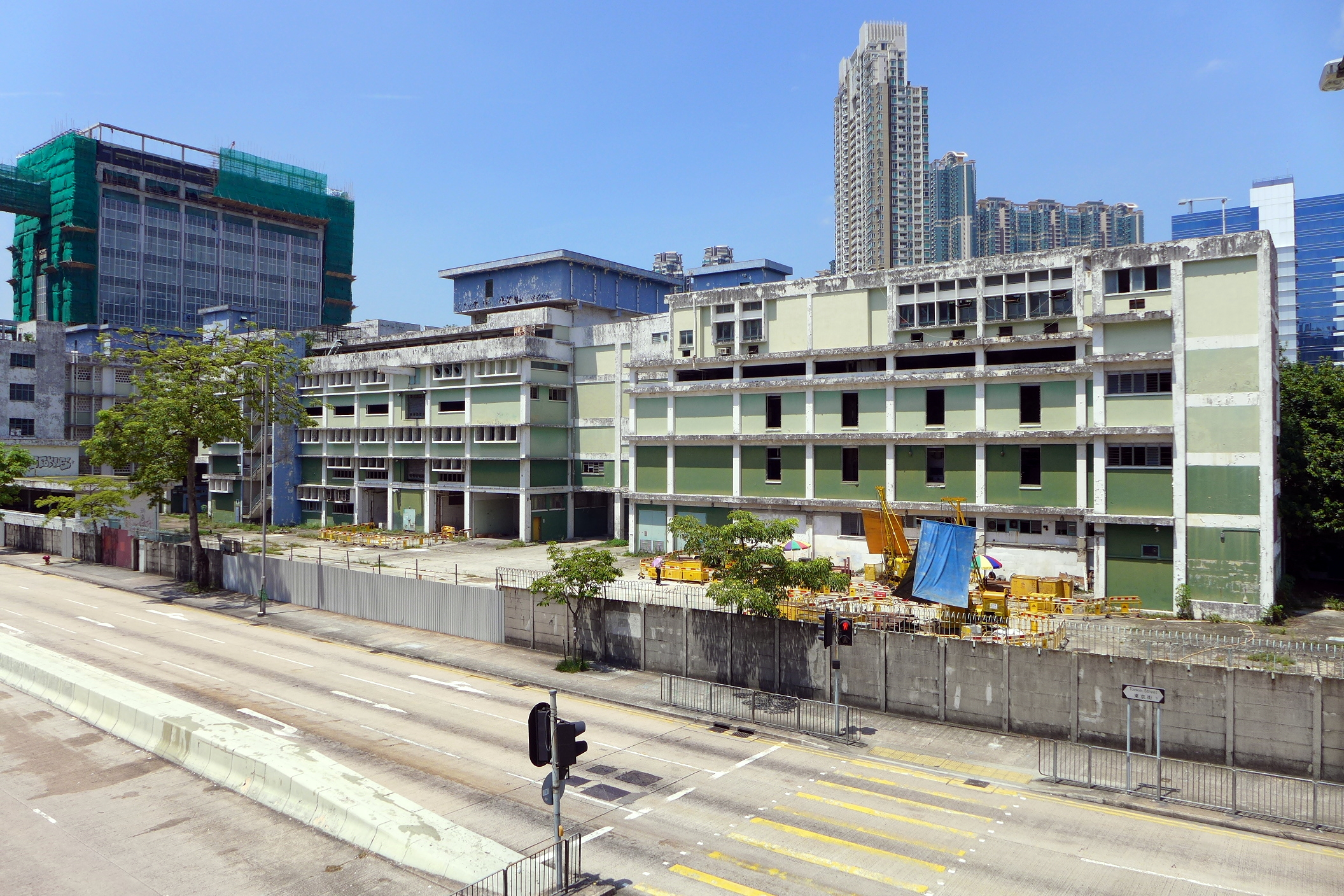
Cheung Sha Wan Abattoir in 2015.

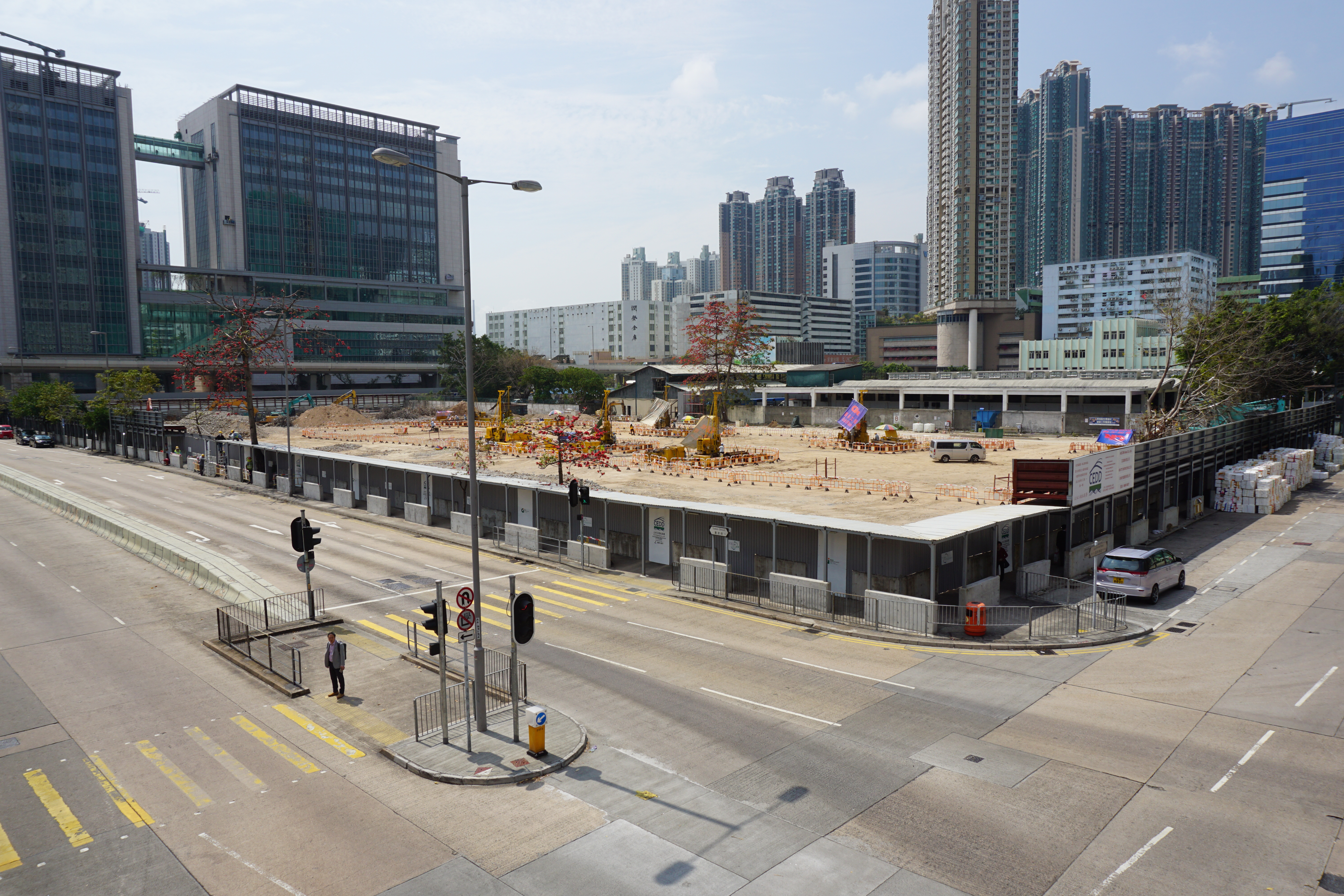
Site of Cheung Sha Wan Abattoir in 2018 after demolition.

Cheung Sha Wan Abattoir (長沙灣屠場; Cantonese Yale: chèuhng shā wàahn tòuh chèuhng) is a former slaughterhouse in Cheung Sha Wan, in the Sham Shui Po District of Hong Kong.

It was closed in 1999.

Cheung Sha Wan Abattoir, together with the slaughterhouses in Kennedy Town‌‌ and Yuen Long were closed for economic reasons as well as their proximity to urban areas. They were replaced by Sheung Shui Slaughterhouse.
