= Zuni Icosahedron =

Theater company

Zuni Icosahedron is a Hong Kong–based international experimental theatre company. Founded in 1982, Zuni is one of the nine major professional performing arts groups subsidised by the HKSAR government and has produced more than 190 original productions of alternative theatre and multimedia performances. As well as theatre works, Zuni is also active in video, sound experimentation and installation art, as well as working in the areas of arts education, arts criticism, cultural policy research and international cultural exchange.

The name Zuni Icosahedron expresses two essential elements of its theatre works: colour (zuni) and form (icosahedron). While "Zuni" stands for a colour between green and blue, "Icosahedron" is a twenty-sided object as well as a highly infectious virus.

Over the years, Zuni has been invited to more than 30 cities in Europe, Asia, and America for cultural exchange and performances. In 2000, Zuni co-presented “Festival of Vision: Berlin / Hong Kong”, the first ever large-scale cultural exchange between Asia and Europe. In 2009, Zuni’s artistic director Danny Yung was awarded the Merit Cross of the Order of Merit by the German Federal Government in recognition of his contribution to arts and cultural exchange between Germany and Hong Kong.

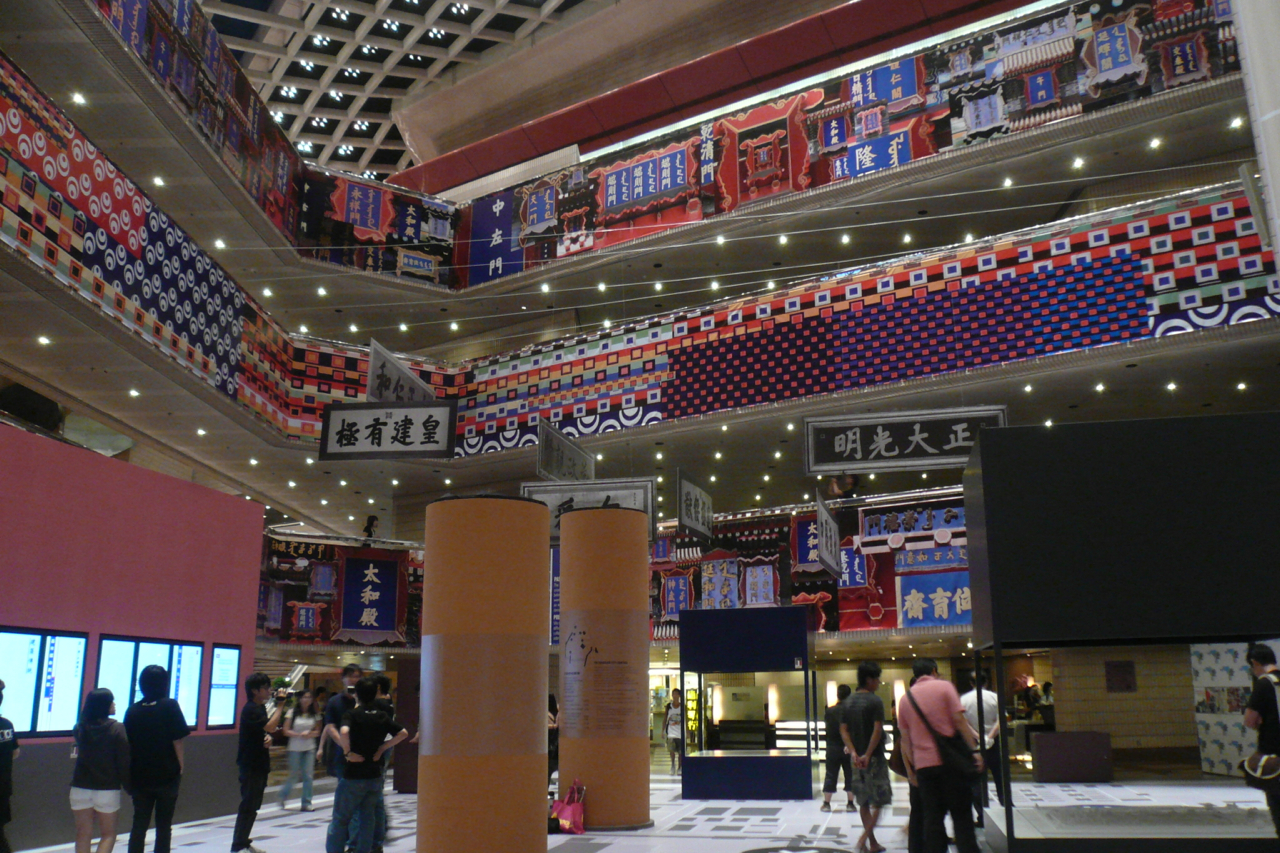
The Forbidden City Exhibition presented and organised by Zuni Icosahedron at the Hong Kong Cultural Centre in 2009, as the kicking-off programme of its venue partnership

Since 2009, Zuni has been a venue partner of the Hong Kong Cultural Centre, producing a series of theatre works and outreach education programmes.

Since 2006, Zuni has been led by its co-artistic directors, Danny Yung and Mathias Woo.

== Major theatre works ==
=== 2010 ===
- Experimenting Traditions Series: Stage Sisters (Director: Danny Yung)
- A Digital Opera in 7 Acts – The Memory Palace of Matteo Ricci (Director: Mathias Woo, Libretto: Diana Liao, Composer: Steve Hui)
- Remembrance of Karaoke Past (Director: Mathias Woo)

=== 2011 ===
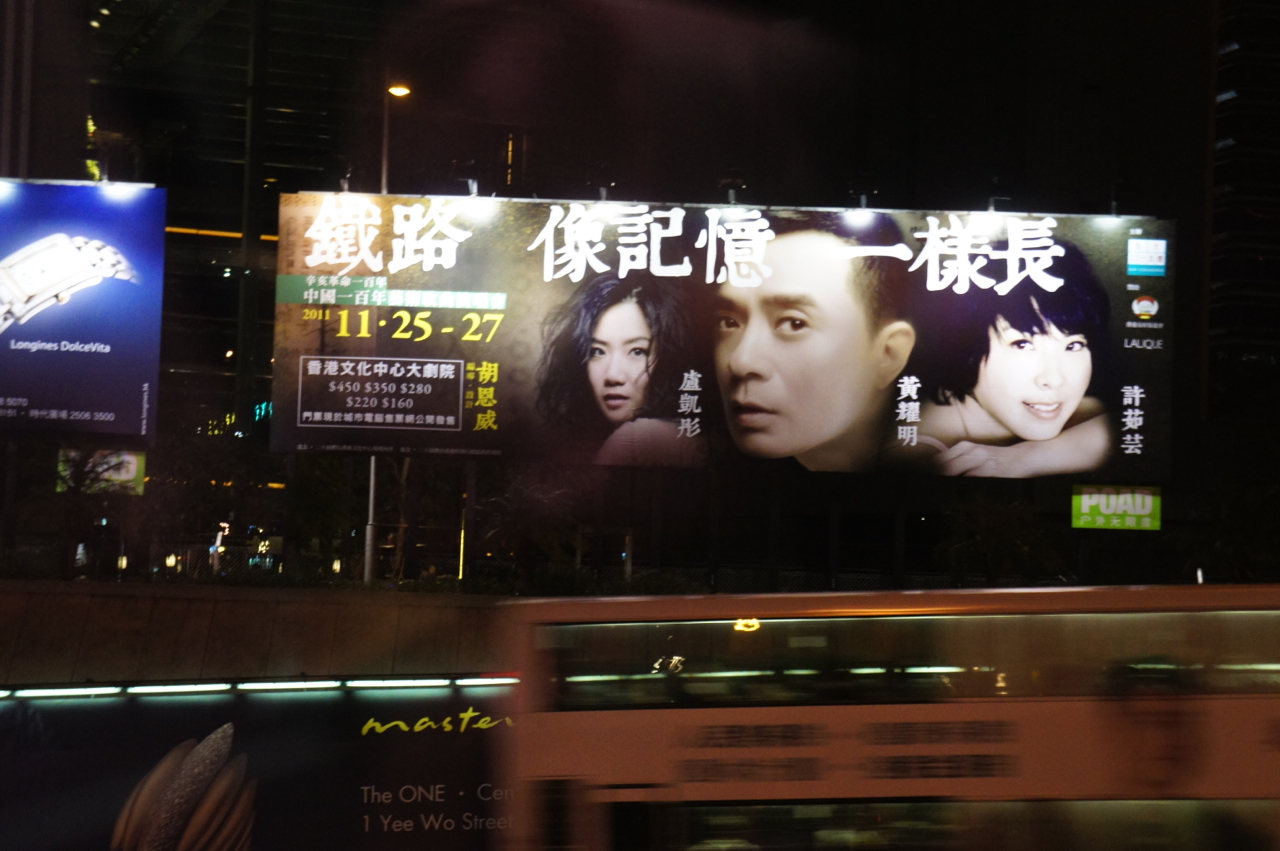
Railway is Like a Long, Winding Recollection, a Zuni Icosahedron's production in 2011 at Hong Kong Cultural Centre

- One Hundred Years of Solitude 10.0 – Cultural Revolution (Director: Danny Yung)
- Railway is Like a Long, Winding Recollection (Director: Mathias Woo)
- One Hundred Years of Chinese Architecture (Director: Mathias Woo)
- B.O.B.* The Final Cut (Choreographer: Dick Wong)
- Bauhaus Manifesto (Directors: Lai Tat Tat Wing, Cedric Chan)

== Art education ==
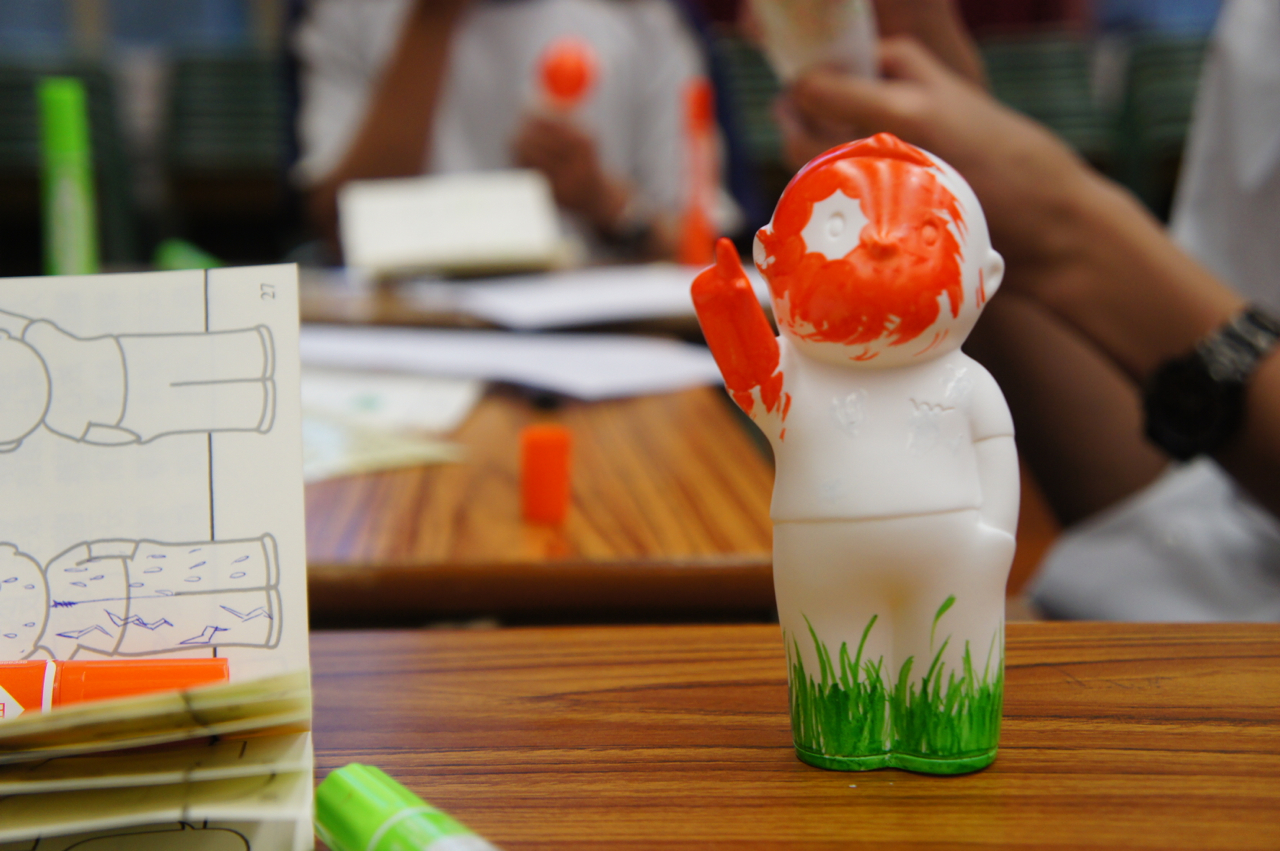
“Tian Tian Xiang Shang” Creativity-For-Community and School Development Programme

Zuni has undertaken outreach to schools and the community by setting up an Art Education Unit since 1987. Over the years, it has designed and organised various creative education projects, including exhibitions, performances, workshops and cultural exchange activities. A notable example is the Black Box Exercise, which started in 1995, in which each participating students is given one 30 cm x 30 cm x 30 cm black box to create their own work. The exercise was brought to Kolkata, Mumbai, and New Delhi in 2005 by the India Foundation for the Arts, and around 8,000 local artists, teachers and students has participated.

In 2012, Zuni launched “Tian Tian Xiang Shang”, a Creativity-For-Community and School Development Programme, which includes a series of sculptures creations, workshops for primary and secondary students and exhibitions.

== Architecture is Art Festival ==
The Architecture is Art Festival (AIAF) is the biannual art festival presented by Zuni Icosahedron since 2009. With architecture as the central topic, a series of multimedia performances, traditional Chinese opera, exhibitions, seminars, conferences and student workshops are held at the Hong Kong Cultural Centre and other venues. As Rossella Ferrari writes in her review in TDR, "(AIAF)...is a celebration of architecture and theatre or, rather, of architecture in theatre and architecture as theatre—the first of its kind in Asia and possibly worldwide."

== Gay-themed film festival ==
In 1985, Zuni held the first homosexual film festival in its clubhouse in Causeway Bay, which was probably the first of its kind in Hong Kong. Films selected included Bigger Splash, Boys in the Band, Querelle, Salò, or the 120 Days of Sodom, and Victor Victoria.

== People ==
Zuni’s experimental spirit has nurtured generations of talent, with many former members now practising in the design industry, popular media and cultural infrastructure in various areas. These people include lyricist Wyman Wong, stage director Edward Lam, comic artist Lai Tat Tat Wing, styling and costume designer Tomas Chan, cinematographer Kwan Pun Leung, choreographer Dick Wong, writer and visual artist Craig Au Yeung, singer Anthony Wong, commentator and cultural critic Leung Man-tao, and film director Susie Au.
