= Hong Kong Arts Development Council =

- 香港藝術發展局

Statutory body overview
- Formed: 1995
- Jurisdiction: Hong Kong
- Headquarters: Tai Koo Quarry Bay Hong Kong Island
- Statutory body executives: Dr Wong Ying-wai, Wilfred, Chairman; Lee Wai-man, Maurice, Vice Chairman
- Key document: Hong Kong Arts Development Council Ordinance, Chapter 472
- Website: www.hkadc.org.hk?lang=en

Hong Kong Arts Development Council
- Traditional Chinese: 香港藝術發展局
- Simplified Chinese: 香港艺术发展局
Transcriptions
Standard Mandarin
- Hanyu Pinyin: Xiānggǎng Yìshù Fāzhǎn Jú
Yue: Cantonese
- Yale Romanization: Hēung góng ngaih seuht faat jín guhk
- Jyutping: Hoeng1 gong2 ngai6 soet6 faat3 zin2 guk6

The Hong Kong Arts Development Council (HKADC) is a statutory body in Hong Kong tasked with development of the arts in the territory.

The HKADC was created in 1995, under the Hong Kong Arts Development Council Ordinance, Chapter 472, replacing the former Council of Performing Arts. It advises the government on cultural policy for Hong Kong and allocates grants, undertakes advocacy, promotion and development, and plans programmes, in support of the arts.

== Governance and administration ==
The administration of the HKADC is overseen by its (up to) 27 members, who are appointed by the Chief Executive of Hong Kong. Of these, 10 are elected by various arts organisations (or groups of organisations), each representing an art form or aspect of art. The Council includes six standing committees: the Arts Promotion Committee, Arts Support Committee, Management Committee, Audit Committee, Review Committee and Strategy Committee, as well as a group for each of the 10 'art-forms'.

Council members are appointed for three-year terms. Members appointed from 1 January 2011 are:

- Wong Ying-wai, Wilfred (Chairman)
- Yan Hau-yee, Lina (Vice-chairman)
- Au Weng-hei, William
- Choi Tsz-kwan
- Chung Shu-kun, Christopher
- James Mathew Fong
- Hung Keung
- Ko Tin-lung
- Lee Kam-yin
- Man Kit-wah, Eva
- Ng Kang-fai
- Johnnie To Kei-fung
- Cheng Kam-chung
- Choi Yick-wai
- Barbara Fei
- Ho Ho-chuen
- Leon Ko Sai-tseung
- Perry Lam
- Lo Yeung-kit, Alan
- Mok Fung-yee, Emily
- Ng Mien-hua, Nikki
- Yuen Siu-fai
- Secretary for Home Affairs or his representative
- Director of Leisure and Cultural Services or her representative
- Permanent Secretary for Education or her representative

In late 2012, the Council began a review and consultation of the process for election of its 10 'art-form' members, after criticism that the narrow base, which excluded both individual and commercial arts practitioners, was unrepresentative. As a result, the voter base for elections in late 2013 was expanded to 730 arts organisations and 1,492 individual arts workers.

=== Chairmen ===
Office holder	Term	Notes
Patrick Ho Chi-ping,	1999–2001	
Patrick Ho Chi-ping	2002–2005	[2nd term] ophthalmologist and previous member of the Hong Kong Philharmonic Society committee
unknown	2005–2007	Appointment of chairman was delayed from usual 1 Jan
Ma Fung-kwok	2008–2010	He was later elected to the Sports, Performing Arts, Culture and Publication functional constituency seat in the Legislative Council 2012 election.
Wong Ying-wai, Wilfred	2011–2022	
Kenneth Fok Kai-kong	2023–Current	

== Operations ==
The Council receives annual funding of HK$87 million from the Home Affairs Bureau.

In the year ended 31 March 2012, the ADC provided funding for the arts viz: HK$4.8 million of one-year grants, HK$20.4 million of two-year grants, HK$8.4 million of (two-year) multi-project grants, and HK$14.3 million of (one-year) project grants.

The organisation has been criticised for lacking the executive power and resources to implement policies directly, despite its claim to 'coordinate policy and planning'.

In 2013, the HKADC awarded its first Critic's Prize but was promptly embroiled in controversy when the winner of the HK$50,000 award was found to have connections with at least two of the six judges. The issue led to expanded criticism of the award, such as for its exclusion of English-language entries.

In 2024, the HKADC pulled funding for the Hong Kong Drama Awards after supporting it for more than 20 years, accusing the show of deviating "from past practices" by inviting Wong Kei-kwan and Bao Choy at the 2023 show. HKADC member Kenneth Fok said that the funding was withdrawn to "reduce the risk of potentially breaching" the national security law.

=== Chief Executives ===
Day-to-day administration is led by a Chief Executive (formerly 'Secretary General'), appointed by the Council.

Office holder	Office	Term	Notes
Tseng Sun-man	Secretary General	1997 to 2001	
Albert Lam Chi-chiu, OBE, JP	Chief Executive	May 2001 – ?2004	
Jonathan Yu	Chief Executive	April 2005 – 2007	(previously more than two decades with the KCRC)
Louis Yu Kwok-lit	Chief Executive	May 2007 – Oct 2011	
Chow Yung-ping	Chief Executive	Oct 2010–present	

=== Publication ===
The HKADC produces a regular newsletter of arts news, called ArtNews, every 3–4 months.

== See also ==
- Leisure and Cultural Services Department
- Community arts
