= Visual art of Hong Kong =

The visual art of Hong Kong, or Hong Kong art, refers to all forms of visual art in or associated with Hong Kong throughout its history and towards the present. The history of Hong Kong art is closely related to the broader history of Chinese art, alongside the art of Taiwan and Macau. Hong Kong art may include pottery and rock art from Hong Kong's prehistoric periods; calligraphy, Chinese ink painting, and pottery from its time under Imperial China; paintings from the New Ink Painting Movement and avant-garde art emerging during Hong Kong's colonial period; and the contemporary art practices in post-handover Hong Kong today.

The consciousness of modern art and international art movements may be observed in Hong Kong in the late 1960s and early 1970s. The emergence of the New Ink Painting Movement during that period saw aspects of Chinese ink painting incorporated with the gestural brushwork of Abstract Expressionism.

Hong Kong is now considered a significant regional art market due to its unique historical development and geographical position.

== Prehistoric Hong Kong ==
Prehistoric Hong Kong is the period between the arrival of the first humans in Hong Kong and the start of recorded Chinese history during the Han dynasty.

=== Neolithic pottery ===
Excavations of Tung Wan Tsai North (Ma Wan) and Sha Tau Kok revealed instances of pottery from the Neolithic period. These include pottery with geometric patterns, along with tools like stepped adze, shouldered adze and other ground stone implements.

=== Rock carvings ===
Rock carvings dating back to what was the Bronze Age have been found in Hong Kong. There are nine officially listed Bronze Age rock carvings, featuring geometric and zoometric patterns carved into rocks, mostly found at coastal cliffs facing the sea.

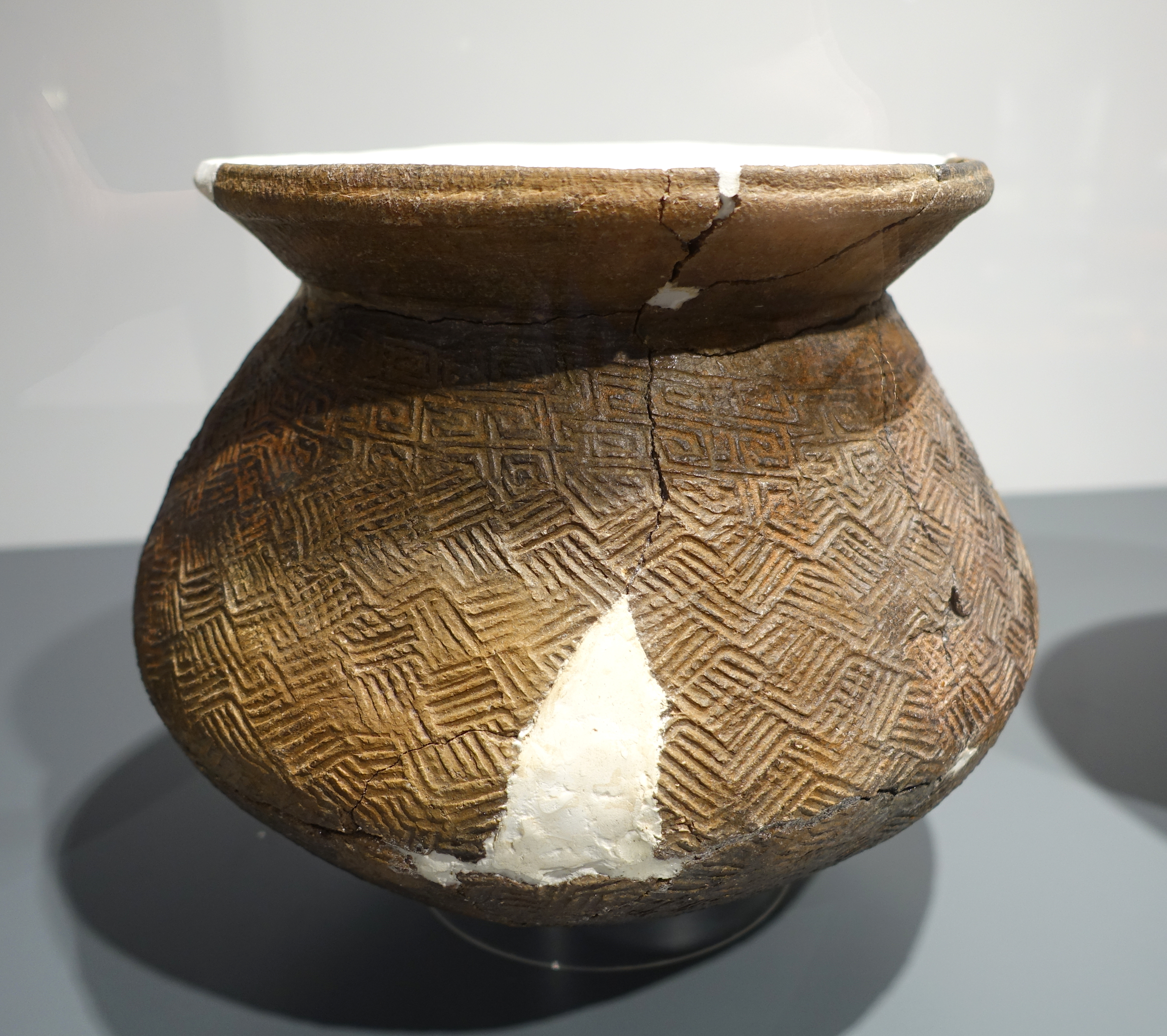
Late Neolithic pottery found in Tung Wan Tsai, Ma Wan. Hong Kong Museum of History

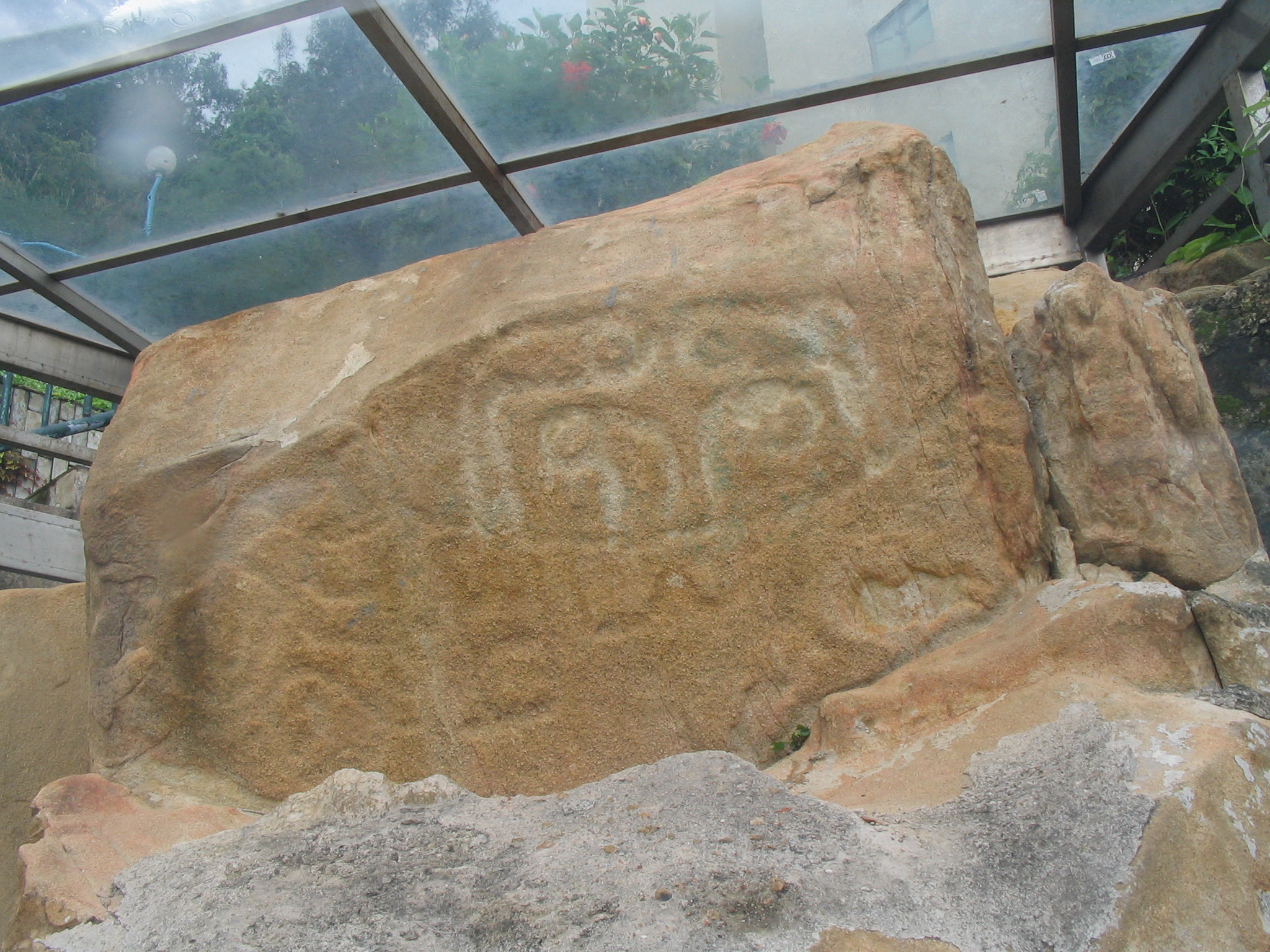
3000 year-old rock carving on Cheung Chau, discovered in 1970

== Hong Kong under Imperial China (221 BC–1841 AD) ==
The territory that now comprises Hong Kong was loosely part of China during the Qin dynasty (221–206 BC), and the area was part of the ancient kingdom of Nam Viet (203–111 BC). During the Qin dynasty, the territory was governed by Panyu County until the time of the Jin dynasty. The territory remained largely unoccupied until the later years of the Qing dynasty when Imperial China ceded the region to Great Britain under the 1842 Treaty of Nanking, whereupon Hong Kong became a British Colony.

More broadly, the art of Imperial China from this period encompasses examples such as Buddhist art, murals, calligraphy, ink painting, and pottery.

== Colonial Hong Kong (1841–1941) ==
Hong Kong was a colony and later a dependent territory of the British Empire from 1841 to 1997. The colonial period began with the British occupation of Hong Kong Island in 1841, during the First Opium War between the British and the Qing dynasty. The Qing had wanted to enforce its prohibition of opium importation within the dynasty that was being exported mostly from British India, as it was causing widespread addiction among its populace.

The island was ceded to Britain by the Treaty of Nanking, ratified by the Daoguang Emperor in the aftermath of the war of 1842. It was established as a crown colony in 1843. In 1860, the British took the opportunity to expand the colony with the addition of the Kowloon Peninsula after the Second Opium War, while the Qing was embroiled in handling the Taiping Rebellion. With the Qing further weakened after the First Sino-Japanese War, Hong Kong's territory was further extended in 1898 when the British obtained a 99-year lease of the New Territories.

=== Early art clubs and exhibitions (1920s–1930s) ===
Chances to view modern Western art were scarce in the early colonial period, with few foreign artists residing or exhibiting in Hong Kong, leaving the territory largely removed from international art movements. The main exception to this was Hong Kong's first art organisation, the Hong Kong Art Club, founded in 1925.

The Hong Kong Art Club was established and managed by wealthy British expatriates, with its members entirely composed of Europeans, most of whom were visiting artists staying temporarily in Hong Kong. The Hong Kong Art Club carried the most extensive collection of literature on modern Western art in the territory at the time. Its members predominantly practiced Western realism, depicting local scenery in the styles of the English landscape tradition and the Barbizon school, using oil and watercolour. Rather than being for artistic exchange, the club was primarily a context for social gathering. While artworks produced by the Club displayed minimal association with local Hong Kong artists, they are an early instance of organised artistic activity and significant for documenting the landscapes of Hong Kong at that specific moment in time.

A short announcement on the opening of a solo exhibition by Luis Chan was published on 16 April 1935 by Kung Sheung Daily News or the Industrial and Commercial News (Chinese: 工商日報). It was one of the earliest articles on arts and culture in Hong Kong newspapers, being the first of many short reports on art events, also documenting local activity for art at the time. Chan was a watercolour painter known for his naturalistic landscapes.

== Japanese occupation of Hong Kong (1941–1945) ==
The Imperial Japanese occupation of Hong Kong began when the Governor of Hong Kong, Sir Mark Young, surrendered the British Crown colony of Hong Kong to the Empire of Japan on 25 December 1941. The surrender occurred after 18 days of fierce fighting against the overwhelming Japanese forces that had invaded the territory. The occupation lasted for three years and eight months until Japan surrendered at the end of the Second World War. The length of this period (三年零八個月, lit. 'three years and eight months') later became a metonym of the occupation.

== Modern Hong Kong under British rule (1945–1997) ==
In the aftermath of the Japanese surrender, it was unclear whether the United Kingdom or the Republic of China would assume sovereignty of the territory. The Kuomintang's Chiang Kai-shek assumed that China, including formerly European-occupied territories such as Hong Kong and Macau, would be re-unified under his rule. However, the British moved quickly to regain control of Hong Kong. On 30 August 1945, British Rear Admiral Sir Cecil Halliday Jepson Harcourt sailed into Hong Kong to re-establish the British government's control over the colony. On 16 September 1945, Harcourt formally accepted the Japanese surrender from Maj.-Gen. Umekichi Okada and Vice Admiral Ruitaro Fujita at Government House. By November 1945, government controls were lifted and free markets restored. The population returned to around one million by early 1946 due to immigration from China.

The emergence of art collectives and societies from the late 1940s onwards, in addition to the opening of the city's first purpose-built visual art spaces, marked new developments in Hong Kong's art scene. While Hong Kong art in the 1950s saw little support from the government, the decade would still see the growth of art education in Hong Kong, through new art courses and the establishment of new institutions for teaching art. By the 1950s, large numbers of mainland Chinese artists had entered the territory and dominated the local art scene, with Hong Kong serving as a temporary site for them to continue working in traditional Chinese styles. These early immigrant artists, mainly from Shanghai and Nanjing, brought along with them wealth and artistic influences from the Shanghai School and the Jin Ning School. Stylistically, these works continued the orthodox traditions of Chinese ink painting, with little concern towards forming a specific Hong Kong identity. Artists from or based in Hong Kong would also begin participating in major international art exhibitions, with Wucius Wong and Ho Siu Kee participating in the 1959 São Paulo Art Biennial.

On 19 December 1984, British Prime Minister Margaret Thatcher and Chinese Premier Zhao Ziyang signed the Sino-British Joint Declaration, in which Britain agreed to return not only the New Territories but also Kowloon and Hong Kong itself when the lease term expired. China promised to implement a "One country, two systems" regime, under which for fifty years Hong Kong citizens could continue to practice capitalism and political freedoms forbidden on the mainland.

In 1995, the Hong Kong government established the Hong Kong Arts Development Council to "plan, promote and support the wide development of arts (including literature, performance, visual and film arts) and arts education," also including a visual arts sub-committee.

=== Art publications and education ===
On 25 November 1948, the Overseas Chinese Daily News (Chinese: 華僑日報) began publishing articles on art and culture. These articles were more detailed than those previously published in other newspapers, now including news on exhibition openings, art competitions, and commentaries on challenges faced by the cultural industries. In 1948, the Overseas Chinese Daily News also began publishing the Hong Kong Year Book, an annual publication on Hong Kong that continued until 1991.

The 1950s saw the growth of courses and institutions for art education in Hong Kong. In 1951, the first art course in Hong Kong was launched at the Grantham College (now the Education University of Hong Kong). The following year in 1952, the Hong Kong Academy of Fine Arts opened. In 1953, the University of Hong Kong's (HKU) Department of Chinese launches an undergraduate course in Chinese art and archeology.

=== The Modern Literature and Art Association (1958–1964) ===
In December 1958, the Modern Literature and Art Association was established by a group of writers and artists. Its mission, outlined in its founding manifesto, was to bring cultural workers together and reinvigorate declining cultural development in China. The association organised exhibitions, such as the Hong Kong International Salon of Paintings, and published periodicals.

From 1959 to 1960, the association would publish New Currents (Chinese: 新思潮). In 1963, the association would publish Modern Editions (Chinese: 好望角), a 13-issue periodical on arts.

The association became inactive from 1964 onwards. Members of the association would include artists and writers such as Hon Chi-fun, Quanan Shum, Cheung Yee, David Lam Chun-fai, King Chia-lun, Van Lau, and Wucius Wong.

=== Hong Kong Art Today (1962) ===
From 25 May to 4 July 1962, the exhibition Hong Kong Art Today (Chinese: 今日的香港藝術) was held at the Hong Kong City Hall Museum and Art Gallery (later renamed Hong Kong Museum of Art in 1975). Featuring a total of 120 exhibits by 65 artists, it was the first major exhibition of the Museum and Art Gallery after its opening in March, as well as the first large-scale art competition organised by the government. Hong Kong Art Today was thus significant as the first exhibition with Hong Kong art as its theme.

The museum's curator, John Warner, wrote in his introduction for the exhibition catalogue that the selected works were "valid" in their "preference for material quality, intelligent experiment and originality rather than outworn cliche, dull technical skill and cheap imitation." The exhibition reflected how naturalism in art had become passé and that abstract art was favoured at that moment in Hong Kong. In his 2001 article examining the incident and its consequences, Jack Lee, then studying for his PhD in art history, argued that, "[Warner's] prejudice for modern and abstract art influenced directly the museum's later exhibitions and its collection policies, which in turn caused some artists to turn to abstract art in the hope that their works would become appealing to the museum. Their conversion in due course formed a new tendency in Hong Kong art."

Apart from the usual practice of inviting participating artists, the event also incorporated an open call for submissions, which generated immense interest from the local art scene. However, the open call also led the exhibition to become controversial due to the rejection of established artists. Artist Luis Chan, an established naturalist watercolour painter active since the 1930s, was among the many artists whose works were rejected in the open call. Attempting a new direction in his practice, Chan had submitted several abstract paintings, though only one was accepted. Chan decided to make the rejection public, writing a long article about his frustrations with the exhibition titled "My Unsuccessful Submission to the City Hall Art Exhibition" (Chinese: 大會堂畫展落選記), which was published in serial form in the local Chinese newspaper Wah Kiu Yat Po over a period of time.

=== Circle Art Group (1964–1973) ===
In 1964, the Circle Art Group was founded by 9 local artists and remained active for about decade. Considered Hong Kong's "avant-garde", the artists used the circle as a symbol for the experimental synthesis of the Eastern and Western philosophies they explored in their work. The group was described in an early exhibition invitation as “a group that has no beginning, no ending and no leader”. The group's membership would fluctuate between 9 and 11 male artists and included many members of the Modern Literature and Art Association.

Members included Hon Chi-fun, Wucius Wong, Cheung Yee, Van Lau, King Chia-lun, David Lam Chun-fai, Jackson Yu (You Shaozeng), Paul Chui Yung-sang, Gilbert Pan Sze Chiu, Kuo Ven-chi, and Chen Ping Yuon.

=== New Ink Painting Movement (late 1960s–early 1970s) ===
The painter Lui Shou-Kwan initiated the New Ink Painting Movement, which saw aspects of Chinese ink painting heritage being incorporated with the simplified abstract structures and gestural brushwork of Abstract Expressionism. Although the People's Republic less open to outside influences during this period, Hong Kong artists were engaging with then-current Western signifiers of contemporaneity, along with their Taiwanese counterparts.

=== International auction houses ===
International auction houses such as Sotheby's and Christie's are based in Hong Kong. In the early 1970s, the international auction house Sotheby's first entered Hong Kong. In 1986, Christie's would also set up in Hong Kong. Later, both Sotheby's and Christie's moved their Asian headquarters from Taiwan to Hong Kong in 1999 and 2001 respectively.

=== Videotage ===
Videotage (Chinese: 錄映太奇) was founded in 1986 as an artist collective composed of artists Comyn Mo, Ellen Pau, May Fung, and Wong Chi-fai. It was initially set up at a space borrowed from the experimental theatre group Zuni Icosahedron's headquarters in Happy Valley, Hong Kong Island. Videotage was the earliest organisation in Hong Kong to focus on video art and new media.

Videotage's name is a portmanteau of "video" and "montage," first used as the title of a screening programme organised by the Phoenix Cine Club in June 1986. The screening featured works by Jim Shum, Neco Lo, Wong Chi-fai, and David Som, with a distinct focus on alternative time-based work. After the Phoenix Cine Club closed, some of its members, Comyn Mo, Ellen Pau, May Fung, and Wong Chi-fai, re-purposed the name Videotage for their art collective, seeking to preserve the experimental ethos of the earlier Phoenix Cine Club programme.

=== Para Site ===
Para Site (Chinese: 藝術空間) is Hong Kong's first artist-run art space, founded in 1996 by artists Patrick Lee, Leung Chi-wo, Phoebe Man Ching-ying, Sara Wong Chi-hang, Leung Mee-ping, Tsang Tak-ping, and Lisa Cheung.

== Hong Kong after the handover (1997–present) ==
Sovereignty of Hong Kong was eventually handed over to the People's Republic of China (PRC) in 1997, after the 1984 Sino–British Joint Declaration. The Republic of China government is now based in Taipei, having lost the mainland in the Chinese Civil War shortly after the Japanese surrender.

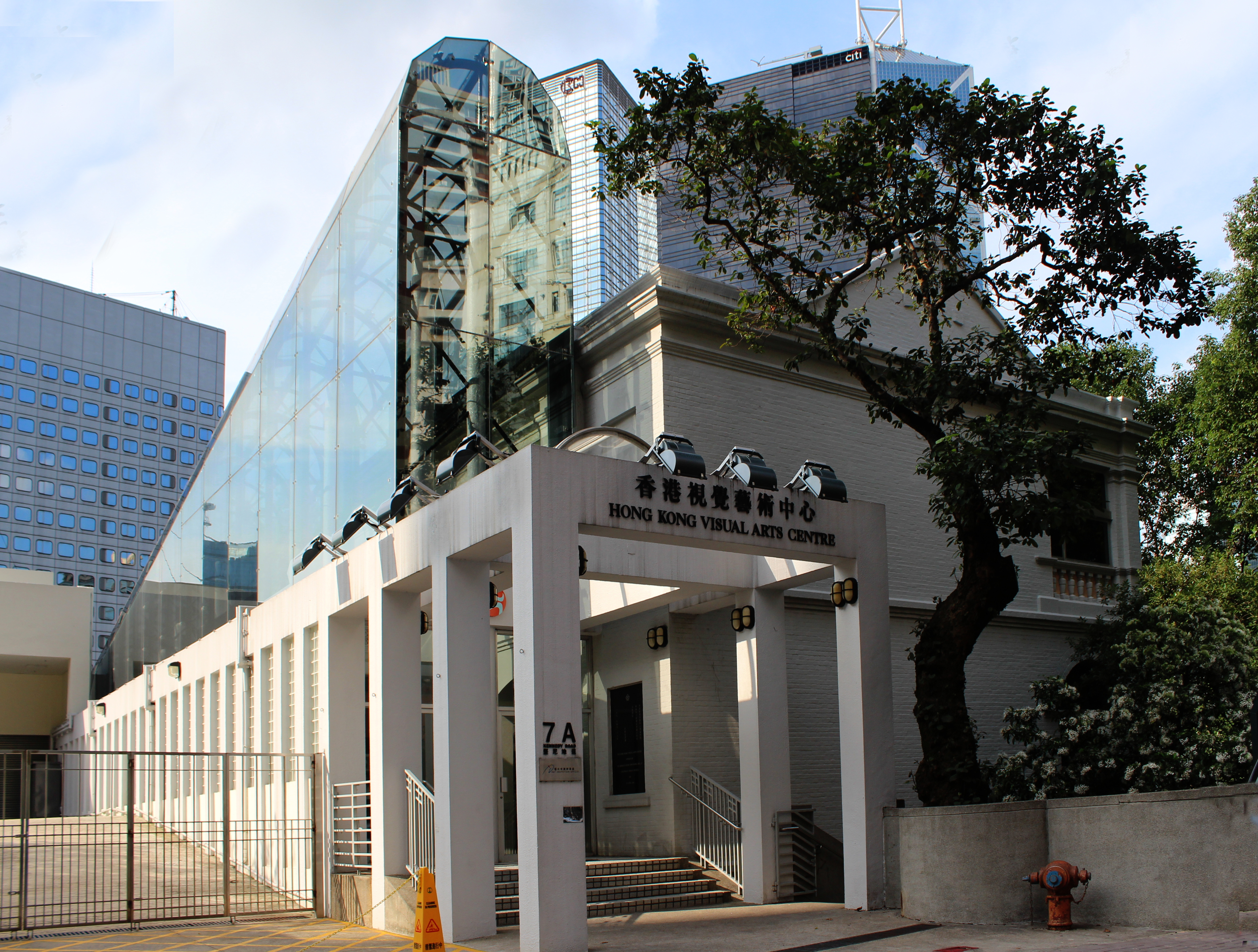
Hong Kong Visual Arts Centre in 2013

The Leisure and Cultural Services Department set up an arts promotion office in April 2001, responsible for public arts, community arts and a visual arts centre. In August 2005, the Hong Kong Arts Development Council announced the "One Year Funding 2006" program for visual arts. The program encouraged art groups to engage in various forms of artistic activities such as creation, publishing, exhibitions, forums, seminars, workshops, and courses to enhance the community's understanding and support for visual arts in Hong Kong.

Due to the increasing emphasis on art and culture in Hong Kong society from the 1990s, studying the history of Hong Kong art has become a greater priority in colleges and universities. The Hong Kong Visual Arts Yearbook is one of the commissioned research projects hosted by the Chinese University of Hong Kong's Art Department. The Hong Kong Visual Arts Yearbook has been published annually since 2015. Through collection, collation, and classification, the data in the yearbooks document the development of art in the city, while art historical articles contribute to academic and professional art-historical analyses of Hong Kong art.

=== Ha Bik Chuen Archive ===
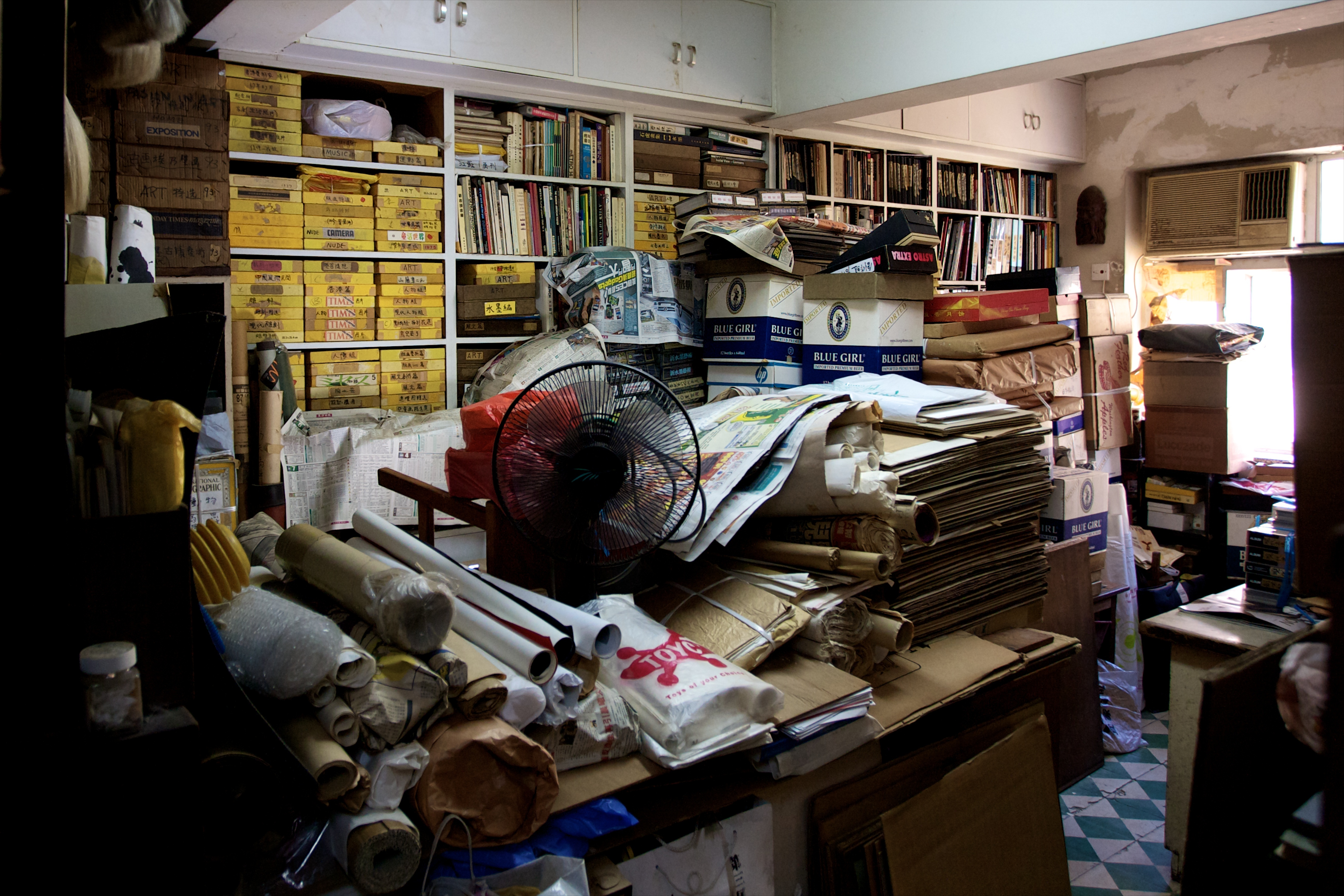
View of Ha Bik Chuen's To Kwa Wan studio, 2014

Made accessible to the public in 2013, the Ha Bik Chuen Archive is an important resource in the study of Hong Kong art history. Ha Bik Chuen, known largely as a sculptor and printmaker, also had a practice of photographing many of the exhibitions he attended, further collecting materials like illustrated magazines and artist portraits, which Ha also used to make book collages. By the time of Ha's death in 2009, he had amassed at his Hong Kong studio in To Kwa Wan an archive of over 100,000 photographs, 3,500 contact sheets, exhibition ephemera, and periodicals from the 1950s onward, all largely related to Hong Kong art.

In 2013, the Ha family invited the Asia Art Archive (AAA) to map, assess, and selectively digitise the archive, making Ha's collection public for the first time. In July 2016, Ha's archive was relocated to a new space in Fo Tan by AAA due to the deteriorating conditions of Ha's To Kwa Wan studio.

Materials from the Ha Bik Chuen Archive have further been used as part of curatorial and exhibition projects like Excessive Enthusiasm: Ha Bik Chuen and the Archive as Practice (2015) and Striated Light (2016), along with an imagined collaboration between Ha Bik Chuen and fictional artist Suha Traboulsi, conceived by the Lebanese artist Walid Raad in a project titled Section 39_Index XXXVII: Traboulsi (2014).

=== Art of the Umbrella Movement ===
Artistic works were created as part of the Umbrella Movement in Hong Kong, a political movement emerging from the Hong Kong democracy protests of 2014 that demanded democracy in the election of the territory's top leader. Most of the physical works of art were located within the three main protest sites of Admiralty, Causeway Bay and Mong Kok, with some works originating from outside of Hong Kong.

For the students involved in the "Umbrella Revolution", art functioned as a vehicle of expression and a method of documenting political events. Use of the umbrella—an everyday item that protects users against the rain and the sun—by the protesters to deflect pepper spray and tear gas of the police, has given the object iconic status at a political level, symbolising resistance and the underlying social grievances.

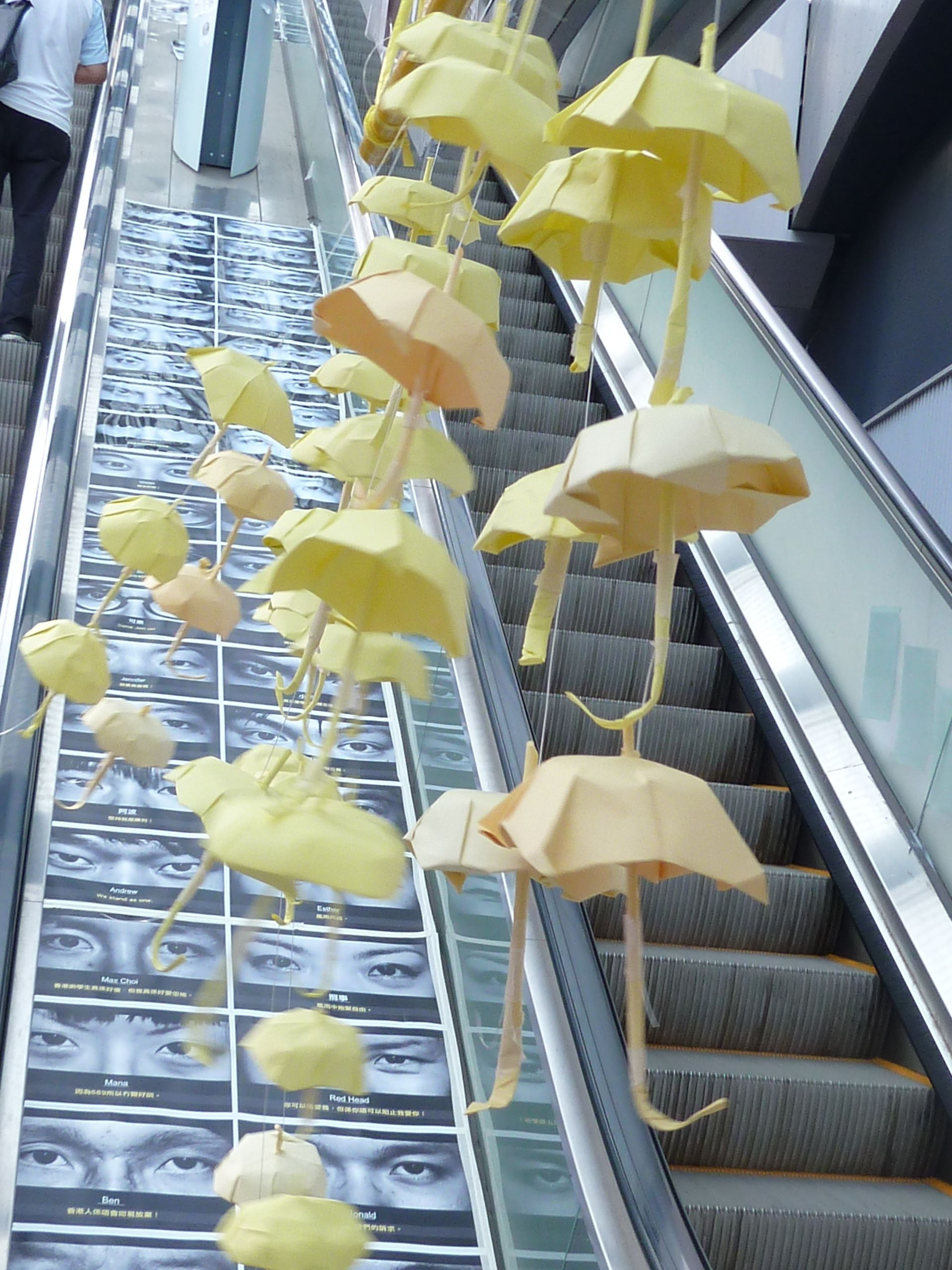
Origami mobile and escalator eyes (Umbrella Square)

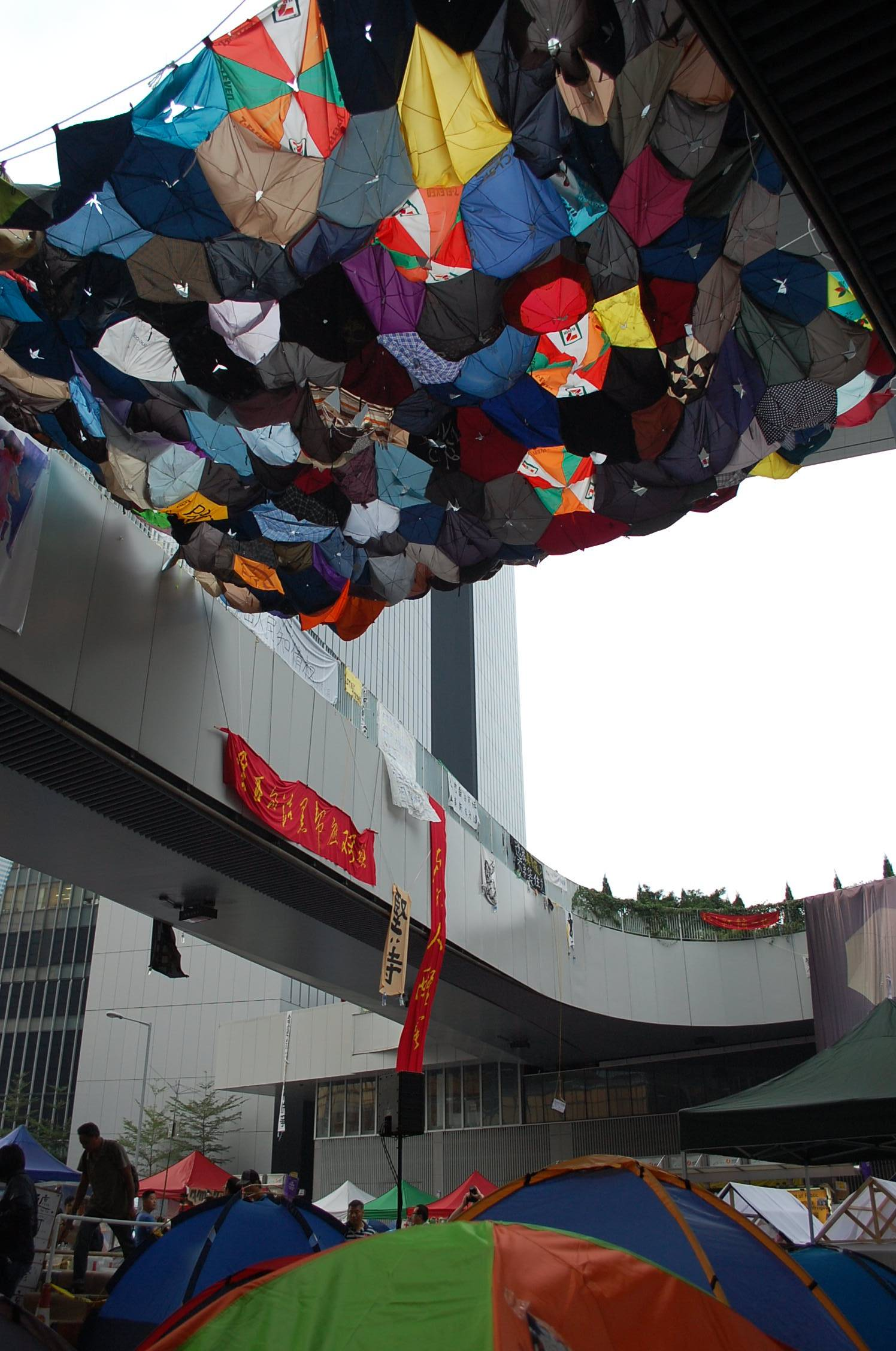
Patchwork canopy from umbrella fabric (Umbrella Square)

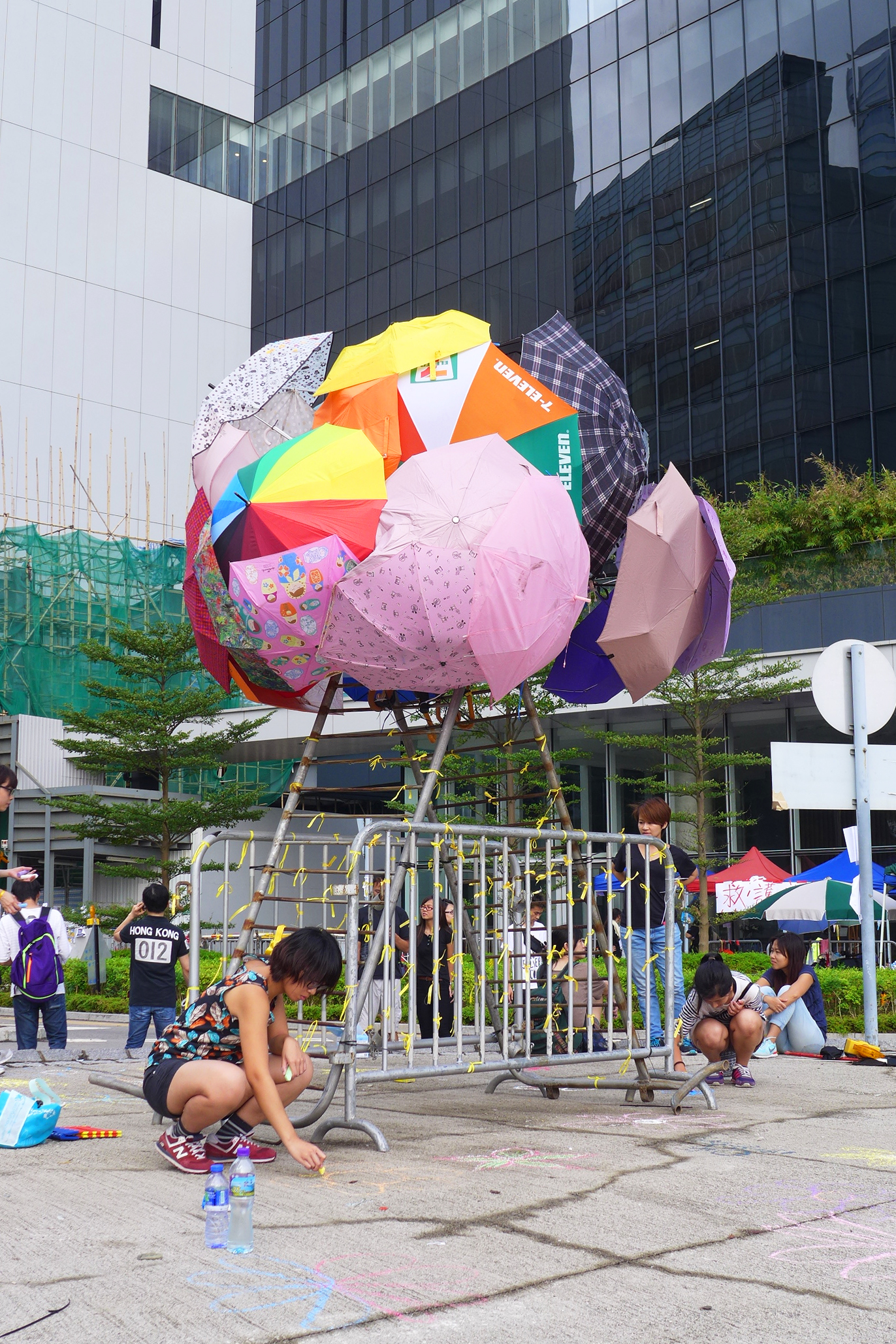
Installation on the Tim Mei Avenue roundabout (Umbrella Square)

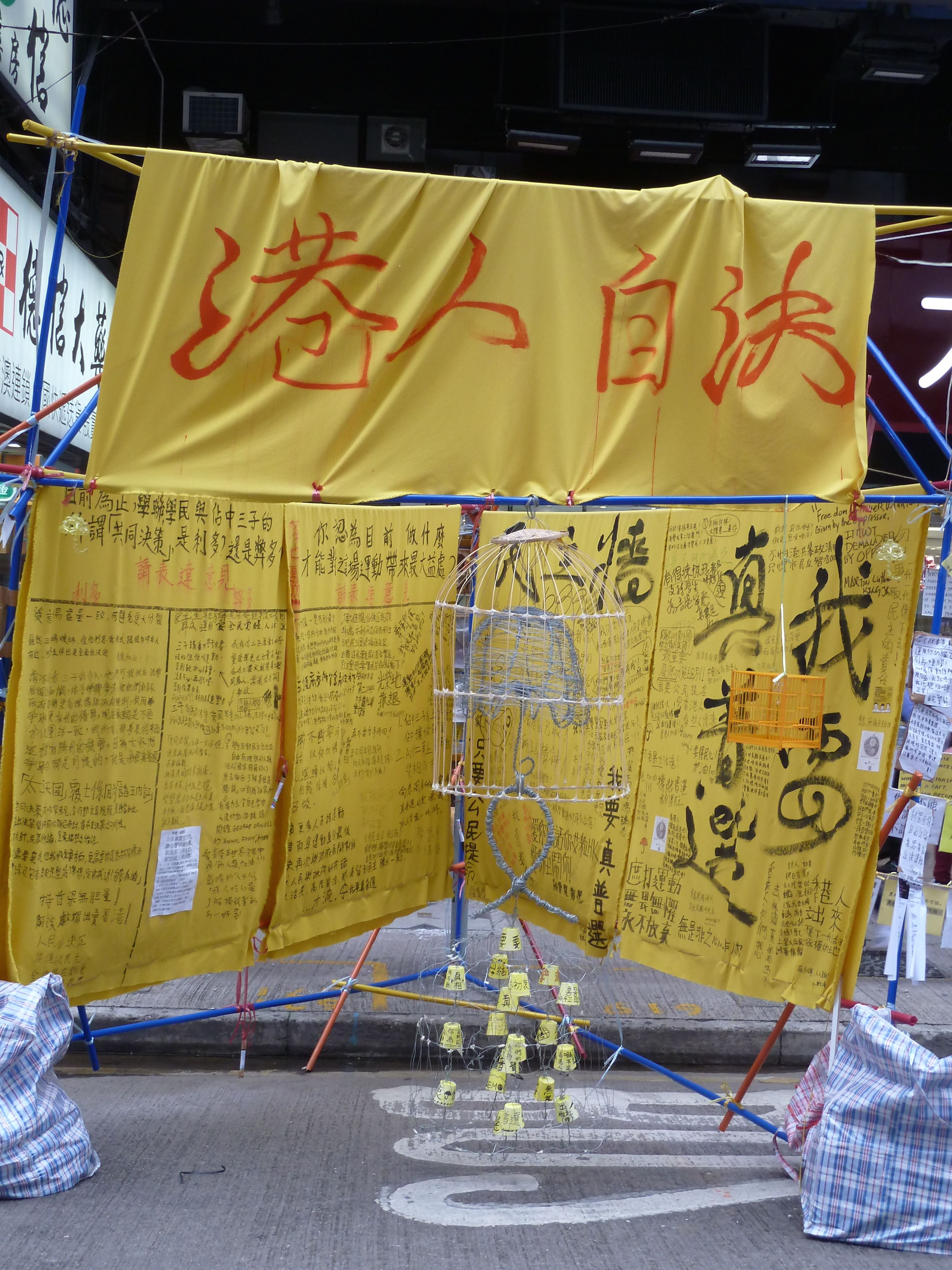
Birdcage (Causeway Bay)

=== Art of the 2019–2020 Hong Kong protests ===
Activists and artists taking part in the 2019–2020 Hong Kong protests used artwork, painting, music, and other forms of artistic expression as a tactic to help spread awareness about the political events occurring in the city. Individuals who create protest art are commonly referred to as being part of the movement's "publicity group" (文宣組). Creating protest art is seen as a peaceful, alternative way for citizens to express their views without participating in protests. Most members work under pseudonyms to protect their identity and stay in line with the movement's leaderless nature.

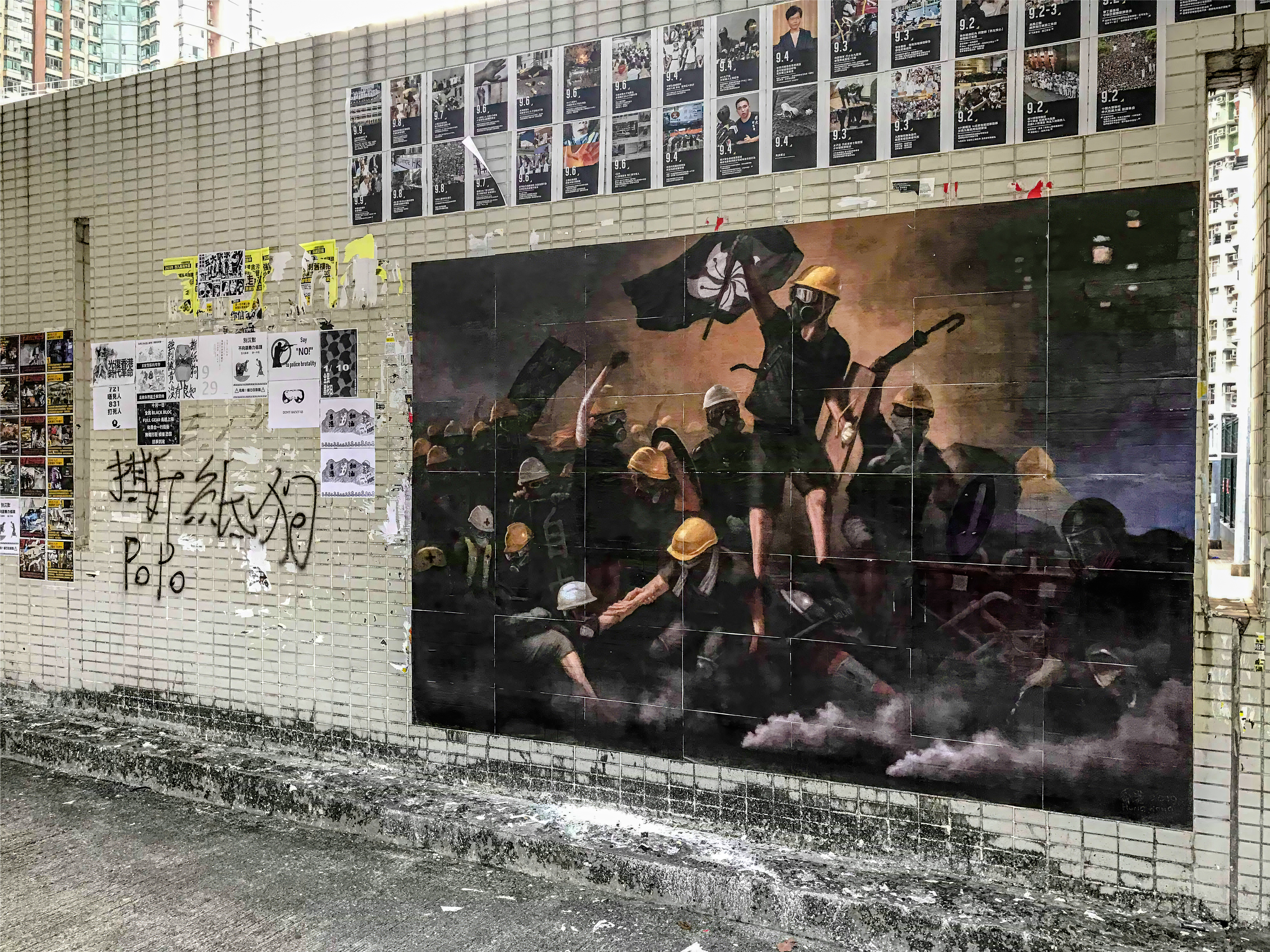
Protest artwork referencing Eugène Delacroix's Liberty Leading the People (1830)

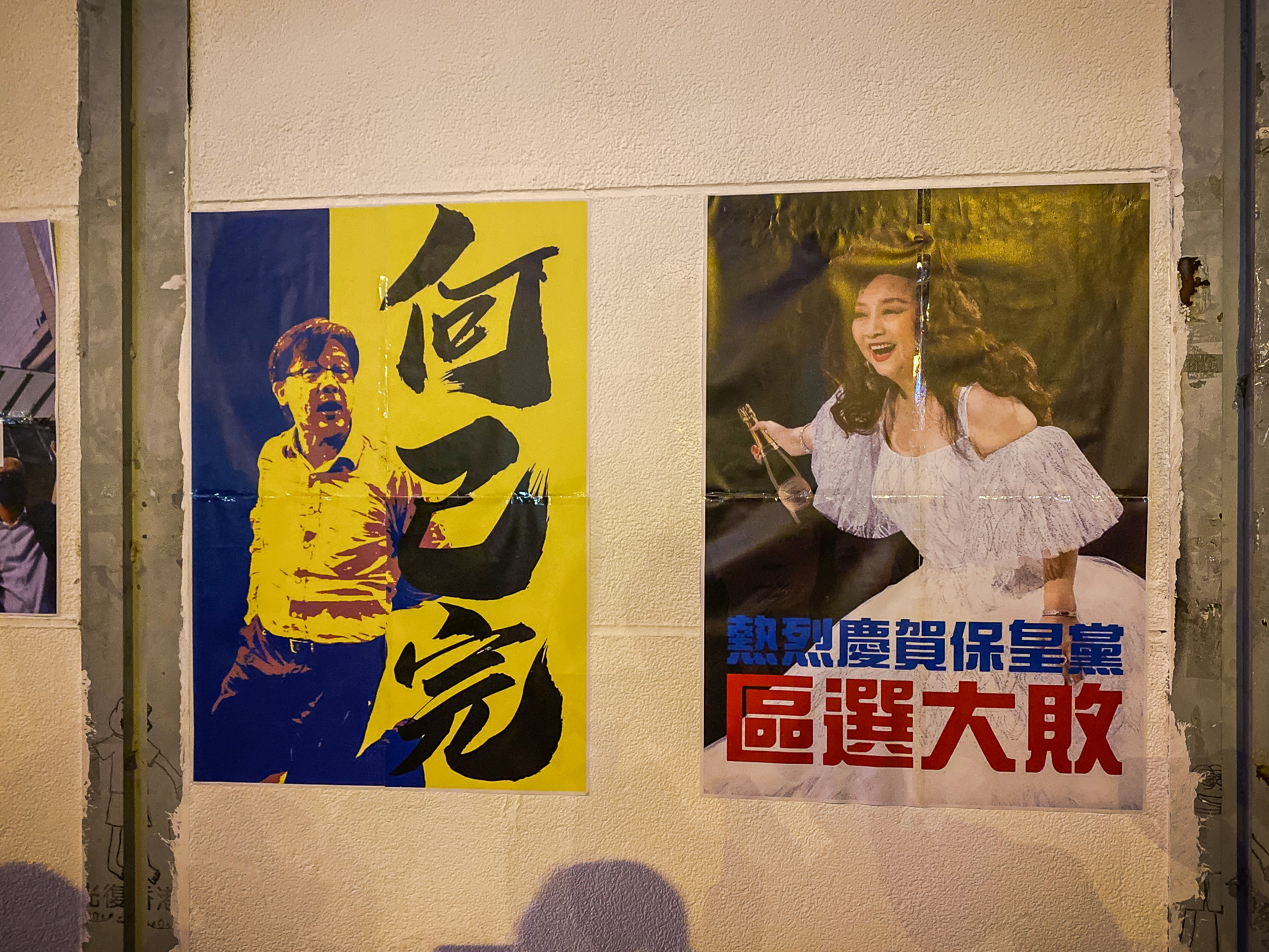
Posters mocking the pro-Beijing camp's electoral defeat after the 2019 Hong Kong local elections, November 2019

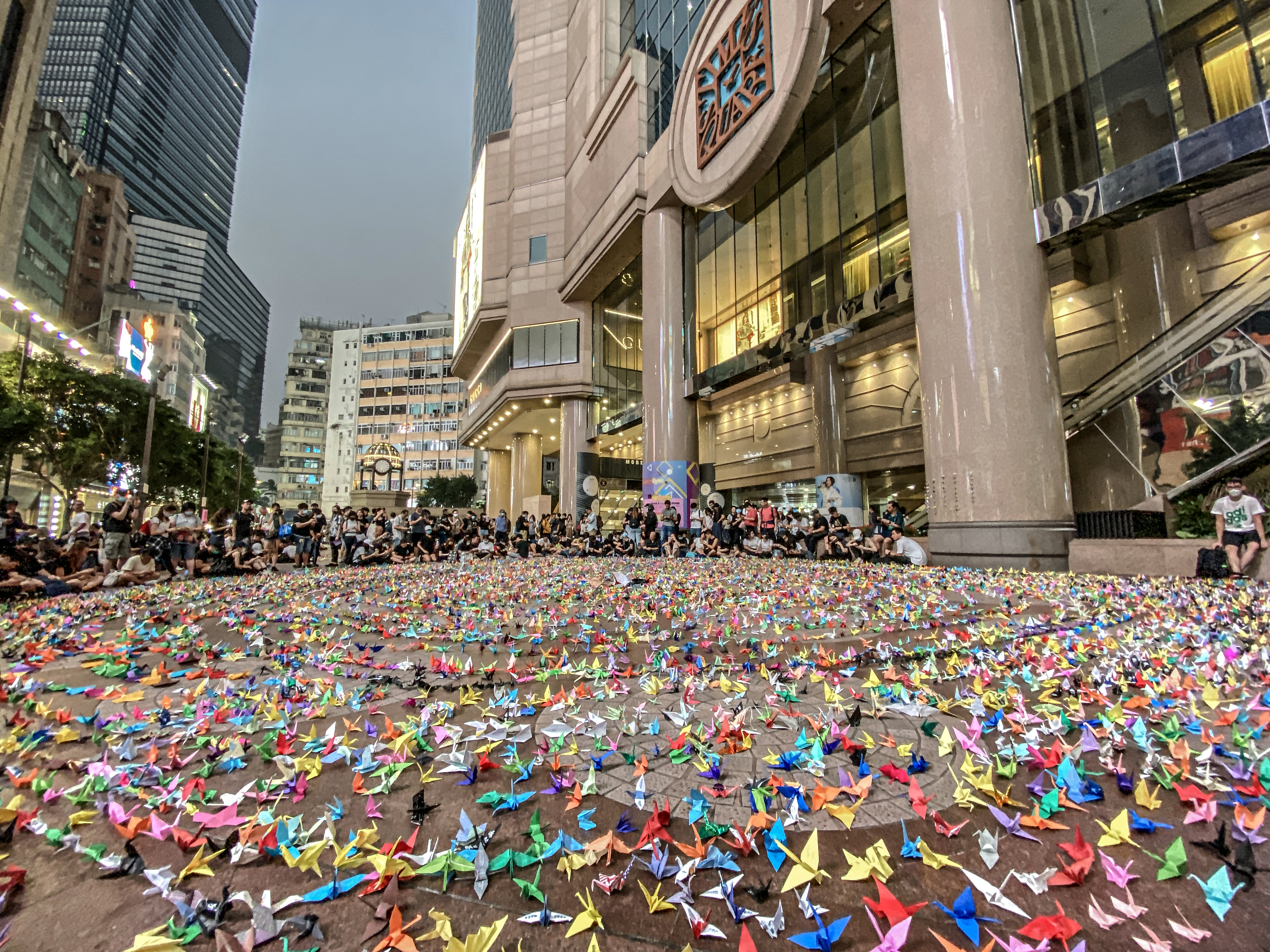
Folded origami "Freenix" during the anti-CCP protest, September 29, 2019

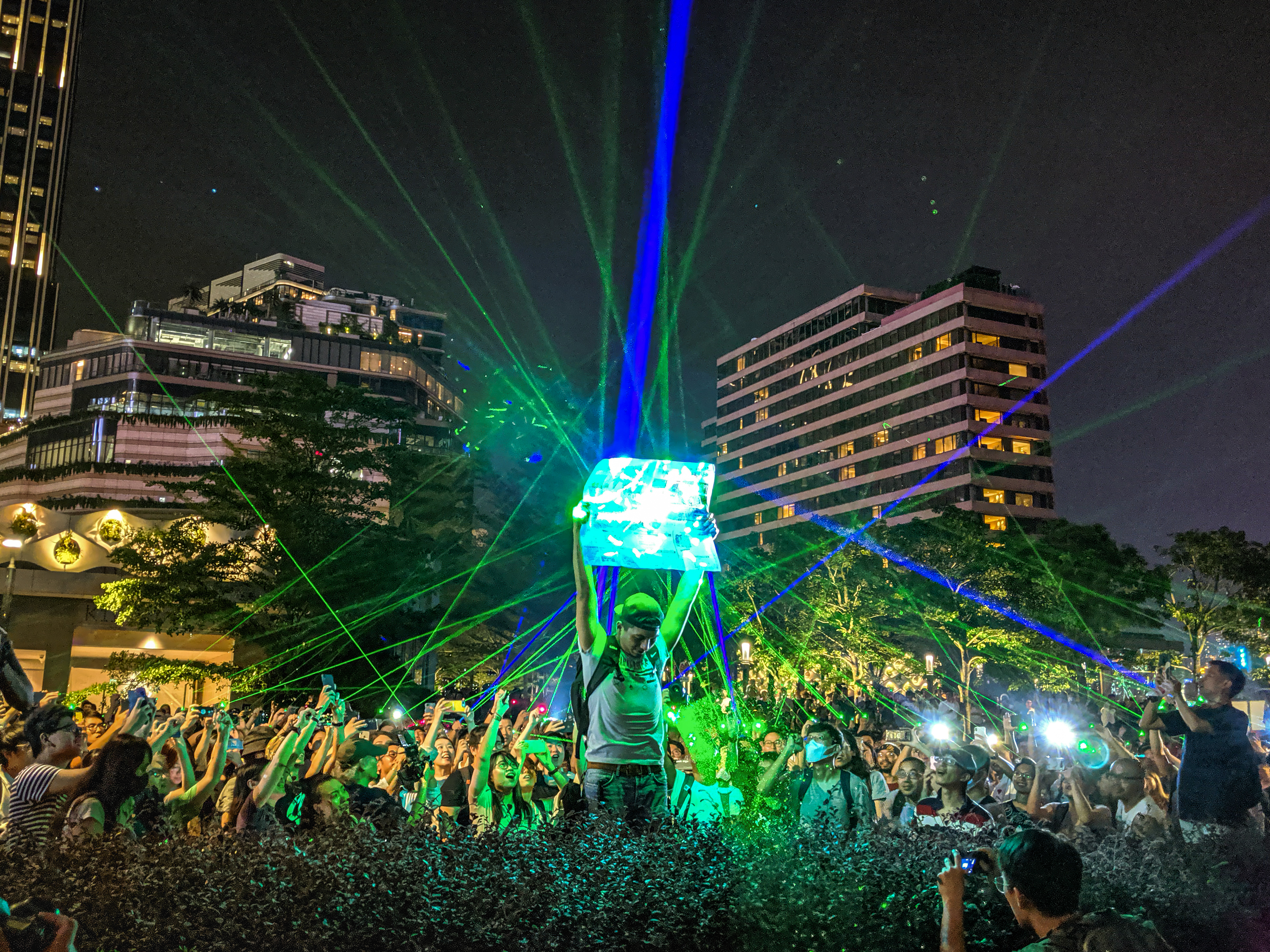
Protesters creating a light display by pointing laser pointers at a newspaper, mocking the police demonstration

== See also ==
- Culture of Hong Kong
- List of museums in Hong Kong
- Art of China
