= Irene Chou =

Chinese artist

- Born: January 31, 1924; Shanghai
- Died: July 1, 2011 (aged 87); Brisbane, Australia
- Education: St. John's University
- Style: ink painting
- Movement: New Ink Painting

Irene Chou (Chinese: 周綠雲; pinyin: Zhou Luyun) (January 31, 1924 – July 1, 2011) was a Chinese artist, one of the most influential exponents of the New Ink Painting movement in Hong Kong. A leader in the New Ink Painting Movement, Chou was at the forefront of reinventing traditional ink paintings into a contemporary art form. Her contribution to ink paintings has made an impact both regionally and internationally, making way for modern ink paintings in the global art scene.

== Life and work ==
Irene Chou was born in Shanghai, where she studied economics at St. John's University. Upon graduating in 1945, Chou worked as a journalist for Peace Daily Shanghai. Thereafter she left for Taipei in Taiwan and in 1949 for Hong Kong. Her mother, a professional calligrapher, gave her the first lesson. She began to learn painting formally in 1954 when she became a student of Zhao Shao'ang, a master of the traditional Lingnan school of painting. In her traditional landscape and bird-and-flower paintings Chou demonstrated a solid grounding in traditional Chinese painting methods such as qiyun (spirit-resonance) and moqi (ink-play). She said to have found inspiration in the study of qi-gong. Initially Chou drew influences from bright Chinese opera folk paintings and Great Seal Style calligraphy. The use of calligraphic lines in her work was informed by years of studying calligraphy and traditional Chinese ink painting techniques, especially the 'Storm Drum' script, which was first used to inscribe stones during the Qin dynasty (221-206BCE). Although Chou started her career working with more traditional Chinese painting methods and styles through landscape and bird-and-flower paintings, she later experimented with various techniques and paints as she moved away from more conventional ink paintings and the popular Lingnan style.

In the late 1960s Chou encountered abstract expressionism. The progressive theories on art and ink painting of her colleague Lui Shou-Kwan of the Lingnan School inspired her to experiment with different techniques and various types of paint, including oil, acrylic and watercolor. Kathy Zhang mentioned that artists working in this vein followed Lui's precepts and combined Western and Chinese art. Chou explored the "splash ink" technique, the layered "piled ink" technique, and pointillism in her works in the 1970s. However, her signature mark became the "one-stroke" technique she applied to her abstract paintings, which was reminiscent of the New Ink style that was becoming popular in Hong Kong in the 1980s. Through her work, she attempted to combine Western and Chinese art while simultaneously paying homage to Chinese traditional art. Irene Chou was the Hong Kong representative for the United Nations' Women's Liberation.

After the death of her mentor Lui Shou-Kwan in 1975 and her husband in 1978, the style of Chou's work changed fundamentally. But this depression gave her enormous energy and so her style became bolder and more spontaneous. Her works from this period were informed by her exposure to abstract expressionism, Neo-Confucianism, Buddhism and Taoism. Her works of the 1980s were representative of the New Ink style emerging in Hong Kong. Her works in the 1980s demonstrate her mastery of a range of techniques associated with both the 'impact structural strokes' – the artist's distinctive violent and short brushstrokes associated with her Impact series style and the dense ink associated with her 'Dark Painting' style developed in the late 1970s. The artist carefully applied multiple layers of ink wash to both sides of the thin xuan paper (rice paper), systematically creating a sense of structure and depth, while forming a dark, thick and concentrated ink layer with a luminous surface and soft tones. In the 1980s she won several awards and became a key figure in the contemporary Hong Kong art scene.

At age 67, Chou experienced a life-threatening stroke, and after intensive physiotherapy, she moved to Brisbane, Australia, from Hong Kong to be closer to her son. This experience led her to have a more melancholy approach to her art in this decade as Chou depicted images of rebirth on blackened backgrounds. In the following years she studied Buddhism and got interested in Aboriginal painting. The paintings were dark " I am not afraid of using black as some people are. ...In fact black is part of me the person". In the early 21st century her work became lighter and clearer with contrasting colors. She died in Brisbane, aged 87.

Chou's work was included in the 2021 exhibition Women in Abstraction at the Centre Pompidou.

== Collections ==
Chou's work is in the collections of the British Museum, the Boston Museum of Fine Arts, the Cleveland Museum of Art, the Queensland Art Gallery, and M+.

== Publications ==
- Chinese Painting by Irene Chou (綠雲畫藝), Catalogue, Fung Ping Shan Museum, University of Hong Kong, Hong Kong (香港): Fung Ping Shan Museum, University of Hong Kong, 1986.
- Paintings by Irene Chou (周綠雲畫展), Catalogue, Hanart 2 Gallery, Hong Kong (香港): Hanart 2 Gallery (漢雅軒), 1989.
- Irene Chou & Hon Chi-Fun Recent Paintings (周綠雲韓志勳近作), Hong Kong (香港): The Hong Kong Land Property Company Ltd. (香港置地物業有限公司), 1991.
- Catherine Maudsley (Ed.): Collectors' Choice: The Cosmic Vision of Zhou Luyun (周綠雲：玄黃天地，繽紛世界), Catalogue Cat Street Galleries, Hong Kong (香港): Casey Company Limited (啟時有限公司), 1995.
- The Universe Lies Within: Paintings by Irene Chou (宇宙是吾心 - 周綠雲的藝術), Catalogue The Rotunda, Hong Kong (香港): The Hong Kong Land Property Company Ltd. (香港置地物業有限公司), 1998.
- The Universe is My Mind - Irene Chou (宇宙便是吾心 - 周綠雲), Hong Kong (香港): Hanart TZ Gallery (漢雅軒), 2000.
- Grace Cheng, Margaret Kwokfan Yeung, Kwanlap Chan, Chunyi Lee (Eds.): The Universe is My Heart, My Heart is The Universe: The Art of Irene Chou (宇宙即吾心，吾心即宇宙：周綠雲作品集), Catalogue Hong Kong Arts Centre, Hong Kong (香港): Hong Kong Arts Centre (香港藝術中心), 2003.
- Henry Auyeung (Ed.): From Representation to Revelation: The Transitional Works (1950-1990) of Irene Chou (周綠雲), Catalogue Grotto Fine Art, Hong Kong (香港): Grotto Fine Art (嘉圖藝術有限公司), 2004.
- Tina Yeewan Pang (Ed.): Universe of the Mind: Zhou Luyun (Irene Chou) a retrospective exhibition (游彩人生：周綠雲繪畫回顧展), Catalogue University Museum and Art Gallery, The University of Hong Kong, Hong Kong (香港): University Museum and Art Gallery, The University of Hong Kong (香港大學美術博物館), 2006.
- The Universe is My Heart, My Heart is the Universe. Catalogue, Hong Kong Art Center, February 2003. ISBN 978-962-7630-45-6.
- Universe of the Mind, Zhou Luyun (Irene Chou) a retrospective exhibition. The University of Hong Kong. March 2006. ISBN 978-962-8038-47-3.
