= Hong Kong Art Today =

External image
- Photograph of John Warner, the founding curator of the Hong Kong City Hall Museum and Art Gallery

Hong Kong Art Today (Chinese: 今日的香港藝術) was an exhibition held at the Hong Kong City Hall Museum and Art Gallery (later renamed Hong Kong Museum of Art in 1975) from 25 May to 4 July 1962. Featuring a total of 120 exhibits by 65 artists, it was the first major exhibition of the Museum and Art Gallery after its opening in March, as well as the first large-scale art competition organised by the government.

Apart from the usual practice of inviting participating artists, the event also incorporated an open call for submissions, which caught the attention of the local art scene. In his introductory text for the exhibition catalogue, the museum's curator John Warner explained what he envisioned as the "valid art forms of to-day": "They have shown a preference for material quality, intelligent experiment and originality rather than outworn cliche, dull technical skill and cheap imitation."

== Significance ==
The Museum and Art Gallery was housed in the High Block of the newly built Hong Kong City Hall, a modernist building by the waterfront of Central, Hong Kong. This new museum had a clear-cut policy to promote and recognise "Hong Kong art"—not Chinese, British, or other Western art. As a prominent event in the series of inaugural programmes for the new premises, Hong Kong Art Today was a manifestation of this mission. It was the first exhibition with Hong Kong art as its theme.

Though it was an exhibition mounted in a museum setting, the artworks were for sale, with prices marked in the catalogue. The Museum and Art Gallery acquired some of the works which formed the foundation of its Hong Kong art collection.

== Controversy ==
The open call was successful in generating immense interest from the local art scene, however, it was for this reason that the exhibition soon became controversial.

Artist Luis Chan was among the many artists whose works were rejected in the open call. Chan, a watercolour painter known for his naturalistic style landscapes, had been active in the local art scene since the 1930s. He submitted several abstract works to the exhibition—a somewhat new direction of Chan's artistic endeavour. Only one of his works was accepted. As an established figure in the 1950s, and appointed an advisor to the newly established museum, his failure stirred up a storm in the local art circle, especially when Chan decided to make the rejection public to express his frustrations and address the problems of the exhibition. He wrote a long article titled "My Unsuccessful Submission to the City Hall Art Exhibition" (Chinese: 大會堂畫展落選記), which was published in serial form in the local Chinese newspaper Wah Kiu Yat Po over a period of time.

The issues surrounding the debate included: works by famous artists of the time failing to be accepted through the open call; many rejected artists coming from the same art club (the Contemporary Chinese Artists' Guild, of which Chan was chair); the obscure criteria of adjudication under the confidentiality of the selection panel; the imbalanced quantity of Chinese paintings and Western paintings being selected; and the selections leaning towards abstract art.

The exhibition reflected how naturalism in art had become passé and that abstract art was favoured. In his 2001 article examining the incident and its consequences, Jack Lee, then studying for his PhD in art history, argued that, "[Warner's] prejudice for modern and abstract art influenced directly the museum's later exhibitions and its collection policies, which in turn caused some artists to turn to abstract art in the hope that their works would become appealing to the museum. Their conversion in due course formed a new tendency in Hong Kong art."

On a personal level, Luis Chan's rejection was a "career catastrophe" as described by art historian David Clarke, who observed that, "for a great part of the 1960s [Chan's] work evidences his loss of artistic security." Chan's trials in abstraction came across as a failure, and his next artistic breakthrough did not come until a decade later.

== Artists ==
65 Artists participated in the exhibition. It included:

- Amy KONG
- CHAN Chingtao
- CHAN Kauon
- CHAN Lukkee
- CHAO Shaoan
- CHEN Wingkeen
- CHEUNG Yee
- CHOU Wingchim
- CHOW Saitsung
- CHUI Yungsang Paul
- Cuy SICHEL
- D. G. WYE
- David PUN
- Douglas BLAND,
- Edmund EMAMOODEN
- F. WILLIAMS
- H. G. HOLLMAN
- Jackson YU
- John HADFIELD
- Julia BARON
- K. E. TOMLIN
- KING Chialun
- KONG Pakyu
- KUO Venchi
- KWONG Yeuting
- LI Fanping
- LI Mancheung
- LAI Ming
- LAM Chaktin
- LAM Chunfai David
- LAM Kintung
- LAU Ytong
- LEE Kwokwing
- LEE Laudan
- LEUNG Pakyu
- LEUNG Sikchong
- LO Kuichuen
- LU Wuye
- LUI Chanming
- LUI Shoukwan
- Luis CHAN
- MAN TAM Waiha
- J.P. POTTER
- Marianne SCHIOLL
- Mavis BAKER
- Mrs HOLZBURGER
- HON Chifun
- Gilbert PAN
- PANG Jen
- Raymond KONG
- Rose WU
- Roy RIDGEWAY
- SUNG Cheyuen
- TSE Kongwah
- Wendy YEO
- John WARNER
- WONG Kachai
- WONG Hoyin
- WONG Michael Cheung
- WONG Poyeh
- WONG Puiwoo
- Wucius Wong
- Y. ELIAS
- YANG Shanshen
- YEN Eking

== See also ==
- Visual art of Hong Kong
- Culture of Hong Kong
