= Wucius Wong =

Chinese artist

- 王無邪 (Wang Wuxie)
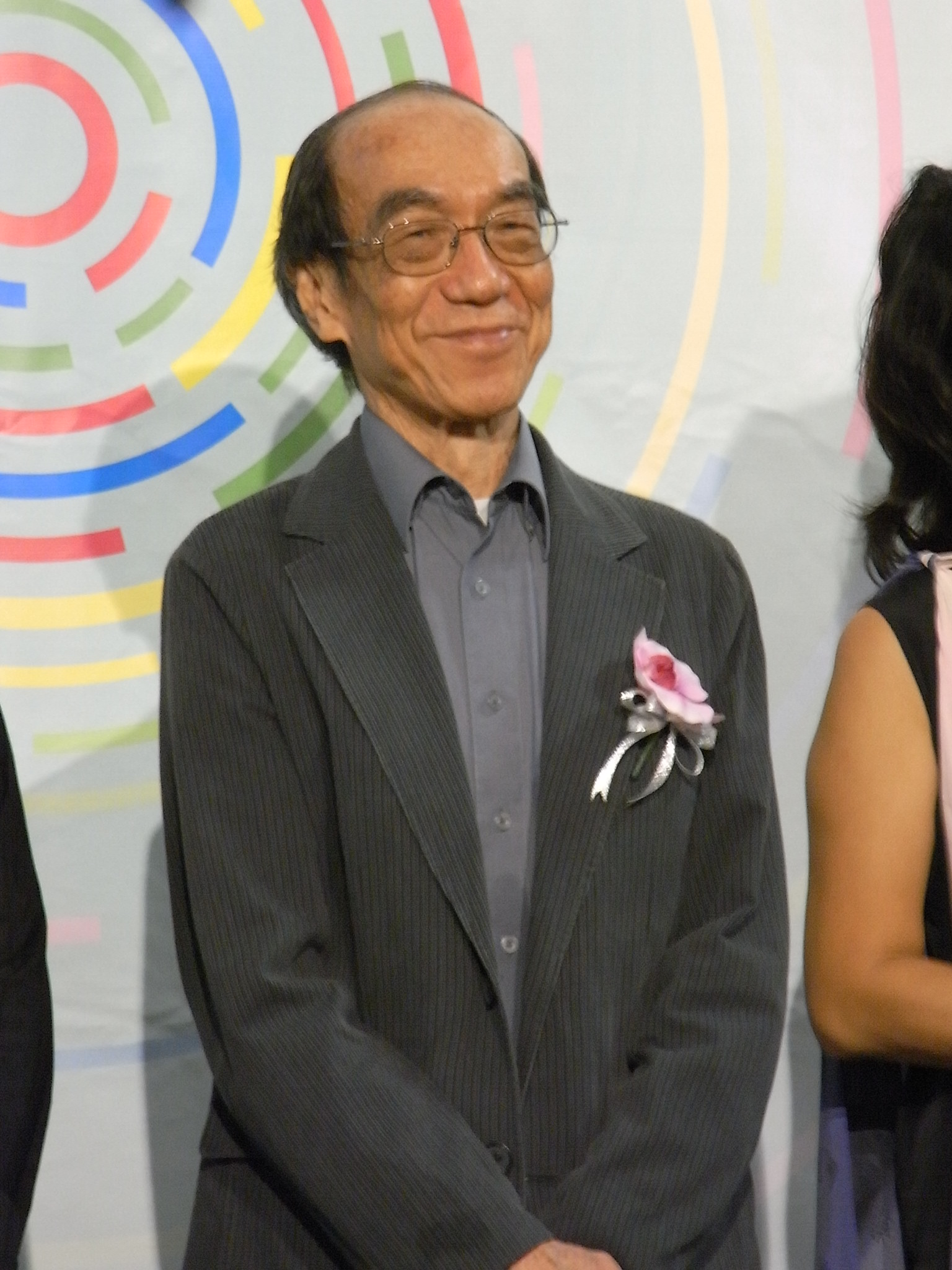
- Wong at the Hong Kong City Hall, 2010
- Born: 1936 (age 89–90); Guangzhou, China
- Education: Maryland Institute College of Art
- Movement: Modernism; Hong Kong New Ink Movement
- Awards: Bronze Bauhinia Star (2007)

Wucius Wong (born 1936; Chinese: 王無邪 (Wang Wuxie)) is a Hong Kong Chinese ink painter and lead figure of the Hong Kong New Ink Movement. He has worked to bring attention to Hong Kong's efforts in Chinese contemporary art, and was one of the first artists to bring modernism to the region.

== Early life and education ==
Wong was born in Guangzhou in 1936, but moved to British Hong Kong the year after. As he grew up, he was surrounded by Chinese culture.

He began studying art in 1955 under Lui Shou-Kwan, the prominent Hong Kong ink artist. In the 1960s, Wong left Hong Kong for the United States, attending art school in Ohio and Baltimore for four years. He was awarded a masters degree in Fine Arts from the Maryland Institute College of Art. He has taught such artists as Wong Chung-yu, and was an inspiration of Rosamond Brown, a British artist who lived in Hong Kong.

He was inspired by the landscape paintings of the Song dynasty, the geometric designs of the Bauhaus movement, and the textured strokes of the Chinese ink movement.

== Art and academic career ==
After his studies, Wong returned to Hong Kong and taught design for ten years at Hong Kong Polytechnic (later Hong Kong Polytechnic University).

From 25 May to 4 July 1962, Wong's work was exhibited at the major exhibition, Hong Kong Art Today, at the Hong Kong City Hall Museum and Art Gallery (later renamed Hong Kong Museum of Art in 1975). It was significant as the first exhibition with Hong Kong art as its theme. The exhibition also reflected how naturalism in art had become passé and that abstract art was favoured at that moment in time.

From 1966 until 1974, he was assistant curator at the Hong Kong Museum of Art. In 1970, he was received a grant from the Rockefeller Foundation. In 1984, he moved back to the United States. He eventually established a permanent Hong Kong home in 1997.

Wong worked with Pat Suet-bik Hui (Xu Xuebi) in creating a mix of painting, poetry, and calligraphy.

In 1998, he received an Emeritus Fellowship from the Hong Kong Arts Development Council. He has been recognised by the Asia Society through their Asia Arts Game Changer Awards. In 2007, he was awarded the Bronze Bauhinia Star by the Hong Kong government.

On 24 January 2017, he was granted the title of "University Fellowship" by Hong Kong Polytechnic University.

His works have been sold by Sotheby's in Hong Kong.

Wong also founded a literary magazine. His lyrical ideas and poetry can be seen to have an effect on his painting, where he "conveys personal feelings through colour, structure, and texture."

== Selected works ==
=== Books ===
- Principles of Two-Dimensional Design. Wiley. Dec 1972. ISBN 9780471289609.
- Principles of Color Design. Wiley. 1987. ISBN 9780442292843.
- Wucius Wong The Tao of Chinese Landscape painting. Design Press. 1991. ISBN 0830690107.
- Principles of Form and Design. Wiley. 1993. ISBN 9780471285526.

=== Paintings ===
- Sky-Land Expression 1 (Diptych)
- Deep in the Mountains No. 2
- Thoughts Across the Lands (1970)
- Purification #2 (1979)
- Agitated Waters No. 7 (1989)

== Selected awards ==
- Bronze Bauhinia Star (2007)
