= Ha Bik Chuen =

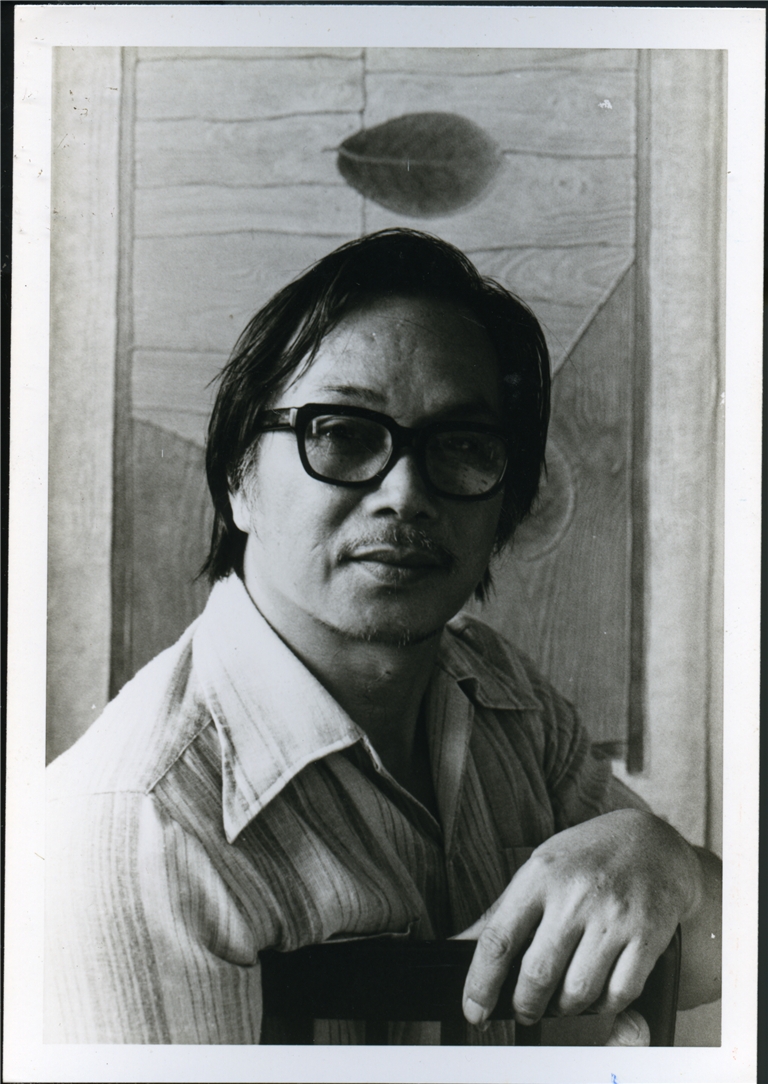
- Portrait of Ha Bik Chuen
- Born: 1925; Xinhui, Guangdong Province, China
- Died: October 18, 2009 (aged 84)
- Known for: Painting, sculpture, photography, woodblock prints, paper relief
- Awards: Urban Council Fine Art Awards (1975)

Ha Bik Chuen (1925 – 18 October 2009), also known as Xia Biquan, was a Hong Kong painter, sculptor, photographer and craftsman. Born in Xinhui, Guangdong Province of China, he moved to Hong Kong in 1957, and began to study sculpture. He joined the Chinese Contemporary Artists' Guild in 1960. He is also a member of Hong Kong Visual Arts Society, Hong Kong Graphic Society and Hong Kong Sculptors Association.

Specialized in woodblock print, paper relief and sculpture, his versatility marked his unique characteristics. He liked to use harmonious colors and simple compositions to reveal everyday objects in natural environments, such as autumn foliage, wilting leaves and discarded ropes with special attention to tonal balance and textural treatment.

Primarily known as a sculptor and printmaker, Ha Bik Chuen had parallel practices of photographing exhibitions he attended, and collecting materials including illustrated magazines and artist portraits which he also used in the construction of book collages. Ha's entire collection has been stored in his Hong Kong studio in To Kwa Wan since his passing in 2009 until its relocation to Fo Tan in 2016. Among the collection are over 100,000 photographs, 3,500 contact sheets, exhibition ephemera, periodicals collected by Ha from 1960s onward, which are important resources for the construction of Hong Kong art history.

== Ha Bik Chuen archive ==
In 2013 the Ha family invited Asia Art Archive (AAA) to launch a pilot project to map, assess, and selectively digitise Ha's archive. Made available to a wider audience for the first time, the archive consists of a vast selection of Ha's collage books, exhibition documentation, and exhibition catalogues.

In 2016, due to the deteriorating conditions of Ha's To Kwa Wan studio, his archive was relocated to a new space in Fo Tan by AAA. The relocation took place in the month of July, with the materials indexed by zones to preserve their original locations in the studio. Up to 500 boxes of materials were transferred from the 700 sq feet studio to its current new home in Fo Tan.

The collection is currently housed in an industrial building in Fo Tan, its storage system is specially designed by Sky-Yutaka design studio. The relocation was part of a three-year project (2016 – 19) fully funded by Hong Kong Jockey Club to process and selectively digitise the materials. The digitised materials are part of AAA online collection and the physical materials are gradually made available for public access.

This three-year project aims to open up and develop discourses and new knowledge with practitioners from in and outside art and art historical fields through research, curatorial residencies, workshops and fellowships. It also collaborates with schools and universities to open up Ha's archive for educational purposes. By facilitating the circulation of the materials and bringing attention to their art historical values, this project aims to find a permanent home for the collection, to preserve it for the future construction of Hong Kong art history.

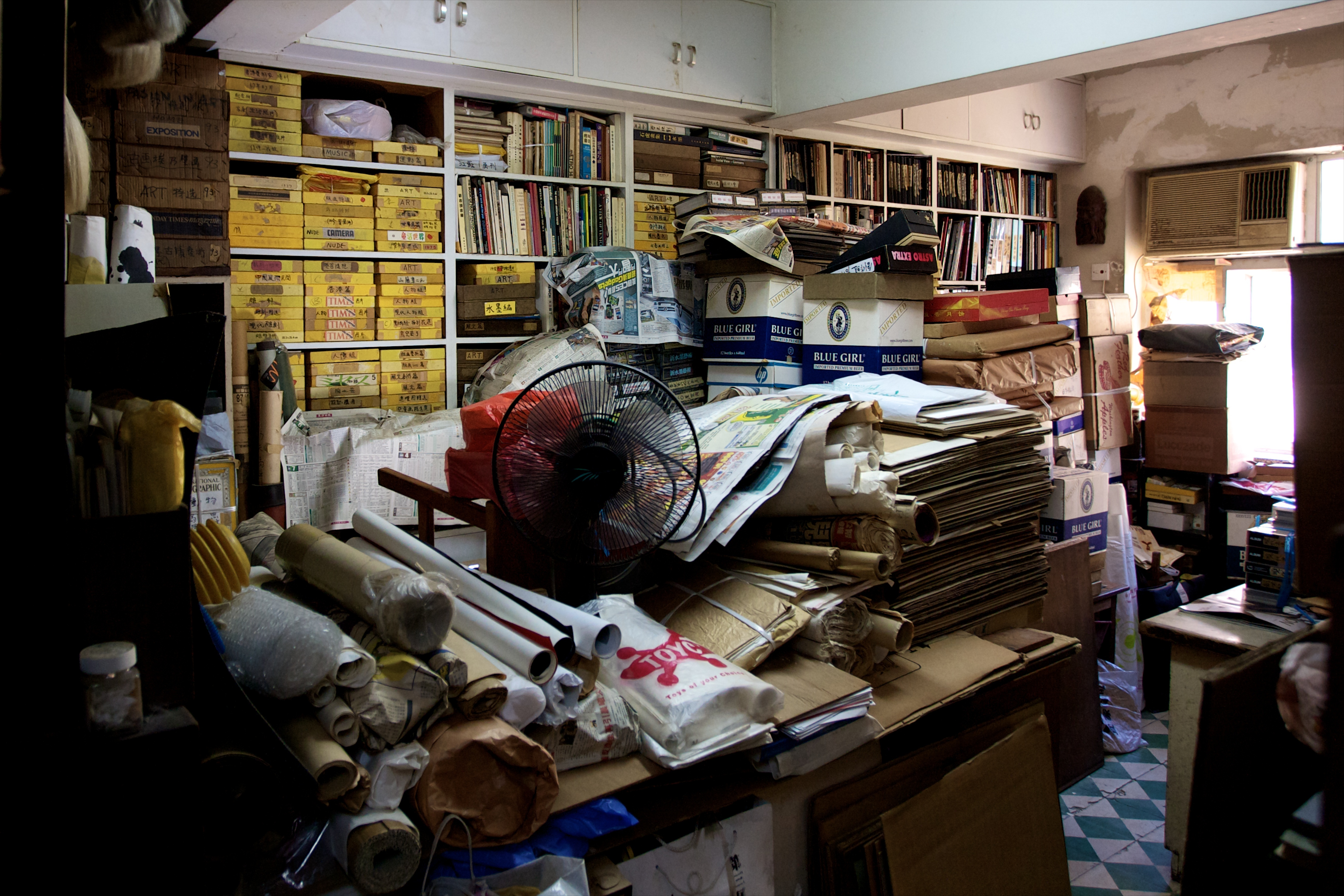
View of Ha Bik Chuen's To Kwa Wan studio, 2014

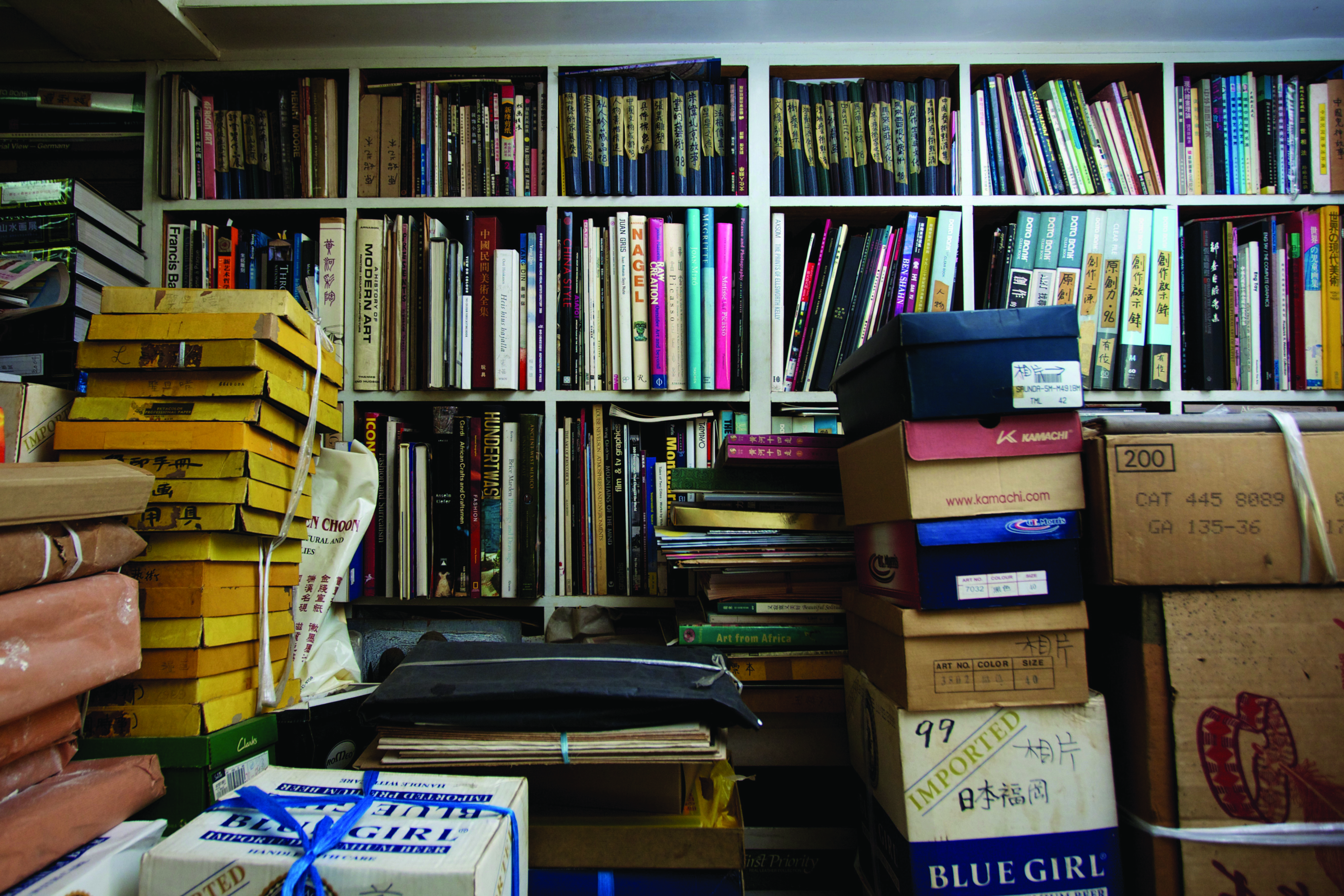
View of Ha Bik Chuen's To Kwa Wan studio, 2014

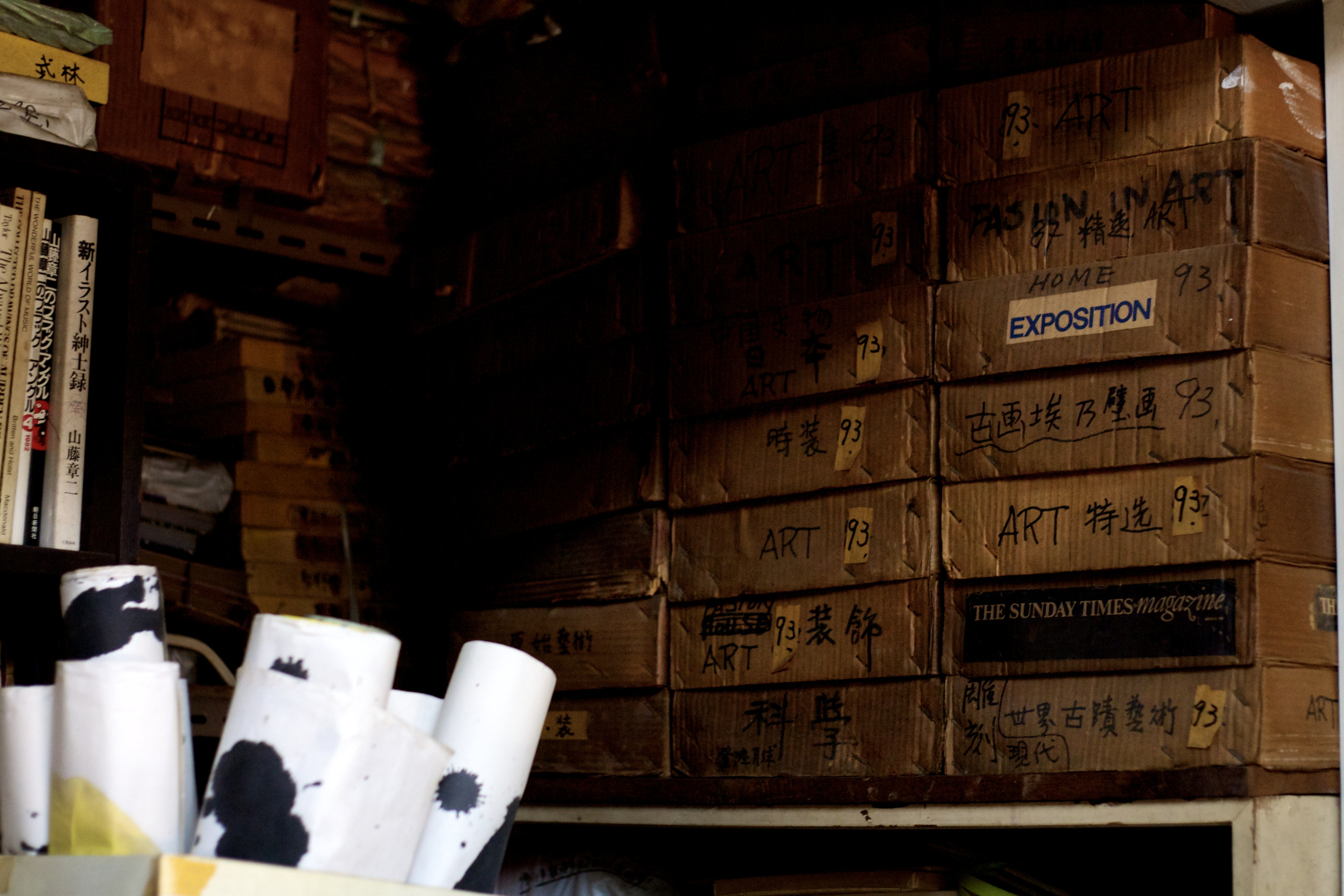
View of Ha Bik Chuen's To Kwa Wan studio, 2014

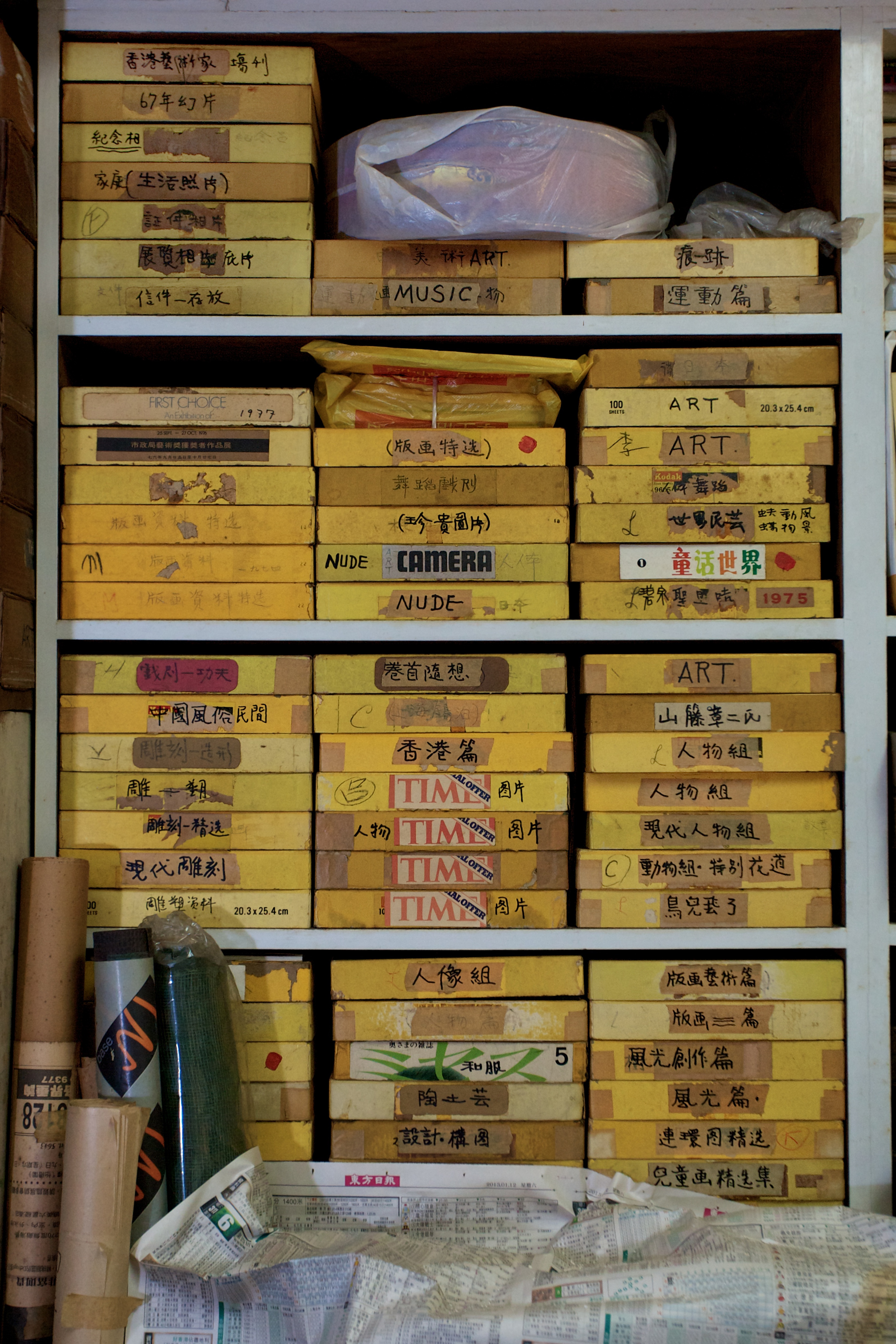
View of Ha Bik Chuen's To Kwa Wan studio, 2014

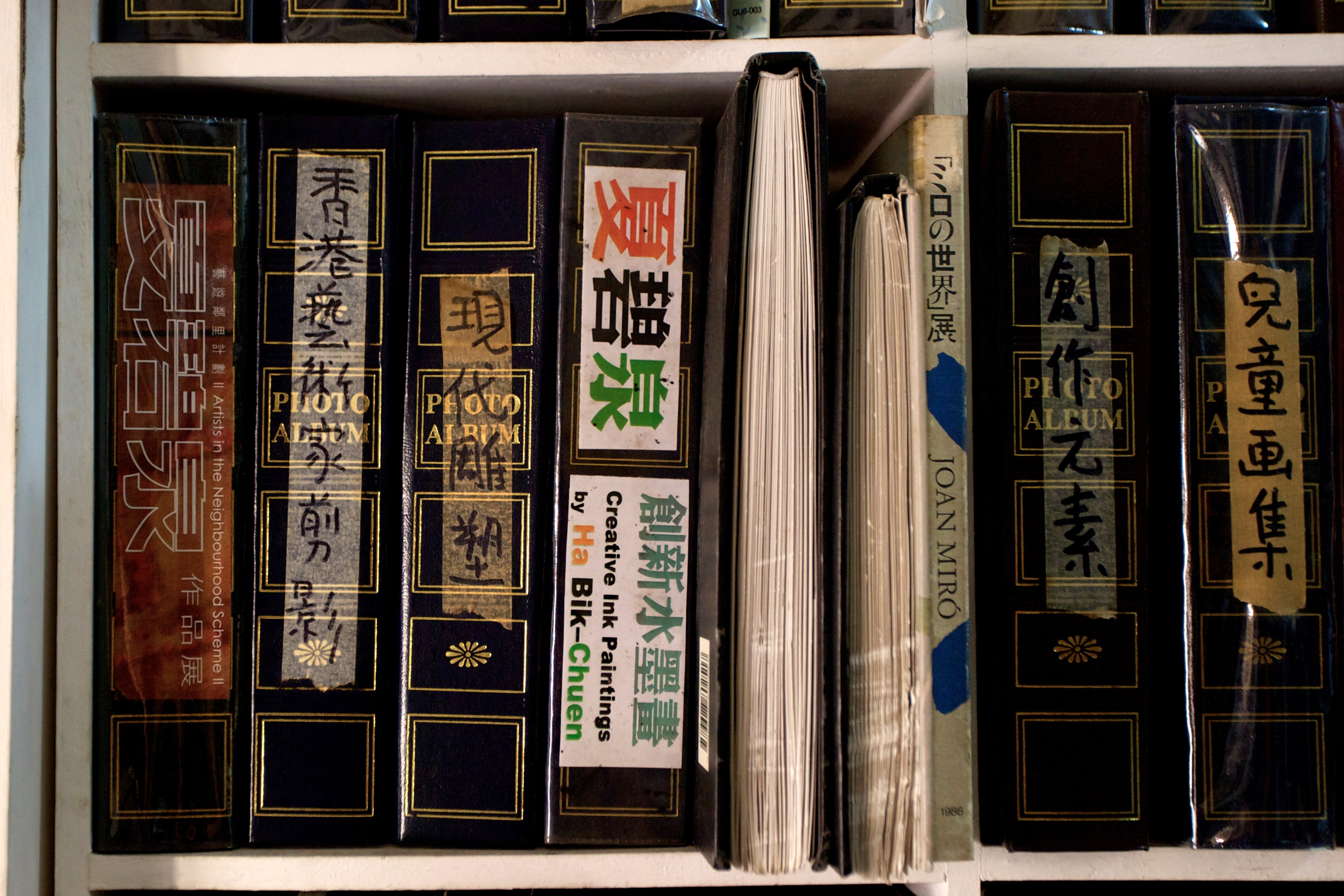
View of Ha Bik Chuen's To Kwa Wan studio, 2014

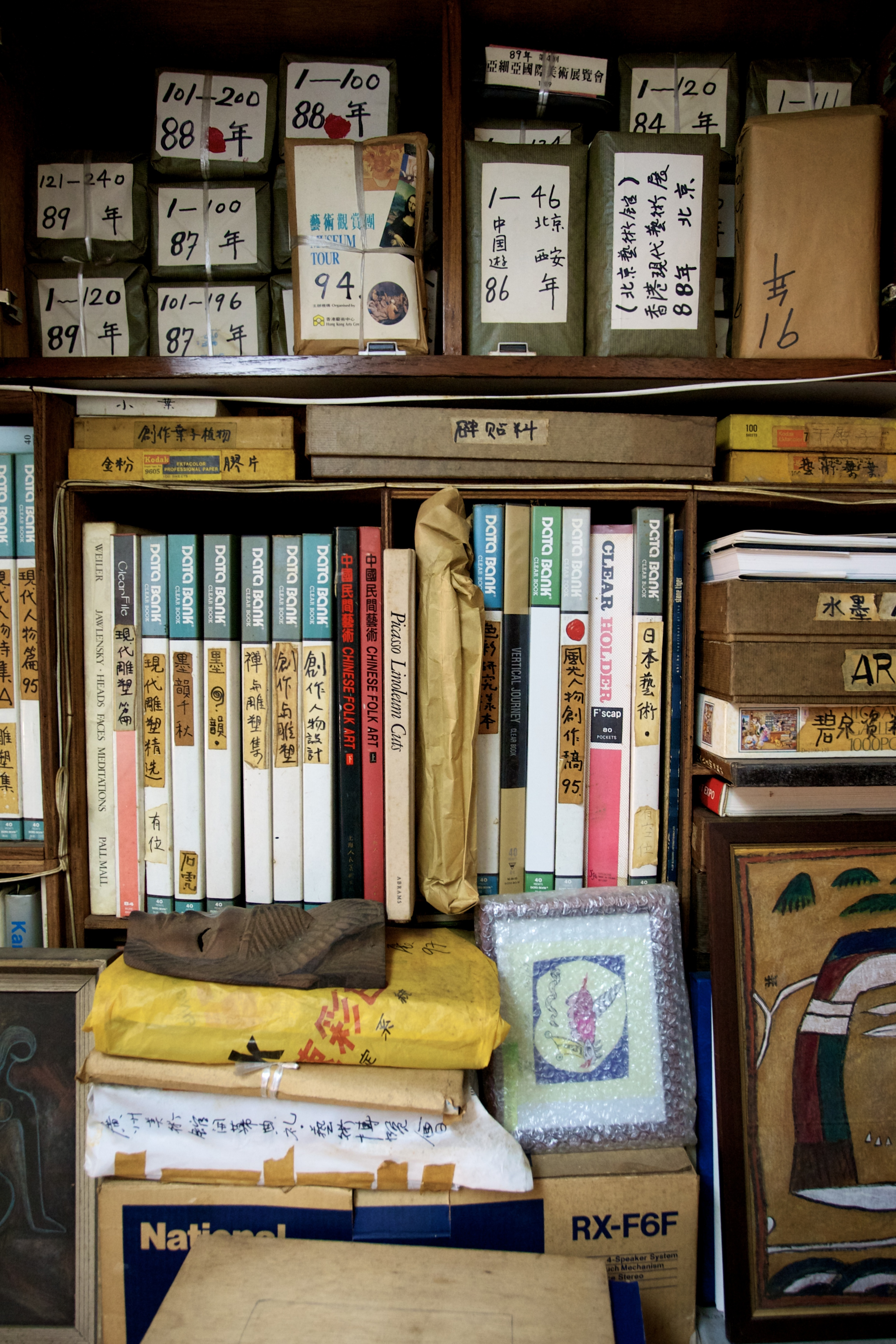
View of Ha Bik Chuen's To Kwa Wan studio, 2014

== Excessive Enthusiasm ==
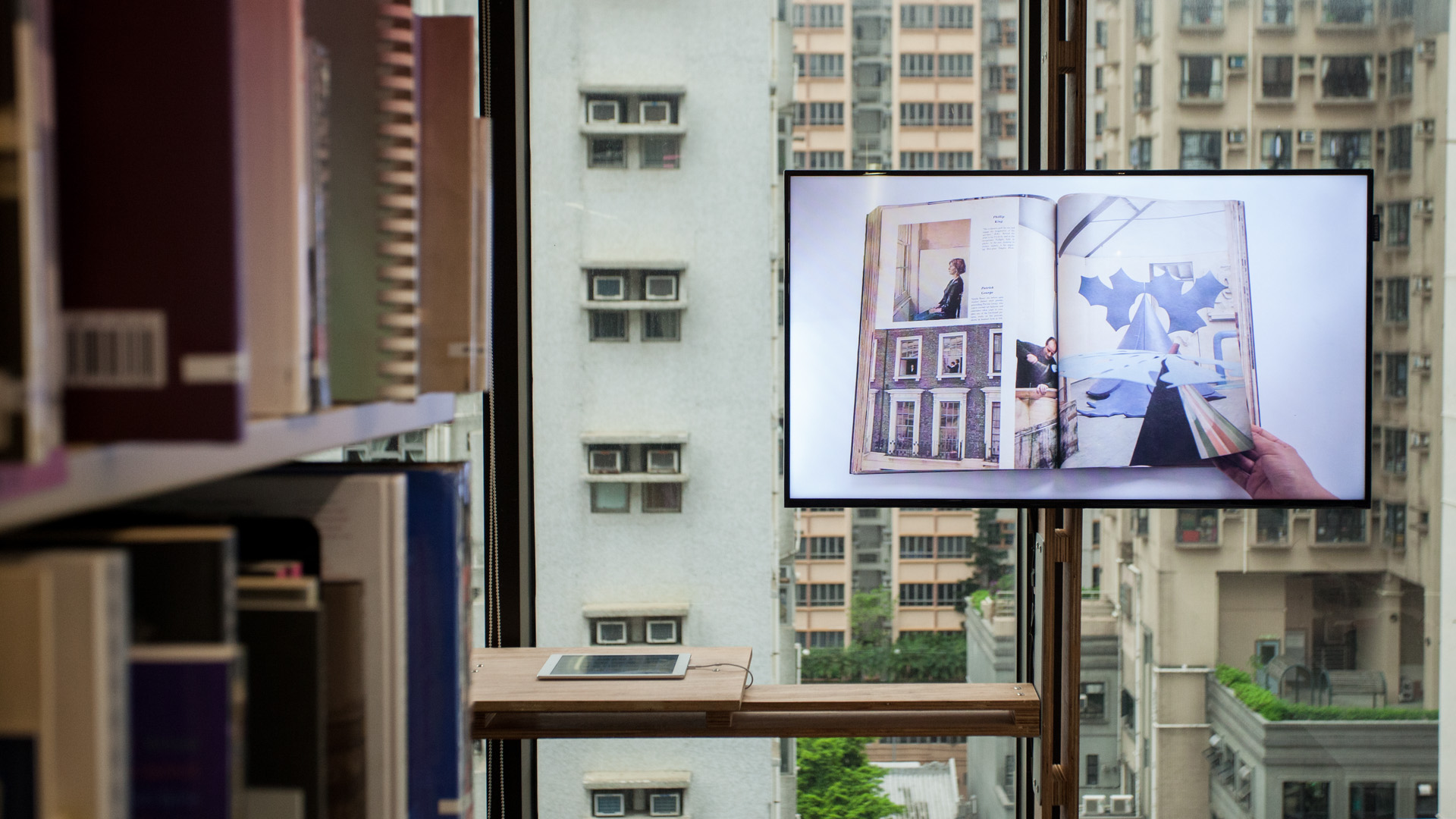
Exhibition view of Excessive Enthusiasm: Ha Bik Chuen and the Archive as Practice

From March to July 2015, Asia Art Archive hosted the exhibition Excessive Enthusiasm: Ha Bik Chuen and the Archive as Practice at its Sheung Wan library in Hong Kong. The exhibition stemmed from ongoing research into the archive of Ha Bik Chuen, and shed light on Ha's idiosyncratic system, dating back to the 1960s, that he used to organise the collected materials. A selection of original and reproduced materials from Ha's To Kwa Wan studio were exhibited including collage books, ephemeral materials, magazines, contact sheets and photos. The Hong Kong-based photographer and filmmaker Luke Casey produced a new video as part of the exhibition. The exhibition display system was designed by the architects Sarah Kwok Yan Lee and Yutaka Yano, and their students from Chinese University of Hong Kong also collaborated on the project. Based on an exhibition documented by Ha in 1977, the students reconstructed the exhibition in miniature architectural model as a way to activate the historical photographs. The local cultural practitioner Lau Kin Wah also organised public programmes in relation to the exhibition.

== Walid Raad: Section 39_Index XXXVII: Traboulsi ==
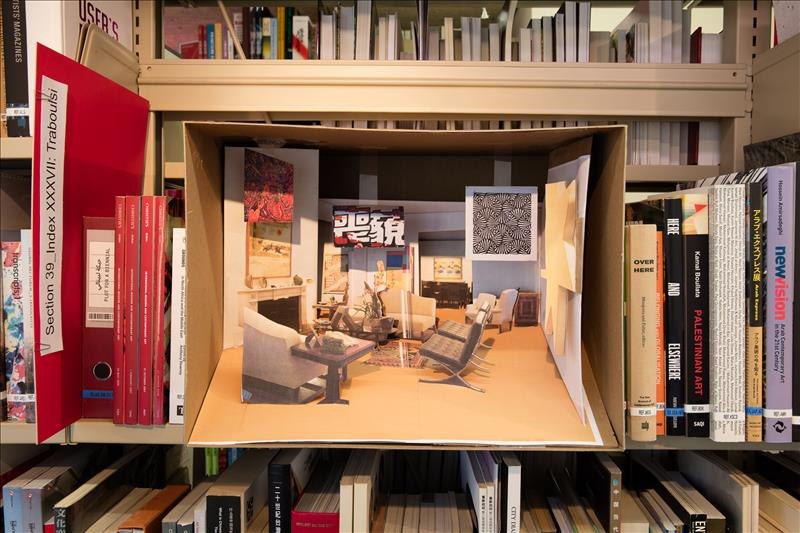
Exhibition view of Walid Raad: Section 39_Index XXXVII: Traboulsi at Asia Art Archive Library in 2016

The media artist Walid Raad was introduced to the work of Ha Bik Chuen during his 2014 residency at the Asia Art Archive. Raad immediately realised Ha's affinity to one of his fictional collaborators, Suha Traboulsi. A fictional collaboration was forged between Traboulsi and Ha, which resulted in the exhibition Section 39_Index XXXVII: Traboulsi in 2016 at the AAA library,

‘Between 1967 and 2009, Hong Kong-based artist Ha Bik Chuen collaborated with the Beirut-based artist Suha Traboulsi on a number of projects. Most of these remained out of view until 2010, after Ha's death, when his archives were unpacked and studied. The two met in 1962 when Traboulsi travelled to Hong Kong to research Chinese calligraphic practices. They struck an immediate friendship that soon turned into an artistic collaboration from afar: Ha in Hong Kong and Traboulsi in Beirut.

For Section 39_Index XXXVII: Traboulsi at the AAA Library, works from two collaborative series are on display: 'Editor’s Introduction' (1972–1980) and 'Notes' (1983–2009).'Editor's Introduction' consists of several 'sculptural spaces' built by Traboulsi and inspired by Ha's ephemera-laden collage books. 'Notes' consists of Traboulsi's reproductions of canonical modern paintings by Arab artists: Inji Efflatoun, Abdel Hadi el-Gazzar, Hamed Nada, Ibrahim el-Salahi, Marwan, Seta Manoukian, among others. The Traboulsi reproductions were scattered among several of Ha's collaged notebooks. Traboulsi never revealed where her productions were strewn, and it has taken several years of painstaking archival research to reassemble some of her paintings shown here.’

– Walid Raad

== Selected exhibition records ==
=== Solo exhibitions ===
1979 Shaw Rimmington Gallery, Toronto, Canada

1979 Printmakers Art Gallery, Taipei

1981 Photographs Thinking of Sculpture, Hong Kong Arts Centre

1983 Hui Arts Gallery, Minnesota, United States

1986 Alisan Fine Arts, Hong Kong

1991 Hanart T Z Gallery, Taipei

1992 Hong Kong Artists Series : Ha Bik-Chuen, Hong Kong Museum of Art

1994 Hanart T Z Gallery, Hong Kong

1997 Ha Bik-chuen- Sentient Beings: Solo Exhibitions of Relief Prints, China Oil Painting Gallery, Hong Kong

=== Group exhibitions ===
1969,1972,1975 Contemporary Hong Kong Art Exhibition, City Museum and Art Gallery, Hong Kong

1976, 1978, 1980 Norwegian International Print Biennial, Norway

1976 Urban Council Fine Arts Award Winners Exhibition, Hong Kong Museum of Art

1977 Contemporary Hong Kong Art Exhibition, Hong Kong Museum of Art

1978 The 6th International Biennial of Graphic Art, Firenze-Prato, Italy

1979–1983,1989 Contemporary Hong Kong Art Biennial Exhibition, Hong Kong Museum of Art

1984 Contemporary Open Air Sculpture, The Pizza of the Hong Kong Coliseum

1985 The Sculpture Show, Hong Kong Exchange Square

1991 The 5th International Biennial Print Exhibition, Taipei Fine Arts Museum

1992 The 10th Norwegian International Print Triennale, Norway

1997 Reunion and Vision - Contemporary Hong Kong Art 1997, Hong Kong Museum of Art

1997 Hong Kong Art 1997, National Museum of Fine Arts, Beijing; Guangdong Museum of Art, Guangzhou

=== Awards ===
1975 Urban Council Fine Art Awards (Sculpture and Print)

1978 First Prize Winner at the Aberdeen Centre Sculpture Design Competition, Hong Kong

1991 The Artist of the Year Awards 1991 (Printmaker of the year)

1993 Bronze medal, The 1st Print Exhibition, Xi'an

1996 Lu Xun Prize of Print, Chinese Print-makers Association

1997 Fellowship for Artistic Development, Hong Kong Arts Development Council
