= Lui Shou-Kwan =

Chinese painter

- 呂壽琨 (Lü Shoukun)
- Born: 1919; Guangzhou, China
- Died: 1975 (aged 55–56)
- Education: Guangzhou University
- Movement: Hong Kong New Ink Movement
- Awards: Member of the British Empire (1971)

Lui Shou-Kwan (Chinese: 呂壽琨 (Lü Shoukun); 1919–1975) was a Chinese painter, one of the most prominent ink painters of the 20th century and a founder of the Hong Kong New Ink Movement.

== Early life ==
Lui was born in Guangzhou. His father, Lui Can Ming, was also a painter. He studied economics at Guangzhou University.

He moved to Hong Kong in 1948. While there, he worked as an inspector for the Hongkong and Yaumati Ferry Company until 1966.

== Art and academic career ==
Lui was active in organising Hong Kong art societies, alongside Chao Shao-an. In 1956, he was a founding member of the Hong Kong Chung Kok Chinese Art Club.

From 25 May to 4 July 1962, Lui's work was exhibited at the major exhibition, Hong Kong Art Today, at Hong Kong City Hall Museum and Art Gallery (later renamed Hong Kong Museum of Art in 1975). It was significant as the first exhibition with Hong Kong art as its theme. The exhibition also reflected how naturalism in art had become passé and that abstract art was favoured at that moment in time.

He became an honorary adviser to the Hong Kong Museum of Art in 1962. In 1964, his paintings appeared in the Hong Kong Museum of Art.

He taught ink painting at the University of Hong Kong's Department of Architecture, and also taught at the Chinese University of Hong Kong's Department of Extra-Mural Studies in 1966. In 1968, he worked with his students to form the Tao Art Association. Lui taught prominent artists like Wucius Wong and Gu Mei.

Lui was one of those attempting to bring Western modernism into Chinese art, making note of how artists like Franz Kline and Robert Motherwell were inspired by Asian calligraphy. Despite his admiration of modernism, he was also inspired by the traditional style of Huang Banruo (Wong Po-Yeh).

In 1971, Lui was awarded an MBE for his contributions to the arts. He is most known for his "Zen" series of abstract paintings, created from the 1960s until his death. The paintings make use of philosophical and spiritual symbolism, showing Taoist and Buddhist motifs like the lotus and flames.

== Legacy ==
Lui's paintings have appeared in multiple auctions by Christie's.

In 2018, Oxford's Ashmolean Museum hosted an exhibition on Lui, calling him "one of the most significant artists in Hong Kong during the mid-twentieth century".

== Selected works ==
=== Books ===
- A Study of Chinese Paintings (1956)

=== Paintings ===
- Zen (1968)
- Purity (1970)
