= Hong Kong Museum of Art =

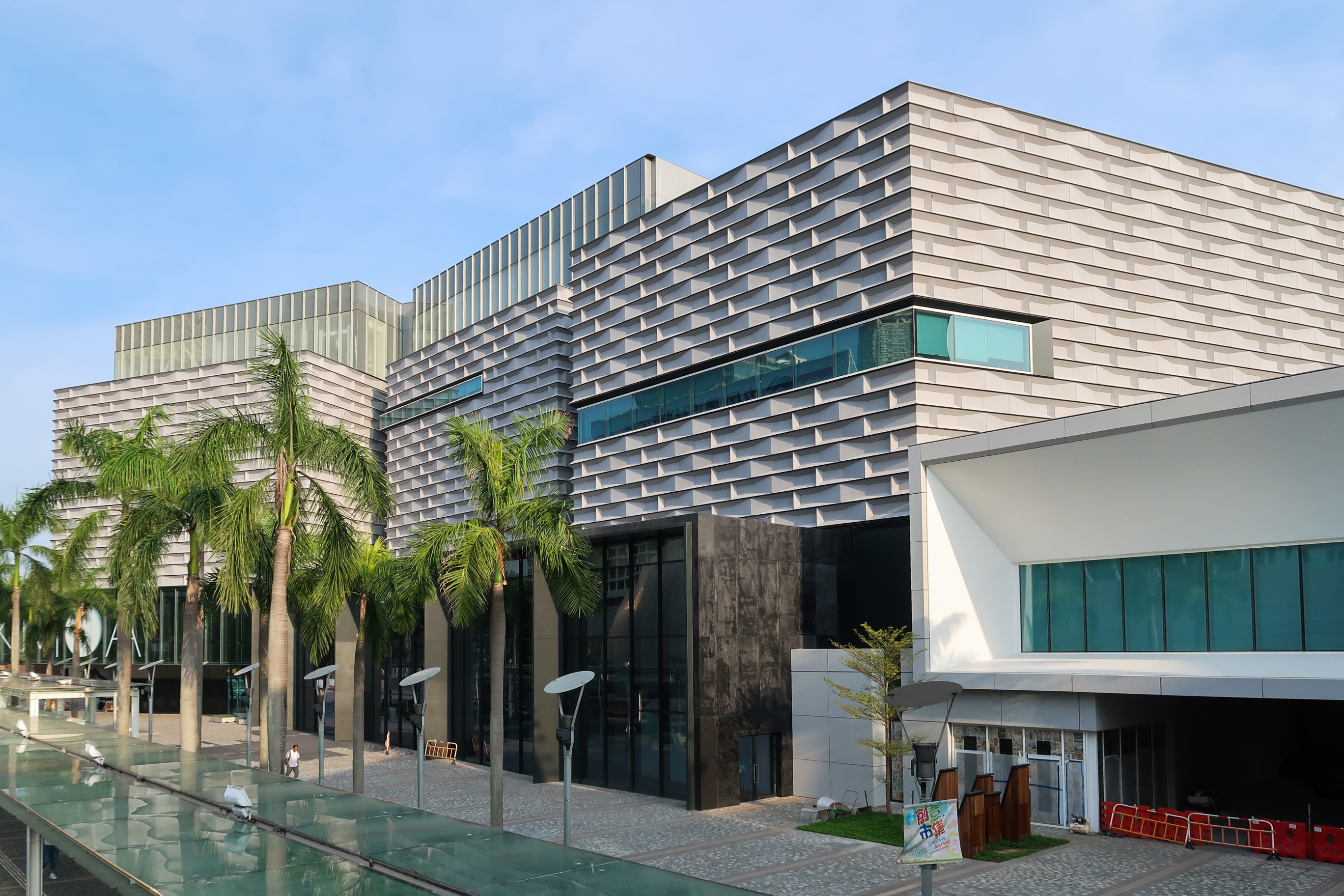
- The HKMoA in August 2019
- Interactive fullscreen map
- Former name: City Hall Museum and Art Gallery
- Established: 2 March 1962; 64 years ago
- Location: 10 Salisbury Road, Tsim Sha Tsui, Kowloon, Hong Kong
- Coordinates: 22°17′37″N 114°10′19″E
- Type: Art museum
- Collection size: 19,700 (2026)
- Visitors: 1.69 million (2025)
- Director: Maria Mok Kar-wing
- Curators: Prudence Ma Pui-ting, Hilda Mak Wing-man, Bernadette Mok Yun-tai, Nadia Lau Sheung-ying, Twiggy Au Pik-hung
- Owner: Leisure and Cultural Services Department
- Public transit access: Tsim Sha Tsui station (Exit E); East Tsim Sha Tsui station (Exit J)
- Website: hk.art.museum

Hong Kong Museum of Art
- Traditional Chinese: 香港藝術館
- Simplified Chinese: 香港艺术馆
Transcriptions
Standard Mandarin
- Hanyu Pinyin: xiang1 gang3 yi4 shu4 guan3
Yue: Cantonese
- Jyutping: hoeng1 gong2 ngai6 seot6 gun2

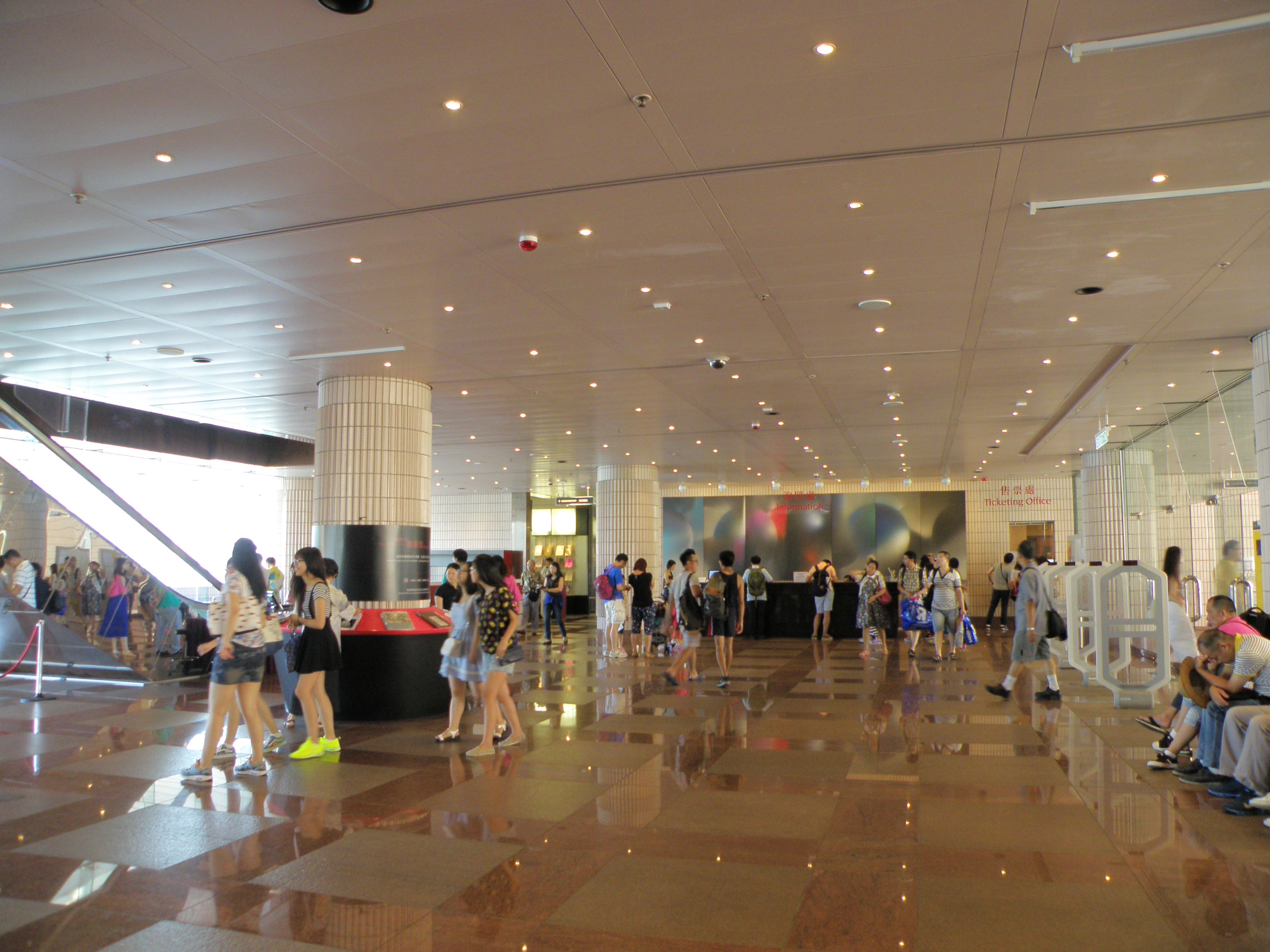
Entrance Hall of the museum

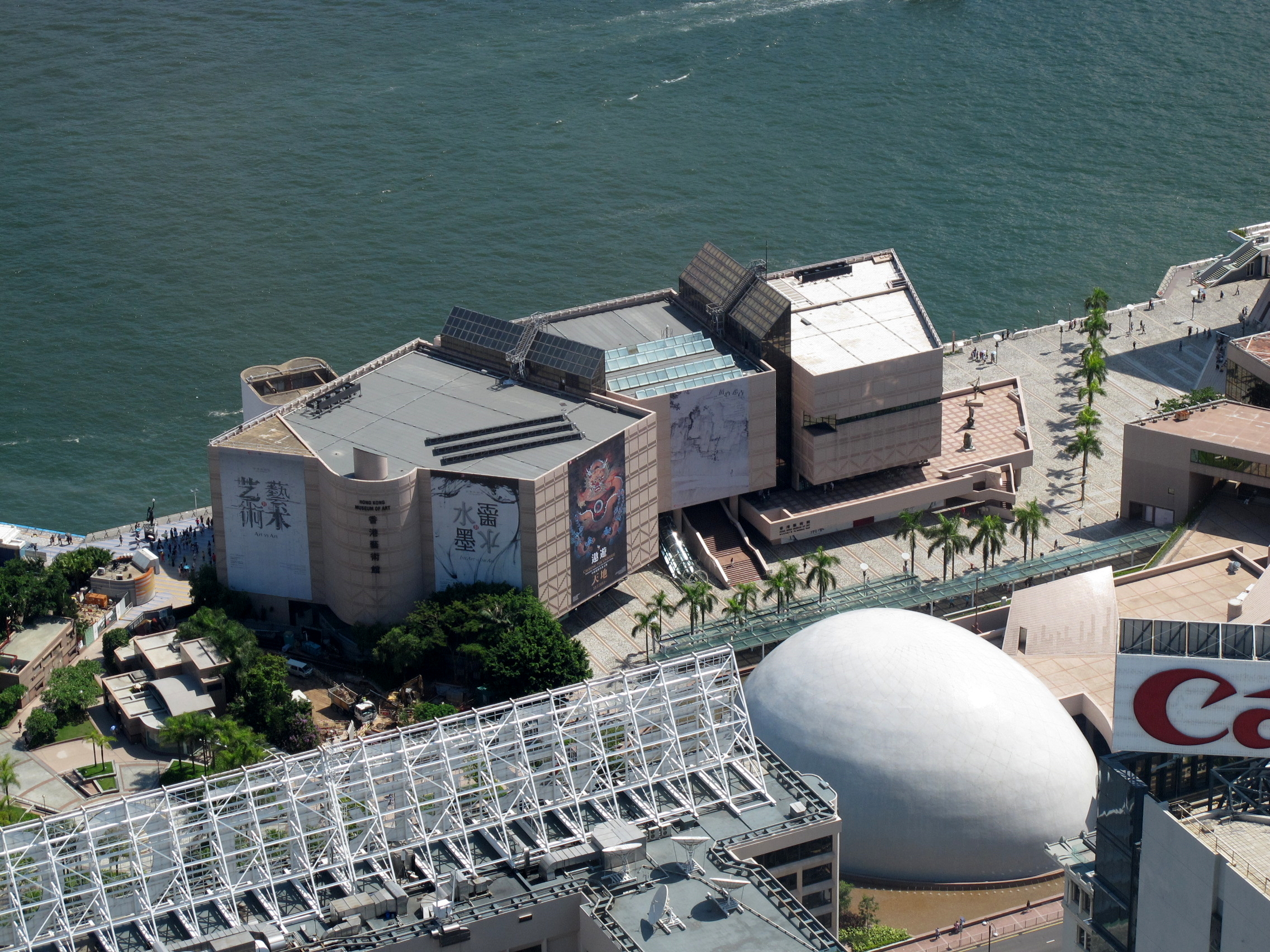
Hong Kong Museum of Art before renovation

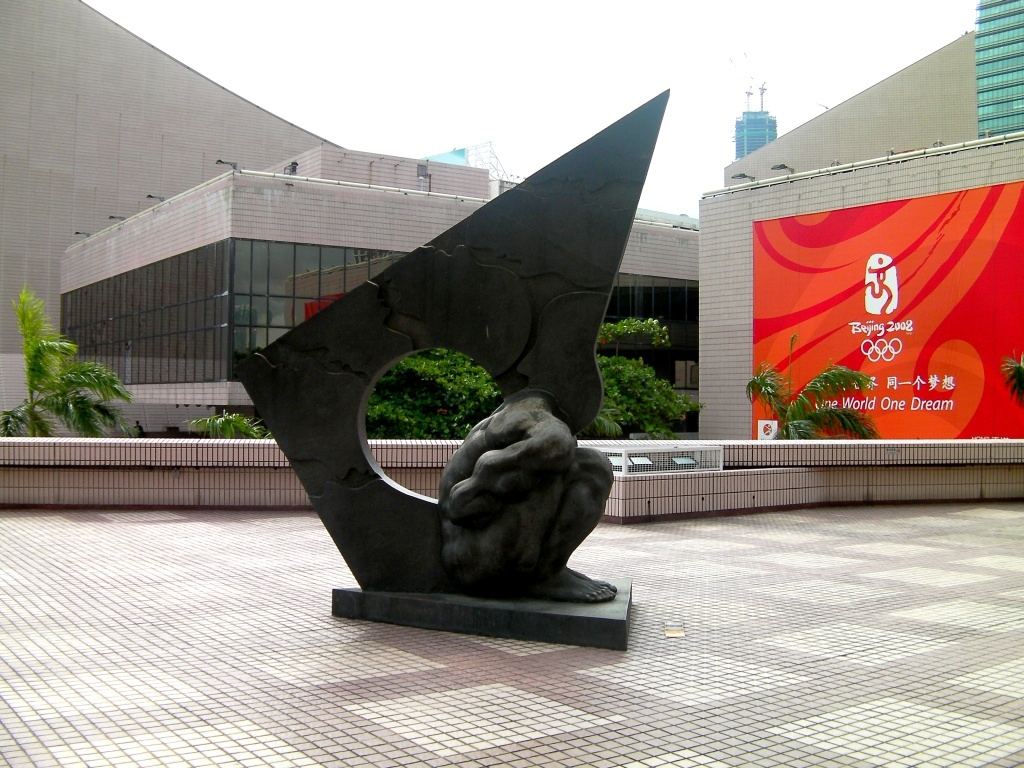
Sculpture in grounds of HK Museum of Art

The Hong Kong Museum of Art (HKMoA) is the first and main art museum of Hong Kong, located on Salisbury Road, Tsim Sha Tsui. It is a public museum managed by the Leisure and Cultural Services Department of the Hong Kong Government.

The HKMoA has an art collection of almost 20,000 items, and admission is free for permanent exhibitions. Its rival is the non-government-managed Hong Kong Arts Centre. These are considered to be the top two art museums in Hong Kong that dictate its discourse of art.

It has an extended branch, the Flagstaff House Museum of Tea Ware, at the Hong Kong Park in Central.

== History ==
The museum was established as the City Hall Museum and Art Gallery in the City Hall in Central by the Urban Council on 2 March 1962. This was split into the Hong Kong Museum of History (HKMH) and the HKMoA in July 1975, the latter of which had since continued to occupy the rear portion of the 8th and the entire 9th to 11th stories of the High Block; these floors now house a public library. The HKMH soon relocated to Kowloon Park in 1983.

In 1991, the HKMoA moved out of the City Hall and was relocated to its present premises at 10 Salisbury Road, near the Hong Kong Cultural Centre and the Hong Kong Space Museum, in Tsim Sha Tsui. It was formally inaugurated by then Governor Chris Patten on 11 September 1992.

On 3 August 2015, the museum closed for a $400 million expansion and renovation and eventually reopened four years later on 30 November 2019.

== Exhibitions ==
The HKMoA rotates its displays and exhibitions regularly. These are mainly of paintings, calligraphy and sculptures from Hong Kong, mainland China, and other parts of the world. It has cooperated with other museums as well.

From 25 May to 4 July 1962, the museum (then still named the Hong Kong City Hall Museum and Art Gallery) held the major exhibition, Hong Kong Art Today. It was significant as the first exhibition with Hong Kong art as its theme, and also reflected how naturalism in art had become passé and that abstract art was favoured at that moment in time.

Since 1975, the museum has hosted the Hong Kong Art Biennial Exhibition featuring the work of contemporary Hong Kong artists. It was renamed the Hong Kong Contemporary Art Biennial Awards in 2009.

== Transportation ==
The HKMoA is within walking distance from Exit J of East Tsim Sha Tsui station and Exit E of Tsim Sha Tsui station of the Mass Transit Railway (MTR). It is even closer to the Tsim Sha Tsui Ferry Pier, with services to Wan Chai and Central.

== See also ==
- List of museums in Hong Kong
