= Wo Hing Society Hall =

- Wo Hing Society Building
- U.S. National Register of Historic Places
- Hawaiʻi Register of Historic Places
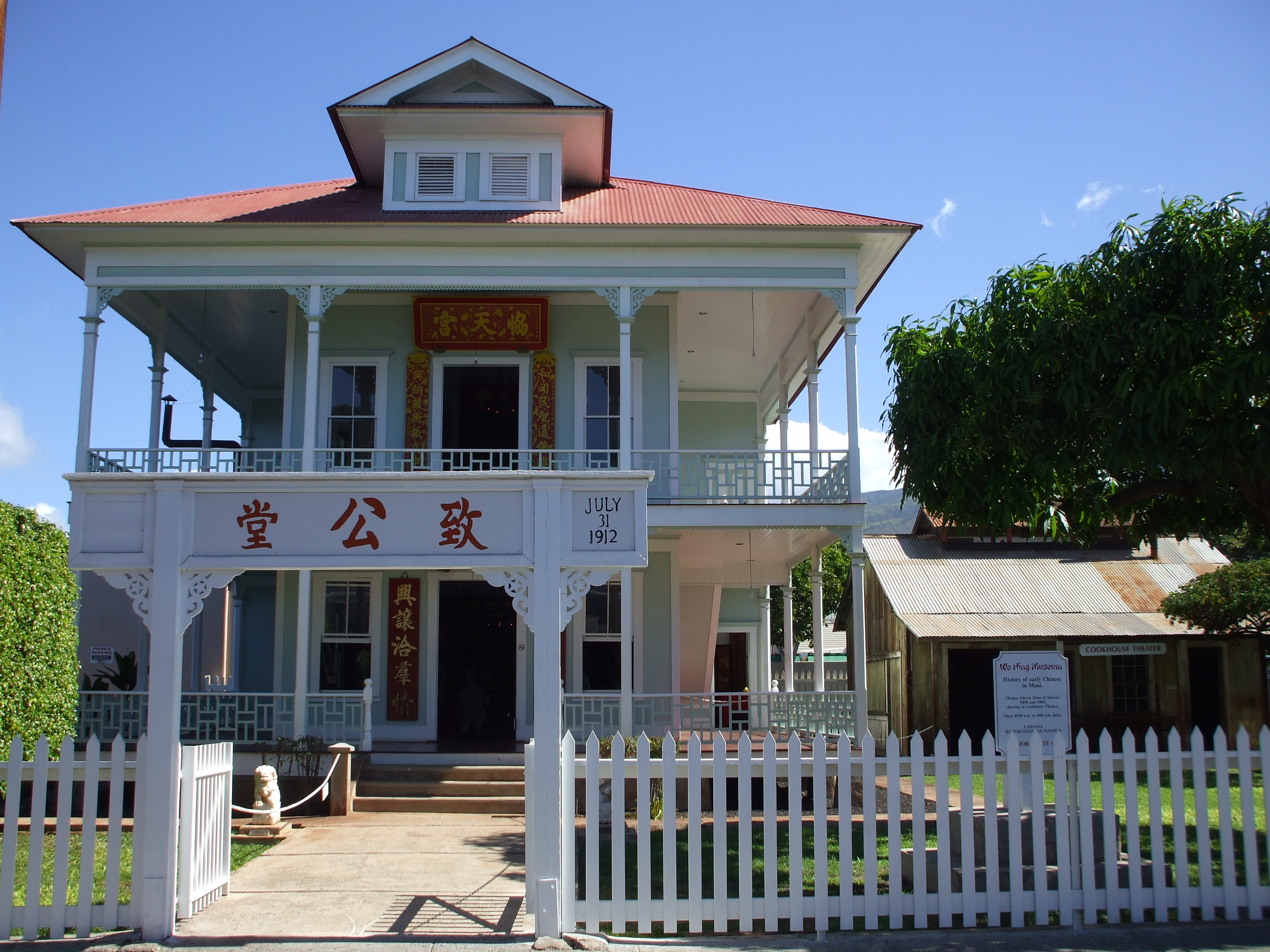
- Front facade and entrance, October 2007.

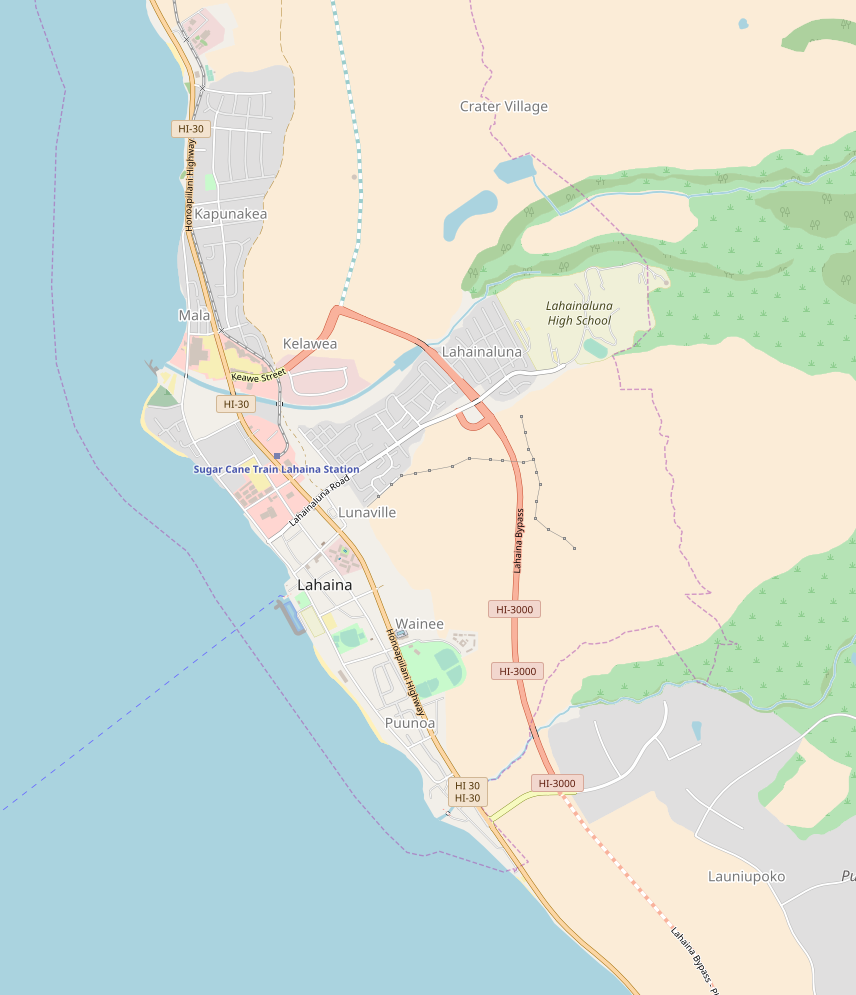
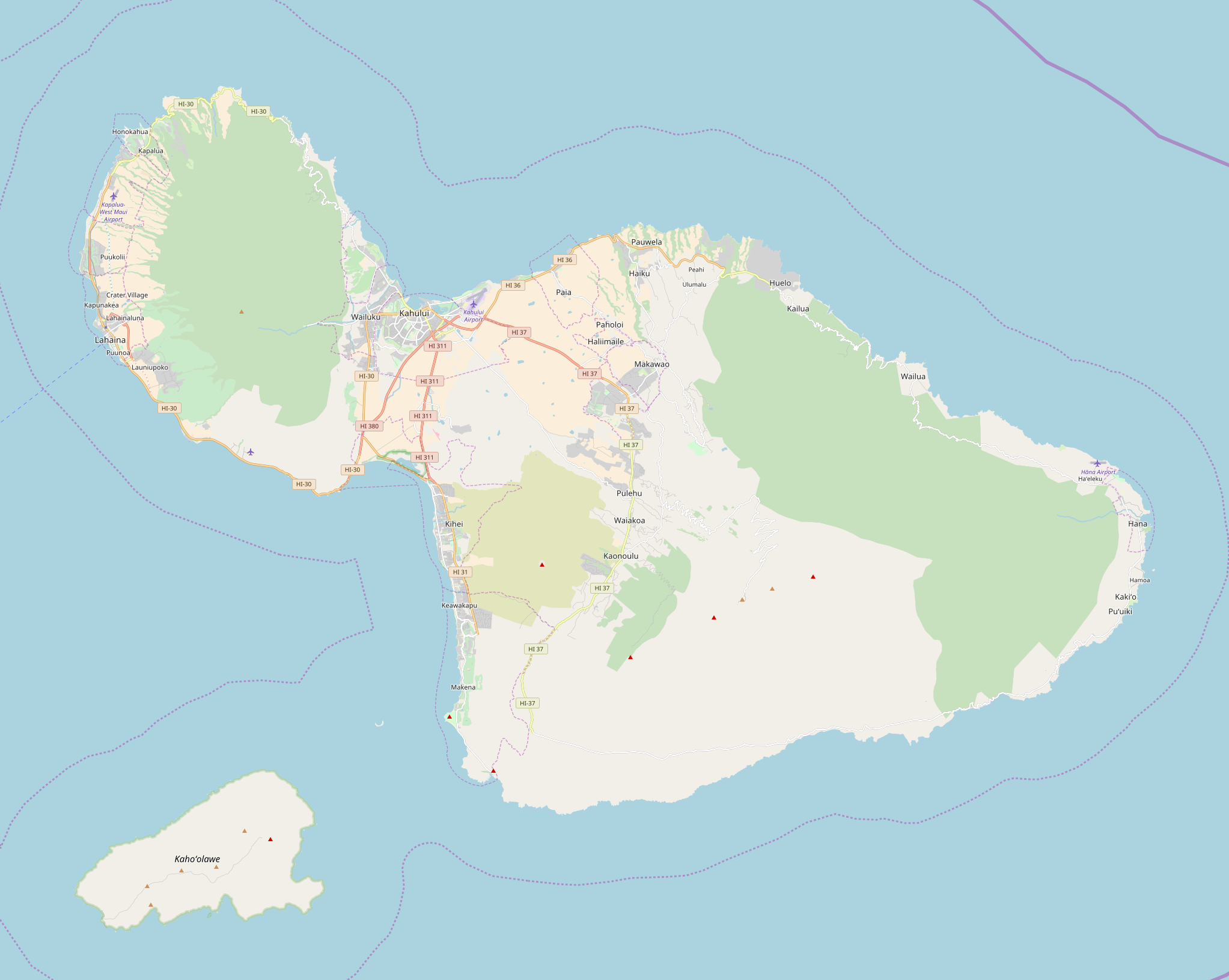
- Location within Lahaina, Hawaii Location within Maui Location within Hawaii
- Location: 848 Front St., Lahaina, Hawaii
- Coordinates: 20°52′35″N 156°40′49.6″W
- Built: 1912
- Architect: Chee Kung Tong Fraternal Society
- Architectural style: Chinese Feng Shui principles
- MPS: Chinese Tong Houses of Maui Island TR
- NRHP reference No.: 82000173
- HRHP No.: 50-50-10-01615

Significant dates
- Added to NRHP: November 15, 1982
- Designated HRHP: July 30, 1982

The Wo Hing Society Hall (Chinese: 和興會館; Jyutping: Wo4 Hing1 Wui6 Gun2) was a building located at 858 Front Street in the Lahaina Historic District in Lahaina, Hawaii. Built around 1912, it served the growing Chinese population centered in Lahaina, primarily those working in the sugarcane industry as a social and fraternal hall for the Wo Hing Society. By the 1940s the declining Chinese population in Lahaina slowly made the building redundant and the property was neglected.

In 1983, the Lahaina Restoration Foundation worked with the Wo Hing Society to restore the building to its former appearance. After restoration and construction in 1984, the museum was opened to the public. It operated under the name Wo Hing Museum and was one of only two existing Chinese Society Halls on Maui. It was placed on the Hawaii State Register of Historic Places on July 30, 1982, and, as Wo Hing Society Building, was placed on the National Register of Historic Places on November 15, 1982.

In August 2023, Wo Hing Society Hall was destroyed by the 2023 Hawaii wildfires.

== History ==
In 1852, many Chinese were brought to work on Hawaii's sugarcane plantations, mainly single men. When their contracts expired, some stayed behind and took up other trades. Due to the influx and distance from mainland China, Chinese Tong societies sprouted up to provide Chinese religious and political help, in addition to mutual aid, friendship, and funerary benefits upon death.

Sometime around 1909, the Chinese in Lahaina formed the Wo Hing Society, an offshoot of the Chee Kung Tong. Using private donations and funds, in 1912, the Wo Hing Society Hall was erected.

By the 1940s, many of the Chinese in Lahaina pursued new business opportunities in Honolulu. This led to the property being left derelict and prey to termites and rot. In 1983, the Lahaina Restoration Foundation approached the Wo Hing Society and entered into a long-term agreement to help restore the building and open it to the public. Restoration was completed in 1984, and was open to the public. It was considered to be one of the finest surviving Chinese Tong Society Halls in the State of Hawaii.

== Buildings ==
The site was split up into a main building with two floors and a cookhouse to the side. The first floor of the main building housed a collection of Chinese artifacts and memorabilia of Lahaina around the start of the 20th century. Most covered the years after sugarcane established itself on the west side of Maui. The second floor featured the only public Taoist temple on Maui. Altars dedicated to Lord Guan and other Chinese Deities were on the second floor, with a selection of other Chinese artifacts. The cookhouse was a separate structure, created as a precaution to prevent the risk of fire damage to the main Wo Hing Temple. Later, along with displaying numerous cooking artifacts, it was converted into a mini theater. One highlight was the showing of films of Hawaii taken by Thomas Edison in 1898 and 1906.

== Etymology and culture ==
Wo Hing (Chinese: 和興; Jyutping: wo4 hing1) literally means "harmony and prosperity" (Wo = Peace and Harmony, Hing = Prosperity) This was reflected on calligraphy boards around the temple. The temple also utilized Feng Shui principles, with the entrance (or front) of the building facing the ocean, and its back to the mountains.

== Register of Historic Places placement dates ==
- Hawaii State Register of Historic Places - July 30, 1982 Site #50-03-1615 Chinese Society Halls thematic group
- National Register of Historic Places - November 15, 1982 #82000173 Chinese Tong Houses of Maui Island TR

== Gallery ==
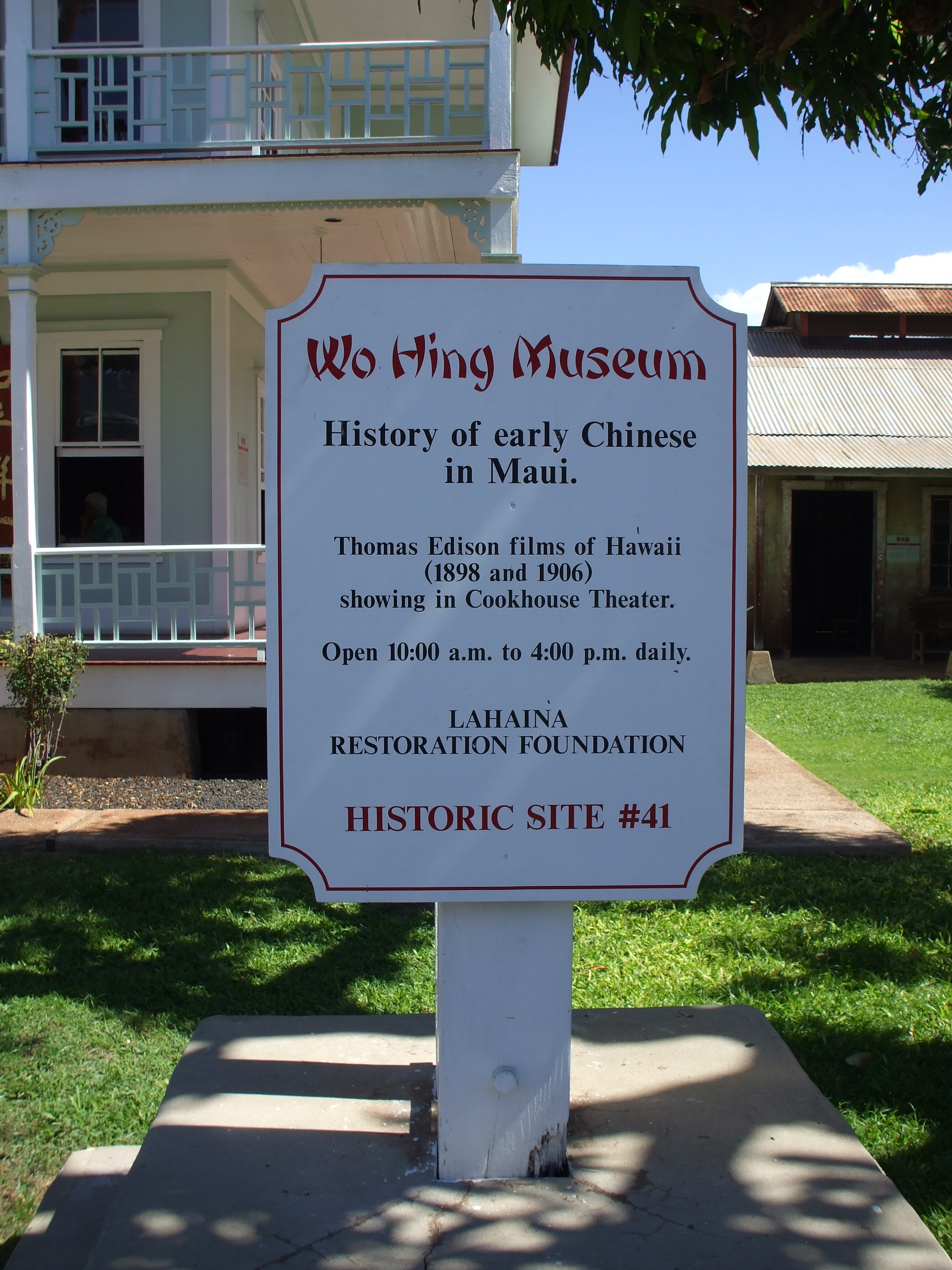
Marker in front of the Museum identifying it as Site #41 of the Lahaina Restoration Foundation.

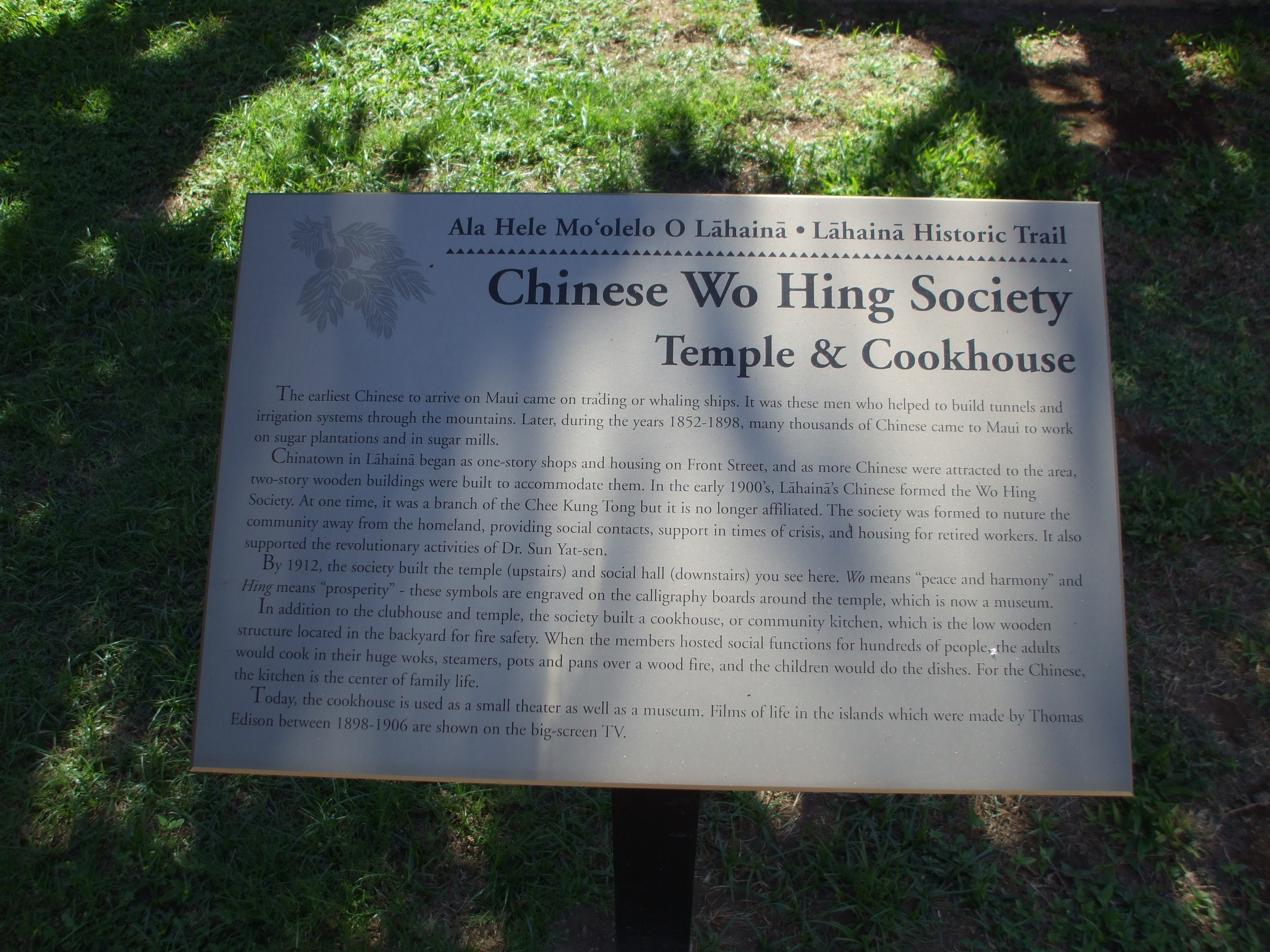
Information Plaque in front of the museum.

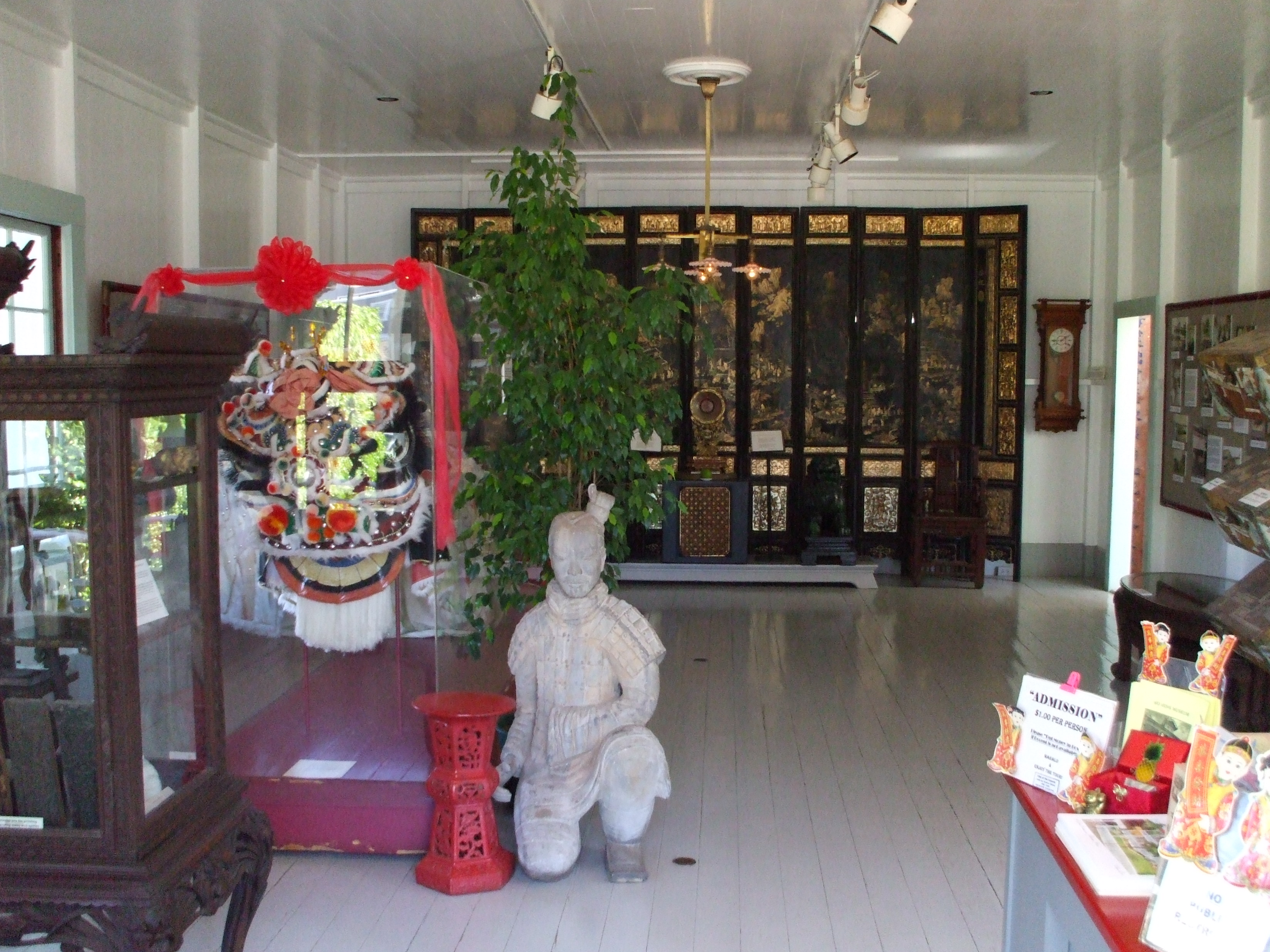
First Floor.

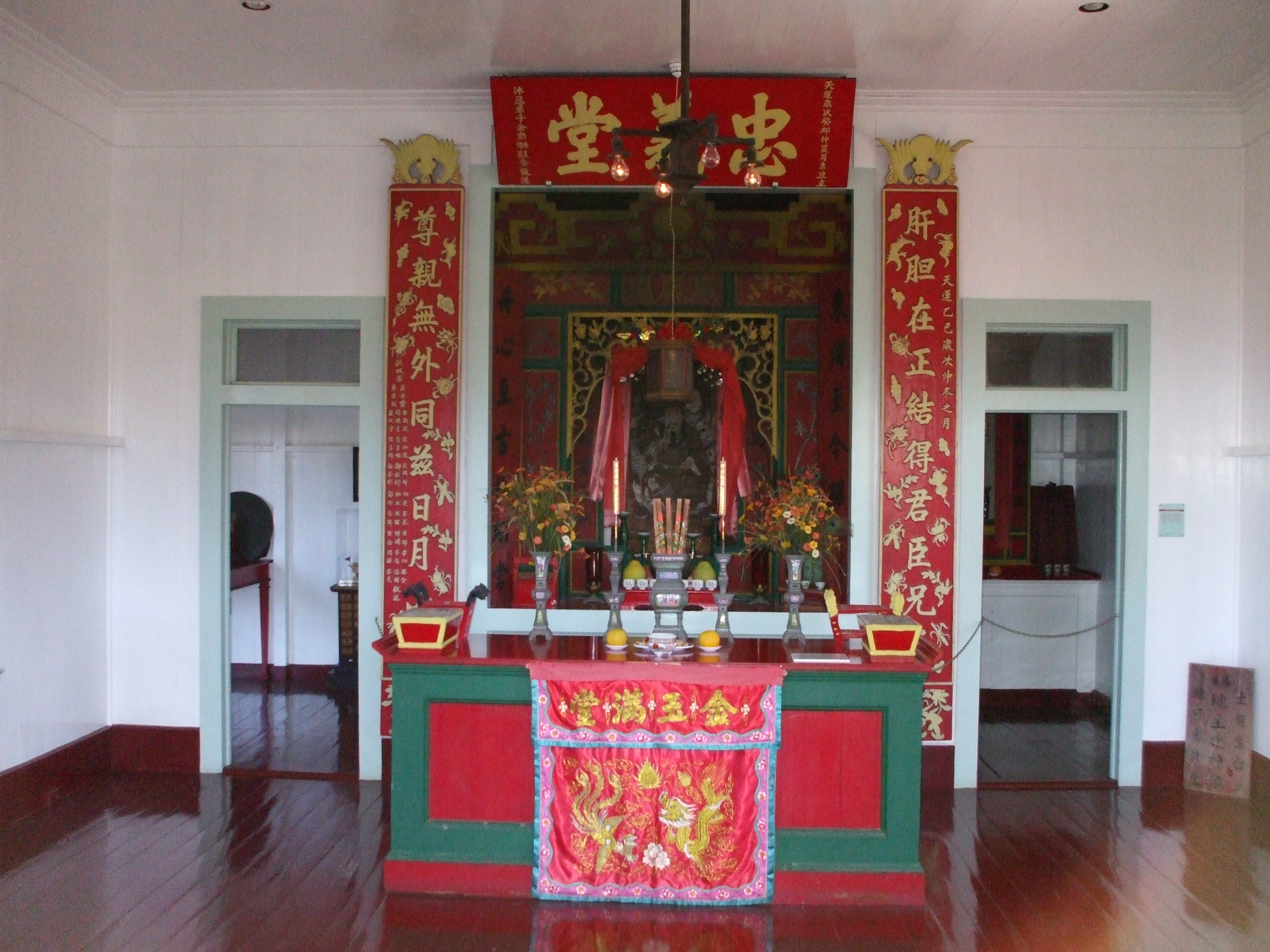
Second Floor Altar to Lord Guan. Other guardian Deities altars are to the left and right of the photo. An altar to the deceased is to the right of the photo behind the chain barricade.

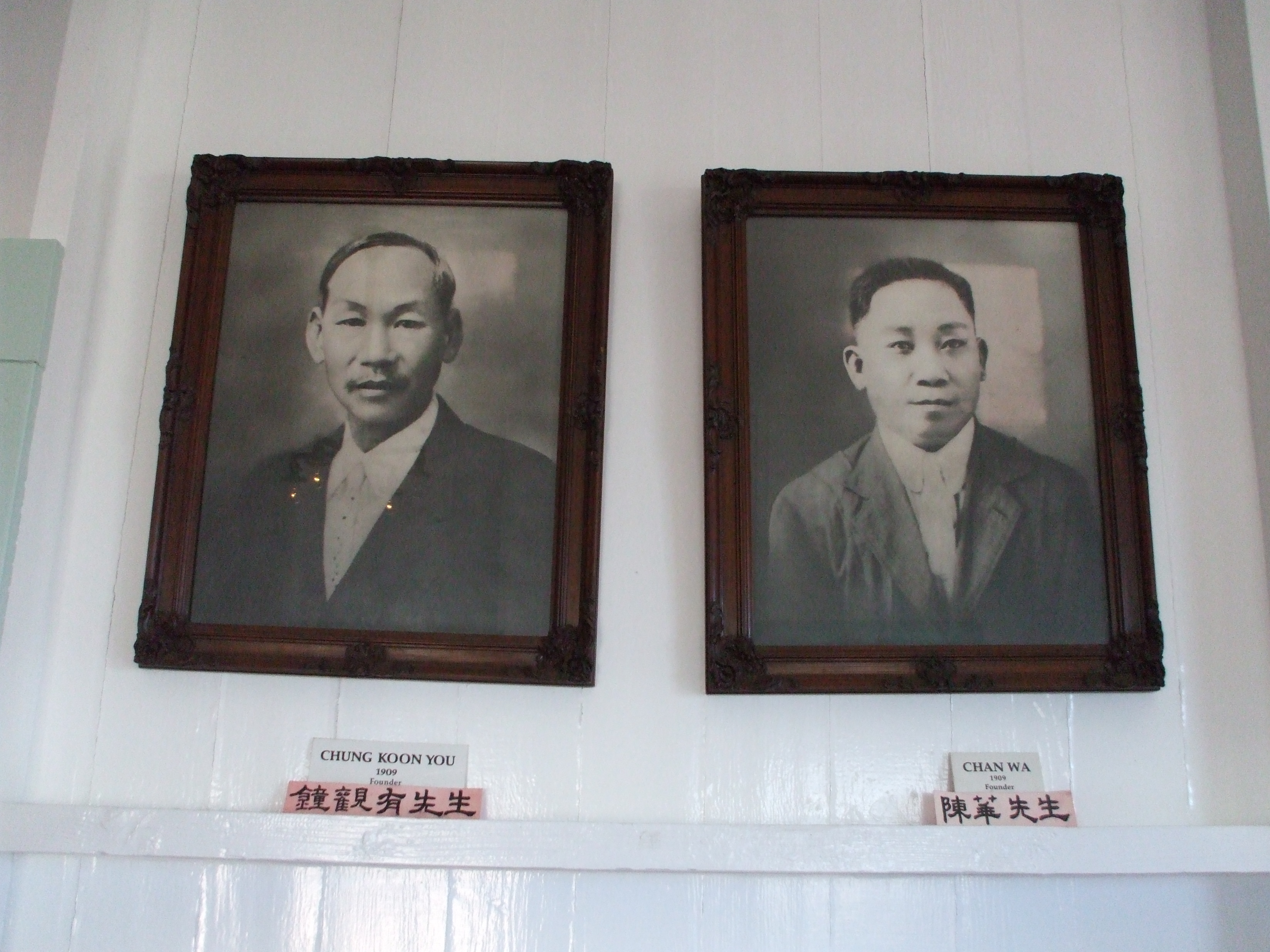
Wo Hing Temple Founders, Chung Koon You and Chan Wa.

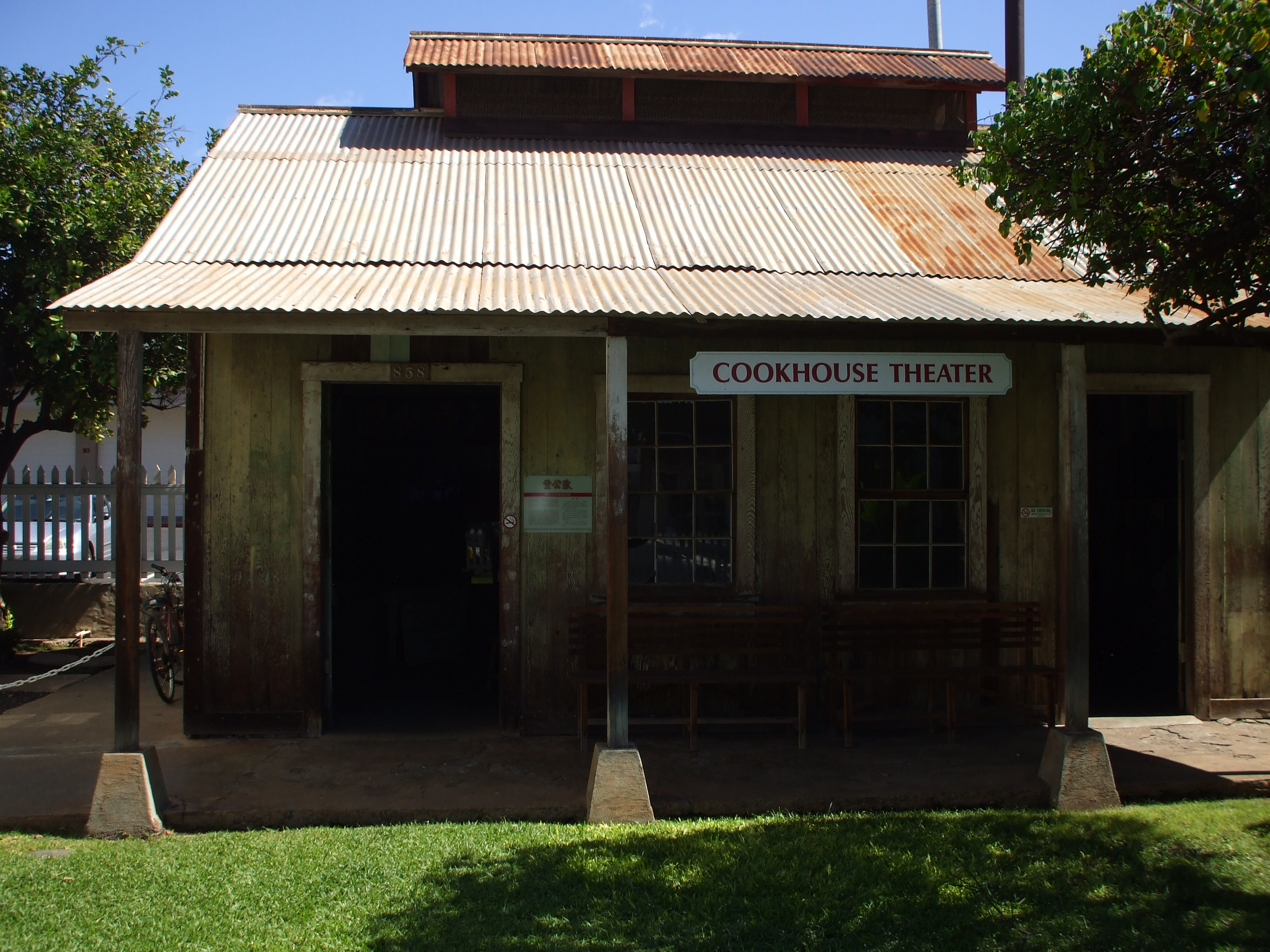
The Cookhouse.

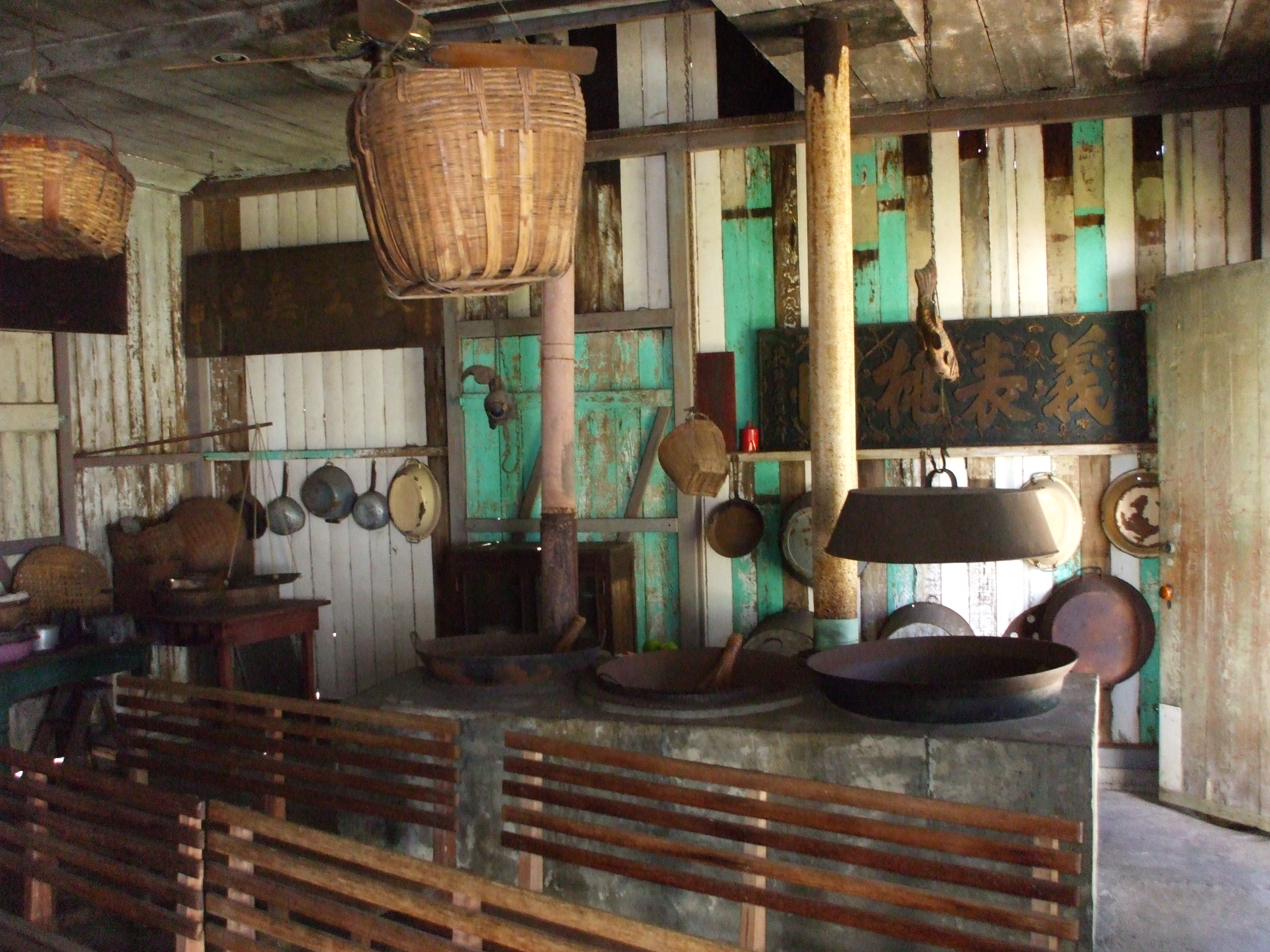
Interior of the Cookhouse.

== See also ==
- Chinese Society Halls on Maui
