= Chee Kung Tong Society Building =

- U.S. National Register of Historic Places
- Hawaiʻi Register of Historic Places
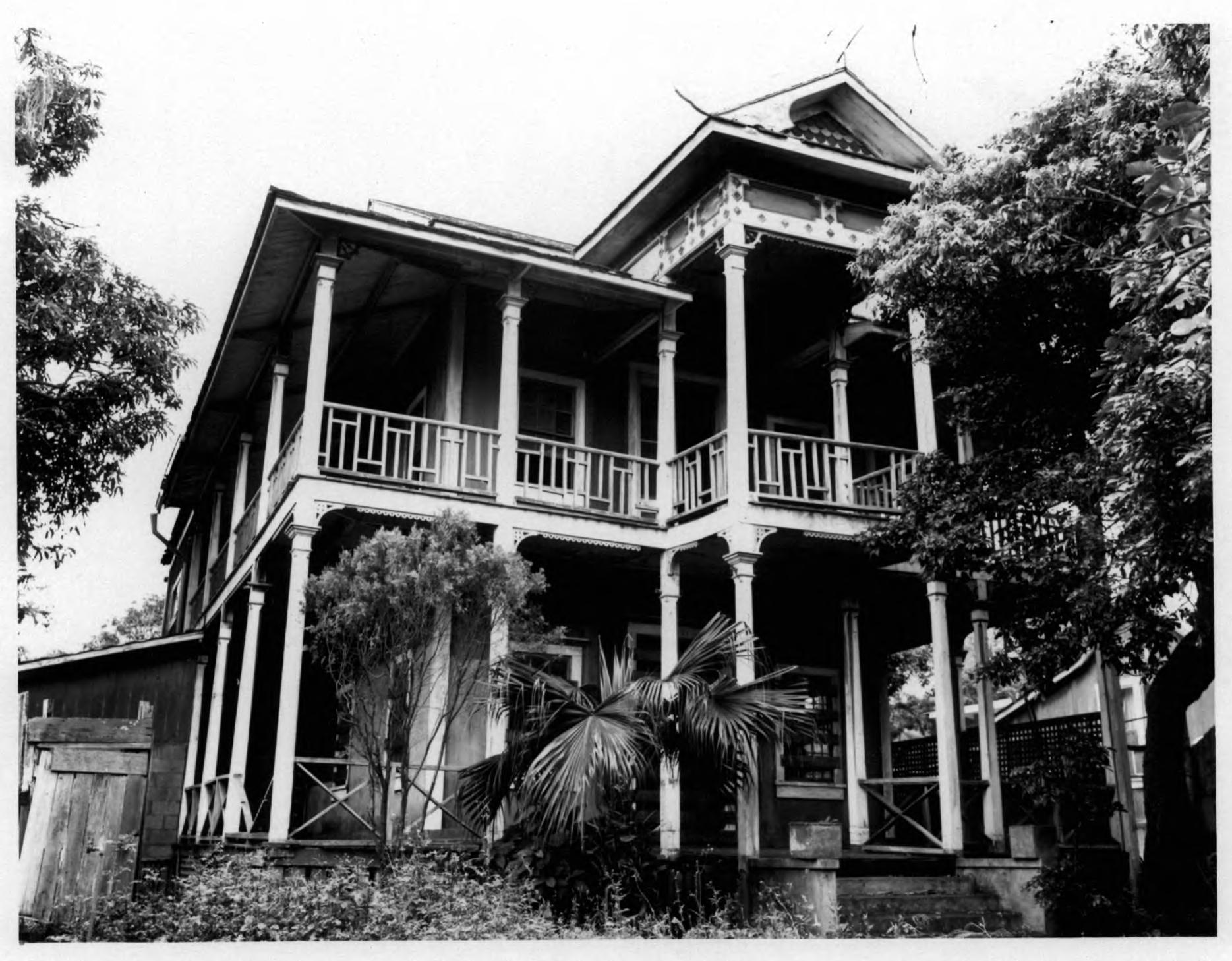
- The society building c.1981

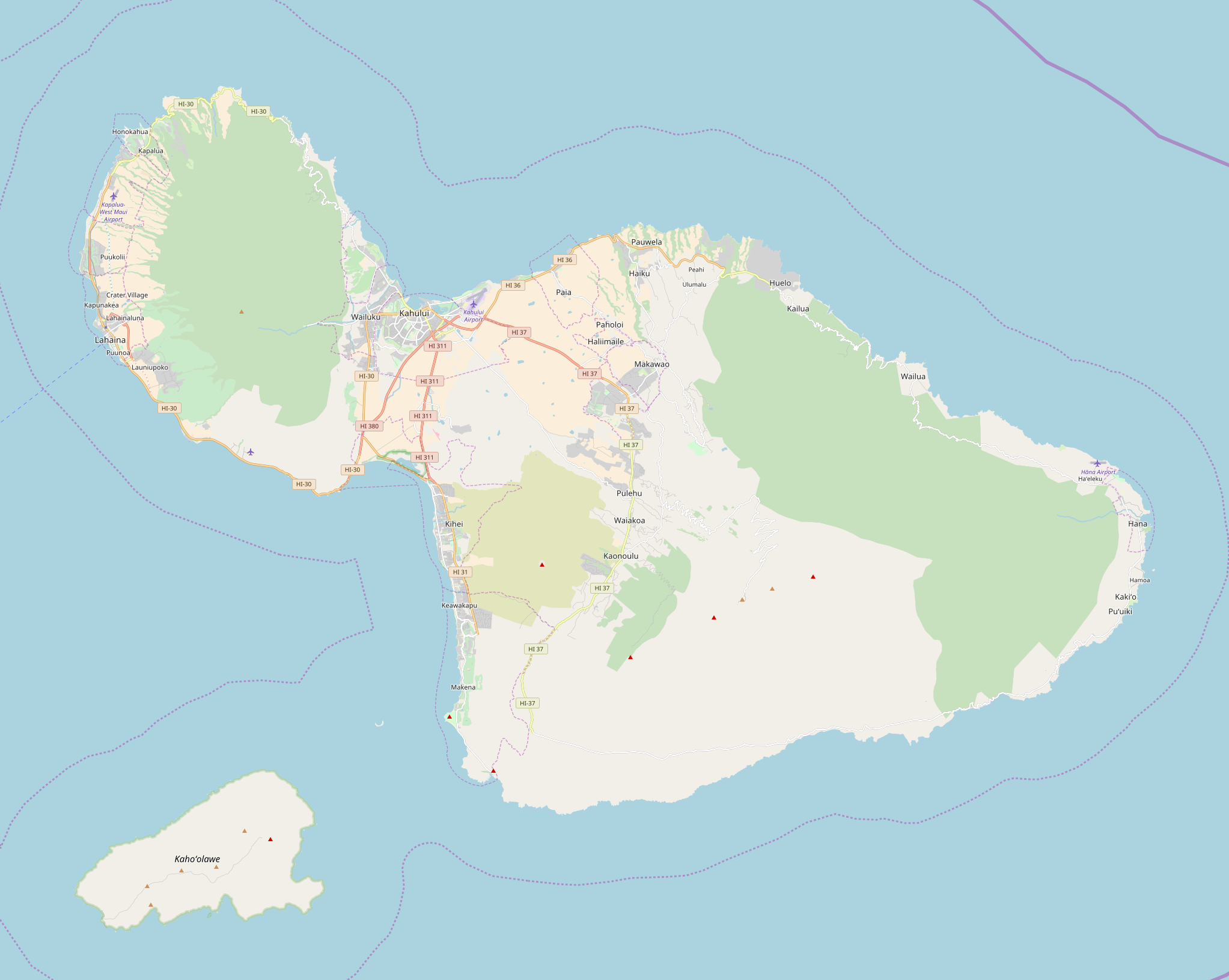
- Location within Maui Location within Hawaii
- Location: 2151 Vineyard Street; Wailuku, Hawaii
- Coordinates: 20°53′18.3″N 156°30′15.8″W
- Area: 4,544 square feet (422.2 m^{2})
- Built: 1904
- MPS: Chinese Tong Houses of Maui Island TR
- NRHP reference No.: 82000171
- HRHP No.: 50-50-10-01615

Significant dates
- Added to NRHP: November 15, 1982
- Designated HRHP: July 30, 1982
- Delisted HRHP: October 29, 1998

The Chee Kung Tong Society Hall was a former Chinese society hall located on 2151 Vineyard Street in Wailuku, Maui. Built to provide services to single immigrant Chinese males, mostly working for the sugarcane plantations, it provided religious and political help, in addition to mutual aid. Converted to a dormitory in the 1920s, it suffered neglect until finally collapsing in 1996. The site now contains remnants of the foundation, assorted cement structures, and a distinct lintel gate and wall facing the street. The site was placed on the Hawaii State Register of Historic Places and the National Register of Historic Places (under the Chinese Tong Houses of Maui Island TR nomination form), but delisted from the State register after its collapse; it is still listed in the NRHP database.

== History ==
It is unclear when the society hall was first built due to conflicting information; County of Maui records indicate that the building was first listed as being built in 1897, though an article from December 1904 by the Maui News lists the building being built and celebrations made upon completion of the society hall on January 14 and 15, 1905.

The hall provided a place for Chinese immigrants to visit, socialize (such as playing pai gow), and provide aid.

Sometime in 1928, it was noted that the society hall was converted for use as a dormitory by single men, and this use was supposedly practiced up until the 1960s. After the last occupant died, the property was neglected.

== Collapse ==
In September 1988, part of a wall of the building collapsed, smashing adjacent trees, plants, and two clothesline poles in a neighboring property.

On April 17, 1996, the derelict wood building collapsed due to damage caused by wood rot, termites, and gravity. Before the collapse, Society Elders had planned to meet to discuss the fate of the building. Certain elements of the building were to have been recovered, and possibly reused in the reconstruction of the building.

== Design ==
The property is 4,544 square feet (422.2 m^{2}) according to Maui County tax records via the Department of Finance's Real Property Division and the NRHP nomination form.

The entrance gate comprises two concrete posts and a lintel with Chinese characters on it. Formerly delineated in red, the front facing the street contains incused Chinese characters spelling out Chee Kung Fui Kon (if pronounced in the Hakka dialect; Chinese: 致公會館), and the back containing the phrase (translated as) Everyone is equal.

The main building was a rectangular, two-story structure approximately 55 feet (17 m) by 34 feet (10 m), with covered verandas on both floors. Architectural elements included shingled intersecting gabled roofs with gabled ends and fish-scaled shingles painted in various colors. Assorted other details included a scalloped archway, chamfered posts, decorative wheel and quatrefoil brackets, and an entrance gable with a carved bridgeboard. Diamonds and rectangles were also incorporated into the structure via ornamental lintels and balustrades.

A trapezoid cinder block structure approximately 19 feet (5.8 m) by 32 feet (9.8 m) stood next to the building to the east.

== Historic listings ==
The site was placed on the Hawaii State Register of Historic Places on July 30, 1982 and the National Register of Historic Places on November 15, 1982, but delisted in August 1998 from the State register; it is still listed in the NRHP database.

== Current condition ==
Today, the site consists of only a few cement structures and several trees obscuring the front of the property. The gate and adjoining walls, stairs, sidewalks, foundation pillars, and the cinderblock addition lie in decrepit condition. The phrase Everyone is equal is barely discernible behind the lintel on the gate.

As of 2010, a property listing sale noted additional details, including the lack of a water meter and possible building restrictions due to it being under the jurisdiction of a redevelopment authority.

== Gallery ==
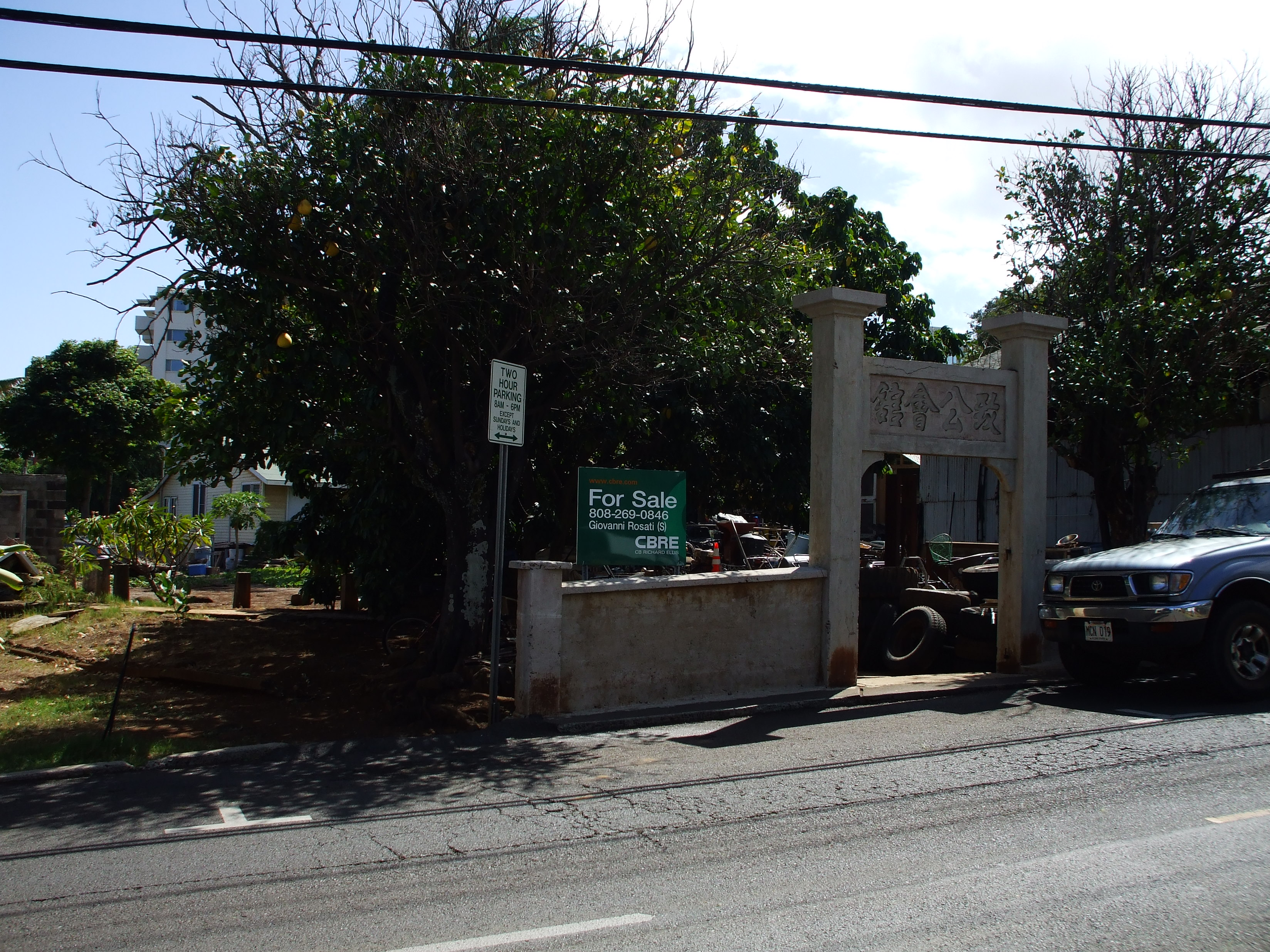
The lot in October 2007.

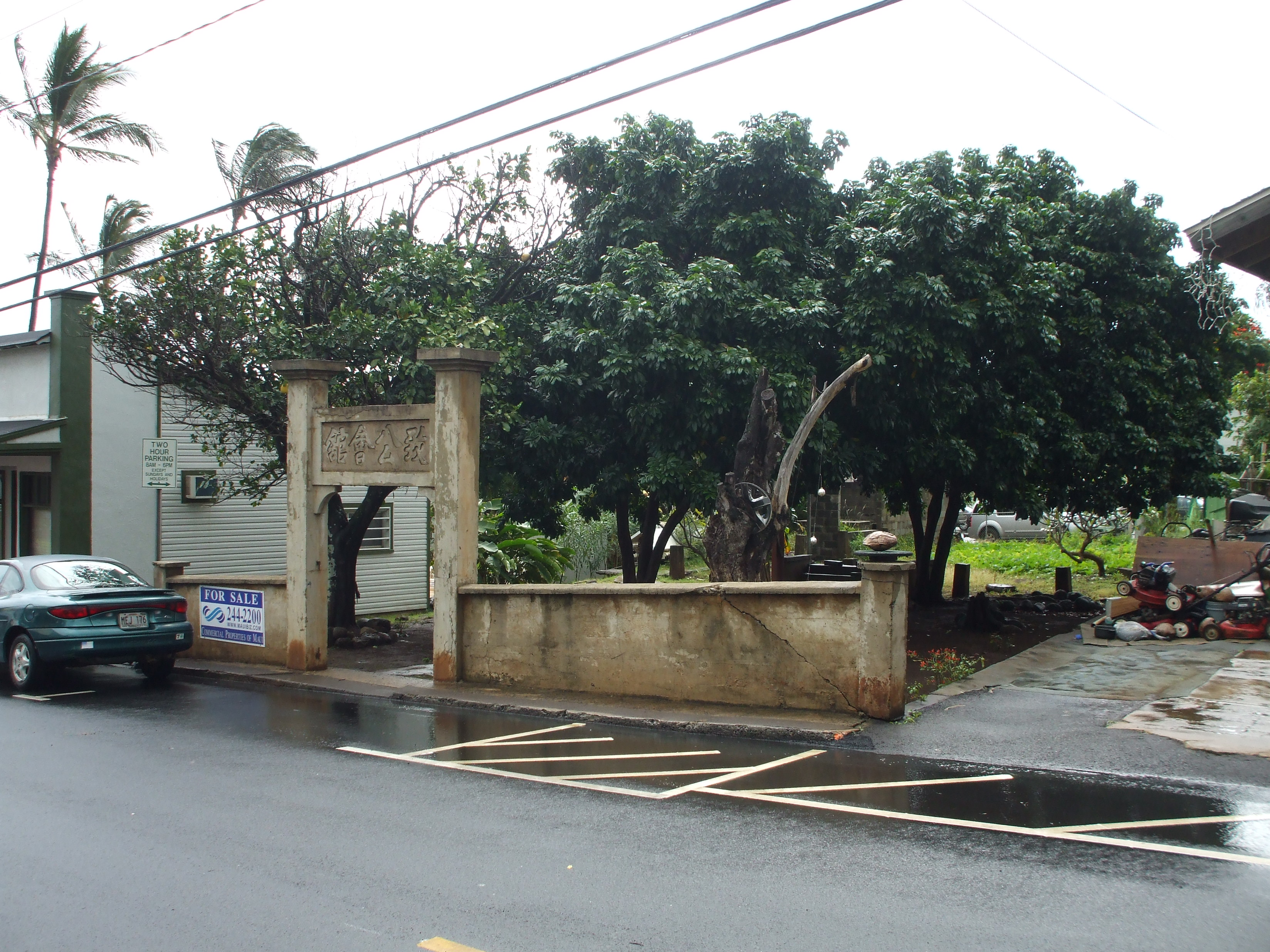
The lot in March 2010

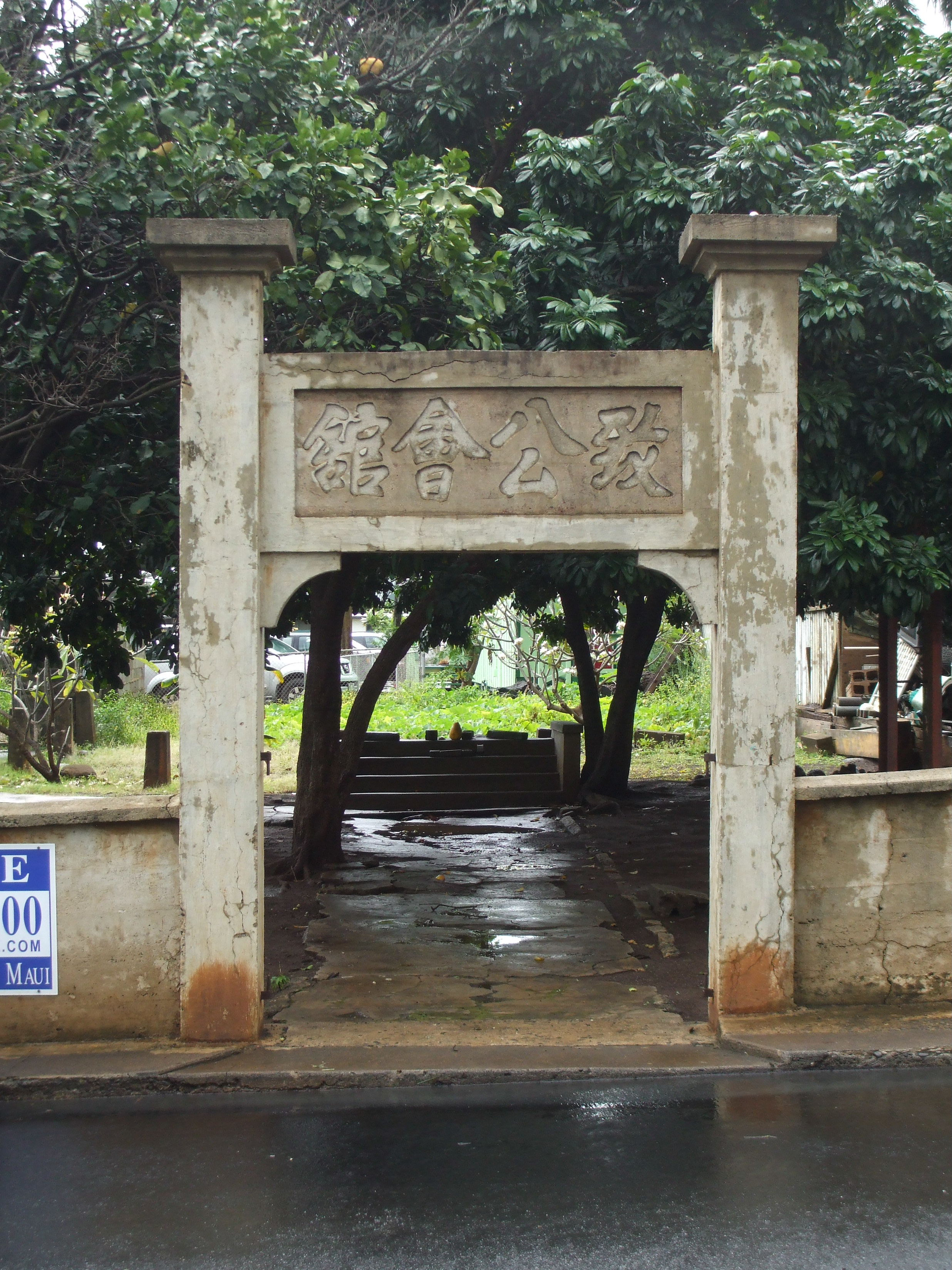
Gate to the property, reading 致公會館.

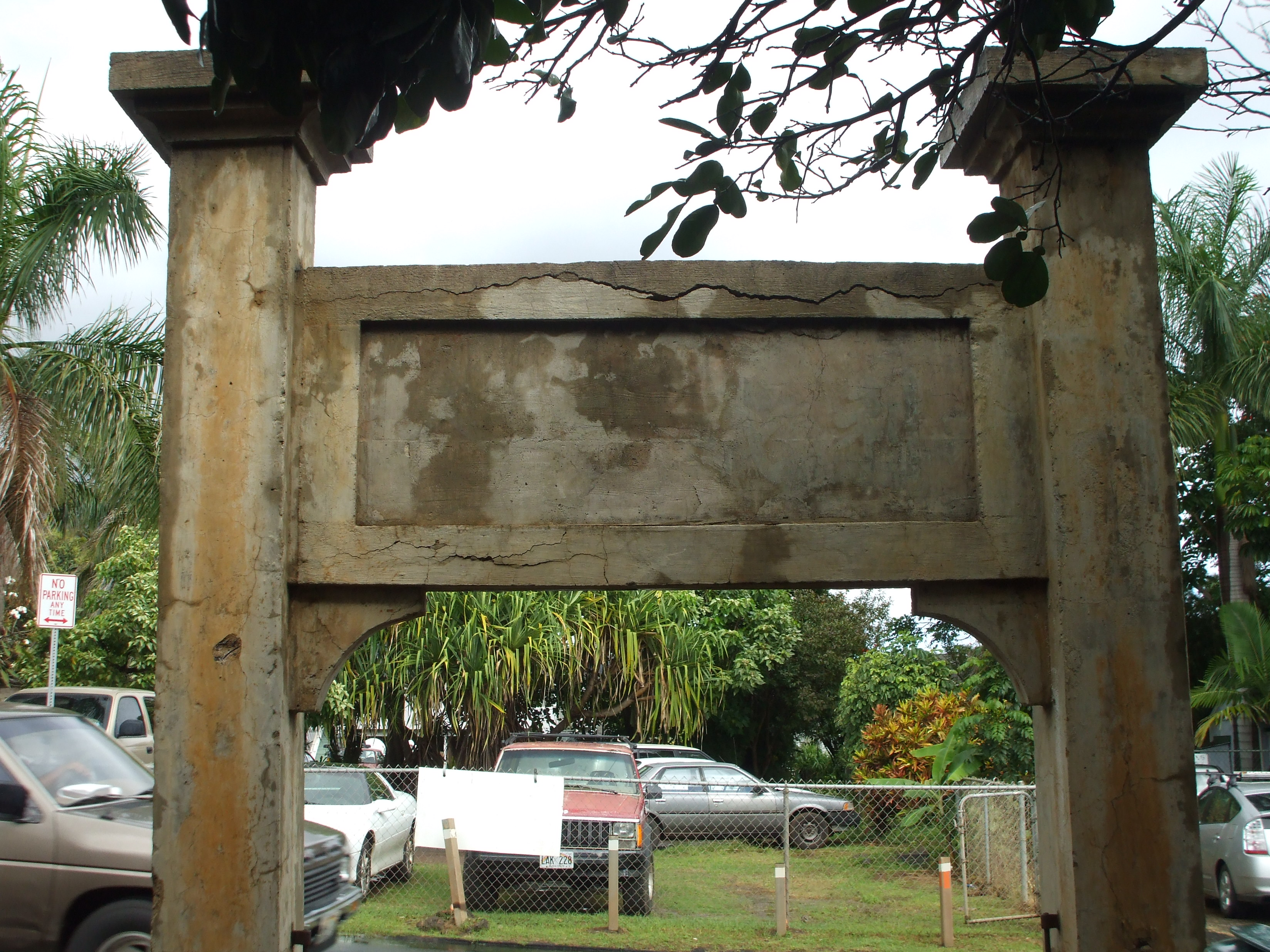
Back of the gate.

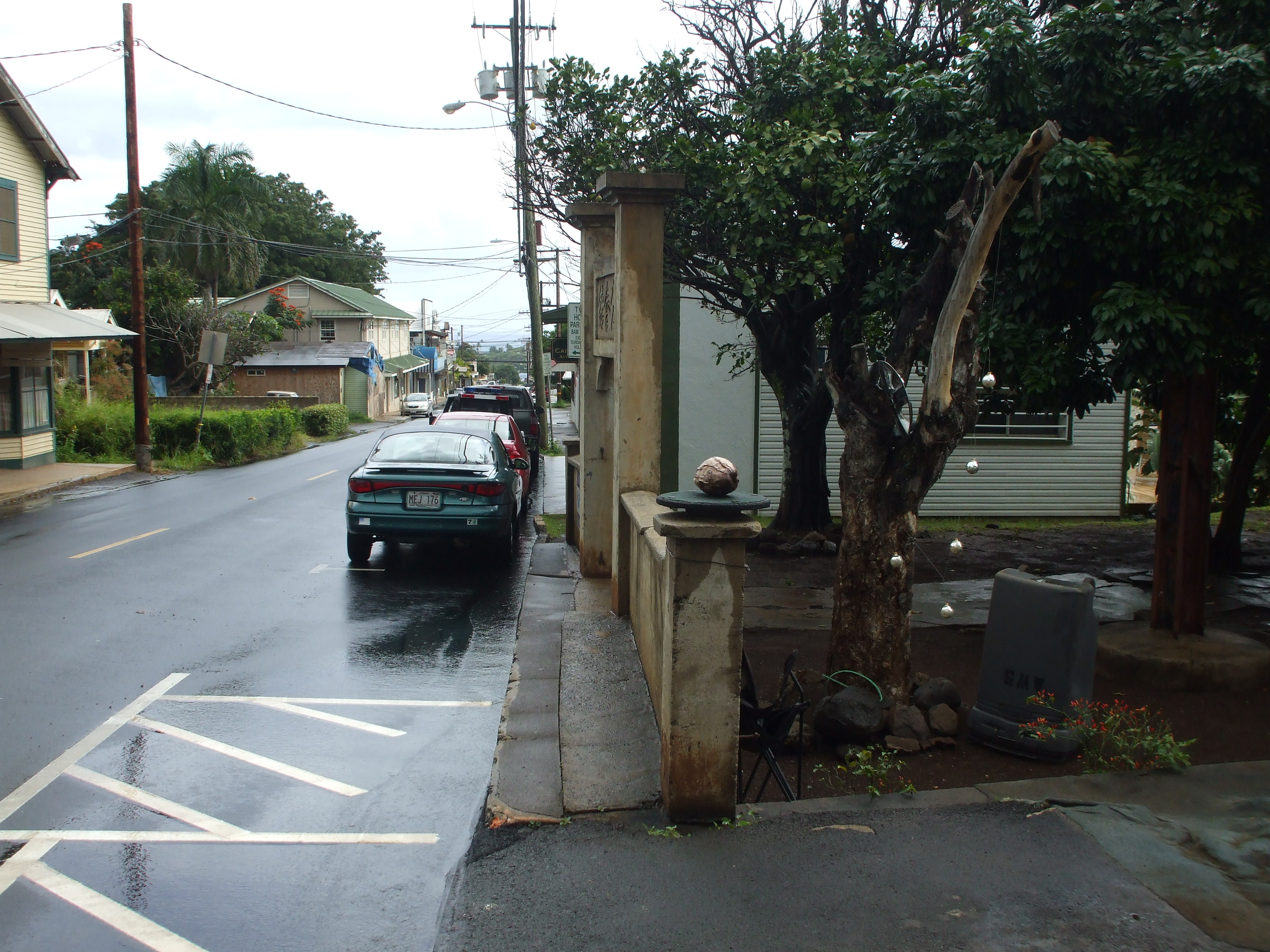
Side view of the gate and wall.

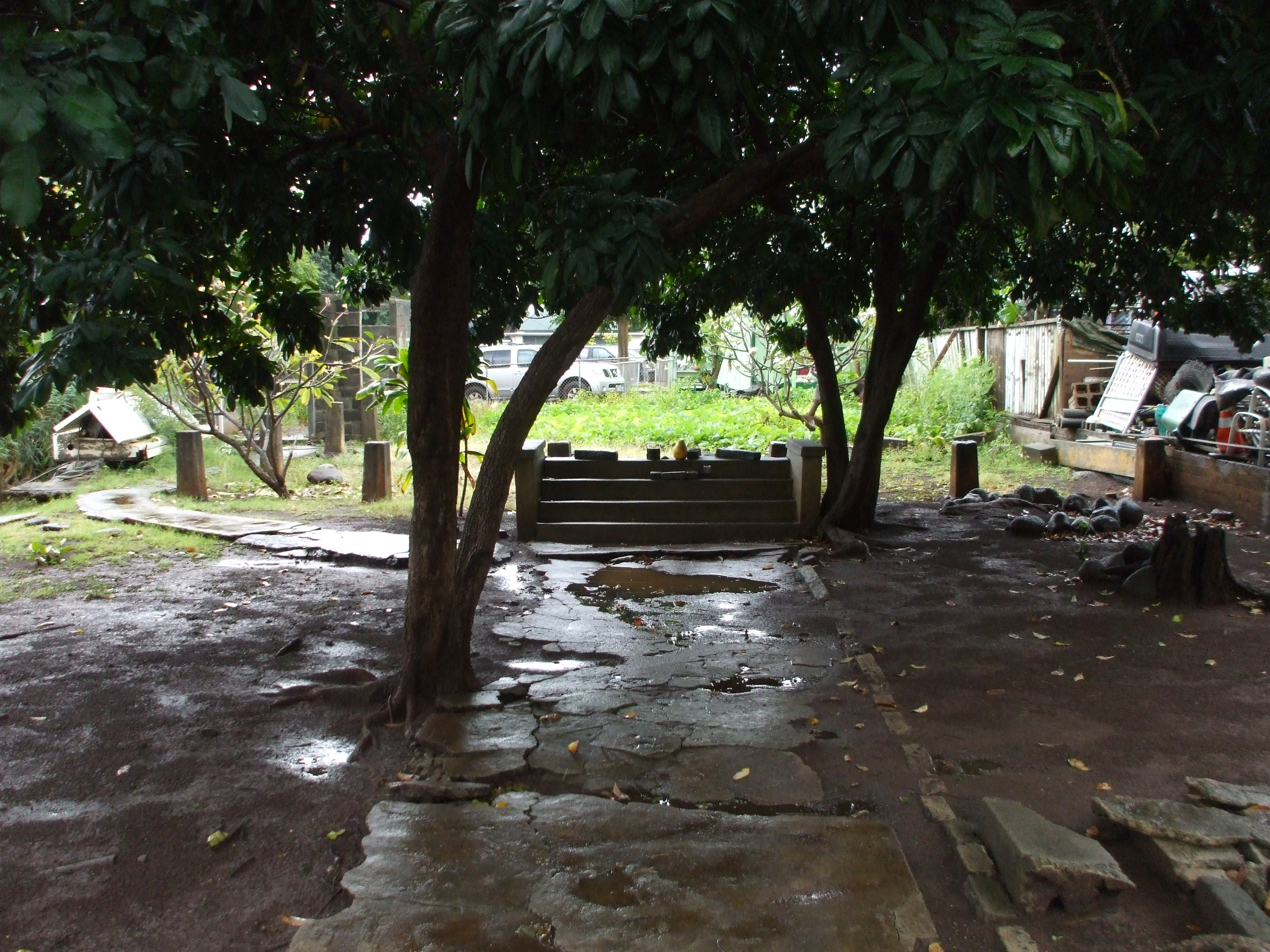
Looking from the gate onto the property.

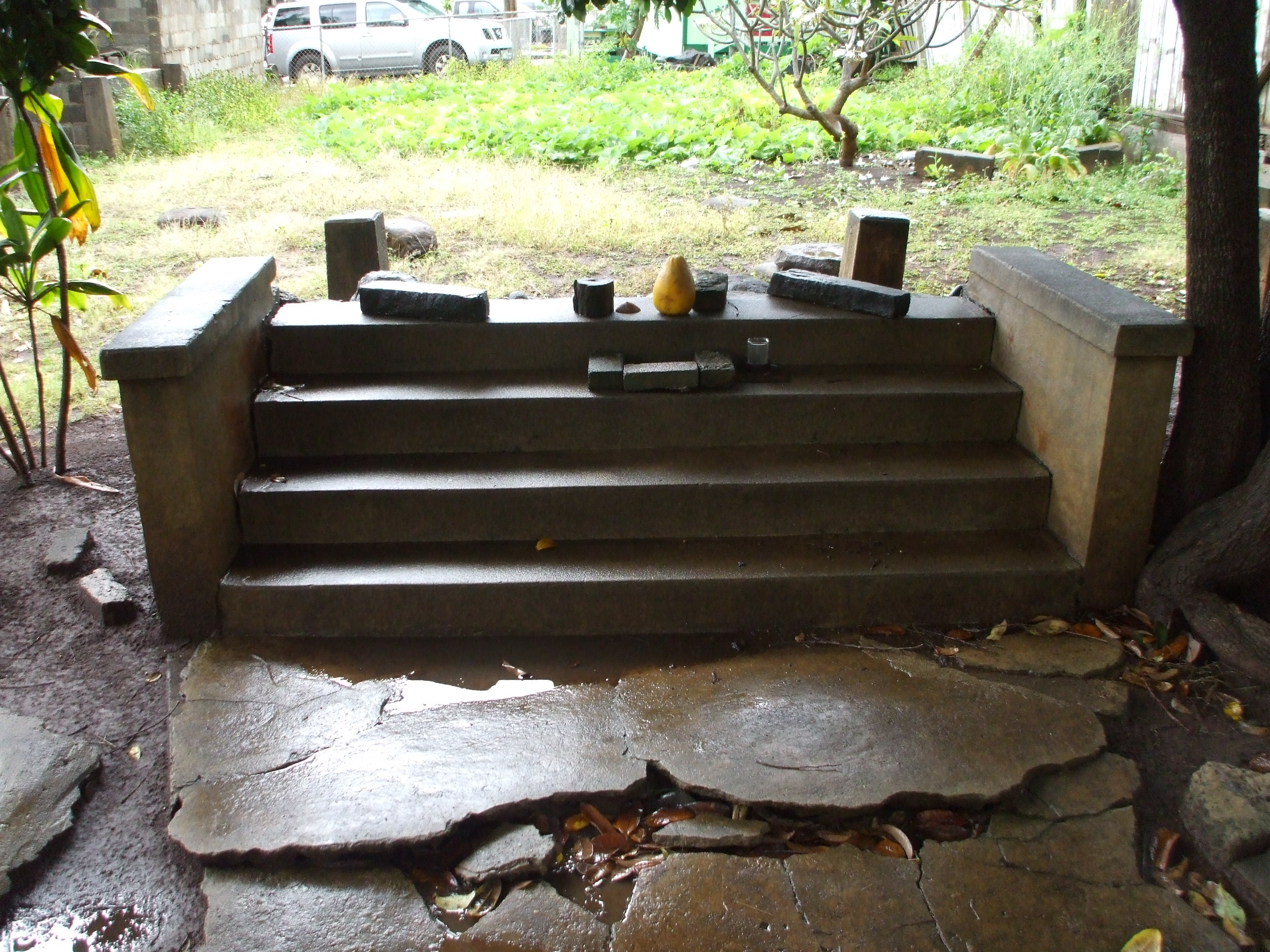
The steps that formerly led into the Hall.

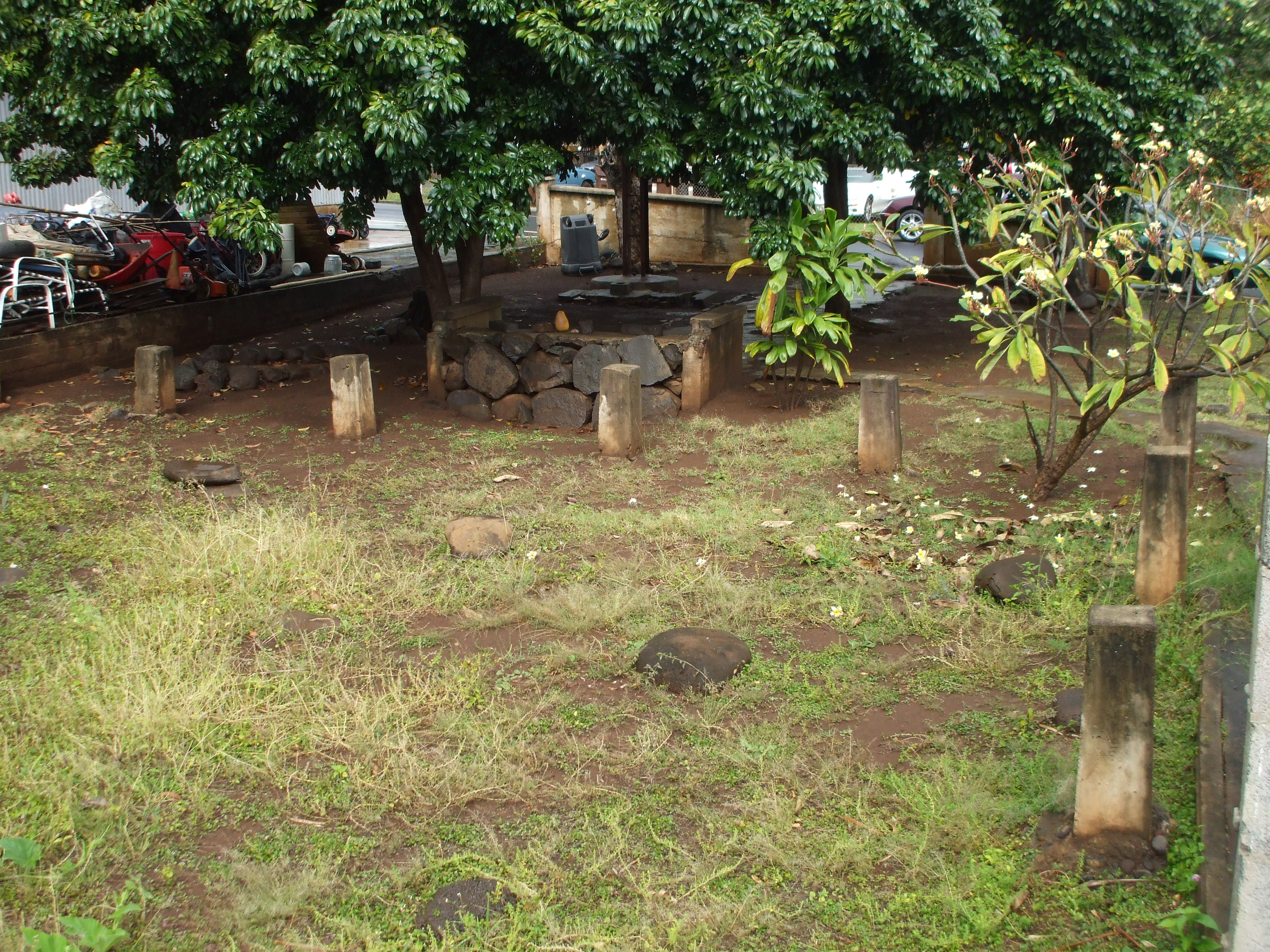
Part of the foundation stones that held up the building.

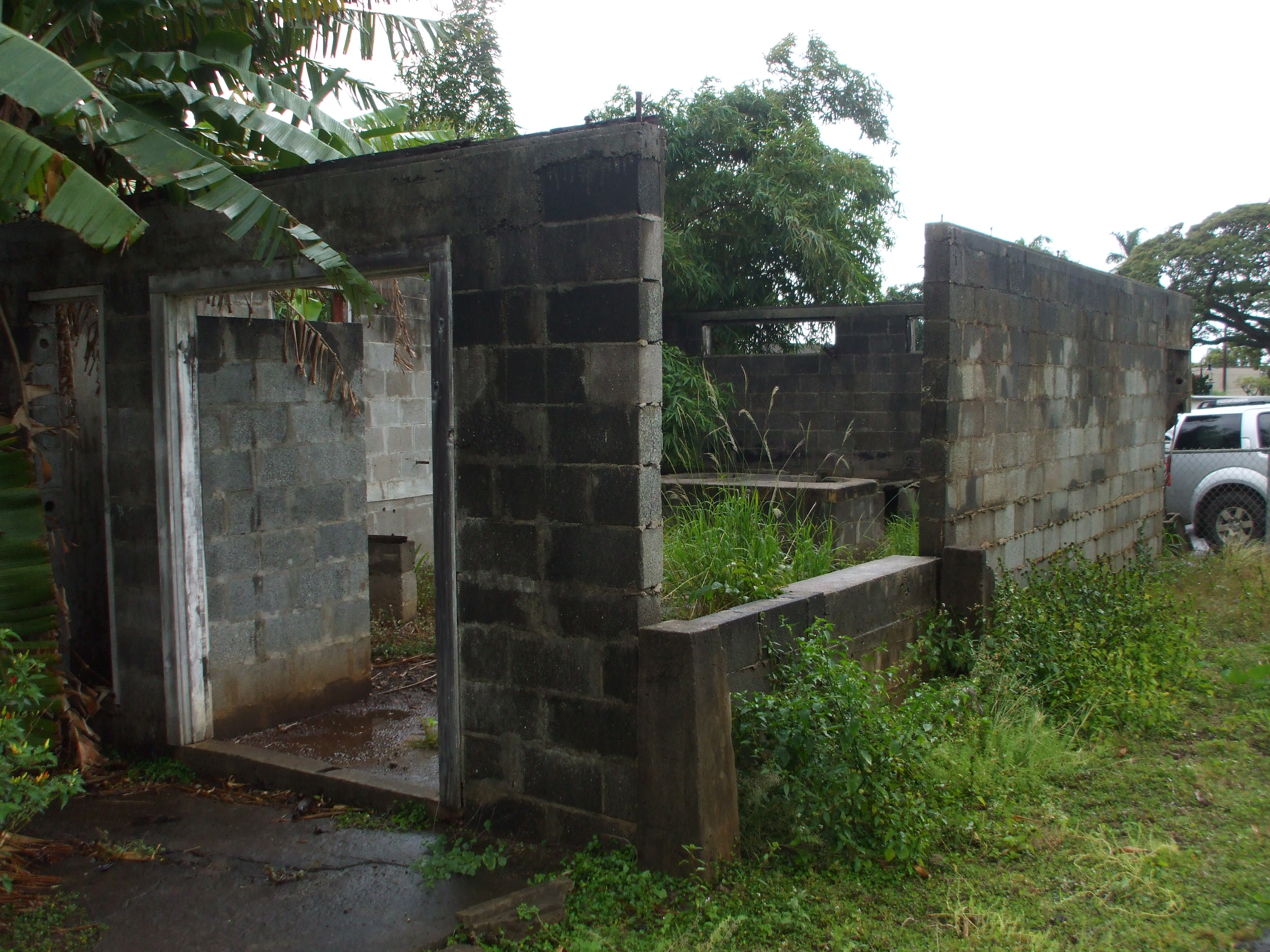
The cinderblock building that is left on the site.

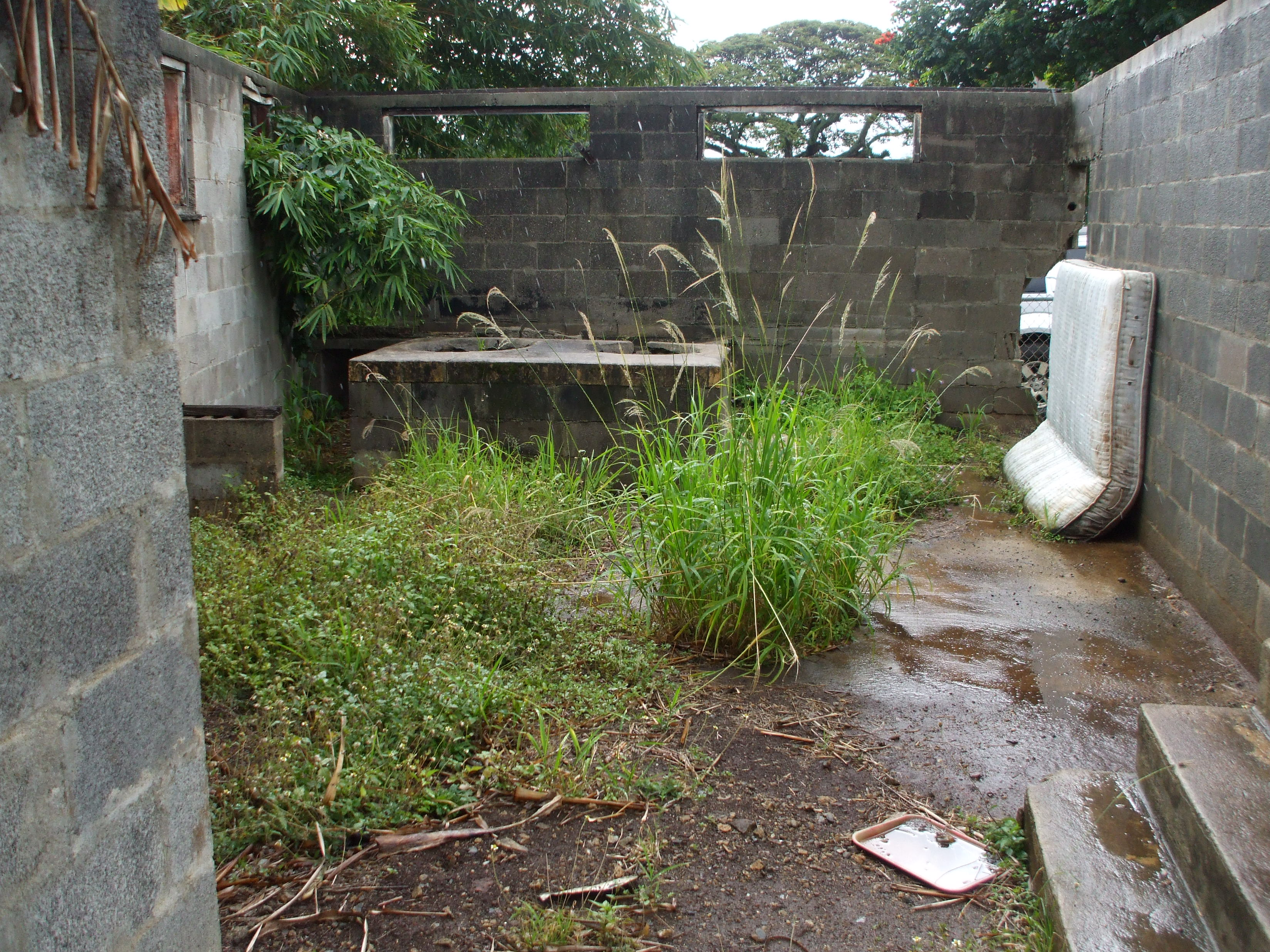
Inside of the cinderblock building.

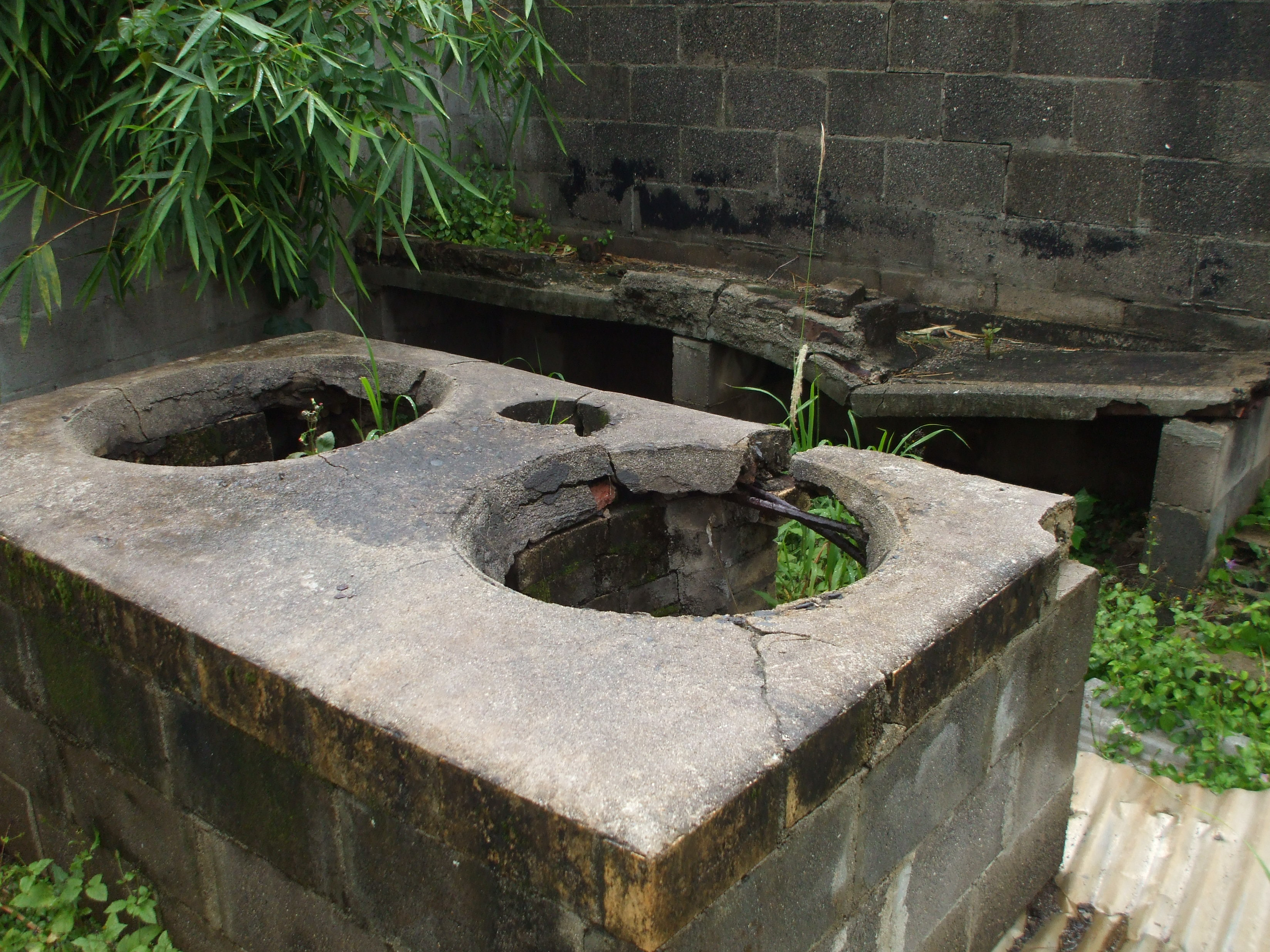
Closeup of the fireplace area.

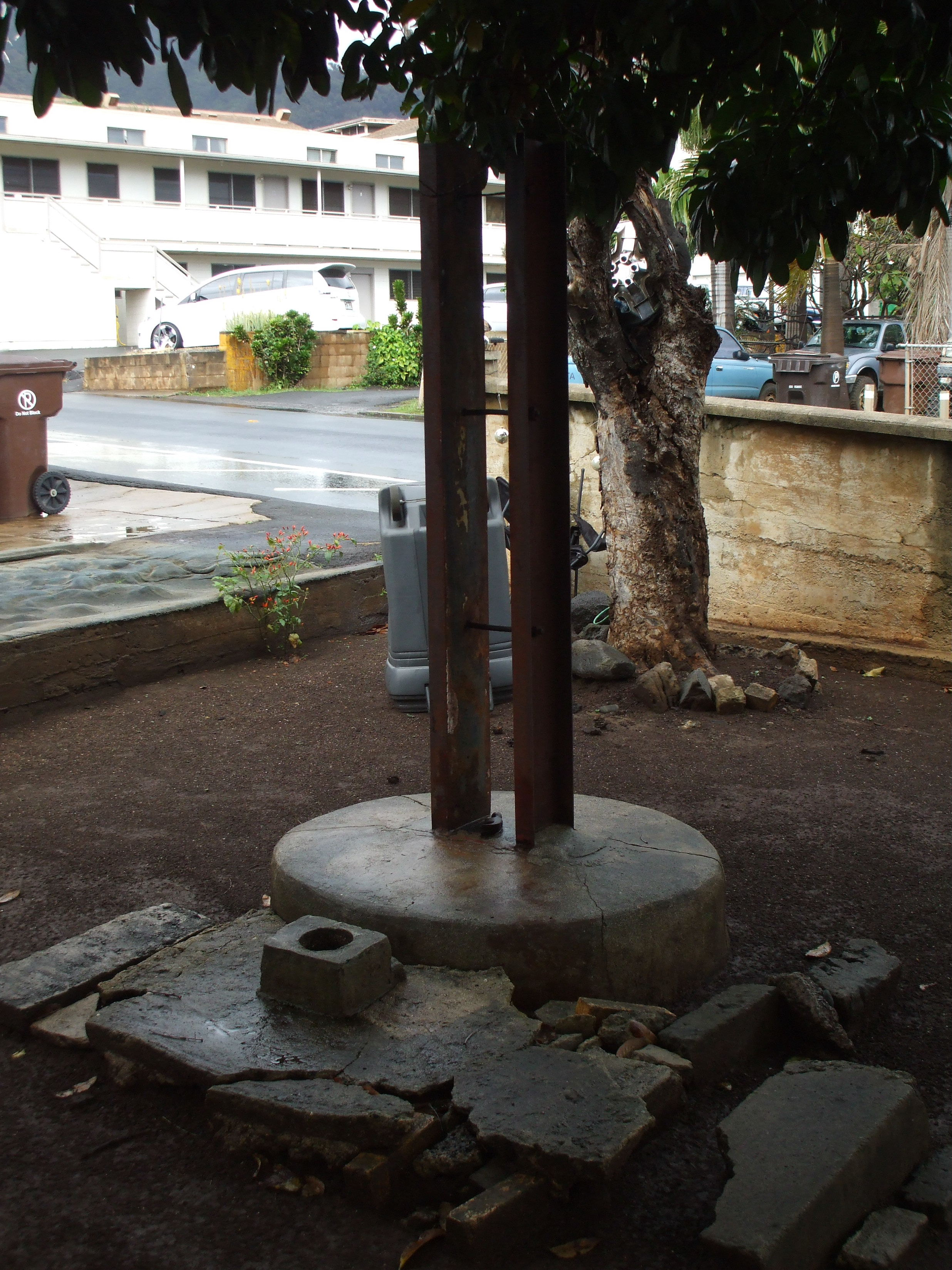
Unknown steel beam on the property.
