= Chee Kung Tong =

Chinese–American secret society

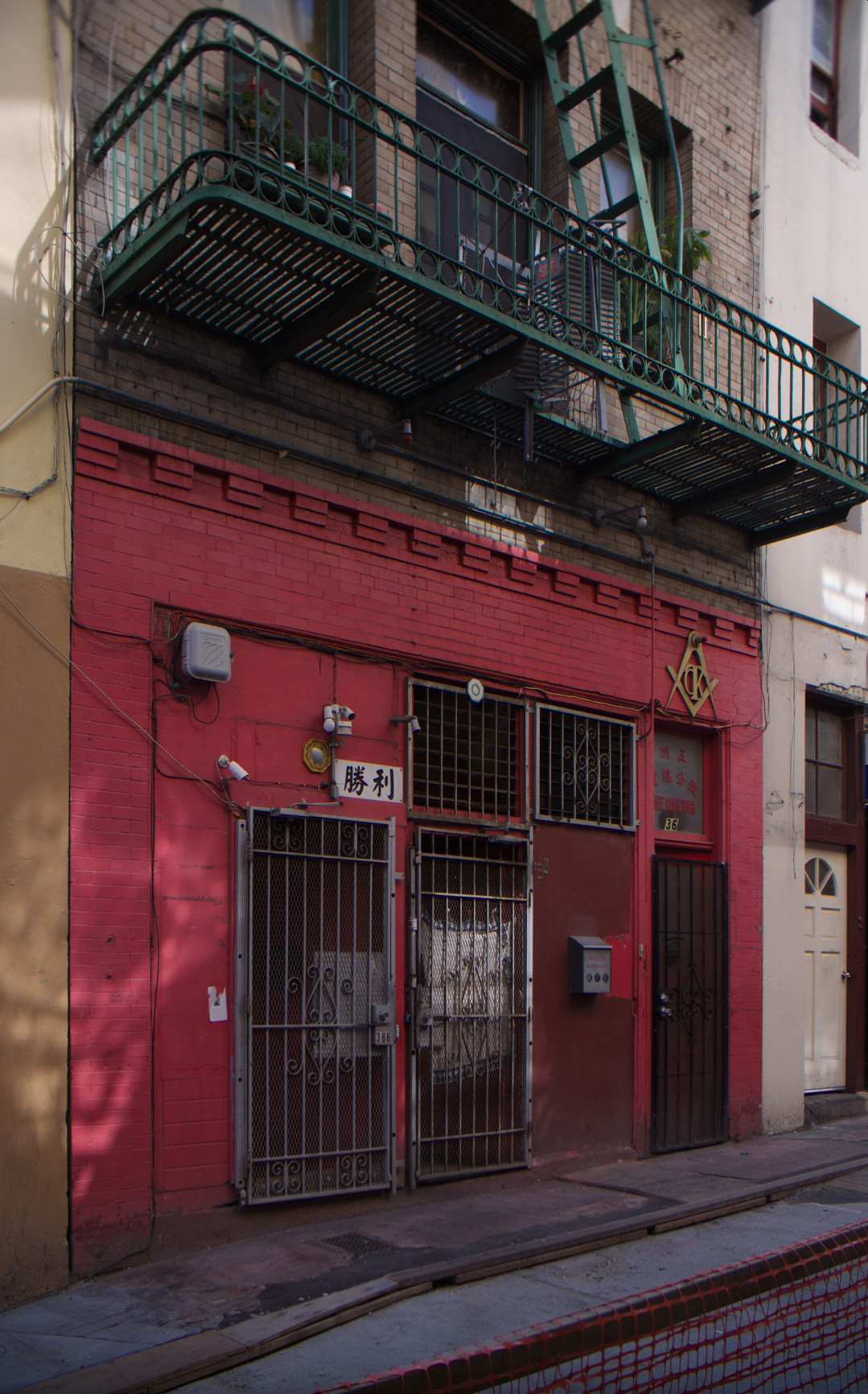
Chee Kung Tong building at 36–38 Spoffard Alley in Chinatown, San Francisco, California

The Chee Kung Tong (Chinese: 致公堂; Jyutping: zi3 gung1 tong4), or Gee Kung Tong, was a Chinese secret society established in 1880 and holds an active presence still. In earlier years, the society has also been recognized as the "Chinese Freemasons" and has been identified under various names such as Hongmen (Chinese: 洪門), Hongshuntang (Chinese: 洪順堂), and Yixingtang (Chinese: 義興堂). The fraternity founded its headquarters in San Francisco in the United States. Additionally, there came to be a branch located in Victoria on Canada's Vancouver Island.

== History ==
The Chee Kung Tong likely formed in the 18th century in Fujian, China. Through migration, the organization spread to other Chinese provinces and eventually to the United States and Canada. Early members were taught legends and rituals including secret handshakes that were used to identify one another. The majority of early members were made up of lower-class Chinese and migrants. Membership was open regardless of region, surname, or clan.

Members of the Chee Kung Tong were likely some of the first Chinese immigrants who travelled to Canada from California during the Fraser Canyon Gold Rush in 1858. The organization officially established itself in Canada in 1863, and by the early 20th century there were more than forty Chee Kung Tong lodges in British Columbia. At this time, the membership in Canada was estimated to 60% of the overall Chinese population in the country. The Vancouver chapter of the Chee Kung Tong ran a newspaper from 1907-1992 called the Tai Hon Kong Bo (Chinese Times).

The Chee Kung Tong was established as an all-male fraternity with the purpose of promoting Chinese values, customs, and the ideals of democracy, within a tight-knit network of brotherhood that has ties dating back over three hundred years prior in China. The society is considered the oldest Chinese-rooted organization established in the United States.

The Chee Kung Tong are most recognized for their political support of Sun Yat-sen, who is considered the founding father of the Republic of China. Sun became a member of the Chee Kung Tong as he viewed the organization as a network that could help him overthrow the Qing Dynasty, and he promised that he would expand the group and turn it into an revolutionary party. Sun Yat-Sen began a campaign to overthrow the Manchu rulers of the Qing Dynasty. In 1904, a meeting took place between The Chee Kung Tong and Sun Yat-Sen in Hawaii. The purpose of the meeting was to rally nationalist support for a future revolution that would take place in 1911. The society also assisted in Sun Yat-Sen's campaign throughout the United States. Sun Yat-sen also helped write the Chee Kung Tong's constitution in 1904. The building at 36–38 Spoffard Alley in San Francisco, California had served as the temporary home for Sun Yat-sen while he lived in exile.

The Chee Kung Tong funded Sun Yat-Sen's revolutionary aims through legal and illegal means, such as brothels and opium sales, in addition to mortgaging their Victoria lodge. Since any support for overthrowing the Qing Dynasty was punishable by death, the majority of the Chee Kung Tong's members were located outside of China.

After the overthrow of the Qing Dynasty in 1911, the Chee Kung Tong lost political influence in China. Sun reneged on his promise to assist the organization, and began supporting the Kuomintang (KMT) instead. The Chee Kung Tong criticized Sun, who in turn criticized the Chee Kung Tong and labeled them as being incompatible with republican China. Sun's failure to recognize the efforts of the Chee Kung Tong, along with his refusal to repay funds raised by the organization, earned him the nickname "Sun, the Big Liar". In 1918, the Chee Kung Tong formed the Dart Coon Club in Vancouver as an internal governing body within the group who were also responsible for protecting the organization's properties and funds from Sun and KMT sympathizers. In 13 January 1923, Chee Kung Tong issued a notice expelling Sun Yat-sen. The Chee Kung Tong claimed that the expulsion was due to "Sun Yat-sen's attempt to form a Sino-Russian alliance", which argued so as "an obstacle to Chinese unity". The society accused Sun of struggling for power rather than acting for a legitimate public cause. Tensions between supporters of the KMT and Chee Kung Tong were high in Vancouver throughout the 1920s and 1930s, but subsided during the Second Sino-Japanese War.

The Chee Kung Tong changed its name to the Chinese Freemasons in an effort to distance themselves from Sun. Its unclear why this name was chosen, as the organization does not have any affiliation with the Freemasons.

In 1964, the Canadian government began a process of forgiving so-called "paper relatives" who entered Canada falsely claiming to be relatives of someone already living in the country. Organizations like the Chinese Freemasons gave records of membership and donations to the government which were enough documentation to provide roughly 12,000 Chinese "paper relatives" residency.

== Buildings ==
=== Canada ===
In Vancouver, the Chinese Freemasons Building was constructed in 1907 at 5 West Pender. The building was acquired to serve as a dormitory and meeting place of the Chee Kung Tong. In 1913, the Bank of Vancouver moved in as a tenant on the ground floor. Chinese-Canadian photographer Yucho Chow's studio was located in the building's upper floor. The building sustained heavy damage in the 1907 Vancouver anti-Asian riots.

== Conflicts ==
In San Francisco, the Chee Kong tong, like many of the tongs in that time period, found themselves at odds with other Chinese societies. "Two of the more notorious rivals to the Chee Kong tong were the Gee Sin Seer and the Bo Sin Seer... As far as the press could determine, the Bo Sin Seer was controlled by men who kept legitimate grocery stores as well as illicit fan-tan and bawdy houses, while the Gee Sin Seer was under the rule of entrepreneur Little Pete."

== See also ==
- Chee Kung Tong Society Building in Maui; NRHP-listed
- China Zhi Gong Party – mainland Chinese political party which grew out of the society
- For Public Good Party – minor political party in Taiwan
