= Chinese Society Halls on Maui =

- Chinese Tong Houses of Maui Island TR
- U.S. National Register of Historic Places
- Hawaiʻi Register of Historic Places
- Location: Maui, Hawaii
- Built: various
- Architect: various
- Architectural style: not listed/various
- NRHP reference No.: 82000173, under the Chinese Tong Houses of Maui Island TR
- HRHP No.: 50-50-10-01615

Significant dates
- Added to NRHP: November 15, 1982
- Designated HRHP: June 30, 1982

At their peak, there were six Chinese Society Halls on Maui. Operated by the Gee Kung Tong Society, these halls were created to provide services to immigrant Chinese workers, mostly working for the sugarcane plantations. All provided religious and political help, in addition to mutual aid. Only the Ket Hing Society Hall in Kula has survived. It were placed on the Hawaii State Register of Historic Places on July 30, 1982, and placed on the National Register of Historic Places on November 15, 1982. The Chee Kung Tong Society Hall & Wo Hing Society Hall was placed onto both State and Federal registers, but both suffered different fates; the Chee Kung Hall collapsing in 1996 & the Wo Hing Hall destroyed in the 2023 Hawaii wildfires.

== Purpose ==
In 1852, many Chinese were brought to work on Hawaii's sugar plantations, mainly single men. When their contracts expired, some stayed behind and took up other trades. Due to the influx and distance from mainland China, Chinese Tong societies sprouted up to provide Chinese religious and political help, in addition to mutual aid, friendship, and funerary benefits upon death.

Six clubhouses or "Halls" were built. Two survive to this day, while the others have disappeared.

== Chee Kung Tong ==
The Chee Kung Tong Society Hall (Chinese: 致公會館) was a former society hall located on 2151 Vineyard Street in Wailuku. County records indicate that the building was first listed as being built in 1897, thought other sources differ on the matter. It collapsed sometime on April 19, 1996. Today, the vacant lot sits derelict, with only a cement foundation and gate marking the site.

The site was placed on the Hawaii State Register of Historic Places on July 30, 1982 and the National Register of Historic Places on November 15, 1982, but delisted in August 1998 from the State register; it is still listed in the NRHP database.

== Ket Hing Society Building ==
- Ket Hing Society Building
- U.S. National Register of Historic Places
- Hawaiʻi Register of Historic Places
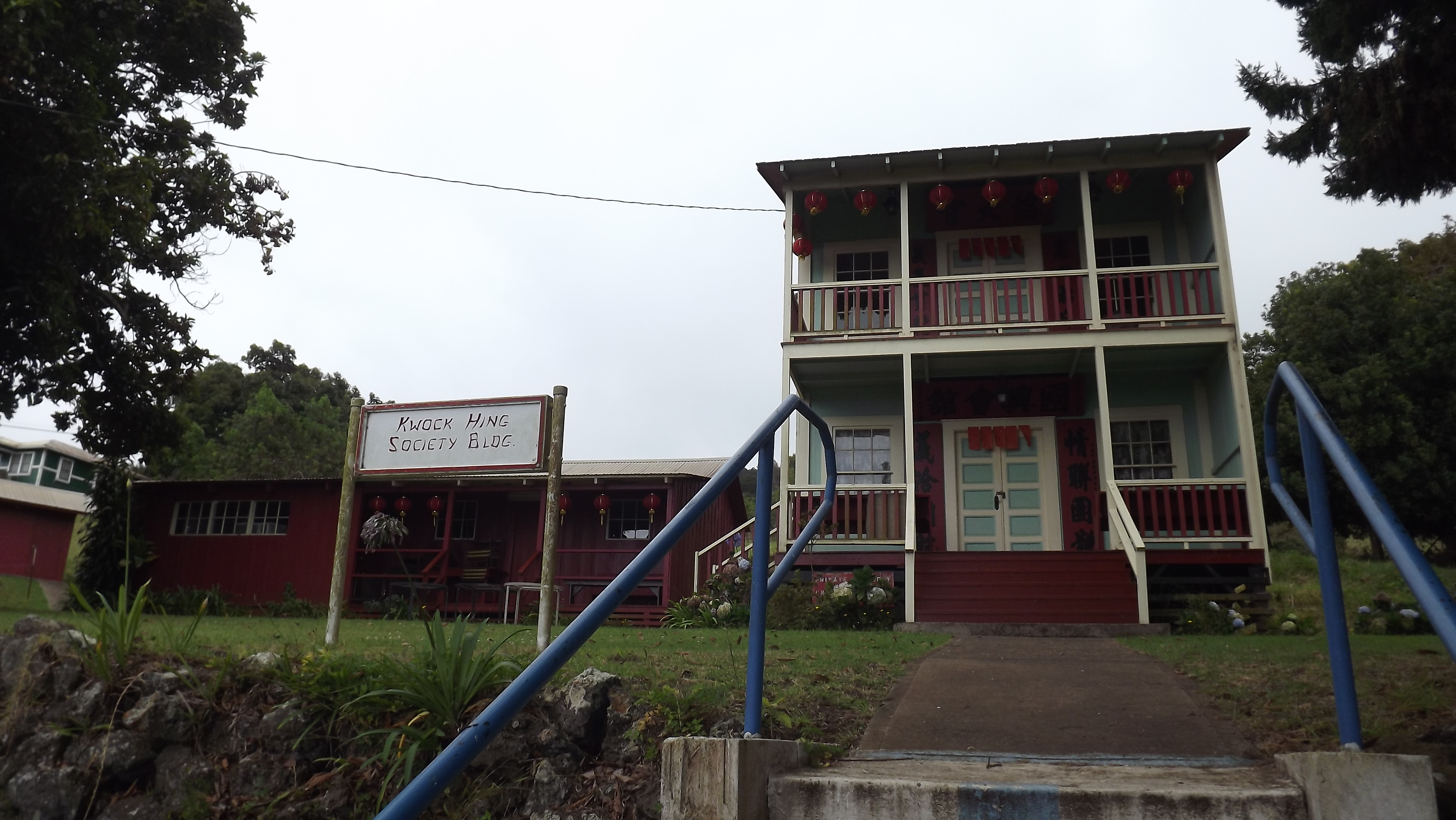
- Main Hall and auxiliary building.

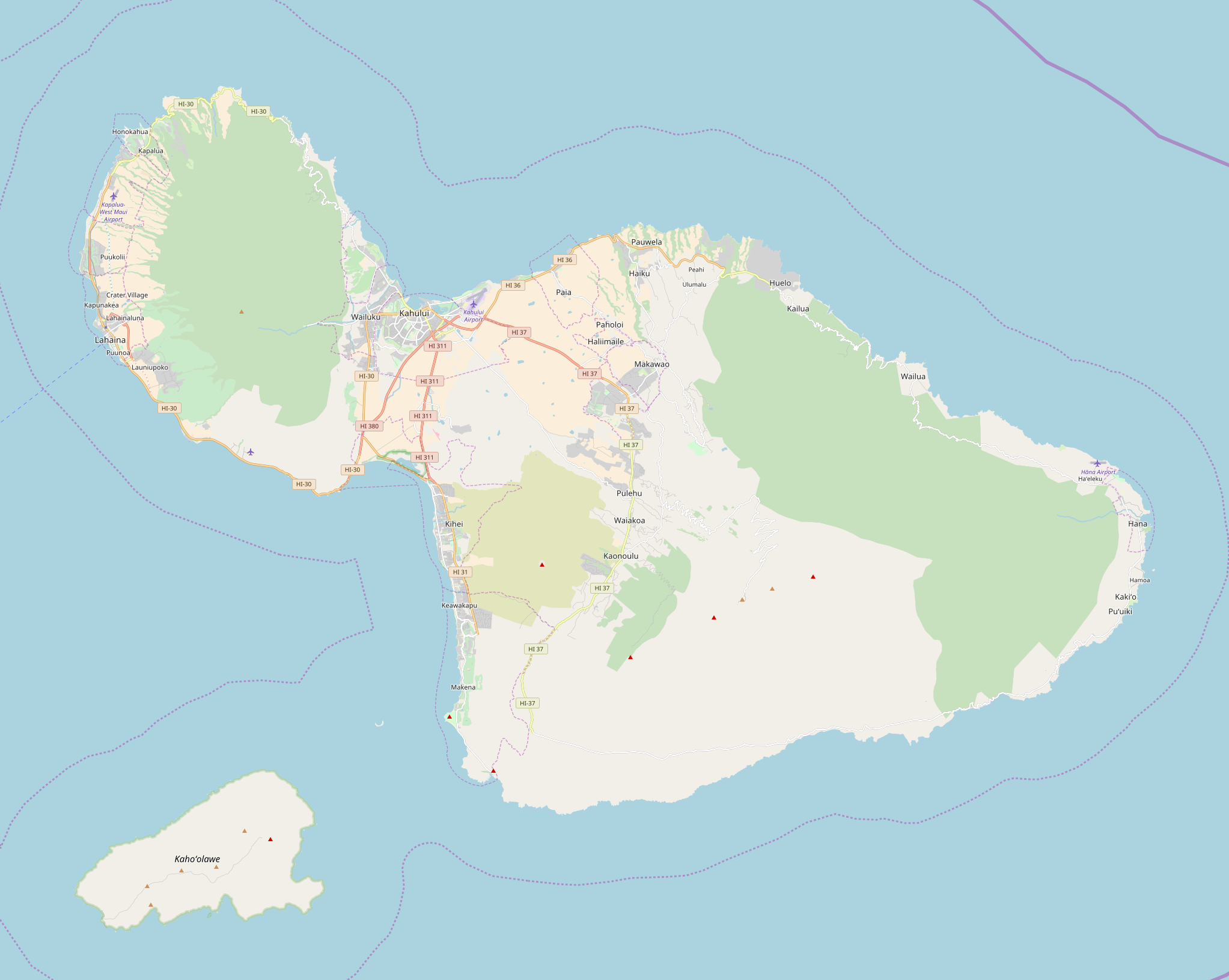
- Location within Maui Location within Hawaii
- Location: Cross Road, Keokea, Hawaii
- Coordinates: 20°42′35″N 156°21′11″W
- Built: 1907
- MPS: Chinese Tong Houses of Maui Island TR
- NRHP reference No.: 82000172
- HRHP No.: 50-50-10-01615

Significant dates
- Added to NRHP: November 15, 1982
- Designated HRHP: June 30, 1982

The Kwock Hing Society Hall (Ket Hing Society Building) (Chinese: 國興會館) is a two-story structure in Kula on Cross Road. It was erected in 1907 and was the first two-story structure in Kula. The current building that stands on the site is a replacement. It was placed on the Hawaii State Register of Historic Places on July 30, 1982 and the National Register of Historic Places on November 15, 1982 Numerous meetings were held at this site to support Dr. Sun Yat-sen. Near here, between mountains of Kula and the shoreline of Makena, Sun Mei (孫眉), Dr. Sun Yat-sen's brother, once leased a large ranch from the Hawaiian monarchy.

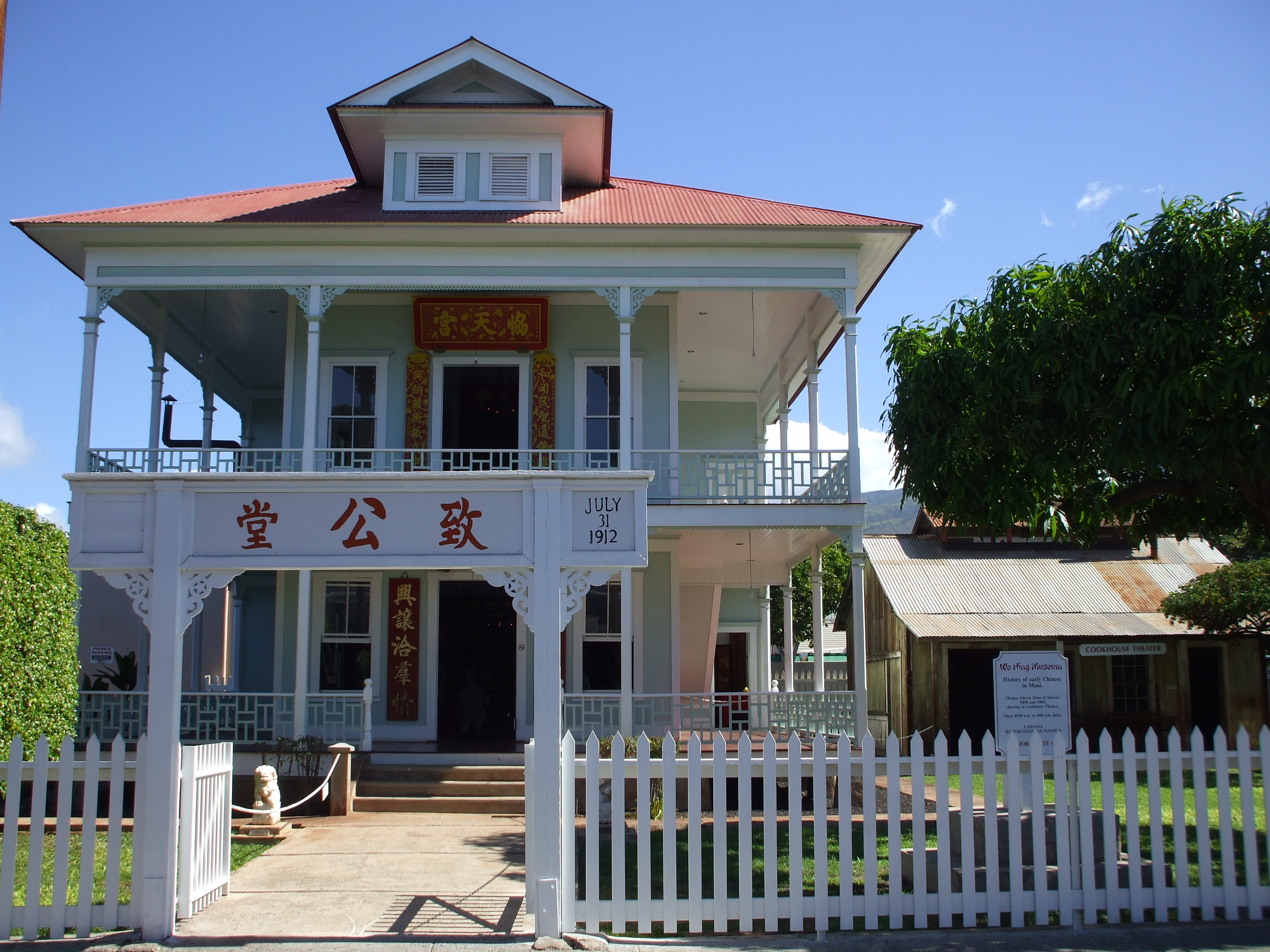
Wo Hing Temple.

== Wo Hing Society Hall ==
The Wo Hing Society Hall (Chinese: 和興會館) was a building located on Front Street in Lahaina built around 1912. The two story structure and cookhouse served as both a meeting place for Chinese immigrants working in Lahaina and offered religious services on the second floor. The use of the hall declined by the 1940s when many Chinese left for business opportunities in Honolulu. The building was restored in 1983 with the help of the Lahaina Restoration Foundation. It operated to the public under the name of Wo Hing Museum.

The hall was placed on the Hawaii State Register of Historic Places on July 30, 1982 and the National Register of Historic Places on November 15, 1982.

In August 2023, Wo Hing Society Hall was destroyed by the 2023 Hawaii wildfires.

== Other halls ==
Three other halls are said to have existed at one time or another. They include:

- Lin Hing Society Clubhouse in Ke'anae
- Tow Yee Kwock Society in Wailuku
- Chee Kung Tong Society clubhouse in Kipahulu

The exact times of existence and closure are unknown.
