= Yucho Chow =

Chinese-Canadian photographer

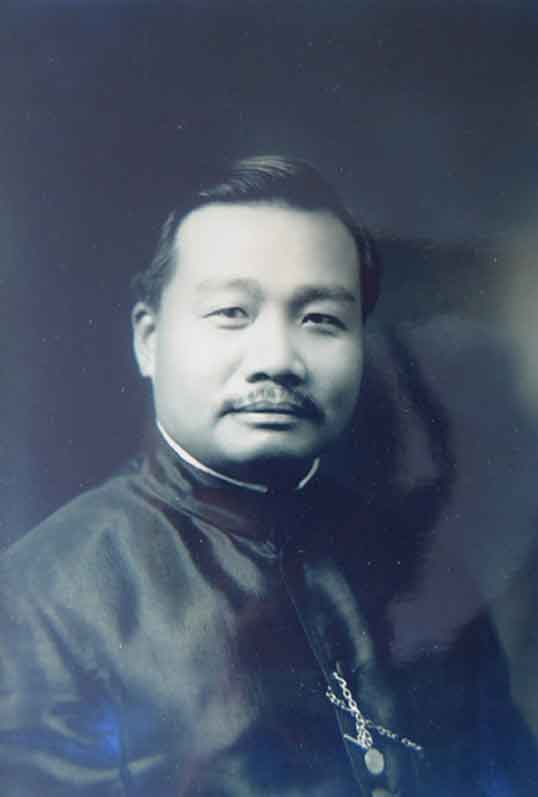
- Born: Yucho Chow; June 3, 1876; Kaiping, Guangdong, China
- Died: November 10, 1949 (aged 73); Vancouver, British Columbia, Canada
- Known for: Photographer

Yucho Chow (Chinese: 周耀初; pinyin: Zhōu Yàochū; 1876–1949) was a professional photographer who was Vancouver's first Chinese photographer and its most prolific. He ran a studio in Chinatown from 1906 to 1949.

== Life and career ==
Yucho Chow was born on 3 June 1876, in Hoy Ping (now called Kaiping), Guangdong province, China. Leaving his wife and two children behind, he arrived in Canada in February 1902, with the requirement of paying the $100 head tax. It is rumoured that he worked as a house servant while apprenticing with an unknown photographer. By 1906, he had the money to buy equipment and open up a photographic studio.

Although Chow was Chinese, he became as well a favourite photographer for other marginalized communities. He opened his doors to customers of South Asian, African, Indigenous, mixed-race and Eastern European descent. His marketing slogan, which he emblazoned on his business cards and on the signs at the front of his studio, was "Rain or Shine. Anything. Anywhere. Anytime." He often produced photographs in postcard format. Chow paid careful attention to his props and backdrops, using them to convey an aura of sophistication and success for his patrons. In 1935, his studio was extensively damaged by fire, and afterwards he changed his background from European opulence to a striking Art Deco style.

Over four decades, he captured photos of people across the arc of life's journey, from newborn babies to the recently deceased (whose photographs were sent back to family in China and Europe, and served as an informal death certificate). He recorded the faces of entertainers, politicians, families, children and soldiers. Outside the studio, he chronicled the community: celebrations, graduating school children, clan events, and celebrity visits. Frequently, he also was at the local train station, photographing newly arrived European immigrants.

Cultural researcher Naveen Gill stated, "Without him, I would say we had almost no photographs of the early South Asian community." In 1915, Chow photographed the funeral procession of the Sikh activist Mewa Singh.

In 1927, he created a composite photograph of the Hoy Ping Benevolent Association. Chow portrayed Dr. Sun Yat-Sen on one of his final visits to Vancouver. His photograph of the young tap dancer Howard Fair appeared in the Vancouver Sun in 1938. Later shown in the same newspaper was his 1943 image of the paratrooper Richard Keye Mar.

A number of Chow's children worked in the studio. His first assistant was his eldest daughter, Mabel Chow (1900–1940). Since the Yucho Chow Studio was open twenty four hours, Mabel worked long days and did everything from carrying the heavy tripod to developing the film. In the early years, she also was a frequent model for her father as he honed his skills on the camera.

In the 1930s, another daughter, Jessie Chow, joined the studio and was trained to hand paint photos using oils. At first she only painted in small articles like flowers and ties, but later expanded to colouring whole photographs.

Upon Chow's sudden death of chronic myocarditis in November 1949, his sons Peter and Philip Chow took over the studio and ran it until 1986. When they finally retired and closed the studio, all of the negatives, spanning almost eight decades, were discarded. Consequently, today most of Chow's work is hidden away in private family albums.

== Legacy ==
A life-sized image of Chow was placed in an East Pender street window in 2017.

In 2019, an month-long exhibition of 80 of his photographs was shown in Vancouver at the Chinese Canadian Museum. It took the curator, Catherine Clement, over eight years to find Chow's photographs which she uncovered one photo at a time, one family at a time.

A 344-page book of his photographs was published in 2019. Chinatown Through a Wide Lens: The Hidden Photographs of Yucho Chow showcases a wide range of these private photographs of diverse communities that were taken by him.

Artifacts from his Vancouver studios, including some portraits, are housed in the permanent collection of the Museum of Vancouver.

Yucho Chow Studio Locations
| Year | Location |
|---|---|
| 1907–1908 | 68 West Hastings |
| 1909–1913 | 5 West Pender |
| 1914–1929 | 23 West Pender |
| 1930–1950 | 518 Main Street |
| 1944–1945 | Vogue Photo Studio |
| 1950–1986 | 512 Main Street |

== Gallery ==
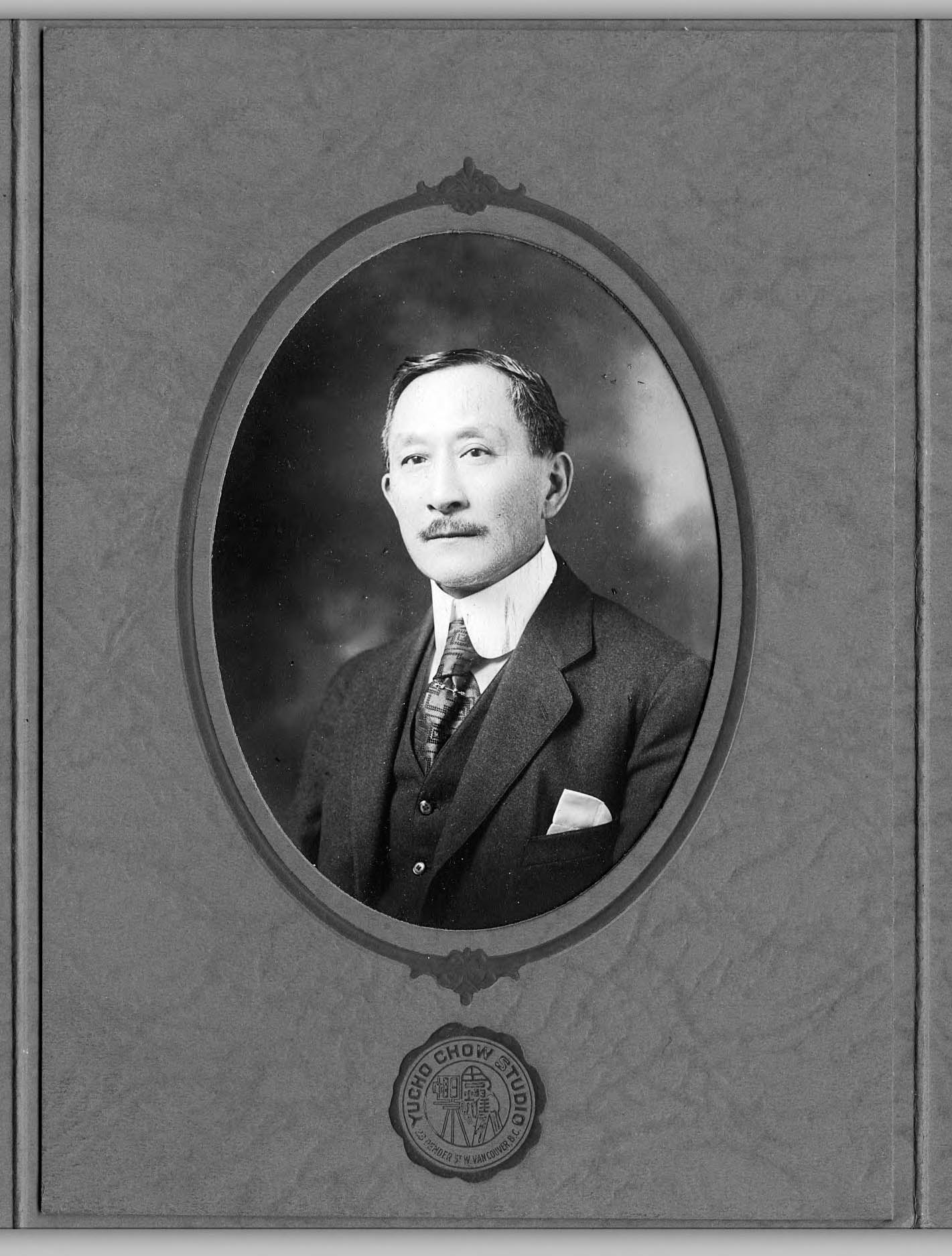
Won Alexander Cumyow, 1910.

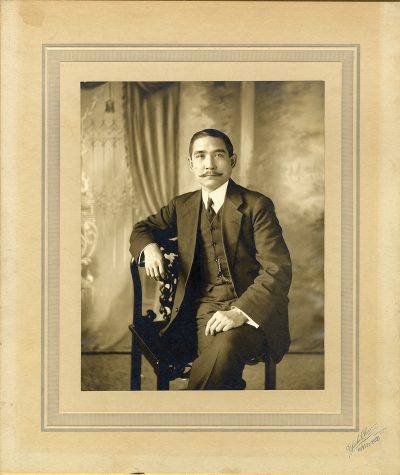
Dr. Sun Yat-sen, 1910 or 1911.

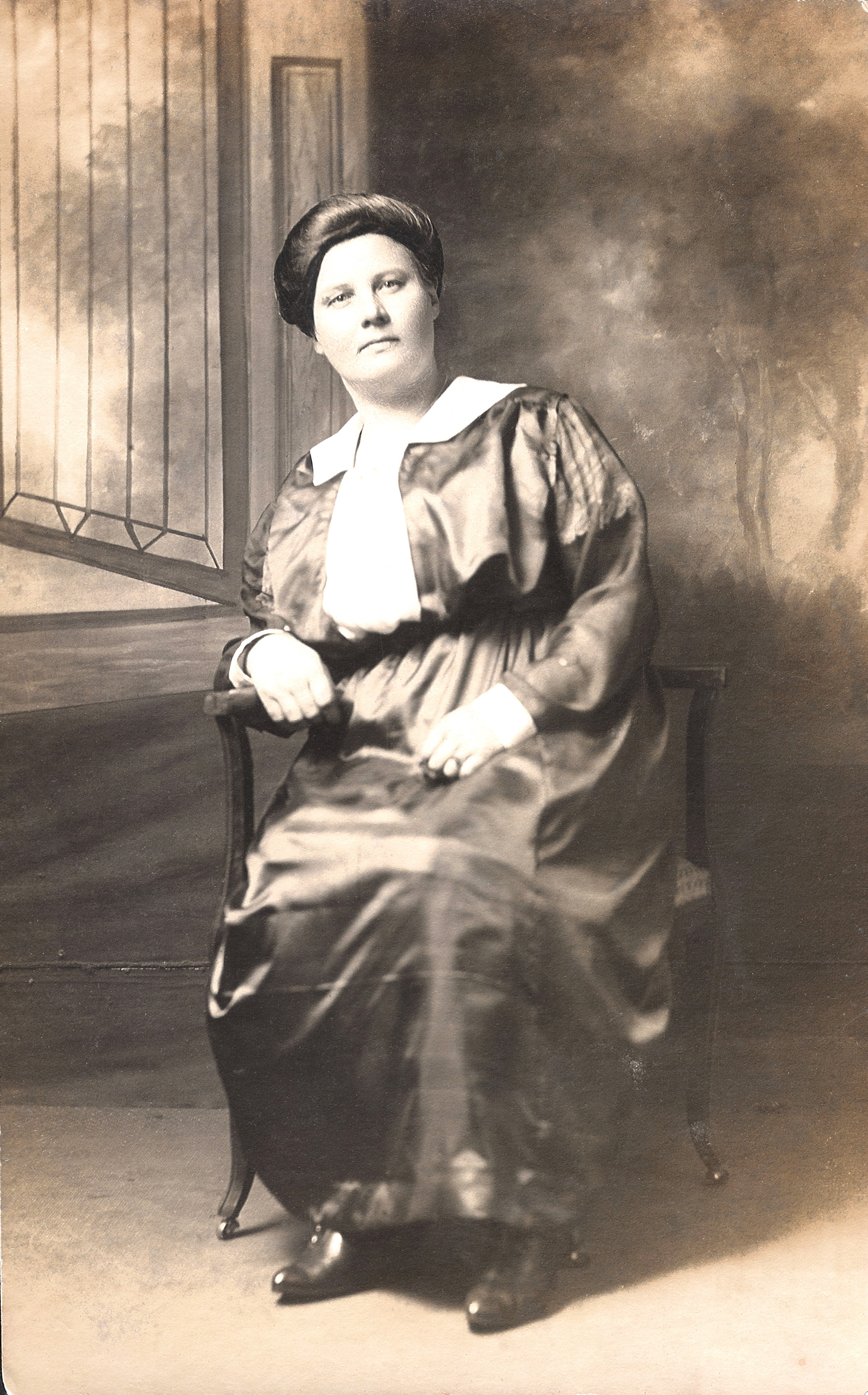
Ella Erickson, circa 1914.

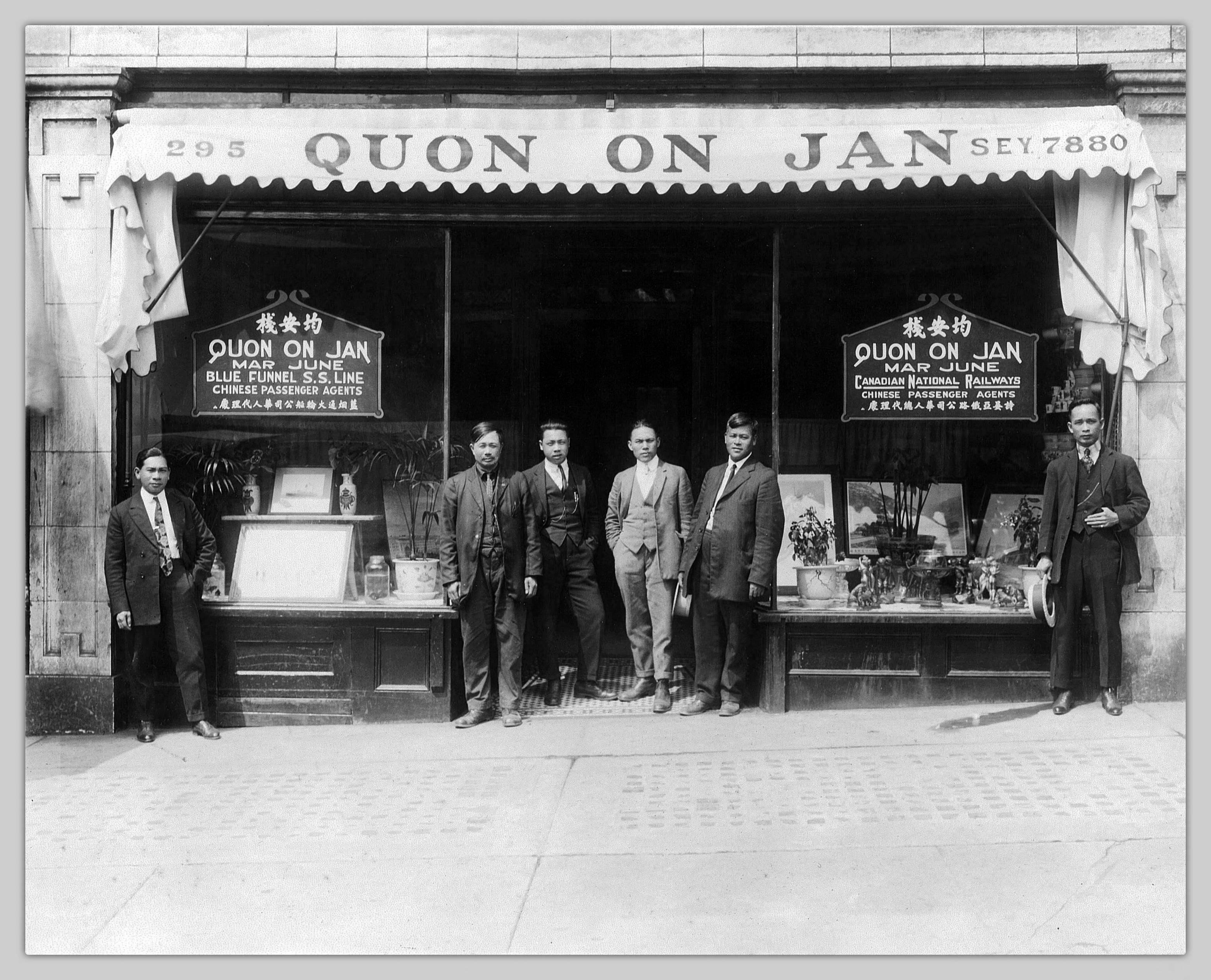
Quon On Jan Travel Agency, 1915.

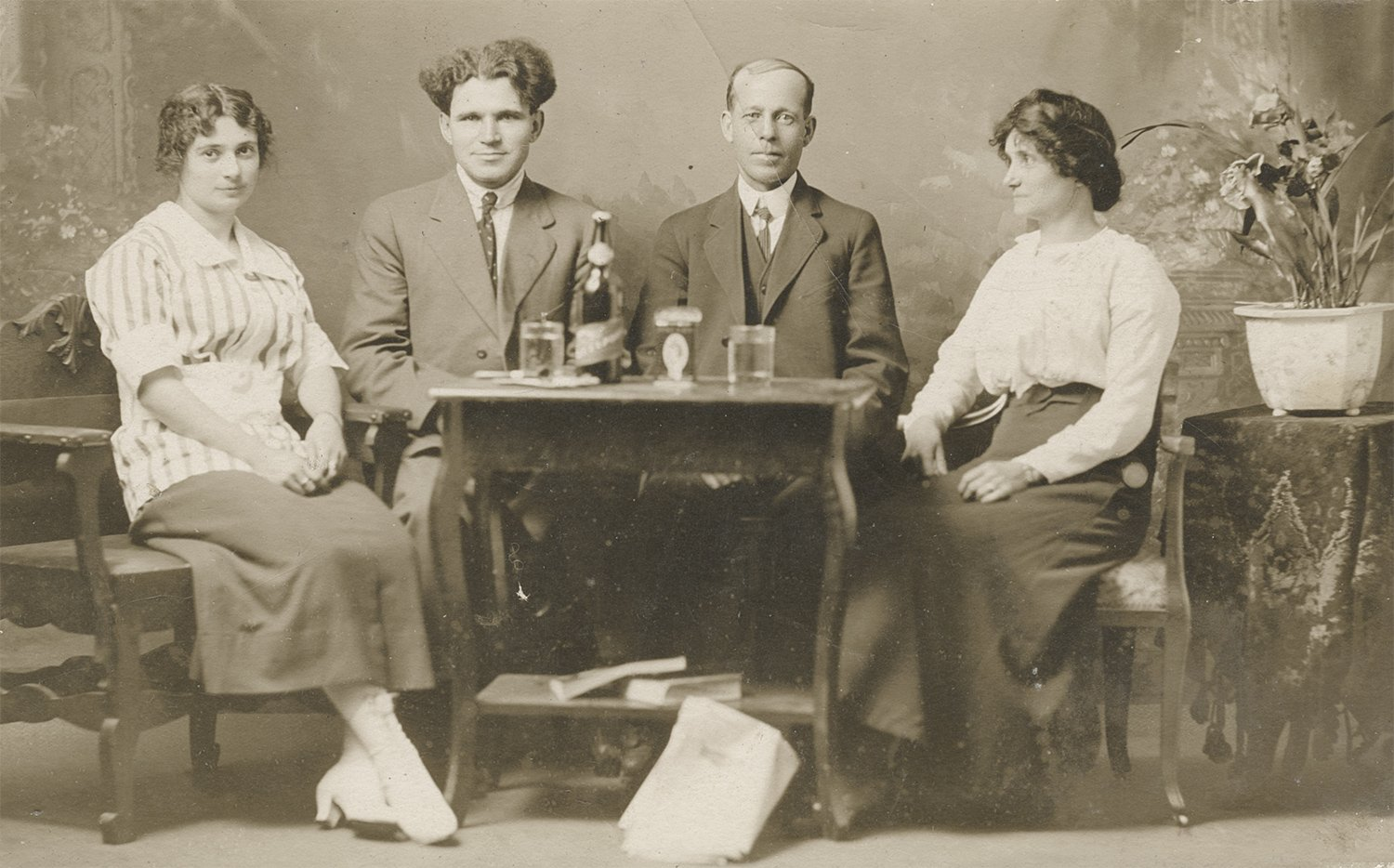
Unknown foursome, circa 1915.

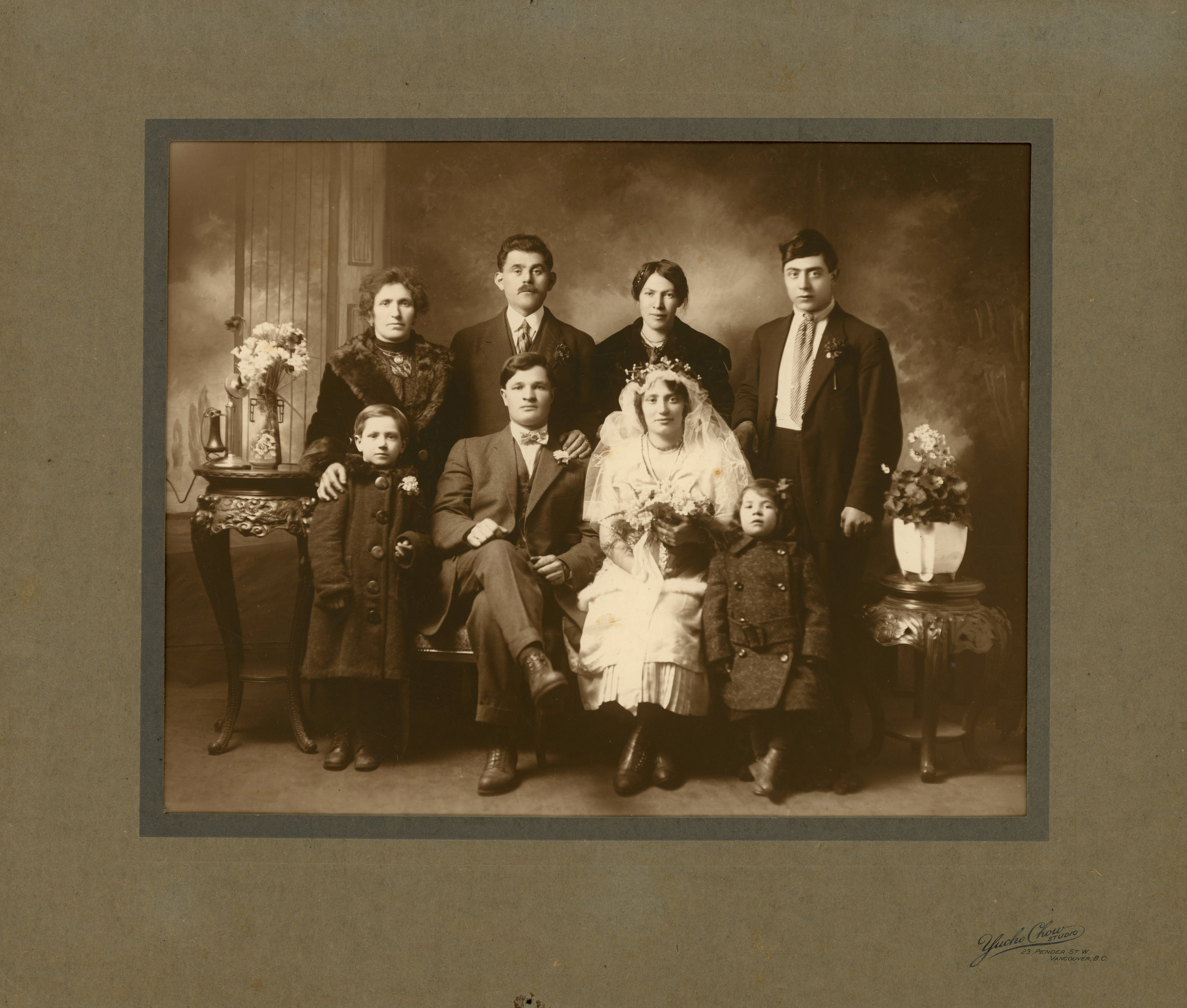
Italian wedding, 1918.

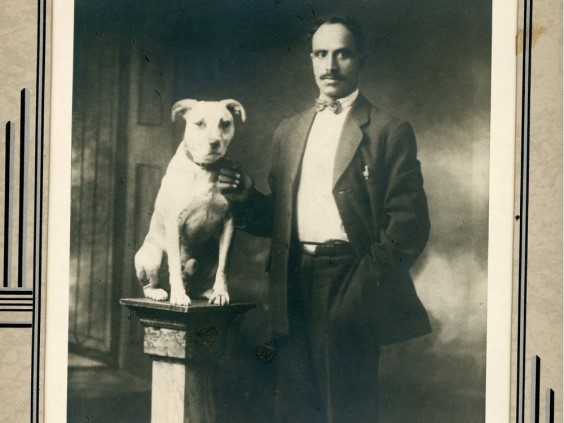
Ishar Singh Gill, 1918.

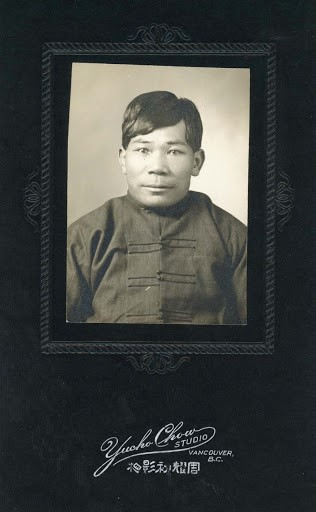
Wong York, circa 1918.

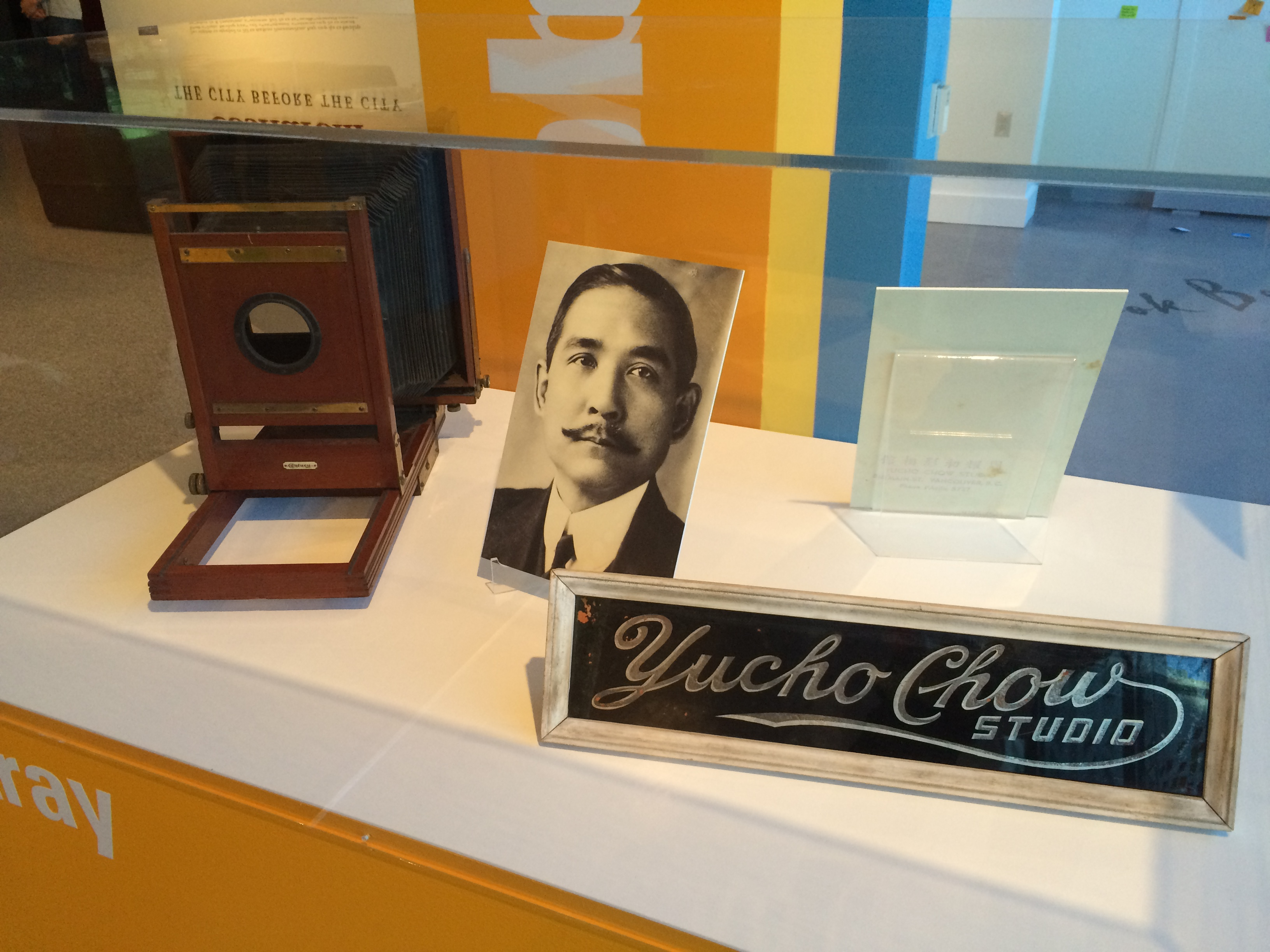
Yucho Chow artifacts at the Museum of Vancouver.
