= Chew (surname) =

- Language: Chinese (Cantonese, Southern Min, Mandarin), Korean

Other names
- Variant forms: English: Cho; Chinese: Zhou, Zhao, Qiū, Qiú, Chiu; Korean: Ju, Joo, Chu

Chew is a Chinese, English or Korean surname.

== Origins ==
As an English surname, Chew has three separate origins:

- A toponymic surname referring to a place in Billington, Lancashire. It was originally spelled Cho, from Middle English cho, which is possibly a descendant of Old English cēo meaning "fish gill".
- A toponymic surname referring to Chew Magna or Chew Stoke in Somerset.
- A nickname from Old English cio, which refers to smaller chattering species of crow, in particular the red-billed chough.

As a Chinese surname, Chew is a spelling of the pronunciation in different varieties of Chinese of a number of distinct surnames including the below ones, listed by their pronunciation in Mandarin Chinese:

- Zhōu (Chinese: 周), spelled Chew based on its pronunciation in the Teochew dialect of Southern Min (Peng'im: ziu¹; IPA: /ʦiu³/).
- Zhào (traditional Chinese: 趙; simplified Chinese: 赵), spelled Chew based on its pronunciation in Cantonese (Jyutping: ziu6; Cantonese Yale: jiuh; IPA: /t͡siːu̯²²/)
- Qiū (Chinese: 丘, 秋, 邱) or Qiú (Chinese: 裘, 仇), from a variant of the Mandarin Wade–Giles spelling Ch'iu

As a Korean surname, Chew might be an alternative spelling of the surnames spelled Ju (Korean: 주; Hanja: 朱, 周) or Chu (Korean: 추; Hanja: 秋, 鄒) in the Revised Romanization of Korean.

== Statistics ==
According to statistics cited by Patrick Hanks, there were 2,033 people on the island of Great Britain and 48 on the island of Ireland with the surname Chew as of 2011. In 1881 there had been 1,490 people with the surname in Great Britain, mainly in Lancashire, Yorkshire, Gloucestershire, and Bedfordshire.

The 2010 United States census found 8,905 people with the surname Chew, making it the 3,988th-most-common name in the country. This represented a decrease in relative frequency, but an increase in absolute numbers, from 8,516 (3,831st-most-common) in the 2000 Census. In both censuses, about four-tenths of the bearers of the surname identified as Asian, four-tenths as White, and 15% as Black. It was the 310th-most-common surname among respondents to the 2000 Census who identified as Asian.

== People ==
Notable people with the surname include:

=== Academia ===
- Chew Chin Hin (1931–2024), Singaporean physician
- Geoffrey Chew (musicologist) (fl. 1960s–present), British musicologist
- Geoffrey Chew (1924–2019), American theoretical physicist
- Chew Kheng Chuan (born 1957), Singaporean academic administrator
- Wee-Lek Chew (born 1932), Singaporean-born botanist

=== Film and television ===
- Chew Chor Meng (born 1968), Singaporean actor
- Richard Chew (born 1940), American cinematographer
- Robert F. Chew (1960–2013), American actor
- Sam Chew Jr. (fl. 1973–present), American actor

=== Government, politics, and military ===
- Ada Nield Chew (1870–1945), British suffragist
- Benjamin Chew (1722–1810), American jurist
- Betty Chew (born 1964), Malaysian politician
- Beverly Chew (1773–1851), American merchant and diplomat
- Charles Chew (1922–1986), American politician
- Henry F. Chew (1837–1918), American colonel in the American Civil War and New Jersey dentist
- Chew Men Leong (born 1967), Singaporean civil servant and naval admiral
- R. Preston Chew (1843–1921), Confederate officer in the American Civil War and West Virginia businessman
- Samuel Chew (captain) (c. 1750–1778), captain in the American Continental Navy
- Samuel Chew (justice) (1699–1744), Chief Justice of colonial Delaware
- Scott Chew, American politician in Utah
- Shou Zi Chew (born 1983), CEO of TikTok
- Sue Chew (1958–2024), American politician in Idaho
- Chew Swee Kee (1918–1985), Singaporean politician

=== Musicians ===
- Hans Chew (born 1975), American pianist
- Chew Jun Ru (fl. 2009–present), Singaporean erhu player
- Ray Chew (born c. 1958), American jazz musician
- Chew Sin Huey (born 1981), Malaysian pop singer

=== Sport ===
- Chew Choon Eng (born 1976), Malaysian badminton player
- Danny Chew (born 1962), American cyclist
- Fleur Chew (born 1981), Australian rower
- Jack Chew (1915–1984), English football full back
- Jackie Chew (1920–2002), English football winger
- Jennifer Chew (born 1983), American Paralympic wheelchair basketball player
- Danny Chew Ji Xiang (born 1987), Singaporean football defender
- Michael Chew (born 1962), Malaysian field hockey player
- Phillip Chew (born 1994), American badminton player, brother of Ryan Chew
- Chew Pok Cheong (born 1970), Malaysian cricketer
- Ryan Chew (born 1996), American badminton player, brother of Phillip Chew
- Chew Yiwei (born 1995), Malaysian diver

=== Other ===
- Chew Choon Seng (fl. 1972–present), Singaporean businessman
- Dennis Chew (born 1973), Singaporean radio host
- Elim Chew (born 1966), Singaporean clothing businesswoman
- Emily Chew (fl. 1977–present), American ophthalmologist
- Chew Gek Khim (born 1961), Singaporean businesswoman
- Chew Hoong Ling (born 1980), Malaysian writer and inspirational speaker
- John Chew (born 1947), Singaporean Anglican priest
- Paddy Chew (1960–1999), Singaporean with AIDS
- Ron Chew (born 1953), American community organizer
- Ruth Chew (1920–2010), American children's writer
- Thomas Foon Chew (1889–1932), Chinese American businessman

== See also ==
- Chew (disambiguation)
- Ng Poon Chew (1866–1931), Chinese-American writer and publisher (surname Ng, given name Poon Chew)
