= Chiu =

Chiu is a romanization of various Chinese surnames, based on different varieties of Chinese. It may correspond to the surnames spelled in the following ways in Mandarin pinyin:

- Zhào (趙) or Zhāo (招), from the Cantonese pronunciation
- Zhāng (張, 章), from the Hokkien pronunciation; more commonly spelled Teoh or Teo
- Zhōu (周), from the Hokkien pronunciation
- Qiū (丘, 秋, 邱) or Qiú (裘, 仇), from a variant of the Mandarin Wade–Giles spelling Ch'iu
- Jiù (就), from the Mandarin Wade–Giles spelling

== Notable people ==
- Angie Chiu (趙雅芝; born 1954), Hong Kong actress
- Only Won (born Baldwin Chiu, 1974), American musician, actor, and producer
- Chiu Ban It (周万一; 1918–2016), Singaporean Anglican bishop
- Barbara Chiu, Canadian table tennis player
- Ben Chiu (邱澤堃; born 1970), Taiwan-born American technology entrepreneur
- Bertha Chiu (1933–2009), Mexican javelin thrower
- Bondy Chiu (趙學而; born 1973), Hong Kong actress and singer
- Bryan Chiu (born 1974), Canadian football player; centre in the Canadian Football League
- Caroline Chiu (趙善穎; born 1984), Hong Kong swimmer
- Chiu Chang (邱彰; born 1950), Taiwanese Democratic Progressive Party politician
- Chiu Chi-ling (趙志淩; born 1943), Hong Kong actor
- Chiu Chih-wei (邱志偉; born 1972), Taiwanese Democratic Progressive Party politician
- Chiu Ching-chun (邱鏡淳; born 1949), Taiwanese Kuomintang politician, magistrate of Hsinchu County
- Chiu Chuang-chin (邱創進; born 1956), Taiwanese Democratic Progressive Party politician
- Chiu Chuang-huan (邱創煥; 1925–2020), Taiwanese politician, Vice-Premier from 1981 to 1984
- Chiu Chuang-liang (邱創良; born 1955), Taiwanese Democratic Progressive Party politician
- Chiu Chui-cheng (邱垂正), Taiwanese politician, Mainland Affairs Council member
- Chiu Chun Kit (趙俊傑; born 1983), Hong Kong football defender
- Connie Chiu (born 1969), Hong Kong-born Swedish fashion model
- David Chiu (politician) (邱信福; born 1970), American politician in California
- David Chiu (poker player) (邱芳全; born 1960), American professional poker player
- David Jung-Kuang Chiu (1936–2006), American academic
- Deacon Chiu (邱德根; 1924–2015), Hong Kong businessman
- Donna Chiu (裘海正; born 1965), Taiwanese singer
- Frederic Chiu (born 1964), American concert pianist
- Chiu Fu-sheng (邱復生; born 1947), Taiwanese real estate developer and film producer
- Gian Chiu (born 1989), Filipino basketball player
- Chiu Hin Chun (趙顯臻; born 1994), Hong Kong rower
- Chiu Hin-kwong (招顯洸; 1928–2024), Hong Kong doctor and politician
- Hong-Yee Chiu (丘宏義; born 1932), Shanghai-born American astrophysicist
- Chiu I-huan (邱奕寰; born 1990), Taiwanese football striker
- Chiu Kuo-cheng (邱國正; born 1953), Taiwanese general
- Chiu Jeng-jiann (裘正健), Taiwanese politician, Deputy Minister of Science and Technology
- Jenny Chiu (born 1995), American-Mexican soccer player and reporter
- Keina Chiu (趙慧奈; born 1995), Japanese-Chinese television news journalist
- Chiu Keng Guan (周青元), Malaysian film director
- Kim Chiu (張金珠; born 1990), Filipina actress and singer
- Melissa Chiu (born 1972), Australian museum curator
- Paul Chiu (邱正雄; 1942–2025), Taiwanese Kuomintang politician
- Chiu Ping-kun (邱炳坤; born 1964), Taiwanese athlete and judge in the sport of archery
- Prince Chiu (邱勝翊; born 1989), Taiwanese singer
- Roy Chiu (邱澤; born 1981), Taiwanese actor
- Rebecca Chiu (趙詠賢; born 1978), Hong Kong professional squash player
- Samson Chiu (趙良駿), Hong Kong film director
- Sharlene Chiu, Canadian television reporter
- Chiu Tai-san (邱太三; born 1956), Taiwanese Democratic Progressive Party politician
- Tom Chiu (邱崇德; born 1971), Taiwan-born American music composer and violinist
- Chiu Tsui-ling (邱翠玲; born 1994), Taiwanese singer in Japan
- Chiu Tzu-tsung (邱賜聰), Taiwanese politician, Atomic Energy Council member
- Wah Chiu (趙華), Hong Kong-born American biophysicist
- Chiu Wen-ta (邱文達; born 1950), Taiwanese medical educator and politician
- Chiu Yi (邱毅; born 1956), Taiwanese Kuomintang politician, member of the Legislative Yuan for Kaohsiung
- Chiu Yi-ching (born 2003), Taiwanese archer
- Chiu Yi-ying (邱議瑩; born 1971), Taiwanese Democratic Progressive Party politician
- Chiu Yu-hung (邱育宏; born 1994), Taiwanese football goalkeeper
- Chiu Yu Ming (邱于銘; born 1991), Hong Kong football goalkeeper

=== Fictional characters ===
- Chiu, net idol alter ego of Chisame Hasegawa, from the manga/anime franchise Negima!
- Candy Chiu, a character from Gravity Falls

== See also ==
- Chew (disambiguation)
- Chic (disambiguation)
- Chik (disambiguation)
- Chu (disambiguation)
