= Jim Chou =

Jim, Jimmy, James, or variation, Chou, Chu, Choo, or variant; may refer to:

== People ==
- Jim Chou, former CTO of Shutterstock
- James J. Chou (born 1970; Chinese: 周界文; pinyin: Zhōu Jièwén), Chinese academic
- James C. Y. Chu (born 1935; Chinese: 祝基瀅; pinyin: Zhù Jīyíng; Wade–Giles: Chu Chi-Ying), Taiwanese politician
- Jim Chu (born 1959; simplified Chinese: 朱小荪; traditional Chinese: 朱小蓀; pinyin: Zhū Xiǎosūn; Wade–Giles: Chu Hsiao-Sun) former Chief Constable of Vancouver
- Jim Chu (entrepreneur), founder and CEO of dloHaiti
- Jimmy Choo Yeang Keat (born 1948; English: Jimmy Choo; simplified Chinese: 周仰杰; traditional Chinese: 周仰傑; pinyin: Zhōu Yǎngjié; Wade–Giles: Chou Yang-Chieh; Tai-lo: Tsiu Ióng-kia̍t; Choo Yeang Keat), British-Chinese-Malaysian fashion designer, founder of the eponymous fashion company
- Chun-Ting Chou (born 2006; English: Jim Chou or Jimmy Chou; Chinese: 周雋庭; pinyin: Zhōu Jùntíng; Jyutping: Zau1 Syun5 Ting4), Taiwanese racing driver

== Other uses ==
- Jimmy Choo (company), British fashion company, founded by the eponymous fashion designer

== See also ==
- James (disambiguation)
- Jimmy (disambiguation)
- Jim (disambiguation)
- Choo (disambiguation)
- Chou (disambiguation)
- Chu (disambiguation)
