= Chew (disambiguation) =

Chew usually refers to chewing, the process by which food is crushed and ground by teeth.

Chew may also refer to:

== Places ==
- River Chew, in Somerset, England

== Arts, entertainment, and media ==
- Chew (comics), an American comic book series
- Chew (film), an upcoming film
- The Chew, an American cooking-themed talk show

== Other uses ==
- Chew (surname), a Chinese, English, and Korean surname (including a list of people with the surname)
- Chew, another name for taffy (candy)
- USS Chew (DD-106), a United States Navy destroyer

== See also ==
- Chewa (disambiguation)
- Chewing (input method)
- Chewing tobacco
- Choo (disambiguation)
- Choo Choo (disambiguation)
- Chow (disambiguation)
- CIU (disambiguation)
