= List of libraries in Taipei =

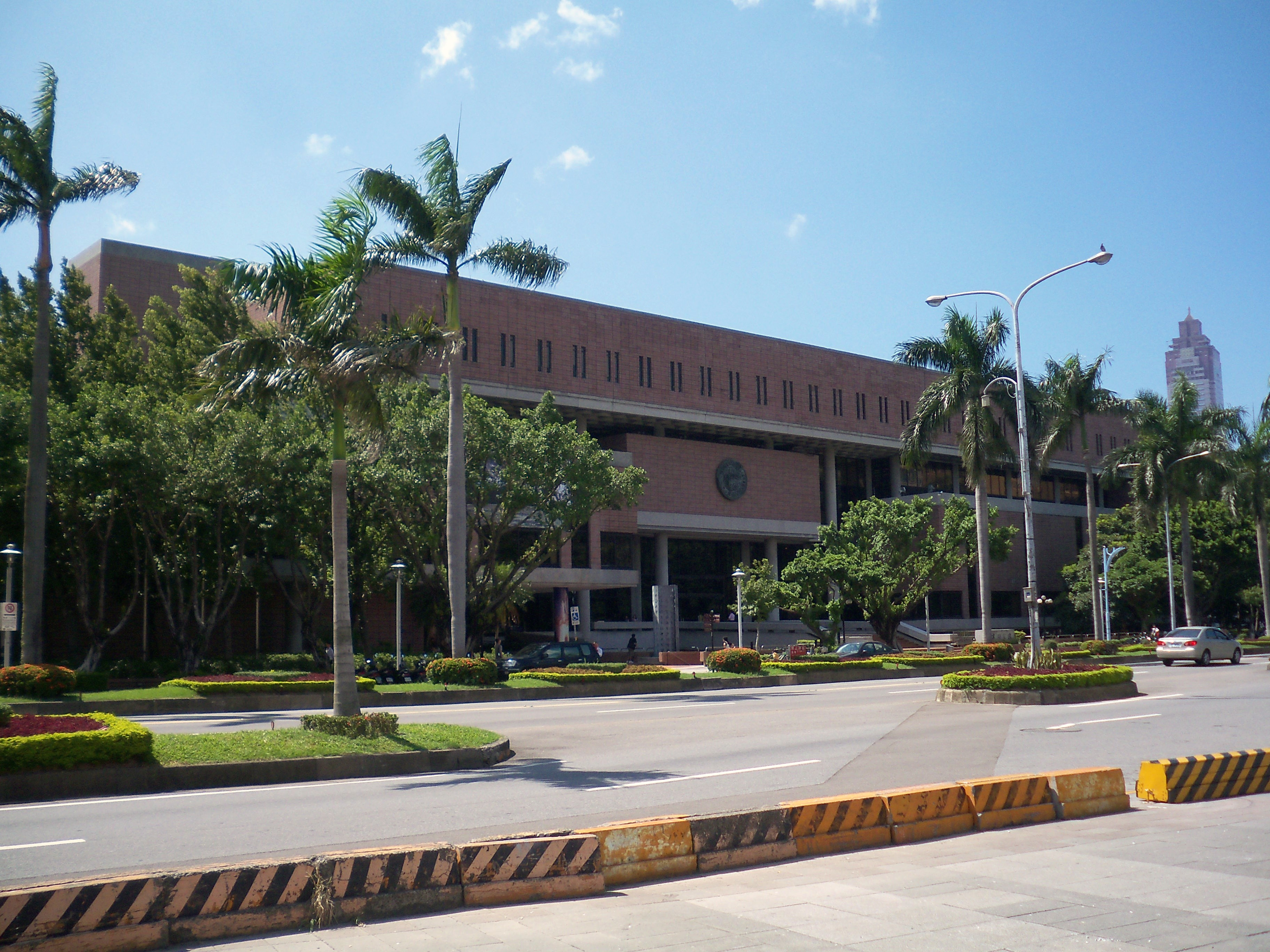
National Central Library headquarters

Libraries in Taipei include:

- National Central Library, the national library of Taiwan
- National Taiwan University of Science and Technology library
- Taipei Medical University library
- Taipei Public Library Beitou Branch
- Taipei Main Public Library

== See also ==
- List of schools in Taipei
- List of universities and colleges in Taipei
- List of libraries in China
