= Qiu =

Qiu may refer to:

- Qiū (surname), Chinese surnames written 丘, 邱, or 秋
- Qiú (surname), Chinese surnames written 仇 or 裘
- Qiu County, in Hebei, China
- Kǒng Qiū (Chinese: 孔丘), better known as Confucius
- Qiu!, a 2005 album by the ambient post-rock band Windsor Airlift
