= Chu2 =

Chu2 may refer to:

- A short name for Love, Chunibyo & Other Delusions
- CHU^{2}, a nickname for Chiyu Tamade; a character from the media franchise BanG Dream!

== See also ==
- Chu (disambiguation)
- Chu Chu (disambiguation)
