= Zhou (surname) =

Zhōu / Chow / Chou
- Zhou surname in regular script
- Romanisation: Zhōu (Mandarin Pinyin); Zau1 (Cantonese Jyutping); Chiu (Hokkien Pe̍h-ōe-jī)
- Pronunciation: [ʈʂóʊ] (Mandarin) [tsɐw˥] (Cantonese) [tɕiu˦] (Hokkien) [tsɛ̂] (Wu) [ɕɯː] (Japanese)
- Language: Chinese, Korean, and Vietnamese

Origin
- Language: Old Chinese
- Derivation: Zhou dynasty

Other names
- Variant forms: Zhou (Mandarin China); Chou (Mandarin Taiwan); Chow, Chau (Hong Kong); Chao (Macao); Chew, Chiu (Hokkien, Teochew); Châu (Vietnamese); Ju, Joo (Korean); Ciu, Djioe, Tjio, Tjioe, Tjoe (Indonesian); Shū (Japanese)
- Derivatives: Cahyadin, Ciwijaya, Cokrorahajo, Gimin, Harto, Johari, Juanda, Juanita, Mulyono, Prajoko, Prasetyo, Sastrowiharjo (Chinese Indonesian)

Zhōu (Chinese: 周; pinyin: Zhōu; Wade–Giles: Chou¹) is a Chinese-language surname. In places which use the Wade–Giles romanization such as Taiwan, Zhou is usually spelled as Chou, and it may also be spelled as Chiau, Chau, Chao, Chew, Chow, Chiu, Cho, Chu, Jhou, Jou, Djou, Jue, Jow, Joe, or Tseu, depending on regional pronunciation.

In classical genealogy, the main origin of the surname 周 (Zhou) derives from the royal members of the house of Zhou, originally surnamed 姬 (Ji). They were the descendants of King Ping of Zhou, adopted the surname 周 (Zhou) after the fall of the Zhou dynasty.

Pronunciations of 周 surname
Pronunciation	Region	Dialect / Language
Zhou	China	Standard Mandarin Chinese
Chou	Taiwan	Standard Mandarin Chinese
Tseu	Jiangsu, Zhejiang	Wu
Chew	Fujian, Hainan, Guangdong	Min, Hakka
Chow	Guangdong	Yue (Cantonese)
Shu	Japan	Japanese
Ju	Korea	Korean

Zhou ranks as the 10th most common surname in mainland China as of 2019. In 2013 it was found to be the 10th most common name, shared by 25,200,000 people or 1.900% of the population, with the province with the most being Hunan.

Derived from the Zhou dynasty, it has been one of the ten most common surnames in China since the Yuan dynasty. It is the 5th name on the Hundred Family Surnames poem. The Korean surname, "Ju" or "Joo", and The Vietnamese surname, "Châu" or "Chu", are both derived from and written with the same Chinese character (周). The character also means "around". Zhōu also stands for other, rare Chinese family names, 舟, 州, and 洲.

== History ==
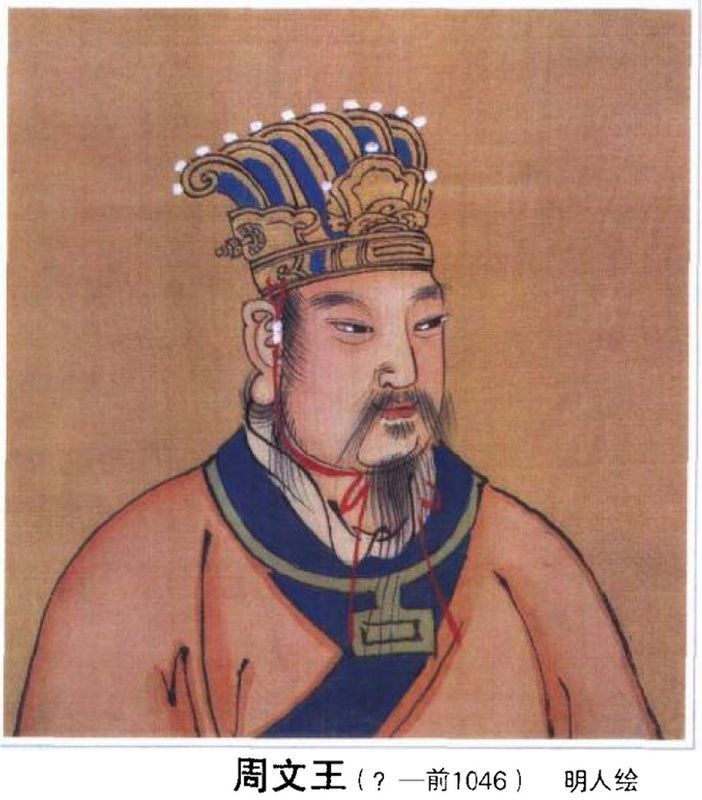
King Wen of Zhou, one of the apical ancestors of this clan

According to historical records, Zhou surname originates from the imperial kinsmen of the Zhou dynasty. The original surname (xing) of the royal Zhou family was Ji (姬). In 256 B.C., the Qin dynasty conquered Zhou and put Rufen under the jurisdiction of Runan County. Ji Yong, a descendant of King Ping of Zhou, which lived on the system of enfeoffment in Rufen, changed his surname to Zhou to commemorate the merits and virtues of his ancestors. The descendants of Emperor Nan of the Zhou dynasty, who were called the Zhou family after the Zhou dynasty had been destroyed, also took on the Zhou surname. Since then the Zhou surname has become a common family name in Runan.

Non-Han people who adopted the name Zhou include the Helu and Pu surnames of the Xianbei nationality in (the Northern Zhou) and the Xitong and Shuhu surnames of the Mongolian nationality in the Yuan dynasty.

People with the Zhou surname could be found all over the country due to enfeoffment and migration through the ages, especially from out Runan. In general the migration of the Zhou family followed the pattern of "west to east" and "south to north".

== Prominent individuals with the surname Zhou ==
=== Modern day ===
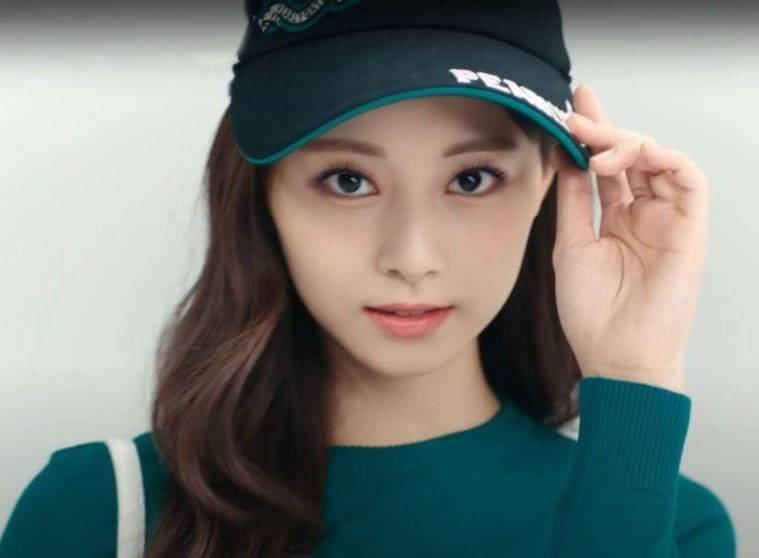
Chou Tzu-yu (周子瑜)

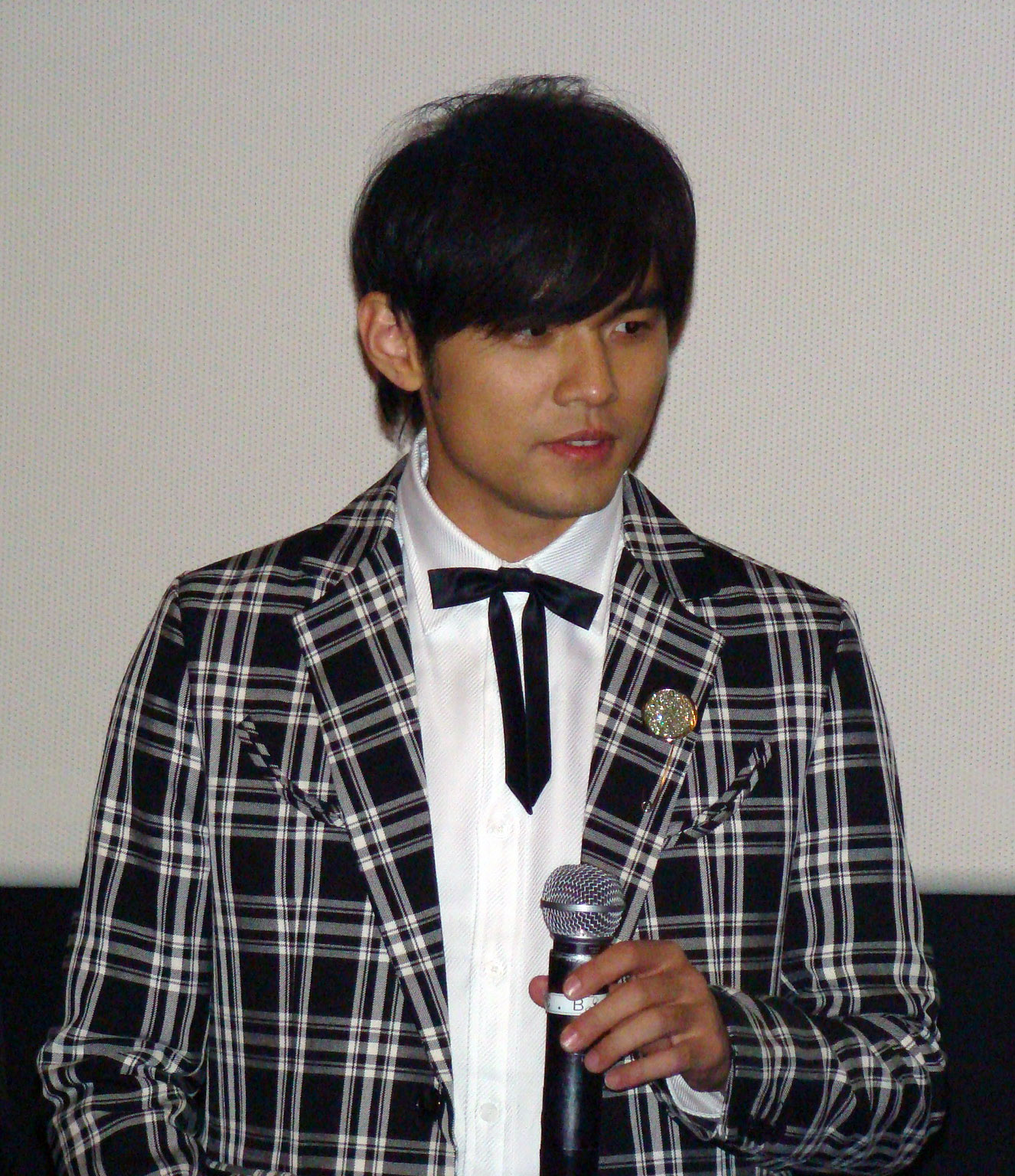
Jay Chou (周杰倫)

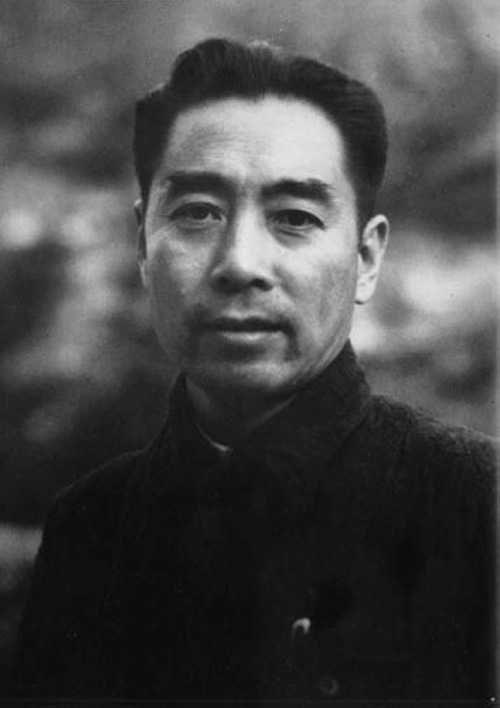
Zhou Enlai (周恩来)

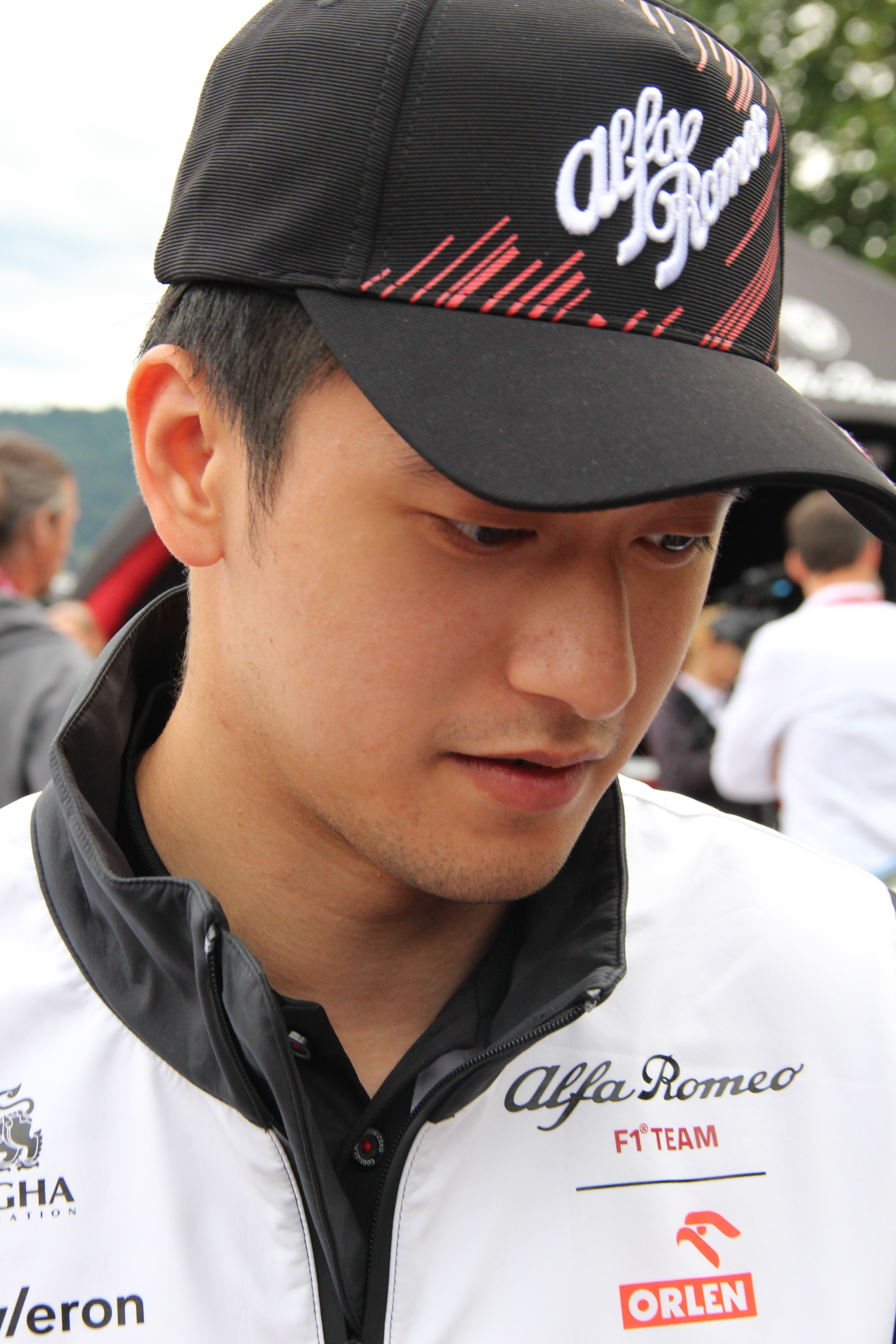
Zhou Guanyu (周冠宇)

- Alex Chow 周永康 (born 1990), former Secretary General of the Hong Kong Federation of Students
- Bibi Zhou 周筆暢 (born 1985), Chinese singer and actress
- Charles Djou 周永康 (born 1970), Hawaii politician
- Chew Shou Zi 周受资 (born 1983), CEO of TikTok
- Eric Chou 周興哲 (born 1995), Taiwanese singer-songwriter
- Francis Jue (born 1963), actor
- Jay Chou 周杰倫 (born 1979), Taiwanese musician, singer, songwriter and director
- Jimmy Choo 周仰傑 (born 1948) world-famous Malaysian-born London shoe designer
- John Allen Chau (1991–2018), American explorer and missionary
- Kathy Chow 周海媚 (1966–2023), actress
- Kelsey Chow (born 1991), actor from Disney's Pair of Kings
- Malese Jow (born 1991), Chinese-American teen actress
- Chou Tzuyu 周子瑜 (born 1999), Taiwanese singer, dancer, and member of the South-Korean girl group Twice
- Chou Wenchung 周文忠 (1923–2019), composer, professor at Columbia University and founder of the Center for United States-China Arts Exchange
- Chow Yunfat 周潤發 (born 1955), famous Hong Kong actor
- Nancy Zhou, American violinist
- Nemo Zhou / Qiyu Zhou / akaNemsko 周齐宇 (born 2000), Chinese-born Canadian chess player (WGM, FM) and streamer
- Agnes Chow, Hong Kong student activist and politician
- Natalie Chou (born 1997), American basketball player
- Niki Chow, actress
- Norm Chow, American football coach
- Osric Chau, Canadian actor
- Pakho Chau, Hong Kong singer-actor
- Silas Chou, Hong Kong billionaire
- Stephen Chow, famous Hong Kong actor and director
- Steve Chou (Zhōu Chuánxióng), Taiwanese composer and singer.
- Veronica Chou (born 1984/1985), Hong Kong businesswoman
- Vic Zhou, actor, singer
- Vivian Chow, singer
- Wakin Chau (Emil Chau), musician, singer
- Wei-Liang Chow, mathematician
- Wen Tsing Chow, missile guidance scientist
- William Kwai Sun Chow, Martial artist
- Xiangyu Zhou (born 1965), Chinese mathematician
- Chau Chin-fu (born 1952), Taiwanese judoka
- Chau Hoi Wah (born 1986), female Hong Kong badminton player
- Zhou Enlai (Tseu En-le in Wu dialect) (1898–1976), first Premier of the People's Republic of China
- Zhou Fengsuo, human rights activist
- Zhou Guangzhao, former president of Chinese Academy of Sciences, theoretical physicist
- Zhou Guanyu (Tseu Kue Nyi in Shanghai dialect), (born 1999), Formula 1 driver
- Zhou Haiyan (born 1990), Chinese female middle-distance runner
- Zhou Jianren, politician, younger brother of Lu Xun
- Zhou Jieqiong (born 1998), vocalist of the South-Korean girl group Pristin
- Zhou Long, composer
- Zhou Mi, Chinese female badminton player
- Zhou Mi, Chinese pop male singer from the boy band Super Junior-M
- Zhou Peiyuan, former president of Peking University, theoretical physicist
- Zhou Qi, Chinese basketball player
- Zhou Shen, singer
- Zhou Shuren, writer using the pseudonym Lu Xun
- Zhou Wennan, revolutionary and judge
- Zhou Xiaochuan, economist
- Zhou Xiaoping, writer, social commentator
- Zhou Xiaoping (artist), Australian artist, winner of the 1999 Archibald Prize People's Choice Award
- Zhou Xiaoyan (1917–2016), soprano and voice teacher
- Zhou Xuan (1918–1957), actress
- Zhou Xun, actress
- Zhou Yanfei (born 1990), Paralympic swimmer sister of Zhou Ying (born 1989), also a Paralympic swimmer
- Zhou Yahui, businessman, entrepreneur
- Zhou Ye (born 1998), Chinese actress
- Zhou Yi (disambiguation)
- Zhou Yongkang (born 1942), member of the 17th CPC Politburo Standing Committee
- Zhou Youguang (1906–2017), Chinese linguist and sinologist
- Zhou Zuoren, writer, brother of Lu Xun
- Zhou Zhennan, rapper, singer, songwriter and dancer
- Chou Tien-chen, Taiwanese badminton player

=== Historical ===
Alphabetized by surname, then by given name.

- Zhou Fang, military general of the state of Eastern Wu
- Zhou Tai, (d. 223) military general of the state of Eastern Wu
- Zhou Tong (archer), famous archer and teacher of Song dynasty general Yue Fei
- Zhou Yafu, Han dynasty general
- Zhou Yu, (175–210) general of Eastern Wu
- Empress Xiaosu (1430–1504), concubine of Emperor Yingzong and mother of the Chenghua Emperor

=== Fictional ===
Alphabetized by surname, then by given name.

- Knives Chau (Zhou Knives), fictional character from the Scott Pilgrim franchise
- Zhou Tong (Water Margin), fictional character from the Chinese classic the Water Margin
- Zhou Botong, a fictional character from the Legend of the Condor Hero and Return of the Condor Heroes novels
- Zhou Cang, fictional character from the Romance of the Three Kingdoms
- Zhou Mei-Ling, fictional character from the Blizzard Entertainment video game Overwatch

== Associated places ==
Zhouzhuang (周庄), Suzhou, Jiangsu China

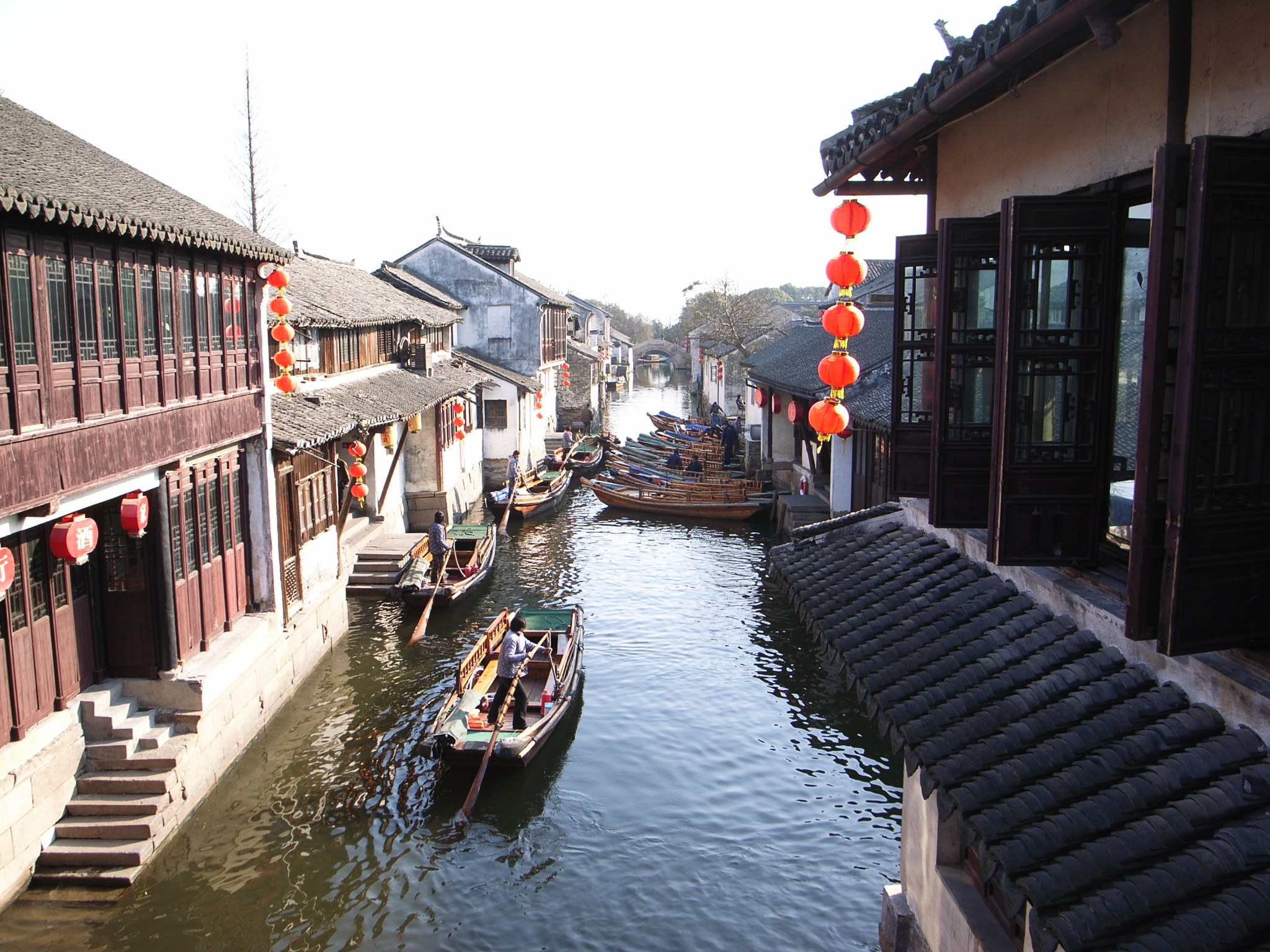
Zhouzhuang, Suzhou China

Zhouzhuang (pronounced as "Tseu-Zoan" in the Wu dialect) is a water-town in Jiangsu under the administration of Suzhou city and is known for its canals and its role in heritage tourism. The town is 900 years old, with 60 original brick archways and 100 original courtyards preserved from that time.

The town derives from the fact that the land on which it is built was donated by a certain person from the Zhou clan, known as Zhou Digong, during the Song dynasty.

Chew (Zhou) Clan Jetty (姓周桥), Georgetown Penang, Malaysia

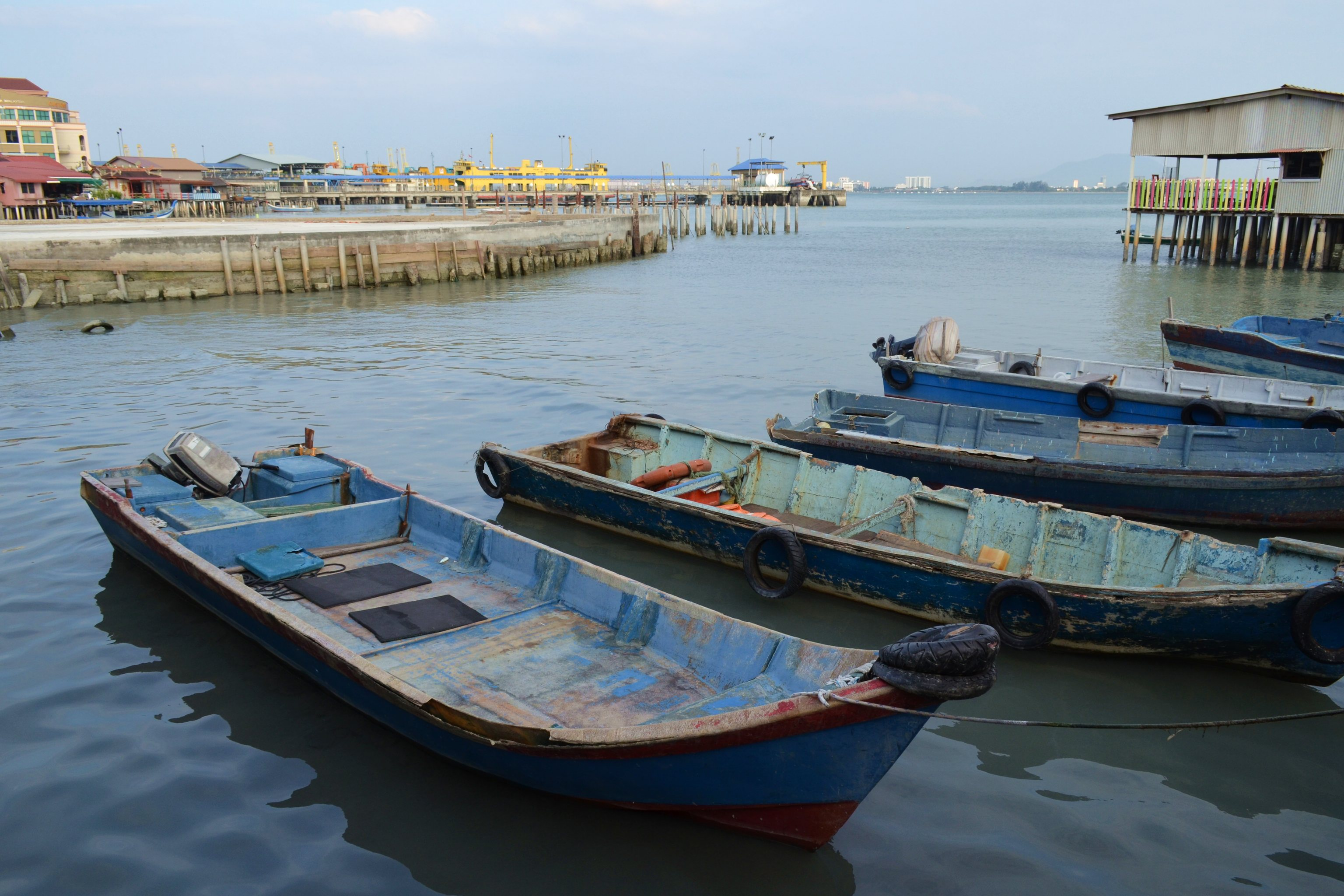
View from Chew jetty in Penang, Malaysia

There is a jetty on Penang, Peninsular Malaysia, which now serves as a famous tourist attraction, and which is named after the Zhou clan. It is largest and most visited of the clan jetties of Penang and is rendered in English as the Chew Clan Jetty, following the regional pronunciation of the surname Zhou 周 in the Minnan dialect, since the clan in question originates from Tong'An, Xiamen. The clan jetties form part of the core area of the Georgetown UNESCO World Heritage site.

== See also ==
- Zhou clan of Runan
