= Chu (Korean name) =

- Hangul: 추
- Hanja: 秋; 鄒
- RR: Chu
- MR: Ch'u

Chu, also spelled Choo, is a Korean family name.

== Overview ==
The 2000 South Korean Census found 55,309 people with the family name Chu. It could be written with either of two hanja, indicating different lineages. A study by the National Institute of the Korean Language based on year 2007 application data for South Korean passports found that 55.1% of applicants with this surname chose to spell it in Latin letters as "Chu" in their passports, while 43.1% spelled it as "Choo".

=== Hanja meaning "autumn" (秋) ===
This character was originally used to write the Chinese family name now pronounced Qiū in Mandarin. According to the 2000 Census, 54,667 people in 17,142 households had this family name, making it the 64th-most common family name out of 287 family names distinguished by the census.

=== Hanja meaning "State of Zou" (鄒) ===
This character was originally used to write the Chinese family name now pronounced Zōu in Mandarin, and before that the name of the historical State of Zou. Though Zōu is a fairly widespread family name in China, where a 2007 survey found it to be the country's 67th-most common family name, the same character is very rarely used as a Korean family name; the 2000 South Korean census found only 642 people in 209 households who used this character to write their family name, making it the country's 190th-most common family name. None of them reported their bon-gwan.

=== People ===
People with the family name Chu or Choo include:

- Alex Chu (born 1979), Korean-Canadian singer and actor
- Audrey Chu (stage name Audrey Nuna, born 1999), American singer and rapper
- Choo Byung-jik (born 1949), South Korean politician
- Choo Chang-min (born 1966), South Korean film director
- Chunghi Choo (born 1938), South Korean jewelry designer and metalsmith
- Choo Ga-eun (born 2001), South Korean sports shooter
- Chu Ga-yeoul (born 1968), South Korean singer
- Chu Hwa-il (born 1932), South Korean former sports shooter
- Choo Hyo-joo (born 2000), South Korean footballer
- Choo Ja-hyun (born 1979), South Korean actress
- Chu Jung-hyun (born 1988), South Korean footballer
- Chu Ki-young (born 1977), South Korean retired javelin thrower
- Choo Kyung-ho (born 1960), South Korean government official and politician
- Choo Mi-ae (born 1958), South Korean politician
- Choo Min-yeol (born 1999), South Korean footballer
- Choo Nan-Yool, South Korean taekwondo practitioner
- Chu Sang-mi (born 1973), South Korean actress
- Choo Seung-gyun (born 1974), South Korean basketball coach
- Choo Shin-soo (born 1982), South Korean former baseball player
- Chu So-jung (stage name Exy, born 1995), South Korean singer and actress, member of girl group WJSN
- Chu Song-woong (1941–1985), South Korean actor
- Choo Soo-hyun (born 1988), South Korean actress
- Choo Sung-ho (born 1987), South Korean footballer
- Choo Sung-hoon (better known as Yoshihiro Akiyama, born 1975), Zainichi Korean mixed martial artist
- Choo Waihong (died 2023), Singaporean corporate lawyer, feminist and travel writer
- Chu Ye-jin (born 2001), South Korean actress
- Choo Young-woo (born 1999), South Korean actor
