= Ho-jin =

- Hangul: 호진
- RR: Hojin
- MR: Hojin

Ho-jin is a Korean given name.

People with this name include:

- Chun Ho-jin (born 1960), South Korean actor
- Kim Ho-jin (born 1970), South Korean actor
- Park Ho-jin (born 1976), South Korean football player
- Ju Ho-jin (born 1981), South Korean football player
- Lee Ho-jin (businessman) (born 1962), South Korean businessman
- Lee Ho-jin (footballer) (born 1983), South Korean football player
- Seo Ho-jin (born 1983), South Korean short track speed skater
- Jung Ho-jin (born 1984), South Korean football player

== See also ==
- List of Korean given names
