= David Chiu =

David Chiu may refer to:

- David Chiu (poker player) (born 1960), professional poker player based in California, United States
- David Chiu (politician) (born 1970), San Francisco city attorney and former representative for California's 17th State Assembly district
- David Jung-Kuang Chiu, dean of Hofstra University in Hempstead, New York, United States until 2001

== See also ==
- David Chu (disambiguation)
