= Chuu (disambiguation) =

Chuu is a South Korean singer and television personality, and a former member of girl group Loona.

Chuu may also refer to:

- Bardo, the Buddhist concept of "intermediate existence" between death and rebirth sometimes romanized in Japanese as chūu
- Chuu (One Piece) (also spelled "Choo"), character in the One Piece manga and anime series
- Chuu (single album), tenth single album by Loona

== See also ==
- Chu (disambiguation)
- Chiu (disambiguation)
- Choo (disambiguation)
