= Chuang Yung-ming =

Taiwanese writer (1942–2020)

Chuang Yung-ming (traditional Chinese: 莊永明; simplified Chinese: 庄永明; April 3, 1942 – August 7, 2020) was a scholar of Taiwan's literature and history. He was also a writer and a pioneer in collecting historical materials in Taiwan and director of both the Taipei City Archives and the Wu San-lien Taiwan Historical Foundation.

== Life and career ==
Chuang Yung-ming was born in and spent his childhood in Dadaocheng, Taipei. He attended the Junior High Division of Chien Kuo High School and Taiwan Provincial Taipei Junior College of Business, and went on to study at the Craft Division of the Art and Craft Department of the National Taiwan Academy of Arts. After graduation, he worked as an accountant for Tatung Company’s affiliations. In his spare time, he began writing about the history of his hometown and submitted articles to newspapers. He also became a tour guide. After retiring from his accounting job, Chuang devoted himself to writing about Taiwan’s local history and was invited by the China Times to write a column titled “First in Taiwan”, which would later be compiled into a book. The “Dadaocheng Area Tour” historical-story-telling session led by Chuang had a total of more than 10,000 participants.

== Residence ==
The Chuang family’s house, Chuang Hsieh-Fa Grocery Store (built in the 1920s), has been designated by the Department of Cultural Affairs, Taipei City Government a historic site under the name “Dadaocheng Qianqiu Street Stores—Chuang Hsieh-Fa”, the first grocery store in Taipei to be designated a historic site. Chuang transformed the house into the “Chuang Hsieh-Fa Harbor Area Historical Lecture Pavilion”.

== Contributions ==
In 2005, Chuang wrote a biography, The Life Story of Hahn Shyr-Chyuan, which introduces the life story of Dr. Hahn Shyr-Chyuan, a doctor who practiced in Tainan City. In September 2014, Hahn's descendants donated Chuang’s manuscript to National Museum of Taiwan Literature, making it his first manuscript to be preserved in a national museum.

On August 7, 2020, Chuang died at the age of 79. On that day, Minister of Culture Lee Yung-te paid tribute to Chuang for his life of discovering, collecting, promoting and nurturing Taiwan's literature and history. On August 23, President Tsai Ing-wen personally commended Chuang's outstanding contributions to the inheritance and promotion of Taiwanese culture, praising him as “the first person in Taiwanese public history”.
