= Dezhu =

Dezhu or Deshu is a Chinese given name. Notable people with the name include:

- Hu Deok-juk (born 1949), South Korean chef
- Li Dezhu (born 1943), Chinese politician
- Liu Dezhu (born 2000), Chinese middle-distance runner
- Qiu Deshu (born 1948), Chinese contemporary artist
