= Jonathan Chu =

Jonathan Chu, John Chu, or variation, may refer to:

- Jonathan Chu (tennis) (born 1983), American professional tennis player
- Jon M. Chu (full name: Jonathan Murray Chu), an American film director and screenwriter
- John Chu, an American science fiction writer
- Jonathan Chu, a violinist formerly in the Christian rock band Skillet
- John Chu Nai-cheung, Director of Audit (Hong Kong)

== See also ==
- Chu (disambiguation)
- Jon (disambiguation)
- John (disambiguation)
- Jonathan (disambiguation)
