= Chu =

Chu or CHU may refer to:

== Chinese history ==
- Chu (state) (c. 1030 BC–223 BC), a state during the Zhou dynasty
- Western Chu (206 BC–202 BC), a state founded and ruled by Xiang Yu
- Chu Kingdom (Han dynasty) (201 BC–70 AD), a kingdom of the Han dynasty
- Huan Chu (403–404), a state founded by Huan Xuan during the Eastern Jin dynasty
- Ma Chu (907–951), a kingdom during the Five Dynasties and Ten Kingdoms period
- Da Chu (1127), a puppet state installed by the Jurchen-led Jin dynasty during the Jin–Song wars

== People ==
=== Surnames ===
- Chu (Chinese surname)
- Chu (Vietnamese surname)
- Zhu (surname) or Chu
- Chu (Korean name)
- Ju (Korean surname) or Chu

== Places ==
- Hubei or Chu, a province of China
- Hunan or Chu, a province of China
- Chũ, a town and district capital in Bac Giang Province, Vietnam

=== Rivers ===
- Chu River (Tributary of Wei River), a river of Ningxiang County, Hunan Province, China
- Chu River (Anhui), a river in Anhui and Jiangsu provinces, in China
- Chu (river), a river in Kyrgyzstan and Kazakhstan
- Nam Sam River or Chu River, a river in eastern Laos and the North Central Coast region of Vietnam
- Lục Nam River or Chũ River, a river in the Northeast region of Vietnam

== Facilities and structures ==
- Houston County Airport (Minnesota)'s IATA code
- CHU (radio station), time signal, Ottawa, Canada
- Chung Hua University, Hsinchu, Taiwan
- Centre Hospitalier et Universitaire de Yaoundé (University Teaching Hospital of Yaounde), Cameroon
- CHU UCLouvain Namur, a university hospital, Namur, Belgium

== Music ==
- "Chu" (song), a song by f(x)
- Zhu (percussion instrument) or Chu, an ancient Chinese instrument

== Other uses ==
- Christelijk-Historische Unie or Christian-Historical Union, a former Protestant political party in the Netherlands
- Containerized housing unit, a shipping container converted to living space
- China Unicom's NYSE stock symbol CHU
- Old Church Slavonic's ISO 639 alpha-3 code
- Chu (Daoism), religious practices named chú (廚, "kitchen")
- Centigrade Heat Unit, an obsolete measure of heat

== See also ==
- Choo (disambiguation)
- Chuu (disambiguation)
- "Mr. Chu" (A Pink song)
- Shu, Kazakhstan (disambiguation)
