= Chu (Vietnamese surname) =

Chu ([tɕū] or Châu ([tɕə̄w]) is a Vietnamese surname. It is transliterated as Zhou (for Chu) and Zhu (for Châu) in Chinese, and Ju in Korean.

Châu is also a unisex Vietnamese given name.

Chau is the anglicized variation of Châu.

== Notable people with the surname Chu/Châu ==
- Chu Văn An
- Chinh Chu - Vietnamese-American finance executive
- Châu Văn Tiếp (Châu Doãn Ngạnh), 18th century Vietnamese military commander
- Chau Giang (Chau Tu Giang), professional poker player.
- Chau Nguyen (born 1973), Vietnamese-American news anchor
- François Chau (born 1959), Cambodian-American actor
- Hong Chau, American actress
