= DloHaiti =

Company

dloHaiti
- Industry: Consumer Goods
- Founded: 2012
- Founder: Jim Chu (entrepreneur)
- Headquarters: Port-au-Prince, Haiti
- Key people: Jim Chu (CEO)
- Products: Drinking Water
- Website: http://www.dlohaiti.com/

dloHaiti, Inc. is a private company that provides safe, affordable drinking water to consumers in underserved neighborhoods across Haiti. The company is building a network of wells serviced by solar-powered kiosks that are equipped with hi-tech purification systems and information technology. dloHaiti is led by a team of Haitian and Silicon Valley entrepreneurs with previous water experience in Haiti, and is supported by several prominent international investors.

== Background ==
Due to severe inadequacies in Haiti's municipal water system, drinking water is often treated centrally and delivered by trucks to low income neighborhoods lacking access to water. Trucked water is expensive (US 12¢ per gallon) and of uncertain quality, and delivery schedules may be unreliable. dloHaiti's approach aims to reduce costs while increasing quality and convenience by offering continuous access to purified water.

== Business ==
dloHaiti uses decentralized water purification and distribution through kiosks to reduce reliance on water transport by trucks. The company utilizes energy-efficient water treatment technology and renewable solar energy to power its facilities. dloHaiti's distribution model aims to provide local employment opportunities and a reliable supply of cleaner, cheaper drinking water.

In May 2013, dloHaiti launched a 40-facility pilot for a duration of 18–24 months. A post-pilot scale-up of 300 kiosks could reach 5-8% of the population of Haiti who are beyond the limits of public infrastructure.

== Socioeconomic impact ==
It is estimated that dloHaiti's pilot project will create over 600 jobs, 95% of which will be outside of Port-au-Prince. The scale-up phase is projected to create an additional 3,790 jobs and serve over one million beneficiaries, saving low-income Haitian consumers over $2 million annually.

== Funding ==
dloHaiti raised $3.4 million in Series A Funding from Leopard Capital's Leopard Haiti Fund, the International Finance Corporation's InfraVentures Fund, the Netherlands Development Finance Company (FMO), Miyamoto International, and Jim Chu, dloHaiti's CEO and Founder.

== Awards ==
In May 2013, dloHaiti was named a finalist in Imagine H_{2}O's annual water-tech innovation competition that recognizes the world's most promising water startups.
