= Ju (Korean surname) =

Korean family name (주)

- Hangul: 주
- Hanja: 朱; 周
- RR: Ju
- MR: Chu
- IPA: [tɕu]

Ju ([tɕu]), also spelled Joo or Chu, is a Korean family name. Its meaning differs based on the hanja used to write it.

== Overview ==
As a family name, Ju may be written with either of two hanja, one meaning "red" (朱; 붉을 주), and the other meaning "around" (周; 두루 주). The former has one bon-gwan (Wu Yuan, China), while the latter has four (Sangju, Gyeongsangbuk-do; Chogye-myeon, Hapcheon-gun, Gyeongsangnam-do; Cheorwon-gun, Gangwonnam-do; and Anui-myeon, Hamyang-gun, Gyeongsangnam-do). The 2000 South Korean census found 215,010 people with this family name.

In a study by the National Institute of the Korean Language based on 2007 application data for South Korean passports, it was found that 50.6% of people with this surname spelled it in Latin letters as Ju in their passports, and another 46.9% spelled it as Joo. Rarer alternative spellings (the remaining 2.4%) included Chu and Choo.

People with these family names include:

=== Chu ===
- Chu Jong-chol, North Korean table tennis player
- Chu Ki-chol (1897–1944), Korean Presbyterian minister
- Chu Yo-han (1900–1976), South Korean poet
- Chu Yong-ha (1908–?), North Korean politician and diplomat
- Chu Yung-kwang (1920–1982), South Korean footballer

=== Joo ===
- Brian Joo (born 1981), Korean American singer
- Joo Da-young (born 1995), South Korean actress
- Joo Dai-min (born 1988), South Korean professional footballer
- Joo Don-sik (1937–2022), South Korean politician
- Dong Moon Joo, Korean American businessman
- Joo Hee-jung (born 1977), South Korean basketball player
- Joo Hee-sun, South Korean music video director
- Joo Ho-young (born 1960), South Korean judge and politician
- Joo Hyeon-woo (born 1990), South Korean footballer
- Joo Hyong-jun (born 1991), South Korean speed skater, Olympic silver medalist
- Joo Hyun (born 1943), South Korean actor
- Joo Hyun-hee (born 1982), South Korean badminton player
- Joo Hyun-jae (born 1989), South Korean footballer
- Joo Hyun-jung (born 1982), South Korean professional archer, Olympic gold medalist
- Joo Hyun-mi (born 1961), South Korean trot singer
- Joo Hyun-myeong (born 1997), South Korean racewalker
- Hyung-ki Joo (born 1973), Korean-British pianist
- Joo Ik-seong (born 1992), South Korean professional footballer
- Joo In-young (born 1978), South Korean actress
- Joo Jeong-hun (born 1994), South Korean para taekwondo practitioner, Paralympic bronze medalist
- Joo Jin-mo (actor, born 1958), South Korean actor
- Joo Jin-mo (actor, born 1974), South Korean actor
- Joo Jiwan (born 1965), South Korean craft artist
- Joo Jong-hyuk (actor, born 1983), South Korean actor and singer
- Joo Jong-hyuk (actor, born 1991), South Korean actor
- Judy Joo (born 1974), Korean-American celebrity chef
- Joo Ki-hwan (born 1981), South Korean footballer
- Joo Min-jin (born 1983), South Korean short track speed skater, Olympic gold medalist
- Joo Min-kyu (born 1990), South Korean footballer
- Joo Min-kyung (born 1989), South Korean actress
- Haemin Sunim (born Ryan Bongseok Joo, 1973), Korean-American Buddhist monk and writer
- Joo Sae-hyuk (born 1980), South Korean table tennis player, Olympic silver medalist
- Joo Sang-wook (born 1978), South Korean actor
- Joo Seong-ha (born 1975), North Korean journalist and defector
- Joo Soon-ahn (born 1970), South Korean sailor
- Joo Sung-hwan (born 1990), South Korean footballer
- Joo Swn-lan (born 1974), South Korean volleyball player
- Joo Won-gyu (born 1975), South Korean pastor, novelist, writer
- Joo Woo-jae (born 1986), South Korean actor and model
- Joo Yang-ja (1931–2025), South Korean politician and medical doctor
- Joo Ye-rim (born 2011), South Korean child actress
- Joo Yea-na (born 1990), South Korean professional volleyball player
- Joo Young-dae (born 1973), South Korean para table tennis player, Paralympic gold medalist
- Joo Young-dai (born 1966), South Korean biathlete
- Joo Young-hoon (born 1969), South Korean singer-songwriter and television personality
- Joo Young-sam (born 1966), South Korean gymnast

=== Ju ===
- Ju Chol-gyu, North Korean politician
- Ju Chun-sam (born 1950), North Korean archer
- Ju Ho-jin (born 1981), South Korean footballer
- Ju Hui (born 1989), South Korean handball player
- Ju Hye-ri (born 1991), South Korean cross-country skier
- Ju Hyeong-gyeol (born 1939), South Korean long-distance runner
- Ju Hyeong-kwang (born 1976), South Korean baseball coach and former player
- Ju Hyo-sim (born 1998), North Korean footballer
- Ju Jeong-hyeon (born 1974), South Korean equestrian
- Ju Jeung-ryu (1926–1980), South Korean actress
- Ju Ji-hoon (born 1982), South Korean actor
- Ju Kwang-min (born 1990), North Korean footballer
- Ju Kwang-youn (born 1985), South Korean footballer
- Ju Kwon (born 1995), Chinese-born South Korean baseball player
- Ju Kyu-chang (born 1939), North Korean politician
- Ju Sang-jeom (1926–1981), South Korean boxer
- Ju Sang-song (born 1933), North Korean politician
- Ju Se-jong (born 1990), South Korean footballer
- Ju Seung-jin (born 1975), South Korean footballer
- Ju Si-gyeong (1876–1914), Joseon Dynasty linguist

== See also ==
- List of Korean family names
