= Chow =

Chow may refer to:

- Selected set of nutrients fed to animals subjected to laboratory testing
- Chow Chow, a dog breed
- Chow, a slang term for food in general (such as in the terms "chow down" or "chow hall")
- Chow test, a statistical test for detecting differences between trends in time series
- Chow (unit), an obsolete unit of mass in the pearl trade in Mumbai
- Chow (website), a popular online food discussion site
- Chow, an alternate name for the star Beta Serpentis
- Chow, a 2024 short horror film starring Ben Platt
- Mr. Chow, an upscale Chinese restaurant chain
- Chow (surname), an English surname, as well as a Latin-alphabet spelling of various Chinese surnames
- The Chinese word 炒 (stir-fry) as in chow mein

== See also ==
- Ciao
- Chew (disambiguation)
- Chao (disambiguation)
