= Chiu Chuang-liang =

Taiwanese politician

Chiu Chuang-liang MLY
- 邱創良
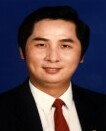
- Chiu Chuang-liang

Member of the Legislative Yuan
- In office 1 February 1999 – 31 January 2005
- Constituency: Taoyuan County

Personal details
- Born: 10 September 1955 (age 70)
- Party: People United Party (since 2010)
- Other political affiliations: Democratic Progressive Party (2007–2010); Non-Partisan Solidarity Union (2004–?); People First Party (2000–2002)
- Education: National Taipei University of Business; Tamkang University
- Occupation: politician

Chiu Chuang-liang (Chinese: 邱創良; born 10 September 1955) is a Taiwanese politician.

Chiu studied at the National Taipei University of Business and later earned a master's of arts in finance at Tamkang University.

He served on the Taoyuan County Council prior to his 1998 election to the Legislative Yuan. He joined the People First Party in 2000, and served as legislative caucus leader. Chiu represented the PFP in the 2001 Taoyuan County magisterial election amid concerns about splitting the vote between supporters of the Pan-Blue Coalition. In February 2002, Chiu left the People First Party to become an independent politician. Later that year, he joined a caucus specifically convened for independents. In June 2004, Chiu co-founded the Non-Partisan Solidarity Union. In October 2007, Chiu accepted a legislative nomination from the Democratic Progressive Party, subsequently losing the January 2008 election to Sun Ta-chien. Weeks after the election, Chiu and many other politicians were indicted on charges of bribery dating back to 2003. Prosecutors alleged that Chiu accepted NT$1 million from the Taiwan Dental Association. Upon final appeal to the Taiwan High Court, Chiu was acquitted of all charges. He was invited to the 2010 Cross-Strait Economic, Trade and Culture Forum, by which time he had joined the People United Party.
