= Choo =

Choo may refer to:

== People ==
=== Surname ===
- Alternative spelling of Chu (Korean name)
- Alternative spelling of Zhu (surname), a Chinese surname
- Spelling of Zhou (surname)
  - Henry Choo, Malaysian-born Australian opera tenor
  - Jimmy Choo (born 1961), Malaysian fashion designer now based in London

=== Given name ===
- Choo-Choo Coleman, American baseball player
- Choo Freeman (born 1979), American baseball player

== Other meanings ==
- Choo, Chinese name for the star Alpha Arae
- Choo, village in Ghana near Adibo
- Choo, character in the Japanese manga and anime series One Piece

== See also ==
- Cho (disambiguation)
- Chu (disambiguation)
- Chuu (disambiguation)
