= Choo Choo =

Choo Choo or Choo-Choo may refer to:

== Nickname ==
- Charlie Brackins (1932–1991), American football quarterback
- Charlie Brown (boxer) (born 1958), American retired boxer
- Choo-Choo Coleman (1937–2016), American retired Major League Baseball player
- Charlie Justice (halfback) (1924–2003), American College Football Hall of Fame and National Football League player
- Michael Portillo (born 1953), British journalist, broadcaster, and former Conservative Party politician and Cabinet Minister
- Gene Roberts (American football) (1923–2009), American National Football League player
- Harry Romero, American disc jockey and record producer

== Other uses ==
- Choo-Choo!, a 1932 Our Gang comedy short film
- Choo Choo Bar, an Australian candy bar
- Choo-Choo (Top Cat), a character in the animated series Top Cat
- Choo-Choo, an Animatronic Bear character in The Rock-afire Explosion music stage show
- Choo-Choo Charlie, an animated mascot for Good & Plenty candy

== See also ==
- Chattanooga Choo Choo (disambiguation)
- Steam locomotive
