= Qiú =

Qiú is the Hanyu Pinyin transliteration of the Chinese surname 仇 (Qiú) and 裘 (Qiú).

== 仇 (Qiú) ==
There are three sources for the ancestry of 仇:

1. A Xia vassal by the name of Jiuwu (九吾) established the state of Jiu (九), but it was destroyed by Di Xin during the Shang dynasty. To escape prosecution, the descendants of Jiuwu appended the 人 ("person") radical to 九 (Jiu), thus creating the surname 仇.
2. In the Spring and Autumn period, Duke Min of Song (宋湣公) was murdered by his subordinate Nangong Wan (南宮萬). The minister Zi Qiumu (子仇牧) sought revenge but was also killed by Nangong Wan. Zi Qiumu's descendants then took the first character of his name, Qiu 仇, to be their surname.
3. In Northern Wei, a Hou Luoqi (侯洛齊) of Zhongshan was adopted by the Qiu clan, and thus changed his surname from Hou to Qiu. He rose in ranks due to his military endeavours, and the Qiu clan became prosperous at the time.

Prominent people with the surname

- Qiu Deshu (仇德樹; 1948–2020), Chinese contemporary artist
- Qiu He (仇和; born 1957), Chinese former politician
- Qiu Luan (仇鸾; 1505–1552), Ming Dynasty general
- Min Qiu (仇旻), Chinese scientist and engineer
- Qiu Qiongying (仇瓊英), fictional character in Water Margin, one of the Four Great Classical Novels
- Qiu Shiliang (仇士良; 781–843), Tang Dynasty eunuch official
- Qiu Xiaofei (仇晓飞; born 1977), Chinese contemporary artist
- Qiu Ying (仇英; 1494–1552), Ming Dynasty painter
- Qiu Zhaobie (仇兆鳌; 1638–1717), Ming-Qing scholar
- Qiu Zhu (仇珠; fl. 1565–1585), Ming Dynasty painter and artist
- Chow Chee Keong (仇志强; 1948–2018), Malaysian professional footballer
- Robin Shou (仇云波; born 1960), Hong Kong-American actor and martial artist
- Qiu Zhanxuan, Chinese student activist and Marxist

== 裘 (Qiú) ==
Prominent people with the surname

- Qiu Fazu (裘法祖; 1914–2008), Chinese surgeon and politician
- Qiu Xiaojun (裘晓君; born 1990), Chinese professional boxer
- Qiu Xiaolong (裘小龙; born 1953), Chinese American author
- Qiu Xigui (裘锡圭; 1935–2025), Chinese historian, palaeographer, professor
- Qiu Yufang (裘毓芳; 1871–1904), Chinese journalist and feminist, the first female journalist in China
- Donna Chiu (裘海正; born 1965), Taiwanese singer and former television host
- Chiu Jeng-jiann (裘正健), Taiwanese politician

== See also ==
- Chinese name
- Qiū (surname) (丘, 邱 and 秋)
- Khoo - the surname Qiu, pronounced in Fujian dialect
- Chiu - romanized version of Qiu
- Khuu - In Vietnam, this surname is written in Quoc Ngu
