= David Chu =

David Chu may refer to:

- David Chu (designer), founder of Nautica, a men's designer outerwear company
- David S. C. Chu (born 1944), former U.S. Under Secretary of Defense for Personnel and Readiness
- David Chu (Hong Kong politician) (born 1944), member of the Legislative Council of Hong Kong and the National People's Congress of the People's Republic of China

== See also ==
- David Chiu (disambiguation)
