= Tom Chiu =

American musician (born 1971)

Tom Chiu (邱崇德) is a violinist and composer of Taiwanese origin working and living in Brooklyn, New York. He is the founder of the FLUX Quartet, who are widely recognized for their performances of technically challenging cutting-edge compositions, including Morton Feldman's six-hour marathon String Quartet No. 2.

Chiu has performed over 100 premieres worldwide and has worked closely with many distinguished composers including Muhal Richard Abrams, David First, Leroy Jenkins, Wadada Leo Smith, Alvin Lucier, Michael Schumacher, Henry Threadgill, Virko Baley, Dean Drummond, and Oliver Lake, among others. He avidly pursues collaborations with unconventional artists whose work he admires, including balloon virtuoso Judy Dunaway, avant choreographer Eun-Me Ahn, puppeteer Basil Twist, and drone pioneer/guitarist David First. He has also worked closely with Ornette Coleman, with whom he appeared at the 2000 Bell Atlantic Jazz Festival.

Tom's discography includes recordings for the Asphodel, Cambria, Chesky Records, Koch, Mode, Sombient, and Tzadik labels. His original works as composer/improvisor have been performed in numerous countries, including Mongolia and Uzbekistan. Having also composed for motion pictures, his first soundtrack for the short film Boris (written and directed by Francesca Galesi won the top prize at the NY Expo Festival of Shorts. Chiu holds degrees in music and chemistry from Juilliard and Yale.

Chiu made a childhood appearance with Tom Hanks in The Man With One Red Shoe as the character "Dickie".

== See also ==
- Official Site of FLUX Quartet
- New York Times: Violin Taken in Subway Is Reunited With Owner
