= Chu Chu =

Chu Chu, ChuChu, or Chu-Chu can refer to the following things:

- ChuChu (The Legend of Zelda), a type of monster from The Legend of Zelda video game series
- Chu-Chu, a character from Xenogears
- A type of mouse from ChuChu Rocket!
- Chu-Chu, a monkey-like mascot figure from the anime Revolutionary Girl Utena
- ChuChu (magazine), a Japanese shōjo manga magazine published by Shogakukan
- ChuChu, a character from the Kirby video game series
- Ch'uch'u, also spelled Chuchu, a mountain in Bolivia
- Chuchu, a pikachu kept by Yellow in Pokémon Adventures
- Chayote, a vegetable known in Brazil as chuchu
- ChuChu TV, a popular channel on YouTube for children
- Jim Chuchu, a Kenyan film director, photographer, singer-songwriter and visual artist
- CHU2 (pronounced "Chuchu"), the stage name of Chiyu Tamade, a fictional character from BanG Dream!
