= List of universities and colleges in Taipei =

The following universities and colleges are located in Taipei, Taiwan.

== Universities ==
- China University of Science and Technology
- China University of Technology
- Chinese Culture University
- Ming Chuan University
- National Chengchi University
- National Taiwan Normal University
- National Taipei University
- National Taiwan University
- National Taipei University of Business
- National Taipei University of Education
- National Taipei University of Nursing and Health Science
- National Taipei University of Technology
- National Taiwan University of Science and Technology
- National Yang Ming Chiao Tung University
- Shih Chien University
- Shih Hsin University
- Soochow University
- Taipei City University of Science and Technology
- Taipei Medical University
- Taipei National University of the Arts
- Takming University of Science and Technology
- Tatung University
- University of Taipei

== Chinese language schools ==
Major Chinese language schools:

- International Chinese Language Institute for foreigners (TMI), at Taiwan Manadarin Institute
- International Chinese Language Program (ICLP), formerly Stanford Center and Inter-University Center (IUP), at National Taiwan University
- Center for Chinese Language and Cultural Studies (CCLC), formerly Mandarin Training Center (MTC), at National Taiwan Normal University

== See also ==
- Education in Taiwan
- List of universities in Taiwan
- List of schools in Taipei
