= Taipei Main Public Library =

Public library in Taipei

Taipei City Main Public Library
- 臺北市立圖書館
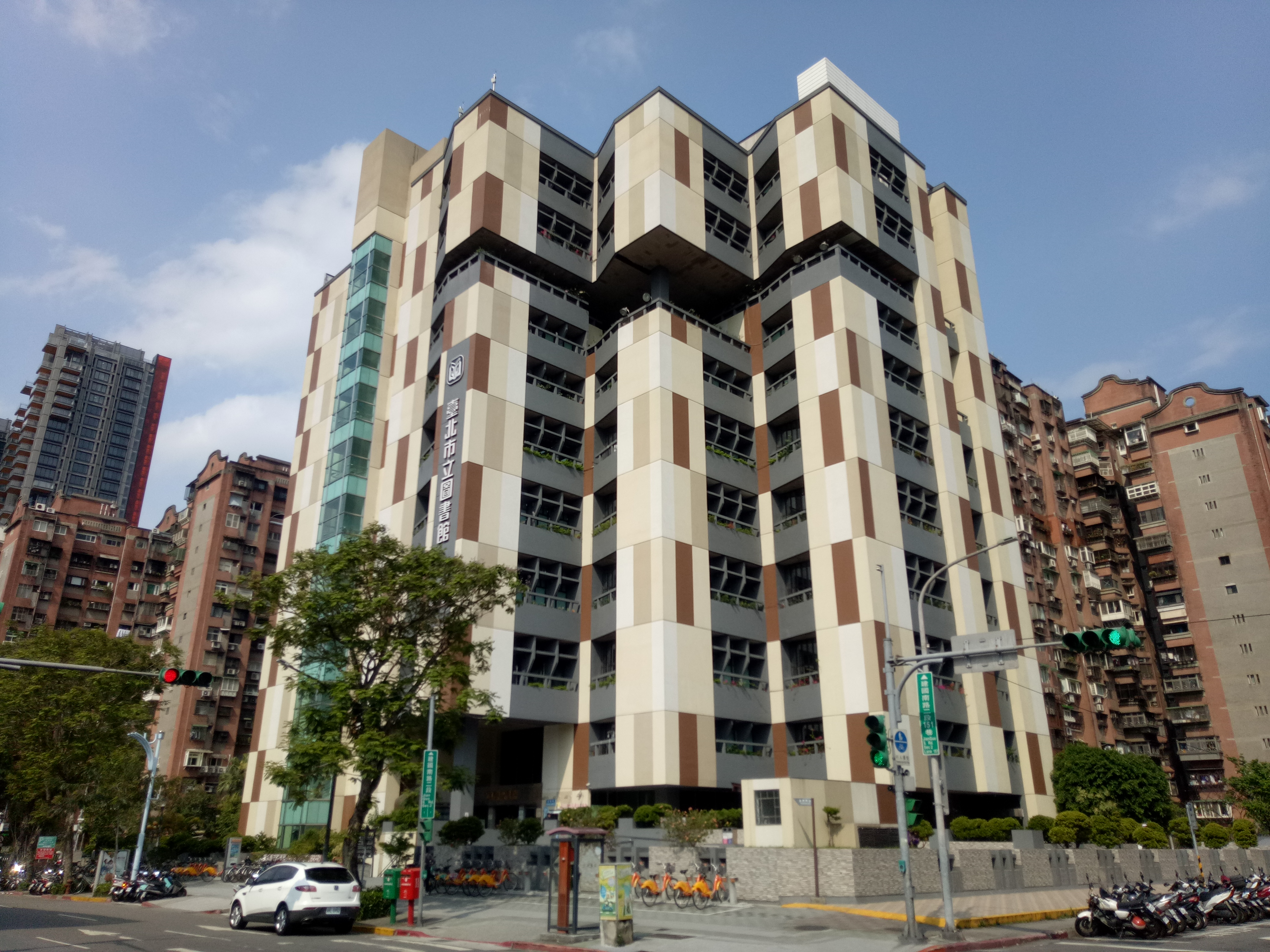
- 25°01′45″N 121°32′10″E
- Location: No. 125, Sec. 2, Jianguo S. Rd., Da'an District, Taipei City, Taiwan 10659
- Established: 1952; 1990 (current main library)
- Branches: 44 branches, 12 neighborhood reading rooms, 8 intelligent libraries, and 10 FastBook

Other information
- Director: Shi-chang Hong
- Employees: 574
- Website: tpml.gov.taipei/

The Taipei Main Public Library (Chinese: 臺北市立圖書館; pinyin: Táiběi Shìlì Túshūguǎn) is the central library of Taipei City, Taiwan. It is the main library of the Taipei Public Library System. The building is located in Jianguo South Road, Da'an District, near the Daan Forest Park.

== Floor plan ==
| Floors | Use |
|---|---|
| 11 | Taipei Active Learning Demonstration Center for Senior Citizens, Training Room |
| 10 | Conference Room, Meeting Room, Library Archives Room |
| 9 | Multicultural Information Center, Computer Lab |
| 8 | Audio-visual Room |
| 7 | Administration Center |
| 6 | Study Area, Bound Newspaper Area |
| 5 | Reading Room, Chinese Book Collections (Category 0-6), Spotlight of Shanghai/Reading Beijing, Public Library Northern Region Resource Center |
| 4 | Reading Room, Journals, Chinese Book Collections (Category 7-9), Foreign Language Book Collections, Acquisition & Cataloging Section, Taipei City Government Publications |
| 3 | Reference Rooms, Reference Services Section, American Corner, Information Center on Study Abroad |
| 2 | Periodicals Room |
| 1 | Information, E-Learning Center, Circulation & Preservation Section, Extension Section |
| B1 | Children's Library, Gallery, Wu Ta-You Study Room, Breastfeeding Room |
| B2 | The Small World (Children's Foreign Library), Lecture Hall |
| B3 | Parking Lot |

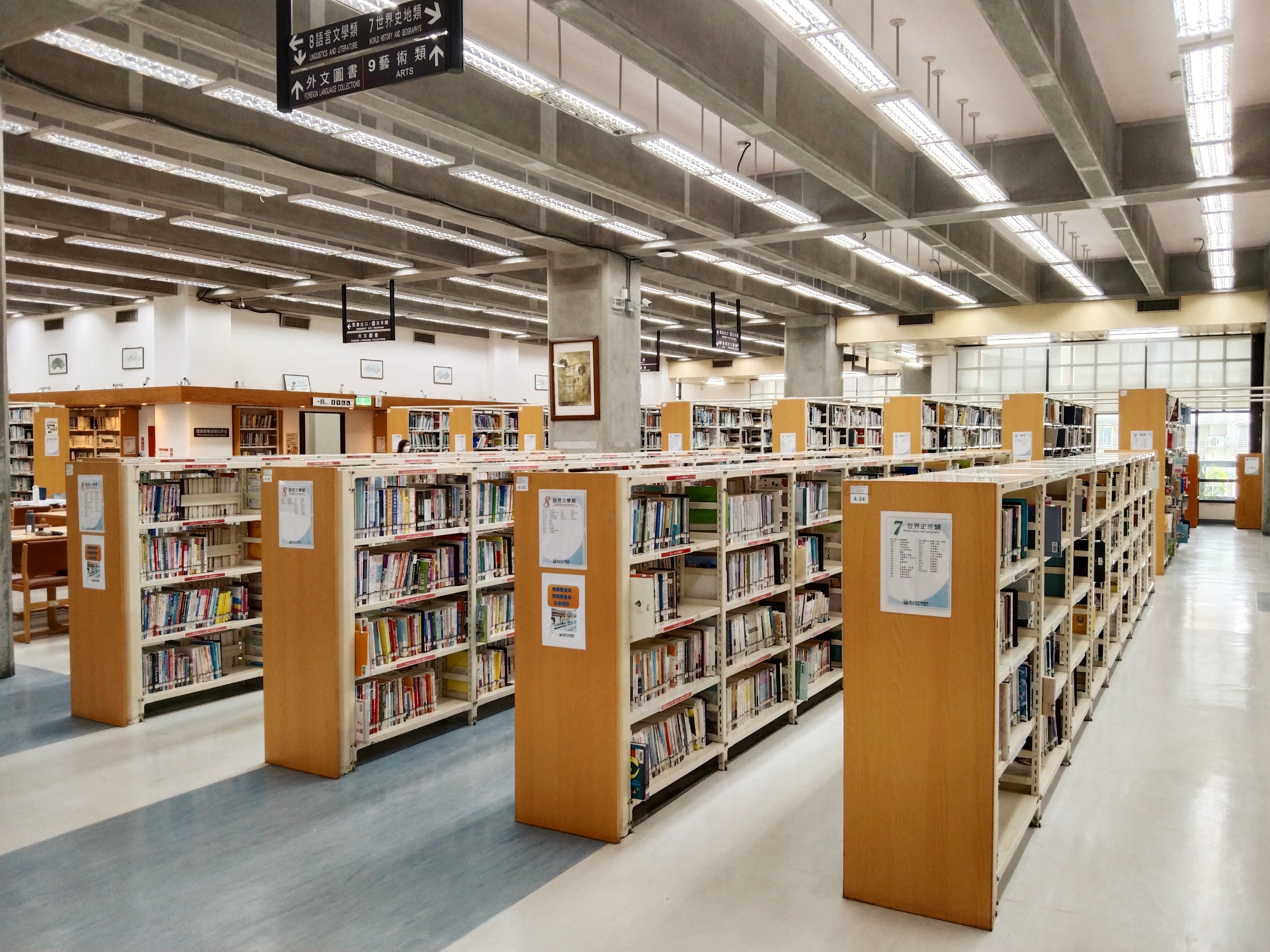
Book Collections Area (4F)

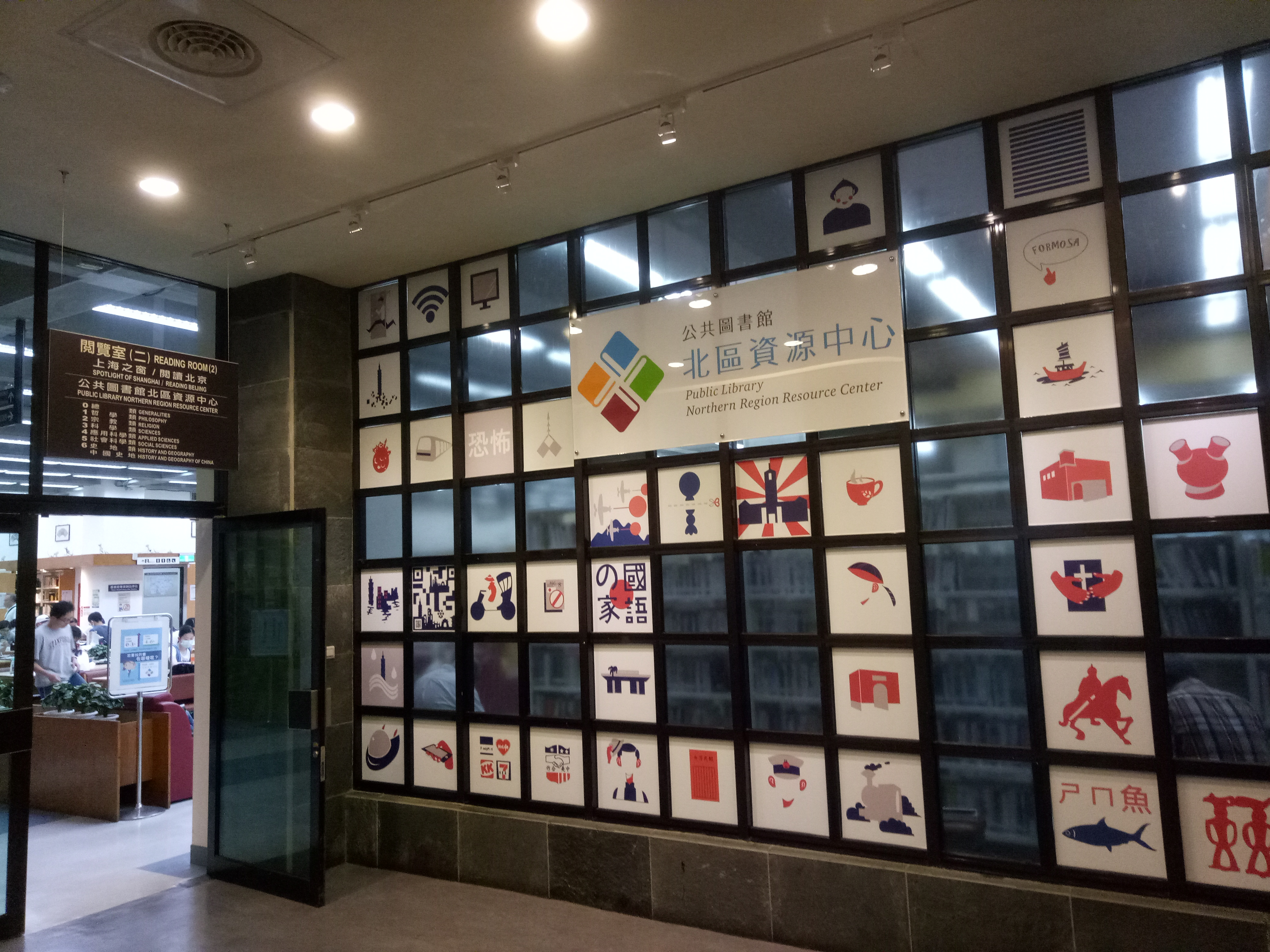
Public Library Northern Region Resource Center (5F)

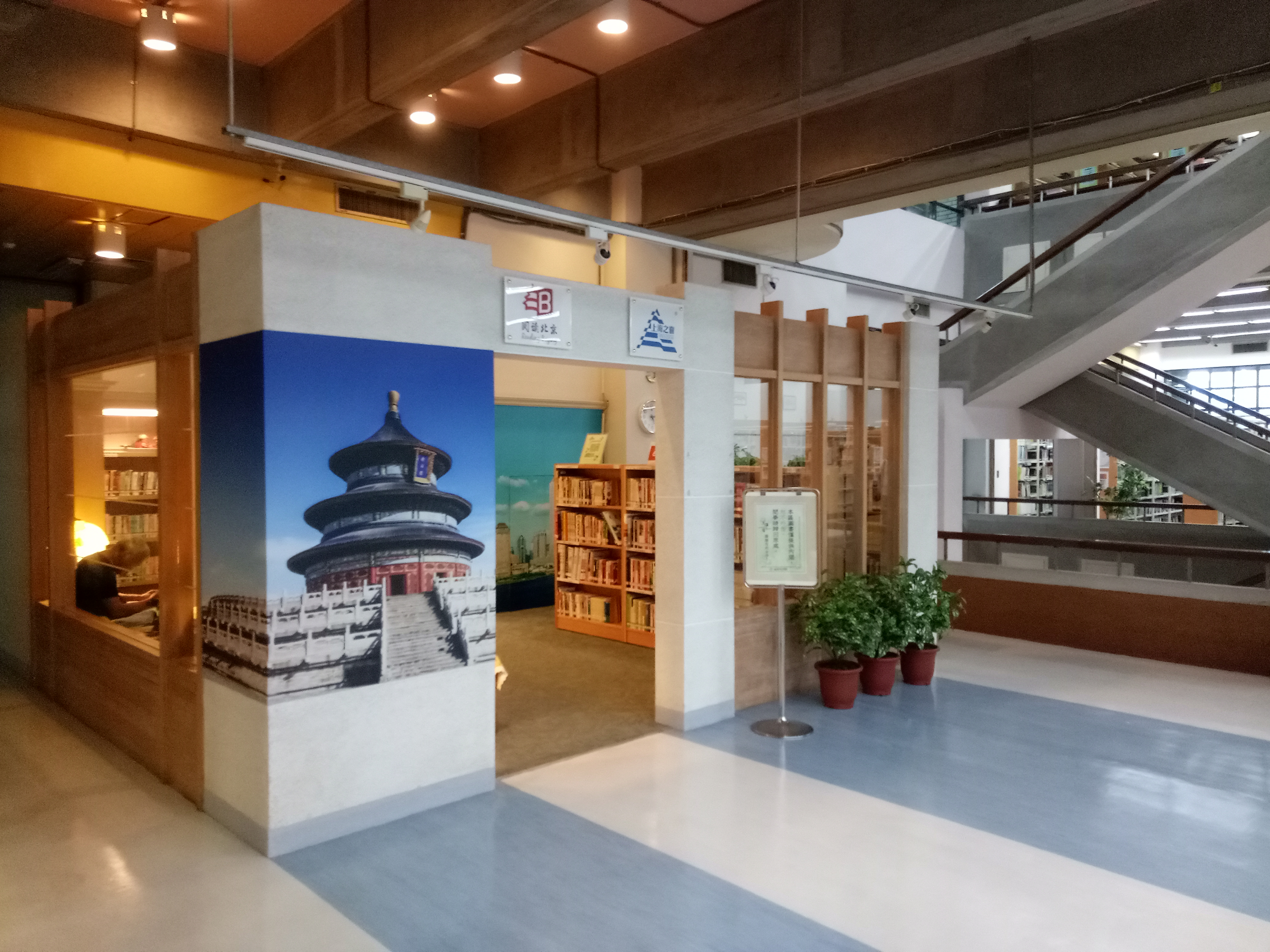
"Spotlight of Shanghai/Reading Beijing" (5F)

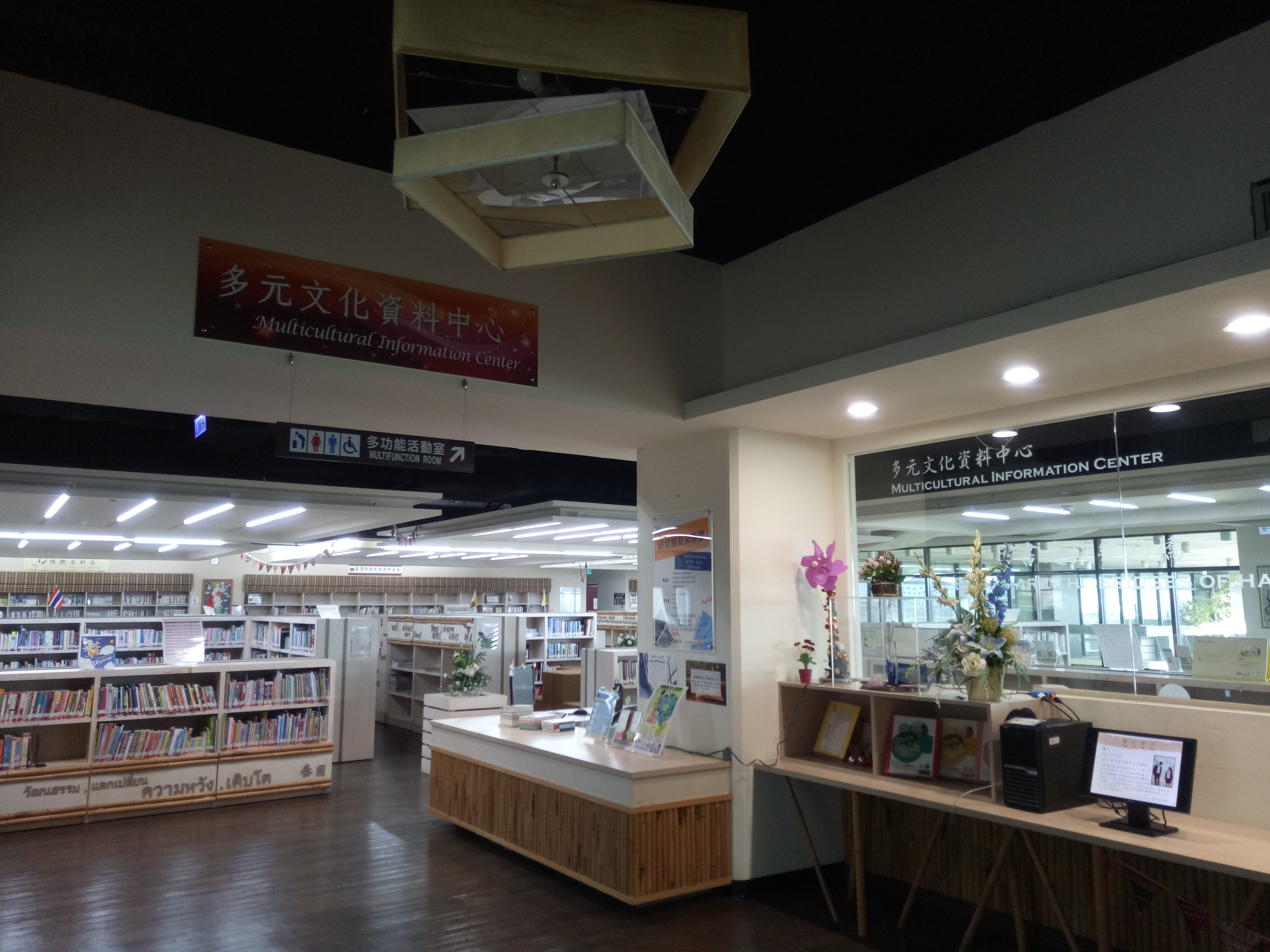
Multicultural Information Center (9F)

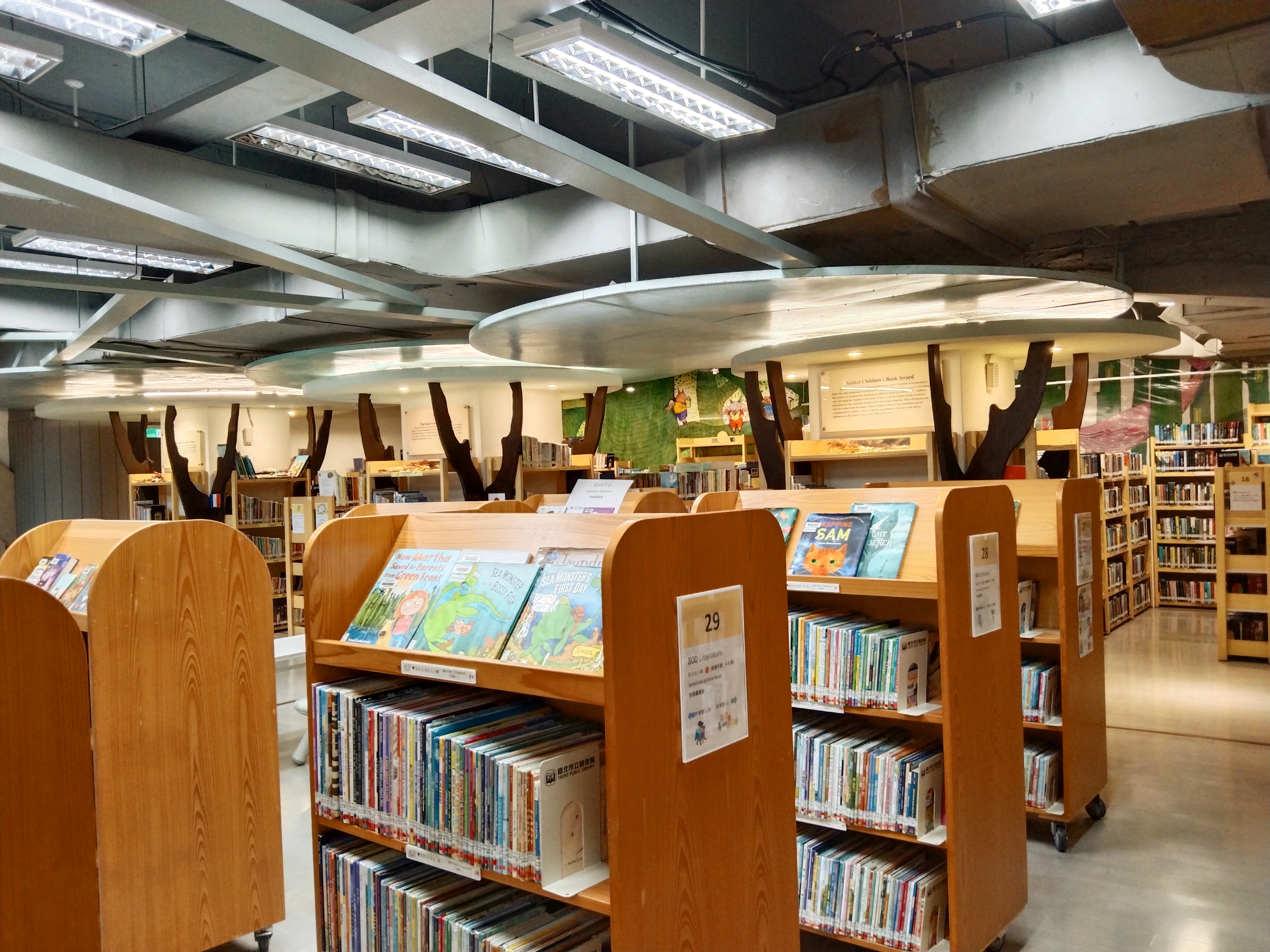
The Small World (Children's Foreign Library)

== Organization ==
- Director
- Deputy Director
- Chief Secretary
- Acquisition and Cataloging Section
- Circulation & Preservation Section
- Reference Services Section
- Extension Section
- Audiovisual Section
- Systems Administration Office
- Administration Office
- Personnel Office
- Accounting Office
- Government Ethics Office
