= Chew Jun Ru =

Singaporean musician

Chew Jun Ru (Chinese: 周俊如) is a Singaporean musician known for his contributions to the country's erhu scene. In 2013, he became the first graduate of the Royal College of Music (RCM) to play a Chinese traditional instrument.

== Early life and family ==
In his early life, Chew was already an avid player of the erhu. He attended Rosyth Primary School, Nanyang Junior College and the Nanyang Academy of Fine Arts. Born to a working-class family of four children (Chew being the eldest), his father Sin Hwa is a business person and founder of ICO Music and Culture Consultancy while his mother is a homemaker.

== Career ==
Pursuing his interest in the erhu, Chew applied to study at the Singapore Nanyang Academy of Fine Arts (NAFA) validated by the London-based Royal College of Music (RCM) in collaboration with the Central Conservatory of Music in Beijing, China. He managed to take up erhu as an instrument, despite RCM not having a Chinese traditional instrument department. Graduating in August 2013 at his alma mater (NAFA), he became the "first graduate [of RCM] specialising in a Chinese traditional instrument".
