= CIU =

CIU may refer to:

- Crash Investigation Unit, an Australian factual television program
- Working Men's Club and Institute Union, an association of social clubs in the United Kingdom
- Chippewa County International Airport in Sault Ste. Marie, Michigan (IATA Code: CIU)
- Columbia International University, a Bible college and seminary in Columbia, South Carolina
- Cyprus International University, Cyprus, North Cyprus
- Cape plc, a construction company listed in the Alternative Investment Market under ticker CIU
- Customs and Immigration Union (Canada)
- Chronic idiopathic urticaria, also known as hives
- Collective investment undertaking, another term for an investment fund
- Conviction Integrity Unit, a division of a prosecutorial office, working to prevent, identify, and remedy false convictions
- Cédula de Identidad de Uruguay, the Uruguayan identity card
- Convergència i Unió, a Catalan political party
