= Geoffrey Chew (musicologist) =

British musicologist

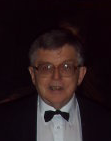
Geoffrey Chew in January 2010

Geoffrey Chew (/tʃuː/) is a British musicologist. He was born and grew up in East London, South Africa, but has lived in Britain most of his life. After being educated in South Africa as a child, he studied music in England at the Royal College of Music, University of Cambridge and subsequently studied for his doctorate at the University of Manchester where he was supervised by Hans Redlich. He has since lectured in music at the University of Aberdeen, Royal Holloway, University of London (where he continues to lecture as Emeritus Professor) and more recently the Masaryk University, in Brno, Czech Republic.

He has published on a wide variety of topics from the Middle Ages to contemporary music and also on music theory, but his principal research interests are in Czech and Slovak music (especially Leoš Janáček), relationships between literature and music, music analysis and reception history.
