= Choo Min-yeol =

South Korean footballer (born 1999)

Personal information
- Full name: Choo Min-yeol
- Date of birth: 10 January 1999 (age 27)
- Place of birth: South Korea
- Height: 1.75 m (5 ft 9 in)
- Position: Forward

Team information
- Current team: Bucheon 1995
- Number: 15

Youth career
- –2016: Rayo Vallecano
- 2016–2017: Bucheon 1995

Senior career*
Years	Team	Apps	(Gls)
2018–	Bucheon 1995	5	(0)
- * Club domestic league appearances and goals as of November 15, 2019 ‡ National team caps and goals as of November 3, 2018

- Choo Min-yeol
- Hangul: 추민열
- RR: Chu Minyeol
- MR: Ch'u Minyŏl

Choo Min-yeol (Korean: 추민열; born 10 January 1999) is a South Korean football forward who plays for Bucheon 1995.
