= Joo Jiwan =

South Korean craft artist (born 1965)

- Born: December 25, 1965; Seoul, South Korea
- Education: Ewha Womans University
- Known for: Craft
- Notable work: Cardboard Room; Labyrinth as Puzzle; Sand Labyrinth; Outside Gallery; Finding the Way Out from the Labyrinth; Wishing for the Future; Invitation to Jade Green; Optical Illusion

Joo Jiwan (Korean: 주지완; born December 25, 1965) is a South Korean craft artist.

== Biography ==
In the 1990s, she earned both her bachelor's and master's degrees from the College of Fine Arts at Ewha Womans University and later taught at the university level. From 2004 to 2006, she worked as a visiting artist at Virginia Commonwealth University. As an artist active in both South Korea and the United States, she initially focused on ceramic works but gradually expanded her practice to include various materials and media. To date, she has held five solo exhibitions, all of which, except for the first, were held in the United States.

== Solo Exhibition ==
- 2016. The 5th Solo Exhibition “Cardboard Room” (NoHo Gallery, New York, NY, U.S)
- 2011. The 4th Solo Exhibition "Labyrinth as Puzzle" (NoHo Gallery, New York, NY, U.S)
- 2009. The 3rd Solo Exhibition "Sand Labyrinth" (Quirk Gallery. Richmond, VA, U.S)
- 2006. The 2nd Solo Exhibition "Finding the Way Out from the Labyrinth" (Gallery Art 6, Richmond, VA, U.S)
- 2001. The 1st Solo Exhibition "Invitation to The Jade Color" (Gana Art Space, Seoul, Korea)

== Authored books ==
- Joo, Jiwan (May 20, 2014). 뉴욕의 축제 (in Korean). Seoul: 문학세계사. ISBN 978-89-7075-582-3.
- Joo, Jiwan (March 21, 2011). 뉴욕의 현대미술 이야기 (in Korean). Seoul: 문학세계사. ISBN 978-89-7075-509-0.
