= Chattanooga Choo Choo (disambiguation) =

"Chattanooga Choo Choo" is a 1941 song.

Chattanooga Choo Choo may also refer to:

- Chattanooga Choo Choo (film), a 1984 comedy starring Barbara Eden and George Kennedy
- Chattanooga Choo-Choos, a minor league Negro league baseball team based in Chattanooga, Tennessee from 1940 to 1946
- Chattanooga Choo-Choo Hotel, formerly Terminal Station
