= Joo Yea-na =

South Korean volleyball player (born 1990)

Personal information
- Nationality: South Korean
- Born: 5 February 1990 (age 36)
- Height: 175 cm (5 ft 9 in)
- Weight: 61 kg (134 lb)
- Spike: 289 cm (114 in)
- Block: 280 cm (110 in)

Career
Years	Teams
2011	Heungkuk life Insurance

National team
2011	South Korea

Joo Yea-na (born 5 February 1990) is a South Korean female professional volleyball player.

She was part of the team at the Asian Women's U19 Volleyball Championship, and 2011 FIVB Volleyball Women's World Cup.

== Clubs ==
- Heungkuk life Insurance (2011)

== Honors ==
- Best Setter: 2008 Asian Junior Women's Volleyball Championship
