= Chewa =

Chewa may refer to:

- the Chewa people
- the Chewa language
