= James J. Chou =

American chemist

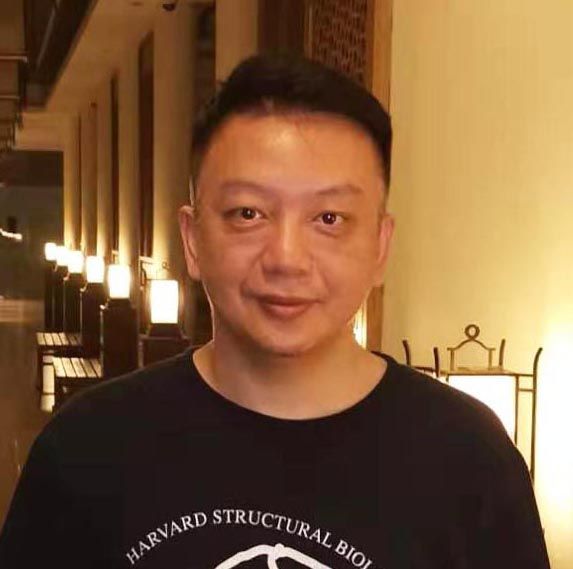
- James J. Chou in 2019
- Born: August 26, 1970 (age 56); Shanghai, China

James J. Chou (周界文) is a Chinese American scientist and Professor of Biological Chemistry and Molecular Pharmacology at the Harvard Medical School. He is known for his use of Nuclear Magnetic Resonance (NMR) Spectroscopy to reveal the structural details of the membrane regions (transmembrane and membrane-proximal) of cell surface proteins, particularly those of immune receptors and viral membrane proteins.

== Biography ==
James J. Chou was born in Shanghai, China, and immigrated to the United States to join his parents in 1984. He obtained his B.S. in physics from University of Michigan at Ann Arbor. He then received Ph.D. in Biophysics from the Harvard University, where he studied protein NMR spectroscopy under the supervision of Gerhard Wagner. Dr. Chou furthered his training in NMR by doing a postdoctoral fellowship in the lab of Adriaan Bax at the US National Institutes of Health. Dr. Chou joined the faculty at Harvard Medical School in 2003 and moved up the rank to tenured full professor in 2012.

== Scientific contributions ==
As a graduate student in Gerhard Wagner’s Lab at Harvard Medical School, he investigated the solution structures and mechanism of proteins involved in programmed cell death including the CARD (caspase recruitment domain) and the BID.

In his postdoctoral study with Adriaan Bax, Dr. Chou applied NMR residual dipolar coupling (RDC) methods to reveal the conformational dynamics of the EF-hands of the calcium binding protein Calmodulin. He also combined the RDC application and bicelles to investigate small membrane protein domains in near lipid bilayer environment.

As an independent investigator, Dr. Chou continued NMR studies of membrane proteins to fill the knowledge gap in the transmembrane and membrane-proximal regions of several immune receptors and viral membrane proteins. The membrane regions of cell surface proteins are difficult targets for X-ray crystallography because they are generally very hydrophobic and often dynamic; they are also too small for the state-of-the-art cryogenic electron microscopy. The NMR-based protocols pioneered by Dr. Chou constitute a general means of revealing these “blind spots” in structural biology. Using these methods, Chou made several unexpected discoveries such as the critical roles of the membrane regions in immune receptor clustering and activation and in viral membrane fusion protein assembly. In addition to the above major scientific contributions, some of his earlier significant discoveries include structure and mechanism of viral ion channels and dynamic nature of membrane channels and carriers.

== Awards and Fellowships ==
- Harvard Biophysics Fellowship (1994–1996).
- NIH IRTA Postdoctoral Fellowship (1999–2001).
- Glaxo-Smith Life Science Fellow (2003–2005).
- The Smith Family New Investigator Award (2005).
- The Alexander and Margaret Stewart Trust Award (2005).
- PEW Scholar in the Biomedical Sciences (2005).
- Giovanni Armenise-Harvard Junior Faculty Award (2006).
- Genzyme Outstanding Achievement in Biomedical Science Award (2009).
