= Zhou Yi =

Zhou Yi may refer to:

- The I Ching, also known as Zhouyi, one of the oldest of the Chinese classic texts
- Zhou Yi (musician), Shanghai born and New York-based Chinese pipa virtuoso
- Zhou Yi (softball) (born 1983), female Chinese softball player who competed at the 2004 Summer Olympics
- Zhou Yi (tennis) (born 2005), Chinese tennis player
- Yi Zhou (born 1978), Chinese film director
- Zhou Yi (Jin dynasty), Chinese Jin dynasty official
