= Min Qiu =

Ming Qiu
- 仇旻
- Born: Hangzhou, Zhejiang, China
- Education: Zhejiang University (Ph.D. degree in Physics) Royal Institute of Technology (Ph.D. degree in Electromagnetics)
- Scientific career
- Workplaces: Royal Institute of Technology Zhejiang University Westlake University

Min Qiu (Chinese: 仇旻) from Zhejiang University, Zhejiang, China, was named a Fellow of the Institute of Electrical and Electronics Engineers (IEEE) in 2016 for his contributions to nanophotonic devices.
