= Ju Hyeong-kwang =

South Korean baseball player and coach

KT Wiz – No. 76
- Pitcher
- Born: March 1, 1976 (age 50); South Korea
- Batted: Left Threw: Left

KBO debut
- 1994, for the Lotte Giants

Last KBO appearance
- 2007, for the Lotte Giants

KBO statistics
- Win–loss record: 87-82
- Earned run average: 3.83
- Strikeouts: 1,209

Teams
- As player: Lotte Giants (1994–2007); As coach: Lotte Giants pitching coach (2019–present)

Career highlights and awards
- KBO: Strikeout leader (1996)

- Ju Hyeong-kwang
- Hangul: 주형광
- RR: Ju Hyeonggwang
- MR: Chu Hyŏnggwang

Ju Hyeong-kwang (Korean: 주형광; born March 1, 1976) is a South Korean baseball coach and former professional baseball pitcher. He played 14 seasons in the KBO League, all for the Lotte Giants. Ju was one of the better starting pitchers of the latter half of the 1990s, winning at least ten games in a season five times in six years. He struck out 221 batters in the 1996 season, second all-time in the KBO. Ju pitched in two Korean Series for the Giants, in 1995 and 1999, with his team coming up short both times. Ju threw and batted left-handed.

Ju joined the Giants in 1994 at age 18, immediately making an impact as a starting pitcher, going 11-5 with a 3.04 ERA and 142 strikeouts. After a similarly strong season in 1995 (10-7, 3.05 ERA and 152 strikeouts), Ju really broke out in 1996, tying for the league lead with 18 victories to go with a league-leading 221 strikeouts. Ju had a down season in 1997, but came back strong in 1998 and 1999, coming in third in the league in strikeouts in '98 with 177.

After a mediocre 2000 campaign, Ju was felled by injuries for most of the next two seasons. From 2003 until his final season, 2007, Ju swung between starting and the bullpen. He retired after the 2007 season, at age 31.

Ju is currently the pitching coach of his long-time team the Lotte Giants.

== See also ==
- List of KBO career strikeout leaders
