= Choo Byung-jik =

South Korean politician

- Hangul: 추병직
- Hanja: 秋秉直
- RR: Chu Byeongjik
- MR: Ch'u Pyŏngjik

Choo Byung-jik (Korean: 추병직) was a South Korean politician. He was the 13th Minister for Construction.

== Kazakh construction agreement ==
Minister Byung-jik announced on 25 September 2006 that the governments of South Korea and Kazakhstan, represented by Byung-jik and his Kazakh counterpart, agreed to increase cooperation in construction by having South Korean construction companies build roads, railways, airports and ports. According to a statement released by the South Korean Ministry, the Nazarbayev administration plans to build 4,000 kilometers of railways and 8,000 km of highways by 2015 to expand transportation infrastructure for the Caspian Sea field.

== South Korea-Libya relations ==
The fourth session of the Libya-Korea mixed cooperation commission, co-chaired by Byung-jik and Ali Zikri, Secretary of the Libyan People's General Committee for communications and transport, was held on 21 September 2006. According to Angola Press, "Zikri promoted joint investments, transfer of technology, increase in trade and training, human resources development, tourism, health and energy." Zikri hinted that the Government of Libya wanted Korean investment in transportation and sanitation infrastructure development. Byung-jik expressed the South Korean government's willingness to increase investment in development projects, and cited the creation of an artificial river as evidence of past cooperation between the two nations. The ministers agreed to establish an economic, investment and tourism commission, and a construction, energy, training, transport, oil and electricity commission, to decide how cooperation, specifically South Korean investment, would benefit Libya and South Korea. Byung-jik accompanied South Korean Prime Minister Han Myeong Sook and the vice-ministers of foreign affairs, industry, information and communications, when they arrived in Tripoli on 20 September for an official visit. Libyan Prime Minister Baghdadi Mahmoudi hosted a dinner for the South Korean delegation.
