= Chew Gek Khim =

Singaporean businesswoman and investor

- Born: 1961 (age 63–64); Singapore
- Occupation: Businesswoman
- Known for: Straits Trading Company
- Relatives: Tan Chin Tuan (grandfather)

Chew Gek Khim (Chinese: 周玉琴; pinyin: Zhōu Yùqín) is a Singaporean businesswoman and investor who is the chairperson of companies including the Straits Trading Company. She is the granddaughter of former OCBC Bank chairman Tan Chin Tuan. According to Forbes, she is part of one of the richest families in Singapore with a net worth of $1.4 billion. Chew was voted Singapore's Businessperson of the Year in 2014 and 2015.

== Biography ==
Chew was born in Singapore in 1961 and grew up alongside her grandfather Tan Chin Tuan. She studied at the National University of Singapore and graduated with a bachelor's degree in law before joining law firm Drew & Napier, where she specialized in corporate law.

After practicing for three years, she left to join her family's investment group, Tecity. Chew eventually became the executive chairman of Tecity and oversaw the company's eventual takeover of Straits Trading in 2008.

After purchasing Straits Trading, Chew went about making changes to its mining operations by focusing on the production of tin and by diversifying its interests to expand into real estate and hospitality.
