= Chunghi Choo =

South Korean jeweler (born 1938)

- Education: University of Iowa
- Known for: Metalsmith and Jewelry Designer

Chunghi Choo (born 1938) is a jewelry designer and metalsmith who was born in Incheon, Korea in 1938. She received a BFA degree from Ewha Womans University in Seoul, Korea, where she majored in Oriental painting and studied philosophy of Oriental art and Chinese brush calligraphy. She moved to the United States in 1961 to study metalsmithing, weaving, and ceramics at Cranbrook Academy of Art in Bloomfield Hills, Michigan, where she received an MFA in 1965.

She taught jewelry and metal arts at the University of Iowa School of Art and Art History from 1968 to 2015 and is currently Professor Emeritus.

Her works have been exhibited worldwide and are found in the permanent collections of the Victoria & Albert Museum, London; Musée des Arts décoratifs, Paris; the Philadelphia Museum of Art, the Museum fur Kunsthandwerk, Frankfurt, Germany; the Danish Museum of Art & Design, Copenhagen; the Metropolitan Museum of Art, Museum of Modern Art and Museum of Arts and Design, New York; Art Institute of Chicago; and The Museum of Fine Arts, Houston, among others. Her work, Blooming Vessel, was acquired by the Smithsonian American Art Museum as part of the Renwick Gallery's 50th Anniversary Campaign.

== Early life ==
Chunghi Choo was born on May 23, 1938, to a rather affluent family that was also one of South Korea's most prominent. Despite growing up in the era of Japan's occupation of Korea, Chunghi Choo's family remained in relative safety after relocating from Busan. She was 12 years old when the Korean War began and 15 when it ended. Choo's paternal grandfather, Myung Kee Choo, managed a business that exported rice to Japan and assisted the Commerce and Industry Department in Incheon. Her father, Kwang Hyun Choo, was a lover of art and music. He married Young Bong Choo (Chunghi Choo's biological mother) and had three children. After her mother died, Chunghi Choo's father remarried and had five more children. All immersed in classical music and art, Chunghi Choo felt that creating art herself was a form of expression that suited her well.

Chunghi Choo's early education played a great role in shaping her art practice and worldview. She attended Ewha Girls' High School after her family moved to Seoul permanently. She later attended Ewha Womans University in Seoul starting in 1957. Her studies of philosophy and aesthetics greatly contributed to her work and eye for art.

Deciding to leave South Korea behind to further her education and introduce her to American art, Chunghi Choo attended both the Penland School of Handicrafts and the Cranbrook Academy of Art. Choo was a resident at Penland for only two short months, but she formed strong relationships with her mentors and even the founding director of Penland, Lucy Morgan. Choo went on with Morgan and worked together to fundraise for their departments and facilities. Choo also became known for her cullinary skills, which she still highly values today.

== Career ==
Choo was a resident at Penland for only two short months, but she formed strong relationships with her mentors and even the founding director of Penland, Lucy Morgan. Choo went on with Morgan and worked together to fundraise for their departments and facilities. Choo also became known for her cullinary skills, which she still highly values today. Upon Chunghi Choo's arrival at the Cranbrook Academy of Art, she majored in metalsmithing and minored in ceramics. On the side, she was also mentored in weaving by Glen Kaufman.

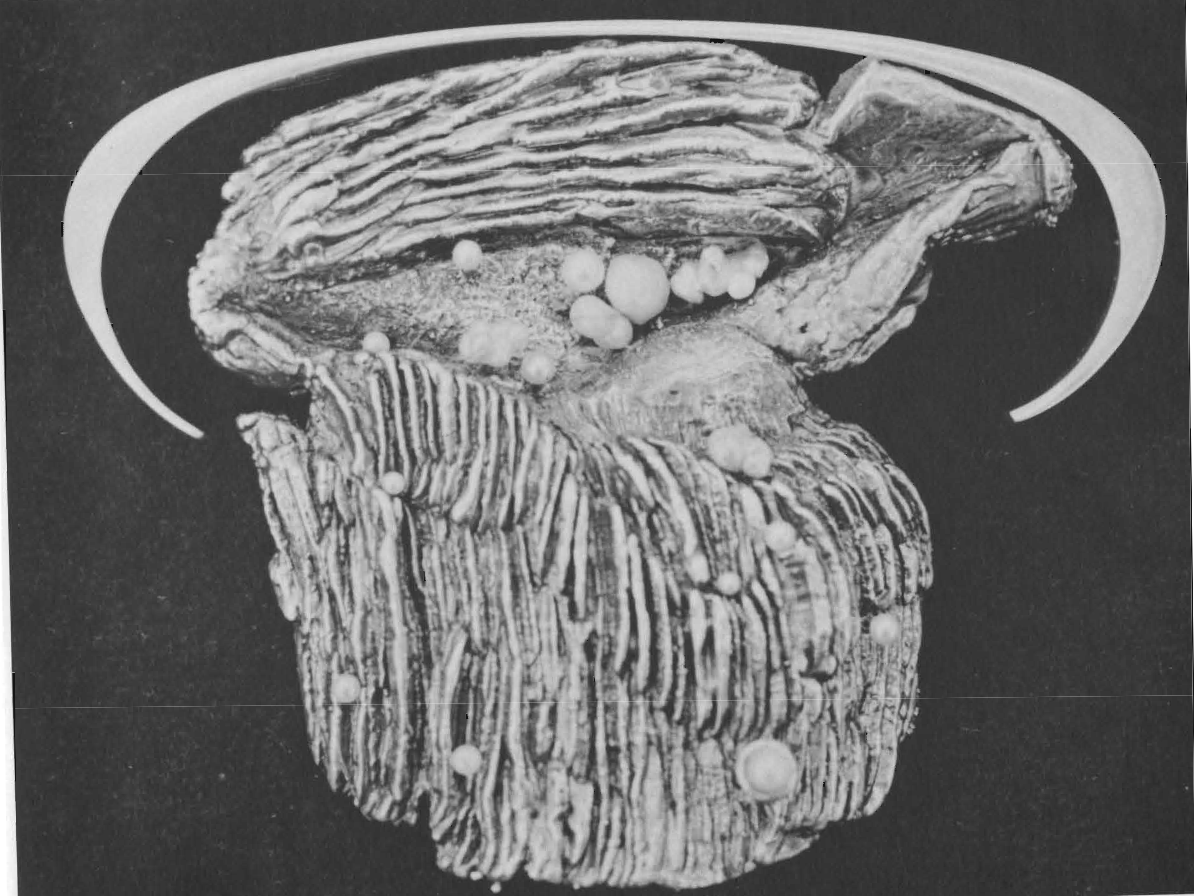
A metalwork pin by Chunghi Choo, before 1976

During the 1960s and 70s, Choo created monumental tie-dyed silks using a traditional technique called tritik. Her textile works were exhibited in the "Young Americans 1969" exhibition at what was then the Museum of Contemporary Crafts, now known as the Museum of Arts and Design in New York City. Choo is also well recognized for her work in metal, most notably her silver and copper vessels made using raising and forging techniques. Her desire to achieve fluid, organic shapes in metal caused her to study electroforming processes with Stanley Lechtzin at Tyler School of Art in 1971. Since that time many of her metal vessels are made using that technique, which allows her to work with metal in a more fluid appearance.

== Relationships ==
=== Mentors ===
- No Soo Park and Song Bong Lee
- Richard Thomas
- Maija Grotell
- Glen Kaufman
- Loja Saarinen

=== Students ===
- Mary Merkel-Hess
- Meiing Hsu
- Lois Jeckli
