= Imagine H2O =

Startup accelerator

- Type: 501(c)(3) non-profit organization
- Industry: Water technology
- Founded: 2008
- Headquarters: San Francisco, California
- Key people: Tamin Pechet, Brian Matthay, Scott Bryan
- Revenue: 4,310,257 United States dollar (2022)
- Total assets: 3,225,436 United States dollar (2022)
- Website: www.imagineh2o.org

Imagine H2O is an international startup accelerator founded in 2008. It is a 501(c)(3) non-profit organization. Imagine H2O provides early stage water startups with mentorship and introductions to investors, strategic partners, and end-users. As a nonprofit, the organization does not take equity in its startups. As of February, 2024, Imagine H2O has worked with over 217 water startups to tackle climate change, improve health, expand equity, and advance resource circularity and efficiency.

== Funding ==
Imagine H2O partners with and is sponsored by a number of foundations and corporations, including the Coca Cola Foundation, ADB, and Xylem.

== See also ==
- Water Environment Federation
- American Water Works Association
- Business incubator
