= Shu, Kazakhstan =

Shu, Kazakhstan may refer to:

- Shu, in the Sozak District in South Kazakhstan Province
- Town of Shu, in Kazakhstan's Akmola Oblast
- Shu, Jambyl, frequently referred to as "Shu Station"
- Shu or Chu River
