= David Jung-Kuang Chiu =

American educator

David Jung-Kuang Chiu (pinyin: Qiu Rongguang; 1936–2006) was a Chinese-born American educator, serving as both Professor and Dean at Hofstra University from 1970 to 2001 when he retired.

David J. Chiu was born on July 11, 1936, in Gulangyu, a westernized Island-city in southern China to Minxian and Juyin Chiu. At the time, Gulangyu was the location of the consulate offices of the Western countries in China. Soon after Chiu's birth, the family moved to Qinhuangdao in northern China, the starting point of the Great Wall of China. In 1947 at the age of eleven, Chiu's family moved to Taiwan, because Chiu's father, Mingxian, a commissioner of the Chinese Marine Customs, was sent to recover the Taichung Marine Customs office from Japanese occupation. Chiu went on to earn his B.A. and M.A. in the island of beauty.

Chiu was valedictorian of his graduating class at National Chengchi University an honor which led to a research-assistantship at the University of Iowa, Iowa City, Iowa. At the university, Chiu completed work towards a Ph.D. In 1970 he started teaching at Hofstra University, located on Long Island, New York. During his tenure at Hofstra University Chiu held the positions of Professor of Comparative Literature and Languages, Dean of University Advisement, and Director of Asian Studies.

By knocking at China's door in the summer of 1980 Chiu led the first group of U.S. university students (from across the United States) to visit modern China. These American youth (some of Chinese ancestry) were the first foreigners in modern China to study the Chinese language and culture at East China University in Shanghai. (This program continues to flourish and is the model for many widely available similar programs existing today.) In his efforts at promoting cross-cultural ties, Chiu was active in arranging exchanges of Sino-American professors and students, a major accomplishment of his education programs during the 1980s and 1990s. Chiu was a key contributor in arranging the first business contracts signed between the U.S. and Chinese organizations, the Hofstra Corporation (a conglomerate of Long Island area leading technology companies) and the China Association of Science and Technology in 1985, a time when China had just begun to welcome in the Western world.

While in New York, Chiu also taught for over 10 years at New York University and at the Chinese Center on Long Island. He retired from Hofstra University in the summer of 2001 after thirty-one years of contribution to the university and the Long Island community.

Chiu received a citation and the University Distinguished Service Medal in May 2001 from Hofstra University. Here is a quotation from his citation:

"With deep appreciation for more than a quarter of a century of inspirational service to Hofstra University. Your devotion to the progress of Hofstra contributed substantially to its development from a small liberal arts college to a major regional and national institution of higher learning." (Signed by President James M. Shuart, May 2001)

David J. Chiu, 69, died March 26, 2006, at his home in San Jose, CA from complications due to colorectal cancer.
