= Ju Ho-jin =

South Korean footballer (born 1981)

Ju Ho-Jin
Personal information
- Full name: Ju Ho-Jin (주호진)
- Date of birth: January 1, 1981 (age 45)
- Place of birth: South Korea
- Height: 1.82 m (6 ft 0 in)
- Position: Defender

Team information
- Current team: Incheon United
- Number: 23

Senior career*
Years	Team	Apps	(Gls)
2002–2003	Jeonbuk Hyundai	60	(1)
2004–2005	Incheon United	15	(1)
2006–2007	Gwangju Sangmu	158	(4)
2008–	Incheon United		
- * Club domestic league appearances and goals

Ju Ho-Jin (Korean: 주호진; born January 1, 1981) is a South Korean footballer. Since 2008, he has played for Incheon United (formerly Jeonbuk Hyundai and Gwangju Sangmu).
