= National Taipei University of Business =

Taiwanese business university

- 國立臺北商業大學
- Motto: Public Integrity and Selfless Attitude
- Type: Public
- Established: 1917; August 2014 (as NTUB)
- President: Li-Chung Jen (任立中)
- Academic staff: 720
- Undergraduates: 10,232
- Location: Taipei City; Taoyuan City, Taiwan; 25°02′32″N 121°31′31″E
- Campus: Urban
- Website: www.ntub.edu.tw

Chinese name
- Traditional Chinese: 國立臺北商業大學
Transcriptions
Standard Mandarin
- Hanyu Pinyin: Guólì Táiběi Shāngyè Dàxué
Southern Min
- Hokkien POJ: Kok-li̍p Tâi-pak Siong-gia̍p Tāi-ha̍k

National Taipei College of Business
- Traditional Chinese: 國立臺北商業技術學院
Transcriptions
Standard Mandarin
- Hanyu Pinyin: Guólì Táiběi Shāngyè Jìshù Xuéyuàn
Southern Min
- Hokkien POJ: Kok-li̍p Tâi-pak Siong-gia̍p Ki-su̍t Ha̍k-īⁿ

National Taipei University of Business (NTUB; Chinese: 國立臺北商業大學; Pe̍h-ōe-jī: Kok-li̍p Tâi-pak Siong-gia̍p Tāi-ha̍k), formerly known as National Taipei College of Business (NTCB; Chinese: 國立臺北商業技術學院; Pe̍h-ōe-jī: Kok-li̍p Tâi-pak Siong-gia̍p Ki-su̍t Ha̍k-īⁿ), is a national co-educational college located in Taipei City and Taoyuan City, Taiwan.

== Alumni ==
- Wang Chien-shien - president of Control Yuan (2008–2014)
- Chang Yung-fa - chairman and founder of Evergreen Marine
- Vivian Hsu - Taiwanese Mandopop singer
- Wayne Pai - founder of Polaris Group, second largest securities brokerage in Taiwan

== See also ==
- List of universities and colleges in Taipei
