= Qiu Deshu =

Chinese contemporary artist

- Born: 1948 (age 77–78); Shanghai, China
- Education: Shanghai Art School
- Known for: Chinese Abstraction

Chinese name
- Chinese: 仇德樹
Transcriptions

Qiu Deshu (Chinese: 仇德樹; born 1948), is a Chinese contemporary artist. He is best known for founding Caocao (Grass Grass) Group, an artist collective which endeavored to promote artistic originality, in 1979.

== Early life ==
Qiu Deshu grew up in the former Shanghai French Concession, where he attended after-school art classes at the Luwan District Children's Palace. There, he developed his enthusiasm and passion for art by studying drawing, Western painting, and ink painting. Qiu Deshu's artistic career began as an "artist-worker" during the Cultural Revolution. While Qiu worked as a factory worker at a leather factory which later became a plastics factory, he kept a sketchbook in his pocket and drew portraits of his colleagues during breaks at the factory. Between 1970 and 1973, Qiu attended the Shanghai Art School (上海美術專科學校) for "worker training", during which he created political cartoons with his classmates and teachers.

== Career ==
=== Caocao (Grass Grass) Group ===
In 1977, he moved from the factory to the Luwan District Cultural Palace, where he curated a series of exhibitions. He later established Caocao (meaning: Grass Grass) group, a collective consisting of twelve artists. The name Caocao was chosen as it symbolizes the "strength of life", for grass grows almost everywhere and is a symbol of hope. The three major goals of Caocao Group were independent spirit, independent technique, and independent style.

Turning away from Socialist Realism, the Caocao group rejected the use of ink painting as a political gesture of nationalism. They instead associated with the ideology of Chinese literati art, which was considered as a cultural relic to the Maoist regime. At the same time, they were also eager explorers of modernism, celebrating both forms of art.

The group exhibited at the Luwan District Cultural Palace in February, 1980. The exhibition, titled Painting for the '80s, included watercolors and traditional paintings, as well as experimental works reminiscent of the Cubist and Expressionist works the artists had seen in books. However, the authorities soon shut down the exhibition and condemned it, along with the Grass Group itself, as a "typical example of bourgeois liberalism in the Luwan District Cultural System."

=== Fissure Art ===
Shortly after the Painting for the '80s exhibition, Qiu began to develop a series called Fissuring in 1982. Qiu was inspired from a crack on an old slate by chance, which is when he started to create works for his Fissure Series. Struggling to achieve a formal breakthrough with his experiments in torn paper, he discovered a new direction in these fissures.

No longer using ink and color to directly create forms or lines on the surface, he instead applies solid or abstract patterns of ink and color onto the backing paper or canvas, and then pastes fragments of plain painting paper onto the surface. Since then, abstract fissures or cracks became the central image or structure of his work. He has continued to study the techniques and deepened its themes in the past two decades.

In 2008, he was honored with a major solo exhibition at the Shanghai Art Museum, and he remains one of the most influential and active contemporary ink artists today.

== Museum collections ==
Qiu's works are included in the institutional collections of the National Art Museum of China, Beijing; Shanghai Art Museum,, Shanghai; Asian Art Museum of San Francisco, San Francisco; Museum of Fine Arts, Boston, Boston; Yale University Art Gallery, New Haven; Taichung Provincial Art Museum, Taichung.
