= Qiū (surname) =

Qiu
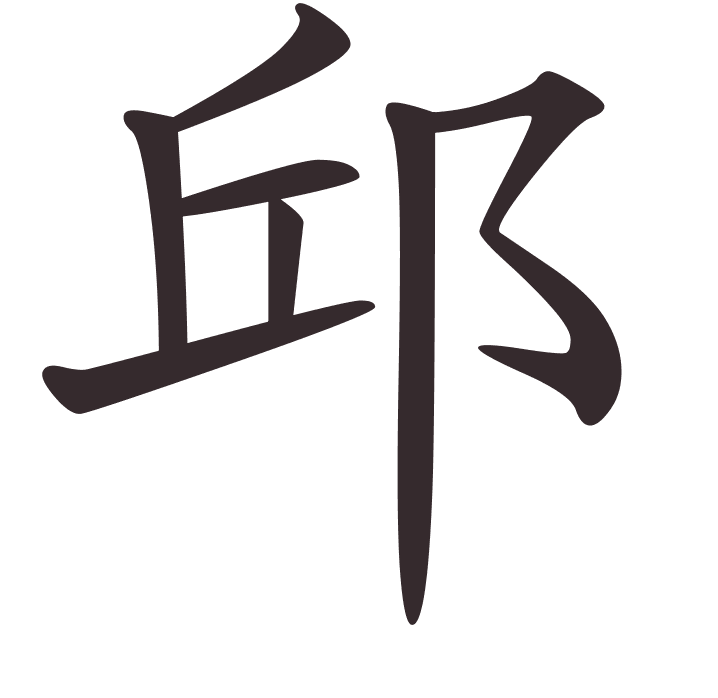
- Qiū surname in traditional Chinese characters
- Pronunciation: Qiū (Pinyin); Jau1 (Jyutping); Khu (Pe̍h-ōe-jī)
- Language: Chinese, Korean

Origin
- Language: Old Chinese
- Region of origin: China

Other names
- Variant forms: Qiū (Mandarin); Yau (Cantonese); Kho, Khoe, Khoo, Koo, Khu (Hokkien, Teochew); Khâu (Vietnamese); Koo, Gu, Ku (Korean)

Qiu is an East Asian surname (Chinese: 丘/邱; pinyin: Qiū; Wade–Giles: Ch'iu¹; Jyutping: Jau1; Pe̍h-ōe-jī: Khu). It is common in mainland China and is also one of the most prominent surnames in Taiwan, as well as in the Sichuan and Fujian provinces in the South China region. As well as being a surname, the character 邱 also means "mound, dune, or hill". A less common surname is 秋, pronounced the same in Mandarin but differently in Cantonese and Hokkien (pinyin: Qiū; Jyutping: Cau1; Pe̍h-ōe-jī: Chhiu).

丘/邱 also appears in Korea, where they may be transliterated as:

- 구 (Korean in Hangul)
- Koo, Gu, Ku (Korean in Revised Romanization).

The surname also appears in the Philippines from immigrants from the south of China. It was anglicized as:

- Cu or Kuh (in Tagalog)

丘/邱 ranks 151st in the Hundred Family Surnames, and is very common in Luoyang, Henan or Wuxing, Zhejiang. 秋 is common with Taiwanese aboriginals, but is otherwise rare, ranking 237th. 邱 is a very rare surname in South Korea, with census records noting a distribution of less than 2000 with the name.

== History ==
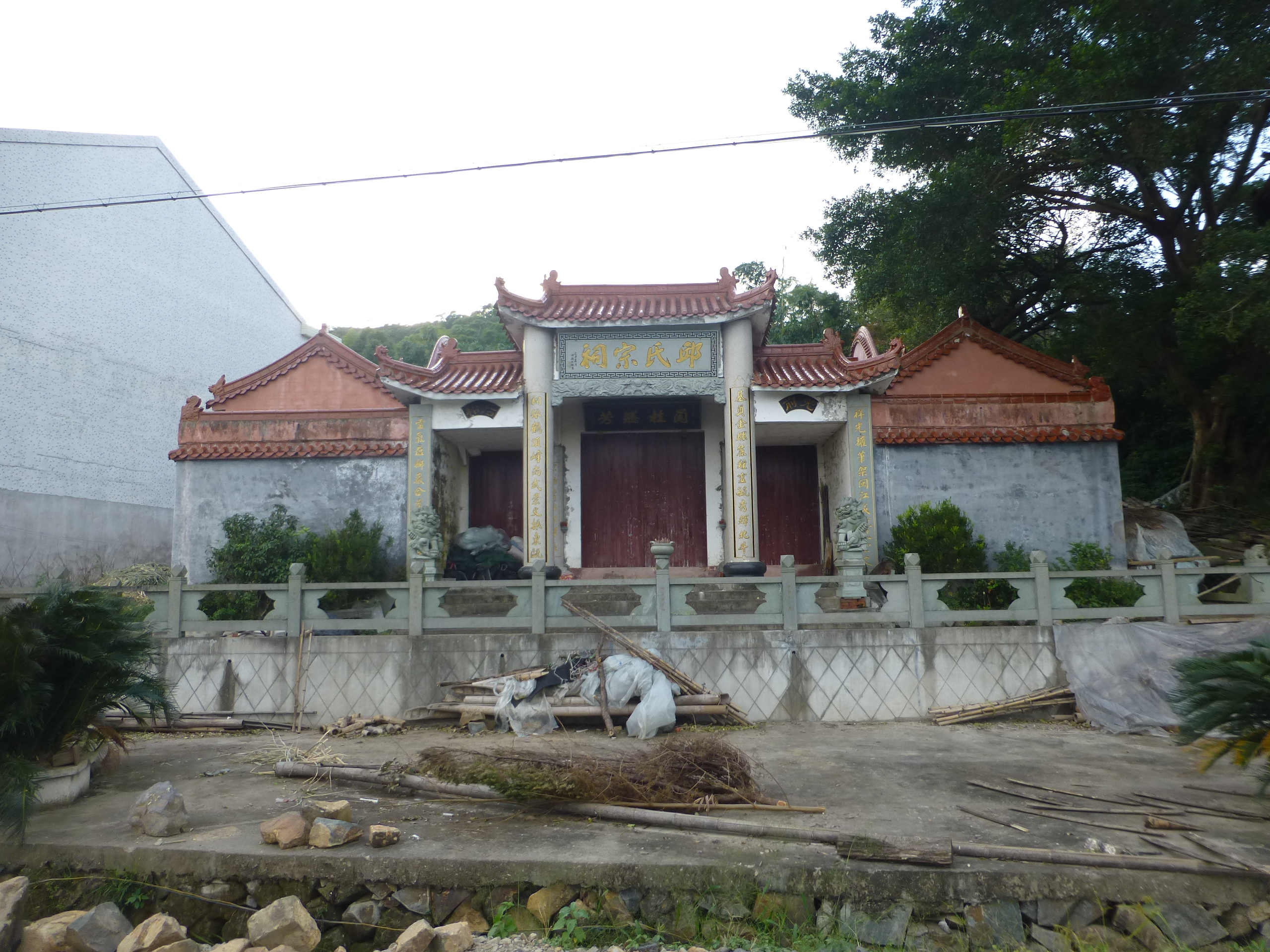
Qiu (邱) family ancestral temple in Xiazai Village, Cangnan County, Zhejiang

The surname has several historical origins:

- In 1046 BC, King Wu of the Zhou dynasty overthrew the Shang dynasty with the help of his adviser, Jiang Ziya. Jiang's clan later settled in the Fufeng County of Shaanxi, where they took the name of the then-capital, Qiu, as their surname. Their descendants bore this surname until the reign of the Yongzheng Emperor (1677–1735) in the Qing dynasty, when some adopted the written form 邱 to distinguish it from the name of Confucius (孔丘). However, the change was mostly adopted by Hokkiens while the Hakkas generally refused. Many Hakkas who refused the change were then prosecuted by the Qing government. It was only after the fall of the Qing dynasty and establishment of the Republic of China in 1912, that some members of the Qiu (邱) family reverted to their ancient surname Qiu (丘)
- In the early Zhou dynasty, King Wu awarded Cao Xie, the descendant of Zhuanxu, the land of Zhu (now it is located southeast part of Qufu, Shandong Province) and established a state there. During the Spring and Autumn period, there was a senior official in the state named Qiu Ruo, and his descendants have taken Qiu as their surname since then.
- An official named Zuo Qiuming in the Lu state in the Spring and Autumn period lived in Zuo Qiu (now in Dingtao in southern Shandong). And his descendants took the last part of the place name as their surname. In the pre-Qin period (21st century-221 BC), most of the Qiu families lived in the Shandong area. After the Qin and Han dynasties, the Qiu families gradually moved to the southern areas. And most of them were big families to the south of the Yangtze River. The Qiu families entered Taiwan in the early Qing dynasty and Qiu has become one of the popular surnames in the country.
- Another sect came from the Qiudun (丘敦) clan of the Wuhuan, who changed their clan name to Qiu when they became sinicized during the Southern and Northern Dynasties
- Zhou dynasty's Ji (姬, Kei, Ki, Hi) clan changed their surname to Qiu (秋) in the early Zhou dynasty.

== Notable people with the surname ==
=== 丘 ===
- Qiu Chuji (丘處機), Chinese Daoist known for his journey from China to Persia
- Qiu Le (丘樂), Chinese weightlifter
- Raymond Yau (丘威), (b. 1978), Chinese-American photographer, video director, and DJ
- Yau Kin Wai (丘建威), Hong Kong football player
- Alan Yau (丘德威), founder of Wagamama, Michelin Star awarded Yauatcha and Hakkasan and an English restaurateur
- Anna Yau (b. 1977), Hong Kong radio DJ, actress and host
- Thaksin Shinawatra (丘達新) (b. 1949), Thai businessman, politician and 23th Prime Minister of Thailand
- Yingluck Shinawatra (丘英樂) (b. 1967), Thai businesswoman, politician and 28th Prime Minister of Thailand, younger sister of Thaksin Shinawatra
- Panthongtae Shinawatra (丘氏) (b. 1979), Thai businessman, founder of Voice TV, son of Thaksin Shinawatra
- Paethongtarn Shinawatra (丘氏) (b. 1986), Thai businesswoman, Chief Adviser to Pheu Thai for participation and innovation, politician and 31st Prime Minister of Thailand, daughter of Thaksin Shinawatra
- Shing-Tung Yau (丘成桐) (b. 1949), a Chinese-American mathematician

=== 邱 ===
- Chiu Chih-wei (邱志偉), Member of the Legislative Yuan
- Chiu Ching-chun (邱鏡淳), Magistrate of Hsinchu County
- Chiu Chuang-huan (1925–2020), President of Examination Yuan (1993–1996)
- Paul Chiu (born 1942), Vice Premier of the Republic of China (2008–2009)
- Chiu Yi (邱毅; Qiu Yi), Taiwanese legislator
- George Hiew Vun Zin (邱文正; Qiu Wenzheng), Malaysian politician
- Hiew King Cheu (邱庆洲;; Qiu Qingzhou), Malaysian politician
- Kho Sock Ling (邱诗凌; Qiu Shiling), Malaysian Chinese singer
- Khoo Sook Yuen (邱菽园; Qiu Shuyuan), Singaporean Chinese poet
- Leslie Khoo Kwee Hock (邱贵福 Qiu Guifu), Singaporean convicted murderer
- Khoo Teck Puat (邱德拔; Qiu Deba), Singaporean Chinese businessman
- Dang Qiu (邱党), German professional table tennis player
- Qiu Dahong (邱大洪), Chinese coastal and offshore engineer
- Qiu Hongmei (邱紅梅), Chinese weightlifter
- Qiu Hongxia (邱紅霞), Chinese weightlifter
- Qiu Jun (邱峻), Chinese go player
- Qiu Miaojin (邱妙津), Taiwanese lesbian author
- Qiu Wei (邱為), Tang dynasty poet.
- Qiu Zhijie (邱志傑), Chinese visual artist
- Benny Yau (邱穟恆), Canadian television personality
- Chingmy Yau (邱淑貞; Qiu Shuzhen), Hong Kong actress
- Herman Yau (邱禮濤; Qiu Litao), Hong Kong film director
- David Chiu (邱信福), Taiwanese American politician
- Qiu Shaoyun (邱少云), Chinese Korean War hero in the 1950s
- Qiu Xinyi (邱欣怡), Taiwanese idol singer based in Shanghai and member of female idol group SNH48

=== 秋 ===
- Qiu Jin (秋瑾), Chinese revolutionary

=== Unknown ===
- John Yau (b. 1950), an American poet

== See also ==
- Qiú (surname) (仇 and 裘)
