= Chao (surname) =

- Language: Chinese, Portuguese, Galician

Origin
- Meaning: Chinese: 晁: "dawn"; 巢: "nest"; 趙: a place name; 兆: "omen"; 曹: a place name; Portuguese and Galician: "plain", "plateau"

Other names
- Variant forms: 趙: Zhao, Chiu; 兆: Zhao, Siu; 曹: Cao, Tso

Chao is a surname in various cultures. It is the Pinyin spelling of two Chinese surnames (晁 and 巢), the Wade–Giles spelling of two others (趙 or the much rarer 兆, both spelled in Pinyin as Zhào), and a regional or other spelling of two additional Chinese surnames (曹 Cáo and 周 Zhōu). It is also a Galician and Portuguese surname.

== Origins ==
=== Chinese surname Cháo (晁) ===
This surname is written with a character meaning "dawn" (晁). According to traditional sources including Fengsu Tongyi, Yuanhe Xingzuan, Xingshi Kaolüe (姓氏考略), and the surnames/clans section (氏族略) of the Tongzhi encyclopedia, both this surname and another written with a character also meaning "dawn" (朝; Zhāo) originated from personal names of people during the Spring and Autumn period, and were adopted by their descendants as surnames, following which some descendants changed their surname from one character to the other. The latter surname originated from Wangzi Zhao, a son of King Jing of Zhou (544–519 BC), while the former originated from Shi Chao (史晁) of the state of Wei. The biography of Chao Cuo in the Records of the Grand Historian stated that the surname originated in the Nanyang Commandery, specifically in the ancient region of Xi'e.

In Sino-Korean pronunciation, those characters are both read Jo, but are not used as surnames in modern Korea (the Korean surname Jo is written with different characters). In Sino-Vietnamese pronunciation, it is read Triều; the spelling is distinct from Triệu, the Sino-Vietnamese reading of the surname Zhào (趙/赵).

It is listed on the Hundred Family Surnames poem.

=== Chinese surname Cháo (巢) ===
Another Chinese surname, homophonous with the above in Mandarin, is written with a character meaning "nest" (巢). Traditional sources note two different origins for this surname. The Xingpu (姓譜) states that it refers to the legendary Youchao, who purportedly lived in a nest high up in a tree before he invented houses; his name literally means "having a nest". The Xingshi Kaolüe (姓氏考略) states that it originated as a toponymic surname referring to the state of Chao; following the defeat of the state of Chao by the state of Wu during the latter part of the Spring and Autumn period, some of the people of the defeated state adopted Chao as their surname.

In Sino-Korean pronunciation, this character is read So, but it is not used as a surname in modern Korea (the Korean surname So is written with different characters). In Sino-Vietnamese pronunciation, it is read Sào.

=== Other ===
Chao is also an alternative spelling of four other Chinese surnames, listed below by their spelling in Pinyin; see those articles for the traditional origins of those surnames:

- Zhào (traditional Chinese: 趙; simplified Chinese: 赵), a common Chinese surname, spelled Chao in the Wade–Giles romanisation system
- Zhào (Chinese: 兆), a much rarer surname also spelled Chao in Wade–Giles
- Zhōu (Chinese: 周), spelled Chao based on its pronunciation in Cantonese (Jyutping: Zau1; Cantonese Yale: Jāu). This spelling is common in Macau.
- Cáo (Chinese: 曹), sometimes spelled in non-standard fashion as Chao

Chao may also be a Portuguese and Galician surname, derived from Galician-Portuguese chão, meaning "plain" or "plateau".

== Statistics ==
In the Third National Population Census of the People's Republic of China in 1982, Cháo meaning "dawn" (晁) was found to be the 361st-most-common surname, while Cháo meaning "nest" (巢) was 420th-most-common. Zhào (赵; 趙) was the seventh-most-common surname, but it is not spelled Chao in mainland China. In Taiwan, where that latter surname frequently is spelled Chao, it was the 43rd-most-common surname in 2005, according to a survey of household registration data by the Ministry of the Interior that year.

In Spain, statistics of the Instituto da Lingua Galega stated that there were 2,703 people with the surname Chao in Galicia, making it the 244th-most-common surname there. The surname could be found in 68 of the 313 municipalities of Galicia. Municipalities with particularly high concentrations of bearers of the surname included Muras (61 people; 2.99% of the local population), Ourol (69; 2.45%), and Pedrafita do Cebreiro (52; 1.72%), all in the Province of Lugo (as were all but one of the ten municipalities with the highest concentrations of bearers of the surname).

According to statistics cited by Patrick Hanks, there were 143 people on the island of Great Britain and none on the island of Ireland with the surname Chao as of 2011. The surname was not present on the island of Great Britain in 1881.

The 2010 United States census found 10,398 people with the surname Chao, making it the 3,432nd-most-common name in the country. This represented an increase from 8,633 (3,769th-most-common) in the 2000 census. In both censuses, slightly less than nine-tenths of the bearers of the surname identified as Asian, between five and seven per cent as Hispanic, and between three and five percent as White. It was the 135th-most-common surname among respondents to the 2000 census who identified as Asian.

== People ==
=== Chinese surname Cháo (晁) ===
- Chao Cuo (晁錯; c. 200–154 BC), Han dynasty official
- Chao Heng (晁衡), Chinese name of Abe no Nakamaro (698–770), Japanese-born Tang dynasty governor of Annam
- Chao Chongzhi (晁冲之; fl. 12th century), Chinese poet
- Chao Na (晁娜; born 1980), Chinese swimmer

Fictional characters:

- Chao Gai (晁蓋) in the 14th-century Chinese novel Water Margin

=== Chinese surname Cháo (巢) ===
- Chao Yuanfang (巢元方; fl. 605–616), Sui dynasty court physician and medical author
- Chao Pengfei (巢鹏飞; born 1987), Chinese football striker

=== Chinese surname Zhào (趙) ===
- T. C. Chao (趙紫宸; 1888–1979), Chinese Christian theologian
- Yuen Ren Chao (趙元任; 1892–1982), Chinese-born American linguist
- Chung-Yao Chao (趙忠堯; 1902–1998), Chinese physicist
- Chao Shao-an (趙少昂; 1905–1998), Chinese artist
- Chao Yao-tung (趙耀東; 1916–2008), Taiwanese politician
- Edward C. T. Chao (趙景德; 1919–2008), Chinese-born American geologist
- Ting Tsung Chao (趙廷箴; 1921–2008), Chinese-born plastics entrepreneur
- Kwang-Chu Chao (趙廣緒; 1925–2013), Chinese-born American chemist
- James S. C. Chao (趙錫成; born 1927), Chinese-born American philanthropist and shipping businessman
- Ruth Mulan Chu Chao (趙朱木蘭; 1930–2007), Chinese-born American philanthropist
- Chao Tzee Cheng (赵自成; 1934–2000), Chinese-born Singaporean forensic pathologist
- Cecil Chao (趙世曾; born 1936), Hong Kong financial industry businessman
- Chao Shou-po (趙守博; born 1941), Taiwanese politician
- Chao Hick Tin (赵锡燊; born 1942), Singaporean judge
- Wing T. Chao (趙永濤; born 1944), Chinese-born American architect
- James Y. Chao (born 1947), Taiwan-born American plastics entrepreneur, son of Ting Tsung Chao
- Albert Chao (趙元德; born 1949), Taiwan-born American plastics entrepreneur, son of Ting Tsung Chao
- Anne Chao (趙蓮菊; born 1951), Taiwanese environmental statistician
- Elaine Chao (趙小蘭; born 1953), American politician (U.S. Secretary of Transportation), daughter of Ruth Mulan Chu Chao
- Winston Chao (趙文瑄; born 1960), Taiwanese actor
- Chao Chuan (趙傳; born 1960), Taiwanese pop singer
- Sissey Chao (趙一豪; born 1963), Taiwanese musician
- Chao Cheng-yu (趙正宇; born 1966), Taiwanese politician
- Chao Fong-pang (趙豐邦; born 1967), Taiwanese pool player
- Rosalind Chao (趙家玲; born 1967), American actress
- Cindy Chao (趙心綺; born 1970s), Taiwanese jewellery designer
- Chao Chien-ming (趙建銘; born 1972), Taiwanese surgeon, son-in-law of former president Chen Shui-bian
- Chao Chih-Kuo (趙志國; born 1972), Taiwanese long jumper
- Joyce Chao (趙虹喬; born 1979), Taiwanese actress
- Chao Chih-chien (趙志堅; born 1983), Taiwanese track and field athlete
- Mark Chao (趙又廷; born 1984), Taiwanese actor
- Ruth Chao (designer) (趙于汶; born 1988), Hong Kong designer
- Allen Chao (趙宇天), Chinese-born American pharmaceuticals businessman
- Chao Hsiu-wa (趙綉娃), Taiwanese politician

=== Chinese surname Cáo (曹) ===
- Chao Kuang Piu (曹光彪; born 1920), Hong Kong textiles businessman
- Charles Chao (曹国伟; born 1961), Chinese businessman, CEO and president of Sina Corp.

=== Chinese surname Zhōu (周) ===
- Jason Chao (周庭希; born 1986), Macau activist
- Chao Man Hou (周文顥; born 1996), Macau swimmer

=== Other ===
People with other surnames spelled Chao, or for whom the Chinese characters of their names are unavailable:

- Ramon Chao (1935–2018), Spanish journalist
- Alexander Wu Chao (born 1949), Taiwanese-American physicist
- Manu Chao (born 1961), French musician
- Chan Chao (born 1966), Burmese-born American photographer
- Mariano Chao (born 1972), Argentine field hockey goalkeeper
- Avianna Chao (born 1975), Chinese-born Canadian sport shooter
- Zoë Chao (born 1985), American actress
- Peter Chao, alias of Davin Tong (born 1987), Canadian YouTube personality
- Lin Chao, American evolutionary biologist
- Roger Chao, Australian explorer
- Ruth K. Chao, American psychologist
- Tom X. Chao, American playwright
- Vic Chao, American actor

Fictional characters:

- Lily Chao, first appeared in the BBC medical drama Casualty in 2013

== See also ==
- Chao (disambiguation)
- Chal (name)
- Char (name)
