= Zhao =

Zhao may refer to:

- Zhao (surname) (赵), a Chinese surname
  - commonly spelled Chao in Taiwan or up until the early 20th century in other regions
  - Chiu, from the Cantonese pronunciation
  - Cho (Korean surname), represent the Hanja 趙 (Chinese: Zhao)
  - Triệu, a Vietnamese surname which is the equivalent of the Mandarin Chinese surname Zhao (趙)
- Zhao County, in Shijiazhuang, Hebei, China
- Zhao family (disambiguation)
  - Zhao family (Internet slang), based on the surname Zhao, an internet term in China which refers to the ruling elite and the rich
- 兆 (zhào), a Chinese numeral which usually represents 10^{6} or 10^{12}
  - Mega-, corresponding SI prefix in China, equals to 10^{6}
  - Tera-, corresponding SI prefix in Taiwan, equals to 10^{12}
- Admiral Zhao, a character in the animated series Avatar: The Last Airbender

== Chinese history ==
- Zhao (state) (403 BC–222 BC), a Warring States period state
- Zhao dynasty (204 BC–111 BC), or Zhao dynasty, the ruling house of the Nanyue state
- Zhao Kingdom (Han dynasty) (203 BC–213 AD), a kingdom or principality in the Han dynasty
- Han-Zhao (304–329), a Sixteen Kingdoms state, known as Zhao (趙) after 319
- Later Zhao (319–351), a Sixteen Kingdoms state
- Zhao (Five Dynasties period) (910–921), a Five Dynasties period state
- House of Zhao (960–1279), the imperial clan of the Song Empire

== See also ==
- Zhao Mausoleum (disambiguation)
- Chao (disambiguation)
- Zhou (disambiguation)
