= Chao =

Chao may refer to:

== People ==
- Chao (surname), various Chinese surnames (including 晁 and 巢, as well as non-Pinyin spellings)
- Zhou (surname) (周), may also be spelled Chao
- Zhao (surname) (趙/赵), may also be spelled Chao in Taiwan and some countries/regions in South-East Asia.

== Places ==
- Chao, Virú, Peru
  - Chao District
  - Chao Valley
- Cerro Chao, or Chao volcano, a lava flow in Chile
- Chao Lake, in Hefei, Anhui Province, China
- Chao (state), a minor state of the Chinese Bronze Age
- Ilhéu Chão, in the Madeira archipelago

== Other uses ==
- Chao (currency) (鈔), the banknote used in Mongol Yuan Dynasty in China
- Chǎo technique (炒), a Chinese stir frying technique
- ChaO, a Japanese film by Yasuhiro Aoki
- Chao method, a way of indicating Chinese tones devised by Yuen Ren Chao
- Chao (朝), the Chinese word for dynasty
- Cháo, the Vietnamese version of congee
- Chao, part of several Thai royal ranks and titles
  - Chao (monarchy), a title of the Lan Na royal family members
- Chao (Sonic the Hedgehog), a fictional species
- Chao, a character from Unico

== See also ==
- Cao (disambiguation)
- Chaos (disambiguation)
- Charo (disambiguation)
- Chau (disambiguation)
- Choa (disambiguation)
- Chow (disambiguation)
- Zhao (disambiguation)
- Ciao (disambiguation)
- Chao Phraya River, Thailand
- Sacred Chao, a symbol of Discordianism
