= Paechon Cho clan =

Korean clan from South Hwanghae Province

- Country: Korea
- Current region: Paechon County
- Founder: Cho Chirin
- Connected members: Cho Gyeong-chul; Jo Young-nam; Cho Yi-hyun; Cho Won-jin; Cho In-won; Cho Zang-hee; Cho Hŏn

Paechon Cho clan (Korean: 배천 조씨; Hanja: 白川 趙氏) was one of the Korean clans. Their Bon-gwan was in Paechon County, South Hwanghae Province. According to the South Korean census in 2015, the number of members in the Paechon Cho clan was 75978. Their founder was Cho Chirin. He was the 3rd son of Zhao Dezhao, who was the eldest son of Emperor Taizu of Song of the Song dynasty. He immigrated to Goryeo in 979 in order to avoid conflicts (His father Dezhao had died that same year; his granduncle Emperor Taizong of Song had been a suspect in his father's and grandfather's deaths.), and was settled in Paechon County, Hwanghae Province. He served as the Grand Master of the Palace with Golden Seal and Purple Ribbon (금자광록대부; 金紫光祿大夫; kŭmja kwangnok taebu) during Hyeonjong of Goryeo’s reign.

== See also ==
- Korean clan names of foreign origin
