= Zhao (surname) =

Chinese surname

Zhao / Chao / Chiu / Triệu
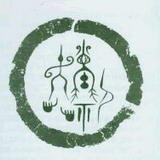
- Pronunciation: Zhào (Mandarin Pinyin); Ziu6 (Cantonese Jyutping); Tiō (Hokkien Pe̍h-ōe-jī); Jo (Korean RR); Triệu (Vietnamese)
- Language: Chinese

Origin
- Meaning: Name of a feudal state during the Zhou dynasty

Other names
- Variant forms: Chao; Cantonese: Jew, Chew, Chiu, Chu, Jew, Jue, Siu, Tsiu; Shanghainese: Zau
- Derivatives: Cho, Triệu

Zhao

Chinese name
- Traditional Chinese: 趙
- Simplified Chinese: 赵
Transcriptions
Standard Mandarin
- Hanyu Pinyin: Zhào
- Wade–Giles: Chao^{4}
- IPA: [ʈʂâʊ]
Wu
- Suzhounese: Zau^{6}
Yue: Cantonese
- Yale Romanization: Jiuh
- Jyutping: Ziu^{6}
Southern Min
- Tâi-lô: Tiō
Middle Chinese
- Middle Chinese: ɖjéu
Old Chinese
- Baxter–Sagart (2014): *[d]rewʔ

Vietnamese name
- Vietnamese alphabet: Triệu

Korean name
- Hangul: 조
Transcriptions
- Revised Romanization: Jo

Zhao (/dʒaʊ/; traditional Chinese: 趙; simplified Chinese: 赵; pinyin: Zhào; Wade–Giles: Chao⁴) is a Chinese-language surname. (Note: For its meanings in ancient Chinese see Kangxi dictionary's entry "趙".) The name is first in the Hundred Family Surnames – the traditional list of all Chinese surnames – because it was the emperor's surname of the Song dynasty (960–1279) when the list was compiled. The first line of the poem is 趙錢孫李 (Zhao, Qian, Sun, Li).

Zhao may be romanized as "Chiu" from the Cantonese pronunciation, and is romanized in Taiwan and Hong Kong as "Chao" in the Wade–Giles system and as Vietnamese family name "Triệu" in Vietnam. Overall, it can be spelled in Chinese characters and romanized rather differently (ex:兆).

== Evolution of the Zhao clan ==
Zhao clan (趙氏) – Royal house of Song dynasty
Zhao clans (趙氏) – Royal house of Qin dynasty
Yíng (嬴姓) – Royal house of Qin (state) and Qin dynasty Royal house of Zhao (state)
The clans of Lian (廉), Xu (徐), Jiang (江), Qin (秦), Zhao (趙), Huang (黄), Liang (梁), Ma (馬), Ge (葛), Gu (谷), Mou (繆), Zhong (鍾), Fei (費), and Qu (瞿)

== Modern culture ==
In Lu Xun's novel The True Story of Ah Q, Ah Q said he belonged to the same clan as Mr. Zhao, who was an honored landlord of the village. Mr. Zhao was very angry. He slapped Ah Q's face and exclaimed: "How could you be named Zhao!—Do you think you are worthy of the name Zhao?"

Since 2015 or earlier, in the Chinese internet, Zhao became the intimation of the Chinese Communist Party and the State of Zhao became the intimation of China. Similarly, The Zhao Family refers to the dignitaries of China, and The Zhao's Army refers to the People's Liberation Army. "How could you be named Zhao!" is popularly used to satirize the people who are humble but pretend to be powerful.

In 2016, the blog writer Program Think set up a GitHub project named Zhao. The project collects the relationships among more than 700 people in over 130 families including Xi Jinping, the general secretary of the Chinese Communist Party, and many other high level government officials of the Chinese Communist Party. The Cyberspace Administration of China requested GitHub to remove the project. Error status code 451 would be reached if the connection request to the project is from China.

== Prominent people with the family name ==
=== Historical figures ===
- Zhao Zheng (趙政/赵政), the first emperor of China, founder of the Qin dynasty, most commonly known as Qin Shi Huang (秦始皇)
- Zhao Chengjiao (趙成蟜/赵成蟜), the first emperor's half-brother, after the first emperor inherited the throne, he rebelled and was killed by the emperor
- Zhao Chou (趙犨/赵犨), warlord during the Late Tang dynasty
- Zhao Dejun (趙德鈞/赵德钧), general of the Five Dynasties and Ten Kingdoms period state Later Tang and Later Tang's predecessor state Jin
- Zhao Gao (趙高/赵高), close advisor to emperors during the Qin dynasty. He was one of the most corrupt, villainous, violent and powerful eunuchs in Chinese history
- Zhao Jieyu (趙鉤弋/赵钩弋), a consort of Emperor Wu of the Han dynasty
- Zhao Kuangyin (趙匡胤/赵匡胤) or Emperor Taizu of Song (宋太祖), the founder of the Song dynasty
- Zhao Deyin (趙德諲/赵德諲), warlord late in the Tang dynasty
- Zhao Dezhao (趙德昭/赵德昭), second son of Emperor Taizu
- Zhao Feiyan (趙飛燕/赵飞燕), empress of the Western Han dynasty to Emperor Cheng
- Zhao Hede (趙合德/赵合德), imperial consort to Emperor Cheng of Han sister to Empress Zhao Feiyan
- Zhao Heng (趙恆/赵恒), third emperor of the Song dynasty
- Zhao Zhen (趙禎/赵祯), fourth emperor of the Song dynasty
- Zhao Shu (趙曙/赵曙), fifth emperor of the Song dynasty
- Zhao Xu (趙頊/赵顼), sixth emperor of the Song dynasty
- Zhao Xu (趙煦/赵煦), seventh emperor of the Song dynasty
- Zhao Ji (趙佶/赵佶), eighth emperor of the Song dynasty, famous for being a skilled poet, painter, calligrapher, and musician.
- Zhao Boju (趙伯駒/赵伯驹), painter during the Song dynasty
- Zhao Tuo (趙佗/赵佗), first king and emperor of Nanyue
- Zhao Yun (趙雲/赵云), general of Shu Han during the era of Three Kingdoms
- Zhao Mengfu (趙孟頫/赵孟𫖯), calligrapher and descendant of the Song imperial family
- Zhao Yong (趙雍/赵雍), calligrapher, second son of Zhao Mengfu and descendant of the Song imperial family
- Zhao Yiguang (趙宧光/赵宧光), literary figure and author during the Ming dynasty, relative of Zhao Mengfu and descendant of the Song imperial family

=== Modern figures ===
- Amanda Zhao Wei (趙巍/赵巍), Chinese student murdered in Canada in 2002
- Zhao Baotong (趙寶桐/赵宝桐) (1928–2003), Chinese Korean War flying ace
- Ben Y. Zhao, Professor of Computer Science at University of Chicago
- Zhao Benshan (趙本山/赵本山), comedian/actor/director
- Carol Zhao (趙一羽/赵一羽; born 1995), Canadian tennis player
- Chloé Zhao (趙婷/赵婷; born 1982), Chinese filmmaker
- Zhao Dan ([趙丹/赵丹), Chinese actor popular during the golden age of Chinese Cinema
- Zhao Erfeng (趙爾豐/赵尔丰) (1845–1911), warlord and historian
- Zhao Erxun (趙爾巽/赵尔巽), governor of Sichuan
- Zhao Fuxin (趙富鑫/赵富鑫; (1904–1999), physics professor
- Zhao Hongbo ([趙宏博/赵宏博), a pairs figure skater
- Jack Zhao, Chinese bridge player
- Zhao Jiamin (趙嘉敏/赵嘉敏), Chinese idol singer and former member of the Chinese idol group SNH48
- Zhao Jingmin (趙京民/赵京民), UN commander, Chinese major general
- Zhao Jingshen (趙景深/赵景深), novelist
- Zhao Jiping (趙季平/赵季平), composer
- Zhao Jiwei (趙繼偉/赵继伟), Chinese basketball player
- Zhao Lijian (趙立堅/赵立坚), Chinese politician
- Zhao Liying (趙麗穎/赵丽颖), Chinese actress
- Zhao Lusi (趙露思/赵露思), Chinese actress
- Zhao Shuli (趙樹理/赵树理), novelist
- Qing Zhao, electronics scientist
- Vincent Zhao (趙文卓/赵文卓), martial artist and actor
- Zhao Wei (趙薇/赵薇), actress
- Xiran Jay Zhao (趙希然/赵希然; born 1997), Chinese-Canadian writer
- Zhao Xintong (趙心童/赵心童; born 1997), Chinese snooker player
- Zhao Yanxia (赵燕侠; 1928–2025), Chinese opera singer
- Zhao Yi ([趙翼/赵翼), poet, historian, and critic during the Qing dynasty
- Zhao Yiman (趙一曼/赵一曼), Chinese freedom fighter
- Zhao Yiqin (趙弈欽/赵弈钦), Chinese actor
- Zhao Yue (趙粵/赵粤), Chinese singer, member of Chinese idol group SNH48, and member of Chinese girl group BonBon Girls 303
- James Zhao Yufan, Hong Kong dancer, singer and member of South Korean boy band Cortis
- Zhao Yongsheng (趙永勝/赵永胜), race walker
- Zhao Yun (趙雲/赵云), Hong Kong lawyer
- Zhao Zhiqian (趙之謙/赵之谦), Qing dynasty calligrapher
- Zhao Ziyang (趙紫陽/赵紫阳), former general secretary of the Chinese Communist Party and premier of China
- Zhao Zong-Yuan (趙宗轅/赵宗辕), Chinese-Australian chess grandmaster
- Elaine L. Chao (趙小蘭/赵小兰), American politician, served as the 24th United States secretary of labor
- Rosalind Chao (趙家玲/赵家玲), American actress
- Sam Chu Lin (趙帝恩/赵帝恩), American journalist
- Yuen Ren Chao (趙元任/赵元任), Chinese linguist
- Cecil Chao (趙世曾/赵世曾), Hong Kong entrepreneur
- Chao Chuan (趙傳/赵传), Taiwanese pop singer
- Mark Chao (趙又廷/赵又廷), Taiwanese actor, singer and model
- Cindy Chao (趙心綺/赵心绮), Taiwanese jewellery designer
- Bondy Chiu (趙學而/赵学而), Hong Kong singer and actress
- Angie Chiu (趙雅芝/赵雅芝), Hong Kong actress, third runner up in the 1973 Miss Hong Kong pageant
- Bryan Chiu, retired Canadian professional football player; played Centre for the Montreal Alouettes in the CFL from 1997 to 2010
- Baldwin Chiu (趙保榮/赵保荣) as Only Won, hip hop artist, actor, producer, martial artist, national White House engineering spokesperson
- Kenny Chiu (趙榮錦/赵荣锦), Canadian politician, Member of Parliament for Steveston—Richmond East
- Keina Chiu (趙慧奈/赵慧奈; born 1995), Japanese-Chinese television news journalist
- Judy Chu (趙美心/赵美心), American politician and educator
- Suisheng Zhao (趙穗生/赵穗生), Chinese political scientist

== See also ==
- Zhao family
  - Zhao (state)
  - House of Zhao
- Hata Clan of Japan
- Aisin Gioro family
