= Ruth Chao =

Ruth Chao may refer to:

- Ruth Chao von Gehren (born 1988), founder of Ode Ona and Ruth Chao Studio
- Ruth Mulan Chu Chao (1930–2007), Chinese American philanthropist
- Ruth K. Chao, American psychologist
