= Cho (Korean surname) =

Korean family name (조)

- Hangul: 조
- Hanja: 趙; 曺
- RR: Jo
- MR: Cho

Cho (Korean: 조, also written as Zo or Jo) is a Korean family name. As of 2000, there were 1,347,730 people by this surname in South Korea, about 2.95% of the total population. The name may represent either of the Hanja 趙 or 曺.

== List of people with the surname ==
=== Cho ===
- Alina Cho (born 1971), American journalist
- Álvaro Cho (born 2007), Brazilian racing driver
- Arden Cho (born 1985), American actress
- Cho Byung-hwa (1921–2003), South Korean poet, critic and essayist
- Cho Byung-kuk (born 1981), South Korean footballer
- Cho Chi-hun (1920–1968), South Korean poet, critic, and activist
- Cho Chikun (born 1956), South Korean Go player
- Cho Chirin (died 1011), Goryeo official
- David Yonggi Cho (1936–2021), South Korean Pentecostal Pastor
- Erica Cho, American artist
- Frank Cho (born 1971), Korean-American comic writer
- Cho Gi-seok (born 1992), South Korean photographer
- Cho Gue-sung (born 1998), South Korean footballer
- Cho Han-gyul (born 2002), South Korean actor
- Cho Ha-seul (born 1997), South Korean singer, member of girl groups Loona, Loona 1/3, and Artms
- Henry Cho (born 1962), American stand-up comedian
- Cho Hun-hyun (born 1953), South Korean Go player
- Cho Hye-ri (stage name Wax, born 1972), South Korean singer
- Cho Hyun (footballer) (born 1974), South Korean footballer
- Cho Hyun-doo (born 1973), South Korean footballer
- Cho Jae-hyun (born 1965), South Korean actor
- Cho Jae-jin (born 1981), retired South Korean footballer
- Cho Ja-young, (stage name Ah Young, born 1991), South Korean singer, member of girl group Dal Shabet
- Cho Jin-woong (born 1976), South Korean actor
- John Cho (born 1972), Korean-American actor
- Cho Joong-hoon (stage name Cho PD, born 1976), South Korean record producer and rapper
- Cho Jun-young (Born 2002), South Korean actor
- Cho Ki-chon (1913–1951), North Korean poet
- Cho Ki-hyang (born 1963), South Korean former field hockey player
- Cho Ki-jung (1939–2007), South Korean potter
- Cho Kwangjo (1482–1520), Korean Neo-Confucian scholar
- Cho Kyoo-hong (born 1967), South Korean politician
- Cho Kyu-hyun (born 1988), South Korean singer, member of boy band Super Junior
- Liz Cho, American newscaster
- Madeleine Cho, Korean saint
- Cho Man-sik (1883–1950), Korean independence activist
- Margaret Cho (born 1968), American comedian
- Cho Mi-yeon (born 1997), South Korean singer, member of girl group (G)I-dle
- Cho Mina (born 1960), South Korean poet
- Cho Min-woo (born 1992), South Korean footballer
- Cho Minhaeng (born 1965), South Korean scientist
- Cho Myung-ik (stage name Mikey, born 1980), South Korean singer
- Cho Nam-chul (1923–2006), South Korean Go player
- Cho Nam-gi (also known as Zhao Nanqi, 1927–2018), Korean Chinese general
- Cho Nam-joo (born 1978), South Korean writer
- Raymond Cho (politician) (born 1936), Korean-Canadian politician
- S. Henry Cho (1934–2012), South Korean taekwondo practitioner
- Sam Cho (born 1990), Korean-American politician and entrepreneur
- Seong-Jin Cho (born 1994), South Korean pianist
- Cho Seung-hee (born 1991), South Korean actress and singer, former member of girl groups F-ve Dolls and DIA
- Seung-hui Cho (1984–2007), South Korean mass murderer
- Cho Seung-woo (born 1980), South Korean actor
- Cho Seung-youn (stage name Woodz, born 1996), South Korean singer-songwriter
- Cho So-hyun (born 1988), South Korean footballer
- Cho Son-jin (born 1970), South Korean Go player
- Cho Soo-hyang (born 1991), South Korean actress
- Cho Sung-won (born 1971), South Korean basketball coach, former commentator, retired player
- SungWon Cho (born 1990), American YouTuber and voice actor
- Cho Tae-yul (born 1955), South Korean diplomat
- Cho Won-hee (born 1983), South Korean former footballer
- Cho Yeo-jeong (born 1981), South Korean actress
- Cho Yi-hyun (born 1999), South Korean actress
- Cho Yong-pil (born 1950), South Korean singer
- Cho Yoon-kyoung, South Korean interdisciplinary researcher
- Cho Yoon-sun (born 1966), South Korean lawyer, writer and politician
- Cho Yoon-jeong (born 1979), South Korean retired tennis player
- Cho Yoon-woo (born 1991), South Korean actor
- Cho Yongmee (born 1962), South Korean poet
- Cho Yu-jung (born 1999), South Korean actress
- Cho Yu-min (born 1996), South Korean footballer
- Cho Zang-hee (born 1936), South Korean neuroscientist

=== Jo ===
- Jo Bang-heon (stage name Tae Jin-ah, born 1953), South Korean trot singer and entertainer
- Jo Bo-ah (born 1991), South Korean actress
- Jo Byeong-kyu (born 1996), South Korean actor
- Jo Dong-hyuk (born 1977), South Korean actor
- Jo Eun-byul (born 1982), South Korean singer and stage actress
- Jo Eun-sook (born 1970), South Korean actress
- Jo Gwang-il (born 1996), South Korean rapper and songwriter
- Jo Han-chul (born 1973), South Korean actor
- Jo Hye-joo (born 1995), South Korean actress and model
- Jo Hyeon-woo (born 1991), South Korean footballer
- Jo Hyu-il (stage name The Black Skirts, born 1982), Korean-American indie rock musician
- Jo Hyun-jae (born 1980), South Korean actor
- Jo Jae-yoon (born 1974), South Korean actor
- Jo Jeong-rae (born 1943), South Korean novelist
- Jo Jin-ho (stage name Jinho, born 1992), South Korean singer, member of boy band Pentagon
- Jo Jin-kyu (born 1960), South Korean film director
- Jo Jung-chi (born 1978), South Korean singer-songwriter and actor
- Jo Jung-eun (born 1996), South Korean actress
- Jo Jung-min (born 1986), South Korean singer-songwriter
- Jo Jung-suk (born 1980), South Korean actor
- Jo Kwang-min (born 1995), South Korean actor, singer, rapper, member of boy band Boyfriend
- Jo Kwon (born 1989), South Korean singer and entertainer, member of boy band 2AM
- Jo Mi-hye (stage name Miryo, born 1981), South Korean rapper, member of girl group Brown Eyed Girls
- Jo Min-su (born 1965), South Korean actress
- Jo Myong-rok (1928–2010), North Korean military officer
- Jo Se-ho (born 1982), South Korean comedian
- Jo Seong-hyeon (stage name Eru, born 1983), American-born South Korean singer and actor
- Jo Shin-ae (born 1982), South Korean actress and model
- Jo Soo-min (born 1999), South Korean actress
- Jo Sumi (born 1962), South Korean coloratura soprano
- Jo Sung-ha (born 1966), South Korean actor
- Jo Sung-hee (born 1979), South Korean film director
- Jo Sung-mo (born 1977), South Korean singer
- Jo Sung-woo (stage name Code Kunst, born 1989), South Korean composer and music producer
- Jo Woo-chan (born 2005), South Korean rapper and member of AllDay Project
- Jo Woo-ri (born 1992), South Korean actress
- Jo Yeon-hee (born 1977), South Korean actress
- Jo Yi-jin (born 1982), South Korean actress
- Jo Yong-in (better known as CoreJJ, born 1994), South Korean League of Legends player
- Jo Yoon-hee (born 1982), South Korean actress
- Jo Young-min (born 1995), South Korean actor, singer, member of boy band Boyfriend
- Jo Young-nam (born 1945), South Korean singer-songwriter
- Jo Yu-ri (born 2001), South Korean singer and actress
- Jo Yun-seo (born 1993), South Korean actress
- GwiIn Jo (Injo) (1619-1652), concubine of King Injo
- Gwiin Jo (Cheoljong) (1842-1865), concubine of King Cheoljong

=== Chough ===
- Keumhee Carrière Chough, Korean-Canadian statistician
- Chough Pyung-ok (1894–1960), South Korean politician

=== Zo ===
- Zo In-sung (born 1981), South Korean actor

=== Fictional characters ===
- Amadeus Cho, a character in Marvel Comics
- Helen Cho, a character in the Marvel Cinematic Universe
- Kimball Cho, a character in The Mentalist
- Dr. Isabel Cho, one of the four main protagonists in Dead Space: Aftermath
- Cho Cheol-gang, the main antagonist in Crash Landing on You
- Cho Sang-woo, a character in Squid Game
- Cho Hyun-ju, a character in Squid Game
- Jo Yi-seo, the female lead of Itaewon Class
- Teacher Jo, the secretary of the main antagonist in Sky Castle
- Jo Yeong and Jo Eun-sup, two characters in The King: Eternal Monarch

== See also ==
- Zhao (surname)
- List of Korean surnames
