= Choa =

Choa may refer to:

- CHOA-FM, a Canadian radio station
- CKSQ-FM, a Canadian radio station formerly CHOA
- Choa (singer) (Park Cho-a, born 1990), South Korean singer and actress
- Choa, a postos of Mozambique
- Children's Healthcare of Atlanta
- Choa Mountains, in Manica Province of Mozambique

== See also ==
- Chao (disambiguation)
