= Q93 =

Q93 may refer to:

== Radio stations ==
Canada

- CHLQ-FM, in Charlottetown, Prince Edward Island
- CKSQ-FM, in Stettler, Alberta

United States

- KALQ-FM, in Alamosa, Colorado
- KQID-FM, in Alexandria, Louisiana
- WNOX, in Karns, Tennessee
- WQUE-FM, in New Orleans, Louisiana

== Other uses ==
- Ad-Dhuha, a surah of the Quran
- French submarine Néréide
