= Zhao family =

Zhao family may refer to:

- The aristocratic Zhao family in Jin (Chinese state) during the Spring and Autumn period
  - Zhao (state) in the Warring States period, founded by the same family
- The ruling house of Zhao dynasty (Nanyue) in southern China and northern Vietnam
- House of Zhao, the imperial clan of the Chinese Song dynasty
- Zhao family (Internet slang), a Chinese meme referring to bureaucrats and dignitaries

== See also ==
- Zhao (surname)
- Zhao (disambiguation)
- The Orphan of Zhao, a Chinese drama concerning the aristocratic Zhao family in Jin
