= Jiyul =

South Korean environmentalist (born 1957)

- Hangul: 조경숙
- RR: Jo Gyeongsuk
- MR: Cho Kyŏngsuk

Dharma name
- Hangul: 지율
- Hanja: 知律
- RR: Jiyul
- MR: Chiyul

Jiyul (born 1957) is a South Korean Buddhist nun belonging to the Jogye Order, the largest in Korean Buddhism. She garnered national and international attention for her environmental activism, which has included dramatic and controversial methods such as a series of fasts-to-the-death. She is also attributed with likely being the founder of South Korea's national ecological movement due to the attention and largest amount of environmental controversy surrounding her Green Resonance movement, the biggest seen in South Korea.

== Biography ==
Jiyul joined the Jogye Order as a novice in 1992, and became fully ordained as a nun in 1997. For many years, after joining the order, she was lived a solitary life focused on meditation. She rarely left her monastery except to walk in the forest.

In 2001, she became aware of the South Korean government's plans to put a tunnel through the mountain where her monastery was located. To protest this project, she fasted a combined 200 days on water, salt and occasional tea. The latest of her four fasts ended in February 2005 on the 100th day. She had gone on this fast to hold President Roh Moo-hyun to his 2002 election promise to halt and re-assess a controversial tunnel project, part of a network of high speed train lines. The track between Seoul and Busan was planned to run through Cheonseongsan. She and environmentalist groups assert that the project poses a threat to the ecosystem of the mountain (which is also a home to her monastery). As part of her protest, five hunger-strikes were undertaken, in total, by her, two of which lasted for a hundred days. In 2003, she prostrated herself 3,000 times a day for 43 days in front of Busan's City Hall.

She was also part of a class action suit on behalf of the Korean salamander (Hynobius leechi), as a representative for the 30 rare species on the mountain. Though 175,000 people signed a supporting petition, a court approved the project, prompting her to set out on the fourth fast. Major environmental, human rights and religious organizations organized candlelight vigils, support petitions and marathon prayers, the making of prayer quilts and paper salamanders and solidarity fasts across the country. When Prime Minister Lee Hae-chan agreed to halt the blasting and conduct a reassessment together with citizens’ groups, she ended her fast. Another outcome was a bipartisan parliamentary committee that called for a major re-thinking of government development policy.

However, in 2009, the construction by the government continued. Though Jiyul tried to stop the continuation of it by putting herself in the way of the construction, it only resulted in her arrest. She lost her lawsuit but was quick to file another shortly after her release. This suit was against the media and found its way to the Supreme Court of Korea. The suit was for clearing this environmentalist movement she inspired from the blame of having cost the country billions in halting construction. She won her suit, resulting in the payment of 10 won to her person (about 1 U.S. cent).

Both the hunger strikes and her "salamander suit" were part of her Green Resonance movement. Her campaign was from 2003 to 2009.

Widely reported in the mainstream press and in the popular alternative media, her actions provoked outpouring of support as well as fierce public controversies over the ethical and long-term political implications of her protest technique.

A book about her, Jiyul Comes out of the Forest, was published in Korean in 2004; it contains excerpts from her diary and other writings.

Her second environmental campaign involved the Four Major Rivers Project, which she started advocating against in 2009. Her form of protest for this environmental issue was taking notes, pictures, and video of these rivers and then showing her documentation of the rivers well-being at schools and public meetings in South Korea. In 2010, she helped run a ‘Nakdong River pilgrimage’ program. This was open to the general public. In 2013, she directed her indie film called “Following Sand River," utilizing the notes, video, and pictures she took. This was to help bring the issue of this river damming to the greater attention of her nation. The government also went ahead with this project despite Jiyul's advocacy that they do the opposite.

== See also ==
- Sunim
