= Method of spiritual victory =

Spiritual method

- Traditional Chinese: 精神勝利法
- Simplified Chinese: 精神胜利法
Transcriptions
Standard Mandarin
- Hanyu Pinyin: Jīngshén shènglì fǎ

The method of spiritual victory (simplified Chinese: 精神胜利法; traditional Chinese: 精神勝利法; pinyin: Jīngshén shènglì fǎ), or spiritual victory method, strategy of spiritual triumph, also known as the spirit of Ah Q, is a concept that Lu Xun criticized in The True Story of Ah Q as a self-comforting method. When Ah Q was beaten or bested, he would use this method to comfort himself. It depicts the mentality of Chinese people in a satirical posture, and also has a derogatory meaning.

Method of spiritual victory is a technique used to regain self-esteem by making oneself feel good through self-hypnosis, and self-anesthesia. Briefly, it is to describe those who have actually suffered losses, but can only shift to seeking self-comfort in spirit.

Method of spiritual victory has gone on to be often referred to as a reflection of a negative characteristic of the Chinese national character. It is broad in the sense that it is possible for everyone to use the spiritual victory method, even for self-comfort and to ignore the dissatisfaction of others.

== See also ==
- The True Story of Ah Q
