= Cho Yongmee =

South Korean poet

- Born: 1962 (age 63–64); Goryeong County, South Korea
- Writing career
- Genre: Poetry

Cho Yongmee (born 1962) is a South Korean poet. She writes poems based on her experience of nature and landscapes through her various senses such as vision, touch and hearing rather than using the abstract and notional mode of expression. Her poems show different aspects of normal phenomena from her sensitive perspective.

== Biography ==
She was born in 1962 in Goryeong County, North Gyeongsang Province and grew up in Daegu. When she was a child, she wanted to be a painter, but because of her parents, she gave up her dream and focused on writing instead. After being admitted to Seoul Institute of the Arts majoring in creative writing, she spent her college life during the turbulent 1980s when the democratization movement was in full swing. At that time, she was in solitude with concerns about the reality of the time and questions about writing. She debuted in 1990 with "Cheongeoneun gasiga mana (청어는 가시가 많아 Herring Has Lots of Bones)" in Hangilmunhak.

She likes to travel solo and writes poems based on her special experience while traveling. After she stayed in Somaemul island alone for three months, she wrote an essay collection titled, Seomeseo bonaen baek nyeon (섬에서 보낸 백 년 One Hundred Years Spent on the Island; 2007). Her habit of continuously traveling around to search for landscapes is related to her painful experience in her youth. She could not keep her promise with Ko Junghee, a poet she was close with, to go to Jirisan mountain together and Ko died from an accident during her trip to Jirisan mountain. After that, she visited Ko's hometown, Haenam, Jeollanam-do Province many times and she found herself attracted to traveling.

She feels fulfilled when she encounters special landscapes where her body and mind are united. Based on her nature-friendly temperament, she wrote a poem, "Dorongnyong sureul nota (도롱뇽 수를 놓다 Embroidered with a Salamander)" to protest against the Gyeongbu Expressway Construction Project from Geumjeongsan mountain to Cheonseongsan mountain

She has long been suffering from a herniated disk and she believes that only those who are ready to go through pain can write good poems. Because of her belief, her poems have repeated subjects of life and pain. She thinks that there is a clear cut between a prose and a poem and that "only one's own thought and view toward an object" can be poetic. She highlights different perspectives to view the world and is cautious not to use cliché in writing poems. She won the Kim Daljin Literary Award in 2005 and the Kim Junseong Literary Award in 2012.

== Writing ==
=== Utilization of Various Senses ===
Cho's poems recognize objects through various senses. The title poem of Bulaneun yeonghoneul jamsikhanda (불안은 영혼을 잠식한다 Anxiety Encroaches Spirit; 1996) embodies abstract subjects such as dream and anxiety through auditory or tactile images. Besides, concrete subjects are newly discovered through various senses. Gieokui haengseong (기억의 행성 Planet of Memory; 2011) well reveals her poetic characteristics of turning an ordinary phenomenon into something special.

=== Ecological Imagination and the Hwaeom Worldview ===
The main subject Cho uses for her poetry is natural landscapes such as trees, grass, flowers, mountains and rivers. Her ecological imagination comes from the thought that nature and human beings are not separated but interconnected. Her philosophy is extended to the Hwaeom worldview.

Nature often appears through a metaphor of her body. Her awareness that nature and human beings are inseparable is a basis for her ecological imagination. In "Afterword" in Ilman mari mulgogiga saneul nalaoreuda (일만 마리 물고기가 산을 날아오르다 Ten Thousand Fish Fly Over the Mountain; 2000), she said that she just wrote down the words of landscapes.

The landscapes in her poetry are from her own vivid experience. Anxiety Encroaches Spirit (1996) was written based on her experience of Haenam and Gangjin and by the time when she wrote Naeui byeolseoe pin aengdunamuneun (나의 별서에 핀 앵두나무 Cherry Trees Blooming in My Hermitage; 2007), her experience of traveling extended to cover most of the southern area of the Korean Peninsula.

Sambeoseul ibeun jahwasang (삼베옷을 입은 자화상 Self-portrait in Linen Clothes; 2004) illustrates human beings as part of nature, not just as an observer who captures nature's movements. The narrator of "Naega bon pungkyeoni (내가 본 풍경이 The Landscape I Saw)" communicates with willow trees, and what is more, identifies herself with the landscape. It is also the case with "Kkot pin odongnamu arae (꽃 핀 오동나무 아래 Under the Blooming Paulownia Tree)." The narrator is identified with gayageum, the paulownia that shares fruits with birds, and the hermit next to the tree. Like this, unification between the landscape and human being, and between the world and self takes place. The unification of human and nature is based on the philosophy of dependent origination where everything is related to each other, and the idea is developed into Hwaeom philosophy. The narrator of "Duung seupji (두웅 습지 Du-ung Wetland)" names the Du-ung Wetland where various creatures harmoniously co-exist the world of Hwaeom. The ultimate purpose of her poetry is eternity and enlightenment with the Hwaeom worldview that tries to overcome differentiation and conflict between human and nature.

== Works ==
1. Poetry Collections

《불안은 영혼을 잠식한다》, 실천문학사, 1996 / Bulaneun yeonghoneul jamsikhanda (Anxiety Encroaches Spirit), Literature and Practice, 1996

《일만 마리 물고기가 산을 날아오르다》, 창작과비평사, 2000 / Ilman mari mulgogiga saneul nalaoreuda (Ten Thousand Fish Fly Over the Mountain) Changbi, 2000.

《삼베옷을 입은 자화상》, 문학과지성사, 2004 / Sambeoseul ibeun jahwasang (Self-portrait in Linen Clothes), Moonji, 2004.

《나의 별서에 핀 앵두나무는》, 문학과지성사, 2007 / Naeui byeolseoe pin aengdunamuneun (Cherry Trees Blooming in My Hermitage), Munji, 2007.

《기억의 행성》, 문학과지성사, 2011 / Gieokui haengseong (Planet of Memory) Moonji, 2011.

《나의 다른 이름들》, 민음사, 2016 / Naui dareun ireumdeul (My Other Names), Mineumsa, 2016.

2. Essays

《섬에서 보낸 백 년》, 샘터, 2007 / Seomeseo bonaen baek nyeon (One Hundred Years Spent on the Island), Saemteo, 2007.

3. Collections

<적벽에 다시>외 9편, 송재학, 이재무, 황인숙, 박라연, 조용미, 손택수, 《공중 외: 2010 제25회 소월시문학상 작품집》, 문학사상사, 2009 / "Jeokbyeoke dasi (On the Red Cliffs Again)," Collection of Awarded poems of the 25th Sowol Poetry Award. Literature & Thought, 2009.

<천리향을 엿보다> 외 9편, 배한봉, 윤제림, 조용미, 손택수, 여태천, 고영민, 《복사꽃 아래 천년: 2011, 제26회 소월시 문학상 작품집》, 문학사상사, 2011 / "Cheonrihyangeul yeotboda (Peeping at Daphne)," Collection of Awarded poems of the 26th Sowol Poetry Award. Literature & Thought, 2011

<봄의 묵서>, 천양희, 김경주, 이근화, 박정대, 이민하, 김언, 이제니, 이재훈, 유형진, 박후기, 조용미, 윤성택 외 8명, 《어쩌다 당신이 좋아서》, 곰, 2013 / "Bomui mukseon (Letter of Spring)," Eojjeoda dangsini joaseo (I Accidentally Like You). Gom, 2013.

<가을밤>, 김이듬, 김행숙, 장석주, 조용미 외, 《이럴 땐 쓸쓸해도 돼》, 천년의상상, 2016 / "Gaeulbam (One Autumn Night)," Ireolttan sseulsseulhaedo doe (Sometimes It is Okay to Feel Lonely), Cheonnyeonui sangsang, 2016.

== Awards ==
- 2005, 16th Kim Daljin Literary Award ("Geomeun damjeup (검은 담즙 Black Bile)")
- 2012, Kim Junseong Literary Award (Planet of Memory)
