= Triệu =

Chinese surname

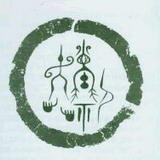
- Pronunciation: Zhào (Mandarin Pinyin); Ziu6 (Cantonese Jyutping); Tiō (Hokkien Pe̍h-ōe-jī); Jo (Korean RR); Triệu (Vietnamese)
- Language: Chinese

Origin
- Meaning: Name of a feudal state during the Zhou dynasty

Other names
- Variant forms: Chao; Cantonese: Jew, Chew, Chiu, Chu, Jew, Jue, Siu, Tsiu; Shanghainese: Zau
- Derivatives: Cho, Triệu

Triệu

Chinese name
- Traditional Chinese: 趙
- Simplified Chinese: 赵
Transcriptions
Standard Mandarin
- Hanyu Pinyin: Zhào
- Wade–Giles: Chao^{4}
- IPA: [ʈʂâʊ]
Wu
- Suzhounese: Zau^{6}
Yue: Cantonese
- Yale Romanization: Jiuh
- Jyutping: Ziu^{6}
Southern Min
- Tâi-lô: Tiō
Middle Chinese
- Middle Chinese: ɖjéu
Old Chinese
- Baxter–Sagart (2014): *[d]rewʔ

Vietnamese name
- Vietnamese alphabet: Triệu

Korean name
- Hangul: 조
Transcriptions
- Revised Romanization: Jo

Triệu (/dʒaʊ/; traditional Chinese: 趙; simplified Chinese: 赵; pinyin: Zhào; Wade–Giles: Chao⁴) is a Chinese-language surname, it is the Vietnamese translation of the Chinese surname Zhao (趙). It is commonly found in Vietnam among its Chinese diaspora. Individuals with the surname, Triệu, likely migrated to Vietnam from the Guangdong and Fujian Provinces of China.

The name is first in the Hundred Family Surnames – the traditional list of all Chinese surnames – because it was the emperor's surname of the Song dynasty (960–1279) when the list was compiled.

Zhao was listed as one of the most common names in China along with Wang, Li, Zhang, Liu, Chen, Yang, Huang, Zhou, and Wu. However, families with the surname "Zhao" that migrated to Vietnam and changed their name to "Triệu" are rare, estimated as 0.16% of the population in Vietnam and 0.001% of the population in the United States.

Trieu is the anglicized variation of the surname Triệu.

== Notable people with the surname Triệu ==
- Zhao dynasty
- Triệu Thị Trinh or Lady Triệu: a female Vietnamese warrior (225 to 248 CE) also known as the Vietnamese Joan of Arc
- Trieu Da General of Qin Dynasty who founded the Trieu Dynasty/Nanyue in Vietnam
- Triệu Việt Vương (Triệu Quang Phục), independence leader in the 6th century
- Andy Trieu (born 1984), Australian host, actor and martial artist. He is a three-time Australian Champion Martial Artist
- Triệu Việt Hưng (born 1997), Vietnamese footballer

== See also ==
- Zhao, surname
- Chui, surname
- Chao, surname
- Cho, surname
- List of common Chinese surnames
- Vietnamese name
