= Korea Engineering Award =

Academic award of South Korea

- Country: South Korea
- First award: 1994
- Website: National Research Foundation of Korea

- Korea Engineering Award
- Hangul: 한국공학상
- Hanja: 韓國工學賞
- RR: Hanguk gonghaksang
- MR: Han'guk konghaksang

The Korea Engineering Award is an award presented to South Koreans and Korean engineers working in domestic universities or research positions. It is currently jointly presented by the Ministry of Science and ICT and the National Research Foundation of Korea. Research achievements are limited to that of a single project conducted in Korea. Potential recipients go through a several stage review which includes consolation with foreign scholars. It is given annually to up to four individuals and is presented with the Korea Science Award. Prize money of KRW 30 million is given in addition to the award.

== Fields ==
The award is given in up to four fields.

- Field 1: Electricity, electronics, metals, computers, information, telecommunications
- Field 2: Machinery, metals, ceramics, aviation, shipbuilding, natural resources, industrial engineering
- Field 3: Chemical engineering, food, polymers, textiles, biotechnology, industrial chemistry
- Field 4: Architecture, civil engineering, environment, energy

== Recipients ==
Year	Field 1	Field 2	Field 3	Field 4
1994	Cho Zang-hee (조장희); KAIST	Min Gyesik (민계식); Hyundai Heavy Industries	Kwon Yeongsu (권영수); Korea Institute of Science and Technology	Choe Changgeun (최창근); KAIST
1996	-	-	Jang Honam (장호남); KAIST	-
1998	-	Han Songyeop (한송엽); Seoul National University	Lee Hwayeong (이화영); Seoul National University	-
2000	-	Lee Jaeyeong (이재영); KAIST	Kim Seongcheol (김성철); KAIST	-
2002	-	Nam Suu (남수우); KAIST	Kim Sangdon (김상돈); KAIST	-
2004	Hyeon Dongseok (현동석); Hanyang University	Kwak Byeongman (곽병만); KAIST	U Seongil (우성일); KAIST	Hong Seongwan (홍성완); Korea Institute of Civil Engineering and Building Technology(한국건설기술연구원)
2006	Han Mingu (한민구); Seoul National University	Lee Jongwon (이종원); KAIST	Lee Hwaseop (이화섭); Korea Institute of Science and Technology	-
2008	Na Jeongung (나정웅); KAIST	Choe Byeonggyu (최병규); KAIST	Bak Gwanhwa (박관화); Seoul National University	-
2010	Lee Gwangbok (이광복); Seoul National University	Kang Seokjung (강석중); KAIST	-	Shin Seongu (신성우); Hanyang University
2012	Hwang Gyuyeong (황규영); KAIST	Yang Dongyeol (양동열); KAIST	-	Ahn Gyuhong (안규홍); Korea Institute of Science and Technology
2014	Bang Seungchan (방승찬); Electronics and Telecommunications Research Institute	Lee Jeongyong (이정용); KAIST	Nam Insik (남인식); POSTECH	-
2016	Mun Geonu (문건우); KAIST	-	-	-
2017	Lee Ingyu (이인규); Korea University	-	Cha Hyeongjun (차형준); POSTECH	-
2018	-	-	Shim Taebo (심태보); Korea Institute of Science and Technology	Choe Wonyong (최원용); POSTECH
2019	Lee Seungjae (이승재); Myongji University	Ha Heonpil (하헌필); Korea Institute of Science and Technology	-	-
2020	Bak Bugyeon (박부견); POSTECH	Lee Yeongguk (이영국); Yonsei University	-	-
2021	-	Lee Taeeok (이태억); KAIST	Lee Taeu (이태우); Seoul National University	-
2022	Min Byeonggwon (민병권); Korea Institute of Science and Technology	Oh Junho (오준호); KAIST	-	-
2023	Lee Junghui (이중희); Jeonbuk National University	-	Jo Gwanghyeon (조광현); KAIST	-
2024	-	Jo Hyung-hee (조형희); Yonsei University	-	Baek Jong-beom (백종범); UNIST

== See also ==
- National Academy of Sciences Award
- NAEK Award
