= Chau =

Chau may refer to:

- Châu, a Vietnamese surname, including a list of people with the name
- Zhou (surname), or Chau, a Chinese family name, including a list of people with the name
- CHAU-DT, a French language television station in Canada
- Chau (album), by Los Fabulosos Cadillacs, 2001
- "Chau#", a 2015 song by Hey! Say! JUMP

== See also ==
- Zhou (disambiguation)
- Chao (disambiguation)
- Chhau dance, a semi-classical Indian dance
- Ciao, an informal salutation in Italian
