= Tom X. Chao =

American playwright

- Education: University of Southern California; New York University
- Occupations: Playwright, writer, actor, musician
- Writing career
- Notable work: Cats Can See the Devil
- Website: tomxchao.com

Tom X. Chao is a comedic playwright, actor, and musician based in New York City whose works have been produced in the United States and Canada. Chao regularly stars in his own work, usually playing an unflattering autobiographical character named "Tom." During the 1990s, Chao was a member of New York City's Art Stars alternative performance scene, and The New York Times called him "a dryly funny downtown comedian," and Time Out New York labeled him a "hilariously angsty writer-performer." He is best known for his play Cats Can See the Devil, which appears in Plays and Playwrights 2004.

In 2016, Chao began collaborating with award-winning playwright-performer Kim Katzberg on a full-length show entitled Hot for Feminist Theory Professor. In June–July 2017, the duo performed a 40-minute excerpt at the This Is Not Normal festival of The Brick Theater, Brooklyn, NY.

Cover art of Statement of Intent by Tom X. Chao.

On November 17, 2023, Chao released "It's Too Early to Celebrate Christmas," a holiday-themed song, via all major streaming platforms. Mixed by Ken Rich at Grand Street Recording, Williamsburg, NYC. This single was followed up with 3 more songs to complete the 4-song EP, Statement of Intent, released on February 29, 2024.

On September 15, 2025, Chao released the Music for Downtown Theater EP which included reworked and newly recorded versions of "Culture Jamming!" "Lower Your Standards," and "Cannot Be Denied," originating in his theater shows. Also a remastered version of "Woman, I'm an A*****e" was included. Collaborators included co-producer and multi-instrumentalist Vern Woodhead (Woodhead, Grace Bergere) and drummer Chris Stromquist (Kultur Shock, Estos Gritos), among others.

A compilation entitled, "I Have Heard: Songs of Tom X. Chao," was released on compact disc, April 1, 2026, containing all 13 of Chao's songs.

== Early life and education ==
Chao received a B.A. in Cinema-Television from the University of Southern California in 1984. While an undergraduate, he also studied fiction writing with T. C. Boyle. Chao also earned a master's degree from the Master of Professional Writing program in 1992. In this program, he studied with Richard Yates, John Rechy, and Hubert Selby, Jr.

Chao also holds a M.A. from New York University's Gallatin School of Individualized Study, conferred in 1996. While at NYU, Chao studied with performance artist Deb Margolin of the Split Britches troupe.

== Plays ==
=== The Negative Energy Field ===
Chao's first production, an experimental one-act play in which he also starred. The lead character spends the entirety of the show delivering existential monologues while lying under a large piece of black cloth, until he is challenged by an otherworldly woman in a white dress. Chao created The Negative Energy Field as part of his Masters thesis in performance art at New York University's Gallatin School of Individualized Study, premiering it in 1996 at Pink, Inc. in New York City, with Shawn Sides originating the role of the Woman in the White Dress. It was subsequently produced at Dixon Place, the New York International Fringe Festival, and elsewhere.

=== Summer, Deepening Then Gone ===
Chao's first produced work to include a full cast and the only in which he has never played a role, Summer, Deepening Then Gone involves a teenage girl who magically summons an unwitting poet to protect her from the unwanted advances of a suitor. It debuted in 1999 at HERE in New York City under the original title The Universe of Despair before being retitled for later productions. Script published on Indietheaternow.com in May 2016 (no longer available).

=== Can't Get Started ===
A one-act play in which a young woman tries to help a hapless King Crimson fan understand relationships, Can't Get Started premiered at the St. Marks Theater in 2000 as Chao's first work as an artist-in-residence at New York's Horse Trade Theater Group. An early performance of the play was included in the video archive series of New York City experimental theater NotPerformanceArt. Can't Get Started later saw multiple productions in Canada, one featuring Chao at the 2006 Edmonton International Fringe Festival, and a revival with a new cast for the 2011 Winnipeg Fringe Theatre Festival.

=== Cats Can See the Devil ===
An absurdist comedy in which an experimental theater production—involving a puppet show in which all the characters are abstract shapes—devolves into a scathing deconstruction of its creator and his failed romantic life when he's confronted and ridiculed by a series of women. Cats Can See the Devil premiered in 2003 at the New York International Fringe Festival in a production starring Chao and directed by John Harlacher, with choreography by Tony Award nominee Alex Timbers. The cast included Krista Worth (AKA Krista Watterworth), later the host of HGTV shows Save My Bath and Splurge & Save. The play was published in the 2004 edition of the Plays and Playwrights anthology series, and monologues from it were excerpted in several books, including The Best Men's Stage Monologues of 2004. "Tuesday's Dream of Fame" monologue has been utilized numerous times for auditions. The original working script for Cats Can See the Devil is in the collection of the New York Public Library for the Performing Arts.

=== Callous Cad ===
A 2009 semi-autobiographical work in which Chao stars as himself on the occasion of a visit by a magical being come to celebrate Tom's first true love. Instead, the Being finds Tom unsatisfied and morose, and she attempts to determine why. Rosalie Purvis originated the role of the Magical Being. In a 2011 revival of the play, Charlotte Pines (previously seen in Play Dead (show) by Todd Robbins and Teller (magician)) was nominated for a New York Innovative Theatre Award for outstanding actress in a lead role for her performance as the Magical Being, a production that The New York Times called "intriguing... droll and ruminative." Script published on Indie Theater Now in September 2016 (no longer available).

== Acting ==
Chao frequently appears in his own plays, usually as himself. Aside from his own work, Chao's acting appearances include Deb Margolin's Critical Mass, Jen Mitas and Hilary Koob-Sassen's feature film The Bioengine, John Harlacher's feature film Urchin, a recreation of the lost 1932 film Charlie Chan's Chance, and the radio comedy Special Relativity. In the early 1990s, Chao appeared as an extra in two feature films by his USC Cinema classmate, Gregg Araki. (Credited with "Special Thanks" in Totally Fucked Up (1993).)

On February 27, 2018, Chao reprised his role as the Stage Manager (and other roles) in a benefit staged reading of Margolin’s Critical Mass at Dixon Place, almost 21 years after the original production at P.S. 122 in 1997. For this reading, several members of the original cast (including former MTV VJ Kevin Seal) were reunited, along with new additions Jim Turner (of Duck's Breath Mystery Theatre) and Dale Goodson.

== Music ==
Tom X. Chao composed original songs for several of his plays. In 2008 he released a four-song EP of original music, The Only Record. It was followed by singles in 2010 and 2012. "It's Too Early to Celebrate Christmas" was released in November 2023, the first single from "Statement of Intent" 4-song EP, released February 29, 2024. "Music for Downtown Theater" EP was released in September 2025, collecting the original songs from his theater shows. In early 2026, the more recent digital-only releases were combined with remastered songs from before 2024, and compiled on a compact disc, "I Have Heard: Songs of Tom X. Chao.

== List of works ==
=== Full-Length Plays ===
- The Negative Energy Field, New York, Pink Inc., 1996.
- Summer, Deepening Then Gone, (née The Universe of Despair), New York, HERE, 1999.
- Can't Get Started, New York, The St. Marks Theater, 2000.
- The Scientists, New York, Surf Reality, 2001.
- Cats Can See the Devil, New York, UNDER St. Marks, 2003.
- Callous Cad, New York, Dixon Place, 2009.
- Hot for Feminist Theory Professor with Kim Katzberg (work-in-progress), New York, The Brick Theater, 2017

=== Short Plays ===
- "Please Don't Eat My Lucky Pear," New York, Dixon Place, 1998.
- "Tom Chao's Sketch Comedy Troupe," New York, DTX, 2001.
- "The Relationship Expert," New York, The St. Marks Theater, 2002.
- "How to Invoke Pan" (with Craig Heimbichner), New York, The Brick Theater, 2004.
- "Jaded Individual," New York, Prospect Theater, 2004.
- "Freak Out Under the Apple Tree," Montreal, CFCF-CTV Stage, 2005.
- "The Peculiar Utterance of the Day," New York, The Red Room, 2007.
- "The Alternative Lifestyle Fair," New York, Ontological-Hysteric Theater, 2008.
- "The King Looks Out for Your Well-Being," Astoria, New York, One-Minute Play Festival, 2010.
- "My Sister's Magnetic Personality," Ottawa, Ottawa Fringe Festival, 2014.
- "40th Anniversary of the Womyn's Empowering Movement Lab," New York, New Ohio Theatre, One-Minute Play Festival, 2016.
- "Man v. Food v. Humanity," New York, New Ohio Theatre, One-Minute Play Festival, 2017.

=== Music ===
- The Only Record 4-song compact disc EP 2008.
- "Woman, I'm an A*****e," 2010.
- "I Wish I Were Pretty," 2012.
- "It's Too Early to Celebrate Christmas," 2023.
- Statement of Intent 4-song EP, 2024.
- Music for Downtown Theater 4-song EP, 2025.
- I Have Heard: Songs of Tom X. Chao compact disc compilation, 2026.

=== Podcasts ===
- The Peculiar Utterance of the Day, libsyn, 2006–2008.
- Tom X. Chao’s New Podcast, Posthaven, 2011-2013.
- Tom X. Chao's Podcast, Soundcloud, 2013–2014.
