= Sissey Chao =

Sissey Chao (Chinese: 趙一豪; pinyin: Zhào Yīháo; born 24 September 1963) is an aggressive, independent musician in Taiwan.

== Biography ==
Chao formed his first band, Double X, in 1985 when he was 17 years old. Considered a pioneer of Taiwanese punk music, the band released their first album, Lying Idiots, through record label Crystal Records in 1985. In that same year they launched a tour around university campuses nationwide. They also supported R.E.M. during the latter’s Monster Tour in Taipei.

Aside from being the frontman of his band, Chao also developed a solo career with a highly unique music style, and released his first solo album Pull Myself Out (1989, Crystal Records). With critical and explicit lyrics, the album proved to be ahead of its time, and was subsequently banned by Taiwan's Government Information Office. The album has since become an underground classic, and recently two of the songs were revived and included into the soundtrack of the critically acclaimed independent movie A Place of One's Own (2009). Between 1989 and 1998, Chao released two more albums, although the number would have been greater if not for the record companies' market oriented approach toward sales. Disillusioned with record deals, he did not sign with another record label and ostensibly went into hiatus in 1998. This did not stop him from writing and making music however, and in 2009 fans were elated to see his return with a 4th studio album, Tripping. Now more mature in his art direction, Chao drifts away from his previously rebellious style of composition and presents a whole new soundscape with lyrics as candid as ever. The 7 songs on the album are beautifully composed and arranged, taking the listener through an extraordinary journey of an artist in a floating world.

== Discography ==
1. Lying Idiots (《白痴的謊言》) (1985)
2. Pull Myself Out (《把我自己掏出来》)(1989)
3. Love/Hate Direct (《直接愛恨》)(1996)
4. 3:36 AM (《凌晨03:36》)(1998)
5. Tripping (《Tripping 旅行/19》)(2009)
