= Chao Hsiu-wa =

Taiwanese politician

- 趙綉娃

Member of the Legislative Yuan
- In office 1 February 1993 – 31 January 1996
- Constituency: Republic of China

Member of the Taiwan Provincial Council
- In office 1 February 1973 – 20 December 1981

Personal details
- Party: Democratic Progressive Party

Chao Hsiu-wa (Chinese: 趙綉娃; pinyin: Zhào Xiùwá) is a Taiwanese politician.

She served on the Taiwan Provincial Council 1973 to 1981 and was affiliated with the tangwai movement. Chao's 1977 reelection campaign was noted for criticisms of Wang Yu-yun. She contested a party primary in August 1992, and subsequently won election to the Legislative Yuan, representing the Democratic Progressive Party between 1993 and 1996.
