= Chao (monarchy) =

Chao (Thai: เจ้า) is a title of the Lan Na royal family members.

== Chao Khan Ha Bai ==
"Chao Khan Ha Bai" (เจ้าห้าขันใบ, lit. 'five lords') It is a royal title for high-ranking royal family members in the 5 Lan Na Principality Consisting of Chiang Mai, Lampang, Lamphun, Nan, and Phrae.
After the collapse of the absolute monarchy of kingdom of Siam, the royal family system was abolished by the People's Party (Khana Ratsadon - คณะราษฎร). Currently, all descendants of the royal family use the surnames Na Chiang Mai, Na Lamphun, Na Lampang, and Na Nan.

- Chao Khan Ha Bai Consists of 5 positions as follows
  1. Chao Luang (เจ้าหลวง)
    The Ruler of the state. is the highest post in the 5 Lan Na Principalitys.
  2. Chao Uparaja (เจ้าอุปราช)
    The Viceroy of the State and the Heir to the Throne
  3. Chao Rajawong (เจ้าราชวงศ์) - Son of Chao Luang.
  4. Chao Burirat (เจ้าบุรีรัตน์) - Son of Chao Luang.
  5. Chao Rajabute (เจ้าราชบุตร) - Son of Chao Luang.
