= Zhao Fuxin =

Chinese professor

Zhao Fuxin (Chinese: 趙富鑫; 1904–1999) was a physics professor at Xi'an Jiaotong University. He was born in Shanghai. He was a member of Chinese Communist Party. Zhao graduated from Nanyang Public School (Predecessor of Xi'an Jiaotong University) Department of Electrical Engineering.
