= Zhao Jingmin =

Chinese general

Zhao Jingmin (赵京民) is the former U.N. force commander for the United Nations peacekeeping mission in Western Sahara of the United Nations and the military head of the United Nations Mission for the Referendum in Western Sahara (MINURSO). He is a major general of the People's Liberation Army.

== Life ==
Major General Zhao was born in Shanxi, China, in 1954. He holds degrees in humanities from the Beijing Foreign Languages Institute and the University of Dakar in Senegal. He obtained junior, intermediary and senior command level diplomas from the Infantry School of Shijiazhuang, the Shijiazhuang Military Academy and the People’s Liberation Army Academy of National Defence, respectively.

== Career ==
Major General Zhao served in the United Nations Iraq-Kuwait Observation Mission (UNIKOM) as Chief Liaison Officer from April 1996 to April 1997 and in MINURSO as United Nations Military Observer from September 1991 to June 1992.

In 2007, he took command of the United Nations Western Sahara peacekeeping mission, becoming the first Chinese officer to lead a UN peacekeeping operation.

Major General Zhao is fluent in English and French.
