= Erica Cho =

Erica Cho is a bi-coastal (Philadelphia and Los Angeles) visual artist, animator, and filmmaker. They are assistant professor of Narrative Media in the Department of Visual Arts at the University of California, San Diego, and were previously a visiting assistant professor at Swarthmore College in the Film and Media Studies department. Cho has acted as a film curator for the Los Angeles Asian Pacific Film Festival since 2011, and organized and founded the first Tri-Co Film Festival in 2012. They have received the Creative Capital Moving Image Award, among other awards.

Cho's work often explores various intersections between LGBTQ and Asian-American themes as described in their 2011 interview with the website Asian Gay and Proud:

In my work, conceptually I’ve been interested in exploring the stereotypes of inscrutability or invisibility and being open to looking at what the potential in that stereotype might be. Asians are perceived to be inscrutable or invisible or voiceless or one of the masses, and I’ll flip it and decide to explore that stereotype and begin to see people who are extroverted and space-taking as actually lacking the ability or potential to be invisible. I know it sounds like I like the stealth ninja, but I won’t immediately accept certain qualities as a weakness."

== Education ==
Cho received a BFA in art from Pennsylvania State University, where they received University Honors, and also received an MFA in Studio Art with an emphasis in experimental film and animation from UC Irvine.

== Selected works ==
- Community Speculators – Queers, Aliens, Time, Space, Love, Labor, and Value, Armory Center for the Arts, May 2013
- New Stories from the Edge of Asia: This/That, San Jose Museum of Art, February 2013
- Grow, Morono Kiang Gallery, June 2010
- You Gave Me Brave, S1F Gallery, October 2009
- 20 Years Ago Today, Japanese American National Museum, October 2008
- Still Present Pasts: Korean Americans and the Forgotten War, LA Artcore Union Center for the Arts, February 2007
