= Zhao Mausoleum =

Zhao Mausoleum may refer to:

- Zhao Mausoleum (Tang dynasty), mausoleum of Chinese emperor Taizong of Tang, located at Jiuzong Mountain, Shaanxi, China
  - Six Steeds of Zhao Mausoleum
- Zhao Mausoleum (Ming dynasty), mausoleum of the Ming emperor Longqing, located in Changping District, Beijing, China
- Zhao Mausoleum (Qing dynasty), mausoleum of the Qing emperor Huang Taji, located in Beiling Park, Shenyang, Liaoning, China
- Zhao Mausoleum (Lê dynasty), mausoleum of Vietnam emperor Thánh Tông of Lê located at Lam Kinh Thanh Hóa province
- Zhao Mausoleum (Trần dynasty ), mausoleum of Vietnam emperor Thái Tông of Trần located at Long Hưng Hưng Yên province
