= Cho In-won =

Political scientist

- Employer: Kyung Hee University

Korean name
- Hangul: 조인원
- Hanja: 趙仁源
- RR: Jo Inwon
- MR: Cho Inwŏn

Dr. Cho In-won, the 13th President of Kyung Hee University, is a political scientist who has pioneered the study of what he calls the "Esthetic Space in Life and Politics." He wishes to reconstitute the "Real Politik" through creative union of reason and emotions, humans and institution, the reality and the romantic. The future society he envisages is centered on humans and to be achieved through discourses on "transcendental engagement." He seeks to transcend today's real politics where ideological confrontations and struggles prevail. As scholar cum social practitioner, Dr. Cho has provided numerous agenda and proposals to the government, mass media, civil society, and international organizations. He served as a member of the Transition Committee of the President of the Republic of Korea to Establish National Visions (1997), Head of the Planning Committee of the 1999 Seoul International Conference of NGOs (1999), and Chairman of the Committee for the Global NGO Complex (2000-). He is a man committed to the search of new ways for human societies in the 21st century.
