= Cho Chirin =

Goryeo official (died 1011)

- Hangul: 조지린
- Hanja: 趙之遴
- RR: Jo Jirin
- MR: Cho Chirin

Posthumous name
- Hangul: 공화
- Hanja: 恭華
- RR: Gonghwa
- MR: Konghwa

Cho Chirin (Korean: 조지린; Hanja: 趙之遴; died 1011) was a Goryeo official and diplomat and the progenitor of the Paechon Cho clan.

== Biography ==
Cho Chirin was from Ŭnch'ŏn-hyŏn (은천현; 銀川縣) in Paekchu (백주; 白州), in modern-day Paechon, North Korea. The Paechon Cho clan claims Cho Chirin as their founder. According to the clan, Cho was the third son of Zhao Dezhao, the crown prince of Emperor Taizu of Song. In 979, Cho fled to Goryeo after a dispute about the imperial succession and settled in Ŭnch'ŏn-hyŏn.

In 995, as the left recipient of edicts (좌승선; 左承宣; chwasŭngsŏn), Cho was sent as a diplomatic envoy to the Liao dynasty to propose a royal marriage between Goryeo and the Liao. He was able to broker a marriage between King Seongjong and Xiao Hengde's daughter, who was also the maternal granddaughter of Emperor Jingzong of Liao. Cho died in 1011 with the positions of Vice Director of the Left of the Secretariat (상서좌복야; 尙書左僕射; sangsŏjwabogya) and assistant executive in political affairs (참지정사; 參知政事; ch'amjijŏngsa), and was given the posthumous name of Konghwa.
