= One-Minute Play Festival =

Series of night plays which are all less than 60 seconds

The One-Minute Play Festival (OMPF, or #1MPF on Twitter) is a national traveling community-based theatre company led by New York based director and dramaturg, Dominic D'Andrea. Since the 2007 OMPF has partnered with theatre companies, social organizations, or other not-for-profits in a dozen American cities. OMPF works with playwrights and other artists to engage in short form theatre making and consensus building within local artistic communities.

OMPF's efforts could be described as "hyper-local" theatre. It promotes a spirit of radical inclusion by representing the culture of playwrights of different age, gender, race culture and points of career.

It is a festival actively looking at and developing the form of the one-minute play. It focuses more on creating an experience rather than focusing on the individual plays themselves. The nature of this play also allows for the experience to be different with each location as the regional voice emerges within the words of the playwrights.

== Mission and History ==
The One-Minute Play Festival (OMPF) is an NYC-based theatre company, founded by producing artistic director Dominic D'Andrea. OMPF works in partnership with theatres sharing playwright or community-specific missions across the country. In each city, OMPF creates locally sourced playwright-focused community events, with the goal of promoting the spirit of radical inclusion by representing local cultures of playwrights of different age, gender, race, culture and points of career.

OMPF attempts to reflect the theatrical landscape of local artistic communities by creating a dialogue between the collective conscious and the individual voice.

OMPF works with partnering organizations to identify programs or initiatives in each community to support with the proceeds from the work. The goal is to find ways to give directly back to the artists in each community. Supported programs have ranged from educational programming, youth poetry projects, teaching artists working in prisons, playwright residencies and memberships, and community arts workshops.

In New York City OMPF has partnered with The Brick Theater, HERE Arts Center, Astoria Performing Arts Center, Primary Stages, The Einhorn School of Performing Arts, INTAR Theatre, Nationally: East LA Rep, Cornerstone Theatre Company, Victory Gardens Theatre, The Playwrights Foundation, Boston Playwrights Theatre, The Deering Estate & South Florida Theatre League, Actor's Express, Rutgers University New Brunswick Theatre Festival, Passage Theatre, InterAct Theatre Company, Mixed Blood Theatre, and others.

Some notable contributors to OMPF have included: David Henry Hwang, Neil LaBute, Tina Howe, Donald Margulies, Nilaja Sun, Lydia Diamond, Phillip Kan Gotanda, Kristoffer Diaz, Rajiv Joseph, Sam Hunter, Karen Hartman, Lisa Loomer, Craig Lucas, Mike Daisey, Greg Kotis & Michael John Garces.
