= Chan Chao =

American photographer

- Born: Chan Tha Chao; 1966 (age 59–60); Kalemyo, Burma
- Occupation: Photographer
- Notable work: Burma: Something Went Wrong, Letter from PLF, Echo
- Website: chanchao.net

Chan Chao (born 1966 in Kalemyo, Burma) is an American photographer.

== Biography ==
Chao was born in Burma (now Myanmar) in 1966. He and his family left Burma for the United States in 1978.

Chao studied under John Gossage at the University of Maryland, College Park. When he turned 30, Chao decided to visit Burma for the first time since his family left but was denied a visa. Instead, he travelled to Thailand and crossed the border illegally into Burma, where he photographed a Burmese rebel camp. These images comprise his books Burma: Something Went Wrong and Letter from PLF. He also has a book of female nudes entitled Echo. His Burma portraits were included in the 2002 Whitney Biennial. Chao was one of 113 artists selected for the show. One of the curators of the show said, "With Chan Chao's photos, there certainly is a quality of photojournalism… but they are also pieces of art."

Chao's photographs are in the permanent collection of the Hirshhorn Museum and Sculpture Garden, the National Gallery of Art (through a 2015 acquisition of works previously in the Corcoran Gallery of Art), the Whitney Museum of American Art, the San Francisco Museum of Modern Art, the Los Angeles County Museum of Art, the New Orleans Museum of Art, and the LaSalle Bank Photography Collection. His work has been published in Colors Magazine, Conde Nast Traveler, GEO Magazine, Culture+Travel Magazine and The Walrus.

Chan Chao lives in the Washington, D.C., area. He teaches photography at George Washington University and American University. He previously taught at the Corcoran College of Art and Design.
