= The True Story of Ah Q =

1921–1922 novella by Lu Xun

- Cover of a 1946 edition of The True Story of Ah Q
- Author: Lu Xun
- Original title: 阿Q正傳
- Language: Vernacular Chinese
- Publication date: 1921
- Publication place: China
- Original text: 阿Q正傳 at Chinese Wikisource
- Translation: The True Story of Ah Q at Wikisource

The True Story of Ah Q
- Traditional Chinese: 阿Q正傳
- Simplified Chinese: 阿Q正传
Transcriptions
Standard Mandarin
- Hanyu Pinyin: Ā Q Zhèngzhuàn
- Wade–Giles: A^{1} Q Chêng^{4}-chuan^{4}
- IPA: [á kʰú ʈʂə̂ŋ.ʈʂwân]
Yue: Cantonese
- Jyutping: aa3 Q zing3 zyun6*2
- IPA: [a˧ kʰiw˥ tsɪŋ˧.tsyn˧˥]

The True Story of Ah Q is an episodic novella written by Lu Xun, first published as a serial between December 4, 1921 and February 12, 1922. It was later placed in his first short story collection Call to Arms (吶喊, Nàhǎn) in 1923 and is the longest work in the collection. The novella is generally held to be a masterpiece of modern Chinese literature, since it is considered one of the first major works to fully utilize Vernacular Chinese after the 1919 May 4th Movement in China.

It was first published in the Beijing Morning News supplement as a serial. Originally Lu Xun wrote the story under the name "Ba Ren" (巴人, "crude fellow"), and so few people knew who wrote the novella. The first installment was published on December 4, 1921, and additional installments appeared weekly and/or fortnightly. The final installment was published on February 12, 1922. The novella had nine chapters. The True Story of Ah Q was listed by BBC as one of the 100 greatest tales ever told, at No. 43.

== Synopsis ==
The story traces the "adventures" of Ah Q, a man from the rural peasant class with little education and no definite occupation. Ah Q is famous for "spiritual victories", Lu Xun's euphemism for self-talk and self-deception even when faced with extreme defeat or humiliation. Ah Q is a bully to the less fortunate but fearful of those who are above him in rank, strength, or power. He persuades himself mentally that he is spiritually "superior" to his oppressors even as he succumbs to their tyranny and suppression. Lu Xun exposes Ah Q's extreme faults as symptomatic of the Chinese national character of his time. The ending of the piece is equally poignant and satirical.

=== Novella form ===
Both the modern novella form and the low social station of the protagonist were new in Chinese literature. But the story consisted of nine serial episodic chapters (an old Chinese method for long folklore 章回體形式, which can consist of hundreds of chapters). This is the only novella published by Lu Xun.

== Metaphor ==
A book of literary studies (literary criticism) on The True Story of Ah Q by Zhang Tianyi and others, called Lun Ah Q (論阿Q).

Lu Xun believed that the purpose of literature was to transform the minds of and enlighten fellow Chinese. He followed the concept of "Wén Yǐ Zài Dào" (文以载道, "literature as a vehicle for Tao (moral message)").

In Chapter One, the author ironically claims that he could not recall nor verify Ah Q's correct name, thus giving the character symbolic anonymity. "Ah" (阿) in Chinese is a diminutive prefix for names. "Q" is short for "Quei", which would today be romanized in Hanyu Pinyin as "Guì." However, as there are many Chinese characters that are pronounced "Quei", the narrator claims he does not know which character he should use, and therefore shortens it to "Q". The deliberate use of a Latin letter is a reference to the concepts of the May Fourth movement, which advocated adoption of Western ideas.

Mao Dun believed that Ah Q represented a "crystallization of Chinese qualities" of his time and that it was not necessarily a satirical work. Zhou Zuoren, the author's brother, in the article "[On] The True Story of Ah Q" (阿Q正传; "Ā Q Zhèngzhuàn") said that the work was, as paraphrased by Paul B. Foster, author of Ah Q Archaeology: Lu Xun, Ah Q, Ah Q Progeny, and the National Character Discourse in Twentieth Century China, "unequivocally satirical" and argued against Mao Dun's point of view.

== Plot ==
Ah Q is known for deluding himself into believing he is the victor every time he loses a fight. In one scene in Chapter 2, Ah Q is beaten and had his silver taels stolen while he was gambling beside the theater. He slaps himself on the face, and because he is the person doing the slapping, he sees himself as the victor.

When Mr. Zhao (趙太爺), an honored landlord of the village, beats Ah Q in a fight, Ah Q considers himself important for having even a tiny association with such a person. Though some villagers suspect Ah Q may have no true association with Mr. Zhao, they do not question the matter closely, and instead give Ah Q more respect for a time.

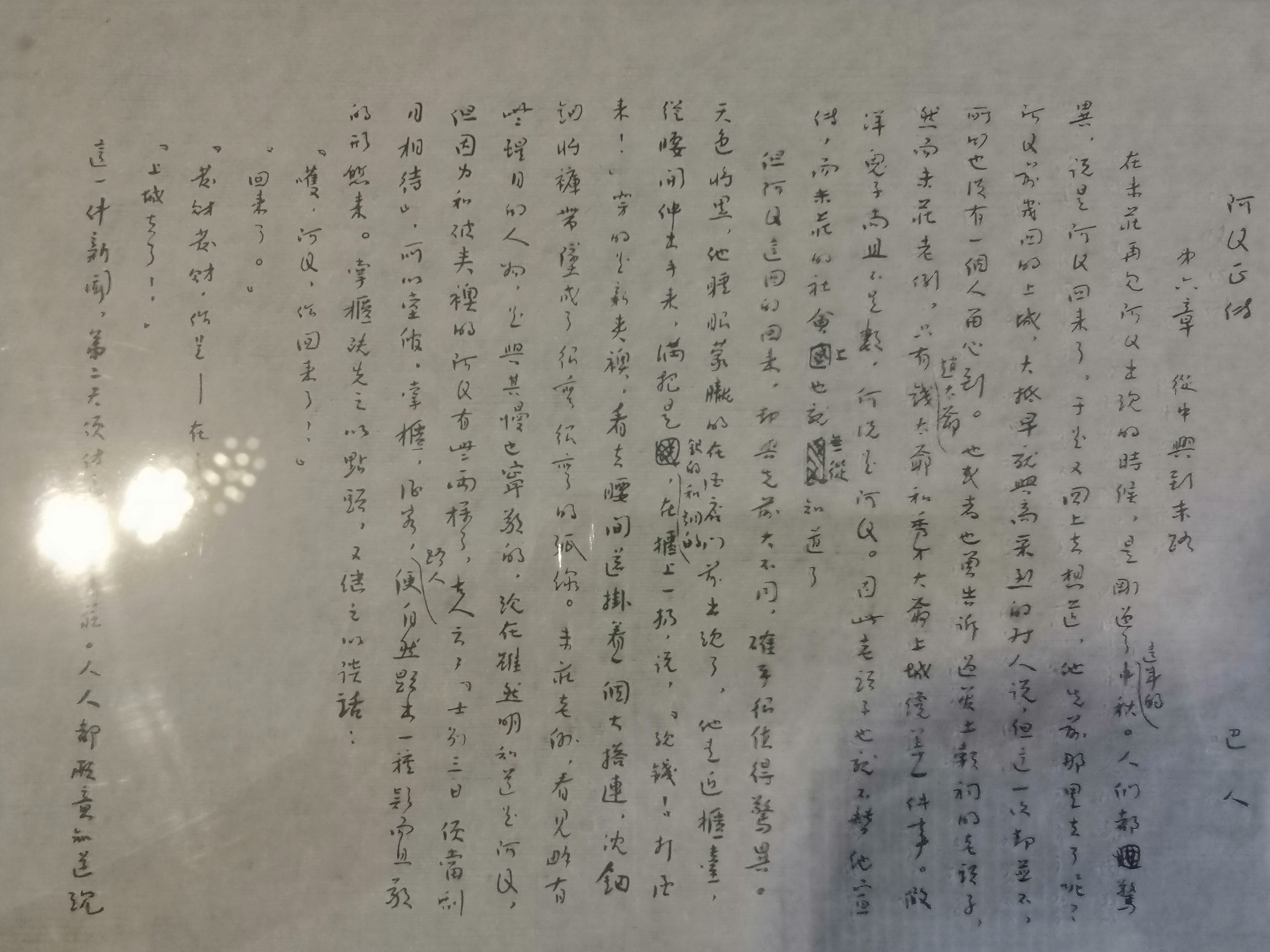
A part of the original manuscript of The True Story of Ah Q, now located in the Beijing Lu Xun Museum

Ah Q is often close-minded about petty things. When he ventures into a new town and sees that a "long bench" is called a "straight bench," he believes their way to be instantly inferior and totally wrong.

There is a scene in which Ah Q harasses a nun to make himself feel better. He pinches her and blames his problems on her. Instead of crying out at the injustice of Ah Q's bullying, the crowd nearby laughs.

One day, news of the Xinhai Revolution comes into town. Both landlord families, the Zhao and the Qian families, become revolutionaries to keep their power. Other people, calling themselves a "revolutionary army", rob the houses of the landlords and rich men. Ah Q also wants to join them and also call himself a revolutionary. But when the time comes, he misses the opportunity to act, because he slept in one morning and no one woke him up. Finally, Ah Q is arrested as a scapegoat for the looting and sentenced to death by the new governor.

When Ah Q is asked to sign a confession, he worries that he cannot write his name. The officers tell him to sign a circle instead. Ah Q is so worried about drawing a perfect circle to save face that he is unaware he would be executed until it is too late. Before his death he tries to entertain the crowds watching his execution, but cannot decide on suitable lines from any Chinese opera. So he decides to sing on his own, but he sang for only one line.

== Protagonist character traits ==
Gloria Davies, the author of an entry in Chinese Literature, Essays, Articles, Reviews, Volumes 13–15, said "[t]he protagonist Ah Q became a symbol of all that was backward, despicable and tragic in Chinese society and often served Chinese intellectuals of the 1920s as a kind of negative criterion against which they could measure China's and their own advance into modernity."

In 1934 Lu Xun wrote to a periodical stating that, in regards to Ah Q, "My method is to make the reader unable to tell who this character can be apart from himself, so that he cannot back away to become a bystander but rather suspects that this is a portrait of himself as well as everyone [in China]. A road to self-examination may therefore be opened to him." Mao Dun saw Ah Q as a representative of China of his time in the same way Oblomov, the main character of Oblomov, represents Russia.

Ah Q is shaped as an image of part-time worker from the poor peasant caste affected by the religions and superstition in feudal society. Living in a semi-feudal semi-colonial society before the Xinhai Revolution, "Ah-Q’s Victories" is the psychological practise of how Ah-Q satisfies himself from real life failures and losses. He escapes from reality, and he bullies the weak and is afraid of the strong. He is unconfident, forgetful and changeable.

There is a claim that, in Ah-Q's name, 'Ah' represents prefix for friendly calling someone in Chinese, and 'Q' represents the imagery symbol of the people with queues in Qing dynasty. In other words, Ah-Q represents everyone who lived in the time of Xinhai revolution in China.

=== Blinded by self-interests ===
In the story, there are many scenes that reveal Ah Q's personality. One of the Ah Q's personality traits is that, no matter what happens, Ah Q always makes an excuse to get out of a tight spot. For instance, in Chapter 3 of the book, the author writes that after the fight Ah Q uses his "precious 'ability to forget'", which shows that he does not have enough courage to deal with his emotions and, instead, uses this "ability" just to satisfy himself.

=== Self-absorption ===
A strong character trait of Ah Q is his limited focus on himself and his own outlook. Ah Q does not consider how others view him, engage in perspective-taking or impression management; this is demonstrated in Chapter 4 during the incident with the young mistress, Amah Wu (吳媽), when he abruptly asks her to sleep with him. In result, Ah Q's actions are strange and at times offend others. However, this does not bother Ah Q because he neither notices nor cares because he is strictly focused on his own needs and desires.

== Chapter summaries ==
=== Chapter 1: Introduction ===
The narrator of the story states that he wishes to author a biography for the titular character, Ah Q. Ironically, the narrator then mentions that several difficulties of why writing about Ah Q is not easy: the title of this book, the surname of Ah Q, the true personal name of Ah Q and his place of birth. The narrator speculates that Ah Q's surname might have been "Zhao," recounting a story of him being beaten by Mr. Zhao, a rich and famous senior villager, because he claimed that his surname was Zhao and thus is related to the Zhao family.

=== Chapter 2: A Brief Account of Ah Q’s Victories ===
In Chapter 2 the narrator elaborates further on Ah Q's character, place in society and his daily routine. Ah Q's peers view him in a very low regard, due to his insignificant background. With no family, no regular employment and eccentric character, Ah Q is often the laughing stock and victim of bullying by the townsfolk. However, Ah Q has a high opinion of himself and looks down on others regardless of their income or status.

The chapter also gives the readers more in-depth imagery on Ah Q's (unfortunate) physical appearance. Specifically, the ringworm scar on his scalp that turns red when he is angry. This scar is a factor in him being ridiculed by the people around him. Ah Q's response differed based on his opponents. He would usually physically or verbally retaliate against the weak, but resorts to denial or self-belittlement against those better than him, and achieves some small emotional satisfaction through his actions.

=== Chapter 3: A Further Account of Ah Q’s Victories ===
Ah Q being slapped in the face by Mr. Zhao making him famous for he has prospered for a long time, as some townsfolk speculate on whether he is truly related to the Zhao family. One day, Ah Q finds Whiskers Wang, another tramp, and sits down next to him with no fear. Due to the lack of two Whiskers (beard), Ah Q feels jealous of Wang and provokes him into a fight. Wang wins and leaves with satisfaction after giving Ah Q a shove to the wall. Later, Ah Q sees Mr. Qian's eldest son, whom Ah Q hates a lot. Ah Q insults him by calling him "Baldhead", and Mr. Qian's son beats him with a walking stick. Ah Q soon forgets everything that has just happened and goes to the alcohol shop. Soon after, when he sees a young nun on the streets, Ah Q claims all the bad luck that has just happened is because of her. Ah Q harasses the nun publicly and she leaves crying and cursing Ah Q. However, the other bystanders in the shop just laugh at him for amusement.

=== Chapter 4: The Tragedies of Love ===
After picking on a nun, Ah Q is victorious and feels as though he is flying right into the Tutelary God's Temple. The words from the nun weigh on his mind: "Ah Q, may you die son-less!" He realizes her insult has some merit and decides that he should take a wife. Ah Q rushes towards Mr. Zhao's maidservant, Amah Wu, and shouts "Sleep with me!" The bailiff finds out about his attack on Mr. Zhao's maidservant and makes Ah Q agree to five terms.

=== Chapter 5: The Problem of Livelihood ===
After the Zhao family fiasco, Ah Q notices unusualness when walking through the streets of Weizhuang. Women have become shy and take refuge indoors while wine shops refused service to him. What worries him is the fact that no household wants to hire him anymore, cutting Ah Q off from any source of income to support his livelihood. Shunned from regular employer's houses, Ah Q finds Young D, a weak beggar of lower status than Ah Q, to have taken Ah Q's odd jobs. To the delight of onlookers, the enraged Ah Q rushes to fight Young D which ends in a tie.

Almost starving, Ah Q returns to the streets and comes across the Convent of Quiet Self-improvement, finding a field containing a patch of turnips. Ah Q decides to steal the turnips until a nun notices him and lets loose her black dog on him. Ah Q runs and is able to escape with some turnips.

=== Chapter 6: From Restoration to Decline ===
Ah Q does not come back to Weizhuang until after the Moon Festival. The custom in Weizhuang is "that when there seem[s] to be something unusual about anyone, he should be treated with respect rather than insolence." According to him, he had been a servant for a successful provincial candidate. Later on, everyone wants to get their hands on Ah Q's silk shirts only to find out that he has run out of them and had been a petty thief.

=== Chapter 7: The Revolution & Chapter 8: Barred From the Revolution ===
One day, the news of the Xinhai Revolution comes. The landlord families become the revolutionaries to maintain their power. When Ah Q realizes that everyone fears the revolutionaries, he decides to be one of them and imagines exploiting rich families in town and ruling over the locals. A group of self-claimed revolutionaries rob the houses of the locals and rich families, and Ah Q is never called to join them. When Ah Q approaches the landlord rebels to express that he wants to join the rebels, he is refused from joining the rebellion. Ah Q becomes bitter that he cannot share the robbed goods and the prestige they enjoy.

=== Chapter 9: The Grand Finale ===
After the Zhao family is robbed, Ah Q is dragged into town in the middle of the night, being carried to a yamen where he is pushed into a room. Keeping with his happy-go-lucky nature, the narrator says "although Ah Q was feeling rather uneasy, he was by no means too depressed." In the end, Ah Q is executed with his cries of "Help, help!" never actually being said. Even before his death, he still preserves his self-absorbed and petty personality; he tries and fails to make his execution more impressive by reciting verses from some Chinese operas, but fails to find the right words.

== Cultural significance ==
One of the reprints after 1923 with the author and English title on the cover

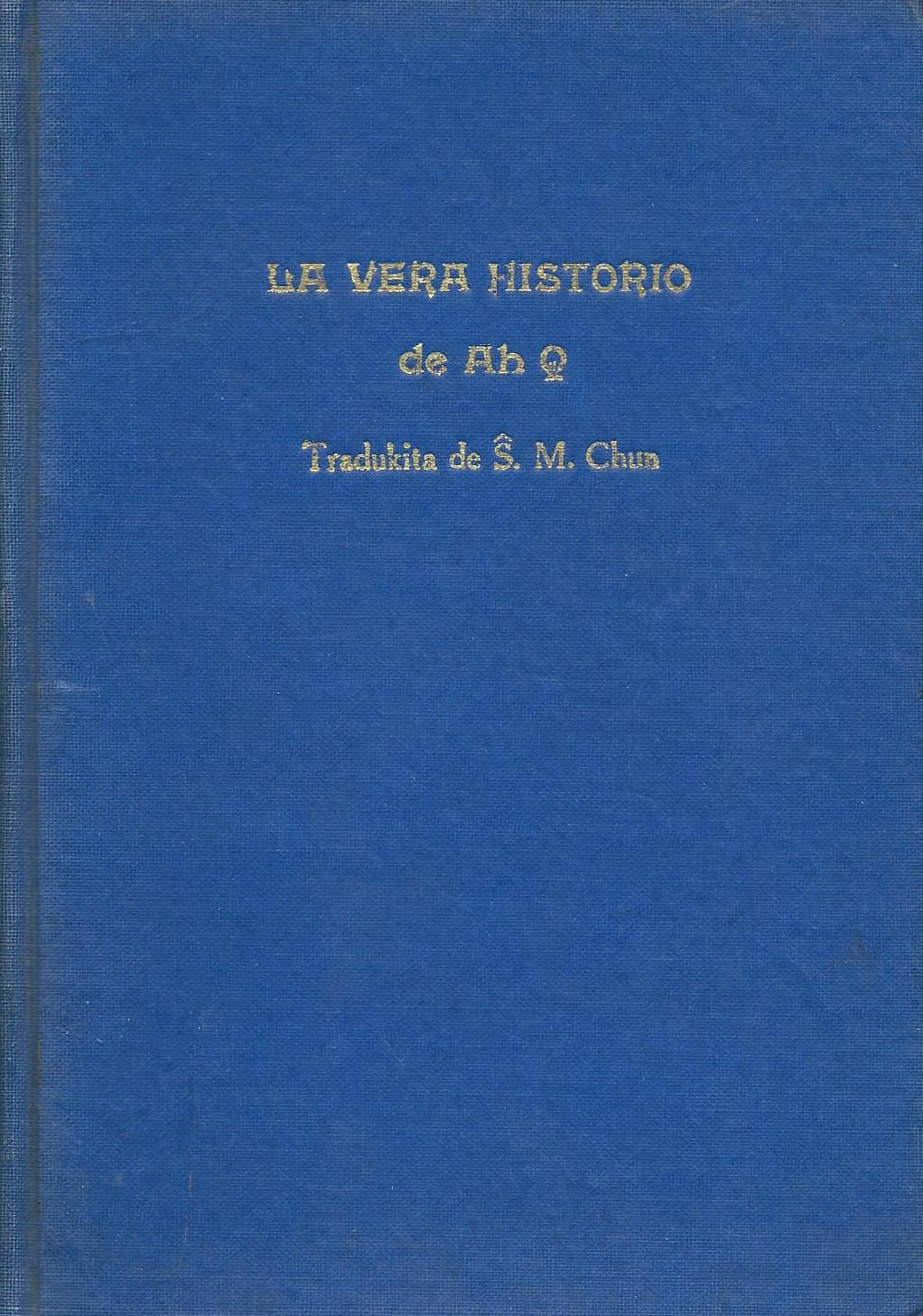
Cover of a 1930 Esperanto translation of the novella

Play cover of Xu Xingzhi's stage adaptation of The True Story of Ah Q

A 1950 illustrated adaptation of The True Story of Ah Q

=== Ah Q as a negative symbol of Chineseness ===
Ah Q has a literary metaphor of national character of his time. Ah Q became a recognizable symbol that expanded the intellectual discourse of national character into the popular consciousness. Originally, the name Ah Q represented a negative Chinese national character (国民性, guómín xìng). A negative example, it served as a warning to urge Chinese to change for the "better". After the publication of The True Story of Ah Q, the " Chinese themselves used the term to label those who are complacently ignorant, indolent, unhygienic, backward, slavish, and parochial". However, because this term is used to describe "negative human characteristics as "natural" components of the Chinese national character, they are ironically accepting and reinforcing certain stereotypical images of the Chinese of the time."

=== References in modern culture ===
The story of Ah Q weaves together nationalism, modern Chinese literature and modern Chinese history.

In modern Chinese language, the term the "Ah Q mentality" (阿Q精神, "Ā Q jīngshén") is used commonly as a term of mockery to describe someone who chooses not to face up to reality and deceives himself into believing he is successful, or has unjustified beliefs of superiority over others. It describes a narcissistic individual who rationalizes every single actual failure he faces as a psychological triumph ("spiritual victory"). A phrase meaning "relax for a bit" or "take it easy" (阿Q一下, Ā Q yí xià) has also surfaced in modern Chinese language due to the character's nonchalant nature.

==== Zhao family ====
The term Zhao Family (赵家人, Zhàojiārén), a derogatory term for China's ruling elite and their families, from the character Mr. Zhao, entered contemporary Chinese language. Originally appeared in a WeChat article, the term subsequently became an internet meme widely used by dissident netizens, with numerous variations such as 赵国 (Zhaos' empire, China) and 精赵 (Zhao's spiritual members, 50 Cent Party).

== Reception ==
When "Ah Q" was first published, the story became very popular. Many Chinese people wondered if Ah Q was based on a real person, partly because at the time few people knew the true identity of the book's author. Gao Yihan said that some individuals believed that Ah Q was based on their own lives. In the 1920s the most common critical sentiment argued that "Ah Q" was a masterpiece.

In 1926 Zheng Zhenduo stated his belief that Lu Xun had finished the story too quickly. In literary terms questioned why Ah Q would die in such a casual manner after the story had already determined that being a revolutionary was already not satisfactory. In response to Zheng, Lu Xun said "So week after week passed, and inevitably the problem arose whether Ah Q would become a revolutionary or not. To my mind, as long as there was no revolution in China, Ah Q would not turn revolutionary; but once there was one, he would. This was the only fate possible for my Ah Q, and I would not say that he has a dual personality. The first year of the Republic has gone, never to return; but the next time there are reforms, I believe there will be revolutionaries like Ah Q. I only wish that, as people say, I had written about a period in the past, but I fear what I saw was not the past but the future — even as much as from twenty to thirty years from now."

Gloria Davies, the author of "The Problematic Modernity of Ah Q," said that many Marxist critics criticized "Ah Q" because the betrayal of the Communists after the 1927 Northern Expedition "bore a dangerous resemblance to Ah Q's fate in front of the firing squad." Davies further explained that "[i]t is perhaps also not too far-fetched to suggest that the Marxist dogmatists perceived in "The True Story of Ah Q" a realism with sufficient power to undermine even their own adamant and much-vaunted belief in the imminent arrival of a Communist utopia; for not even the most foolhardy dogmatist could ignore the countless acts of political violence and betrayal taking place around him, borne variously of the ruthlessness, ambition, cynicism, fear and ignorance, in all, the darker side of the human condition that Lu Xun had portrayed so vividly in "The True Story of Ah Q"." Lu Xun's last response regarding "Ah Q" itself was his reply to Zheng. During the debates on revolutionary literature in 1928 and 1929, Lu Xun decided not to comment on the criticisms of the story.

A leftist critic, Qian Xingcun, wrote an essay "The Dead Era Of Ah Q" (死去了的阿Q时代, "Sǐqùle de Ā Q Shídài"), published in the March 1, 1928 issue of Sun Monthly (太阳月刊, Tàiyáng Yuèkān), No. 3. It was reprinted in Gémìng Wénxué Lùnzhēng Zīliào Xuǎnbiān (革命文学论争资料选编). In it he argued that Lu Xun had belonged to a preceding historical era, the story was not a masterpiece and did not represent the current era. Davies argued that Qian knew he was unable to challenge Lu Xun on literary merits. Furthermore, Davies argues that "it was all the more important to recognize Lu Xun's works as bearing no relevance to the contemporary situation because they were capable of influencing the reader into misrecognizing social reality."

== See also ==
- New Youth

== Bibliography ==
- Davies, Gloria. "The Problematic Modernity of Ah Q." In: Chinese Literature: Essays, Articles, Reviews. Volume 13, December 1991. p. 57–76. ISSN 0161-9705. Also available at Jstor. Also published in: Chinese Literature, Essays, Articles, Reviews, Volumes 13–15. Coda Press, 1991. p. 57–76.
- Foster, Paul B. Ah Q Archaeology: Lu Xun, Ah Q, Ah Q Progeny, And the National Character Discourse in Twentieth Century China. Lexington Books, 2006. ISBN 073911168X, 9780739111680.
- Foster, Paul B. (2010) Ah Q genealogy: Ah Q, Miss Ah Q, national character and the construction of the Ah Q discourse, Asian Studies Review, 28:3, 243-266, DOI: 10.1080/103782042000291088
- Huang, Martin Weizhong. "The Inescapable Predicament: The Narrator and His Discourse in "The True Story of Ah Q"." Modern China, 1990. Volume 16, Issue 4. p. 430-449. Available at Jstor.
- Huters, Theodore E. "Hu Feng and the Critical Legacy of Lu Xun." (Chapter 6). In: Lee, Leo Ou-Fan (editor and author of introduction). Lu Xun & His Legacy. University of California Press, 1985. p. 129–152. ISBN 0520051580, 9780520051584.
- Tambling, Jeremy. Madmen and Other Survivors: Reading Lu Xun's Fiction. Hong Kong University Press, August 30, 2007. ISBN 9622098258, 9789622098251.
- Xing, Xue Yan. "Lu-Xun's"AQ"and Ibuse Masuji's"Ei" ;"AQ（qiu）Zheng Zhuen" and"Mr.Tange's Mansion"." Accessed February 28, 2018. http://www.bunkyo.ac.jp/faculty/kyouken/old_web/bull/Bull11/yan.pdf.
- The Real Story of Ah-Q and Other Tales of China: The Complete Fiction of Lu Xun, trans. Julia Lovell, London: Penguin, 2009.
- Chinese Literature, Foreign Languages Press, 1981.
- Selected Stories of Lu Hsun, Published by Foreign Languages Press, Peking, 1960, 1972; Images for chapters 1 and 4 from Chinese Literature Volume 5-6, 1977.
- "The True Story of Ah Q (Ah Q Zhengzhuan) by Lu Xun, 1923." Reference Guide to Short Fiction. . Retrieved February 28, 2018 from Encyclopedia.com: http://www.encyclopedia.com/arts/encyclopedias-almanacs-transcripts-and-maps/true-story-ah-q-ah-q-zhengzhuan-lu-xun-1923
