= Ruth Chao (designer) =

Creative Director, Founder of Ode Ona and Ruth Chao Studio

Ruth Chao von Gehren
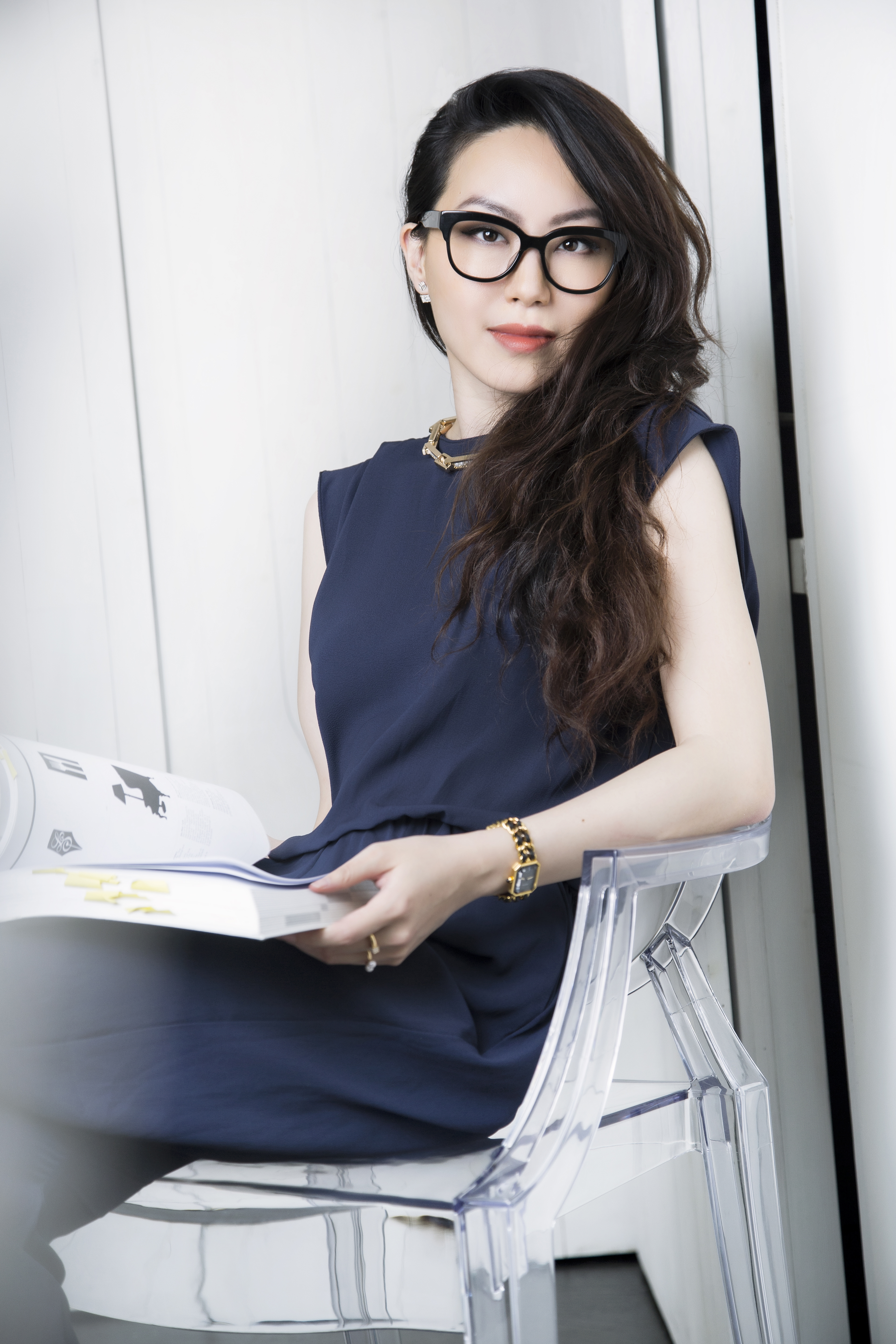
- Chao von Gehren in June 2016
- Born: June 15, 1988 (age 37); Hong Kong
- Occupations: Founder of Ode Ona and creative studio Ruth Chao Studio

Ruth Chao von Gehren (Chinese: 趙于汶; pinyin: Zhào Yúwén; born in 1988 in Hong Kong) is the founder of the fragrance house Ode Ona and the creative studio Ruth Chao Studio. She has been awarded Prestige's 40 under 40 and Perspective’s 40 under 40. She earned a Bachelor's degree in Psychology from the University of Bristol.

== Career ==
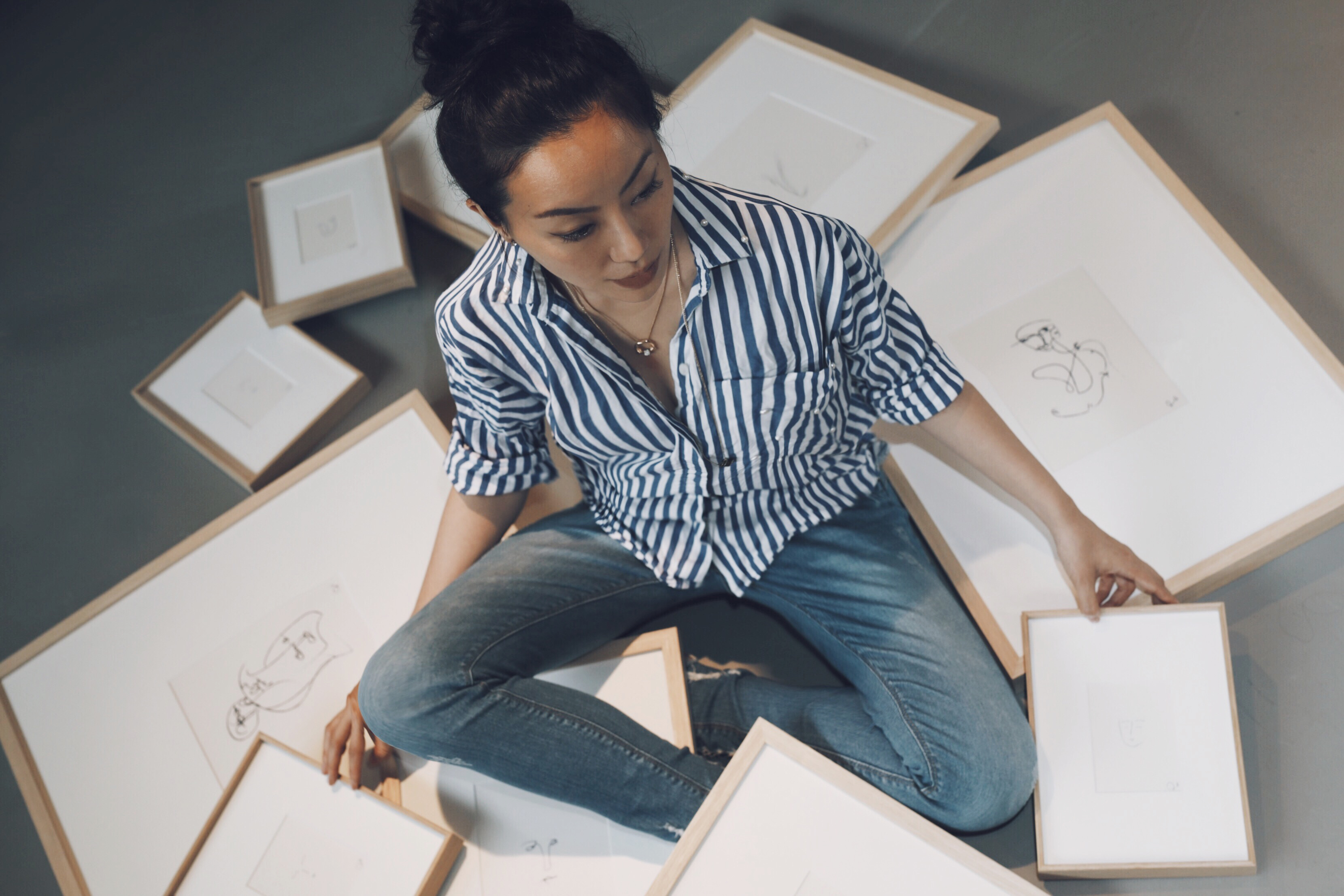
Ruth Chao - New York Times image

Chao started her career at British Vogue. She was trained by Robin Derrick and the now-Creative Director Jaime Perlman. When she returned to Hong Kong, she designed for Lane Crawford and the art director William Chang Suk Ping, where she designed for multiple brands and institutions. She has designed for Maison Margiela, Stella McCartney and The Met Gala.

In 2014, Chao and her partner, Antonia Li, co-founded INDICUBE, a creative agency based in Hong Kong. As Creative Director, Chao focuses on brand identity, artistic drawings, graphic and digital design and development.

Later, Chao launched her creative studio Ruth Chao Studio, to design branding and creative experiences for clients in Hong Kong and London, including Mandarin Oriental, Christian Louboutin, La Prairie, and others. After more than a decade in design, Chao has accumulated more than fifty design awards worldwide, most notably the Graphis Award in New York, and 3 Red Dot Design Awards in Berlin.

In 2023, Chao founded the fragrance house Ode Ona. Made in France, the fragrance collection is a tribute to different states of mind, accessible by intention.
