= Cheonseongsan =

Mountain in South Korea

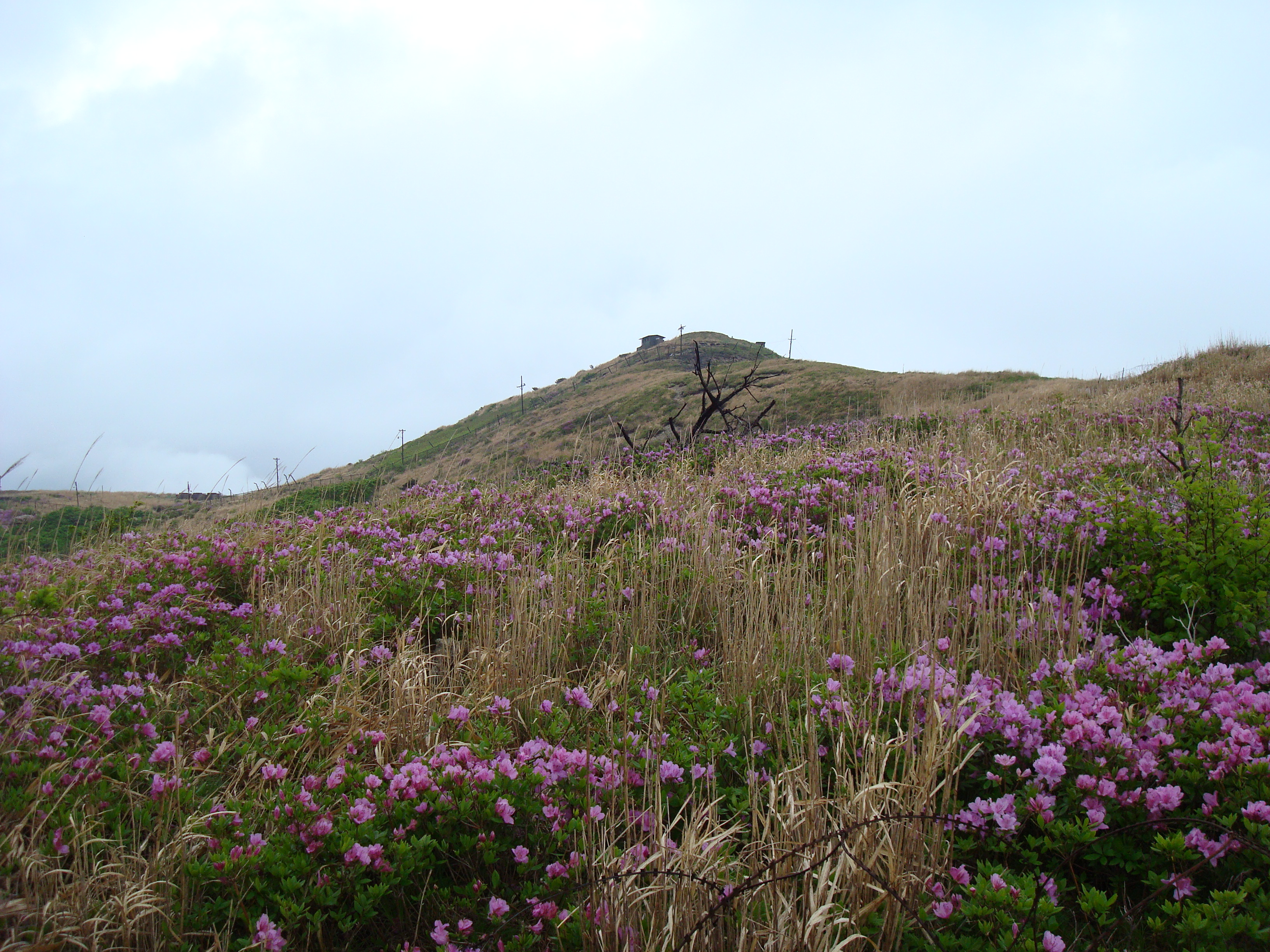

Highest point
- Elevation: 812 m (2,664 ft)
- Listing: Mountains of Korea
- Coordinates: 35°25′13″N 129°06′44″E

Geography
- Country: South Korea
- Province: Gyeongsang

Korean name
- Hangul: 천성산
- Hanja: 千聖山
- RR: Cheonseongsan
- MR: Ch'ŏnsŏngsan

Cheonseongsan (Korean: 천성산) is a mountain of Gyeongsang Province, southeastern South Korea. It has an elevation of 812 metres.
