= CKSQ-FM =

Radio station in Stettler, Alberta

Coordinates: 52.323°N 112.705°W

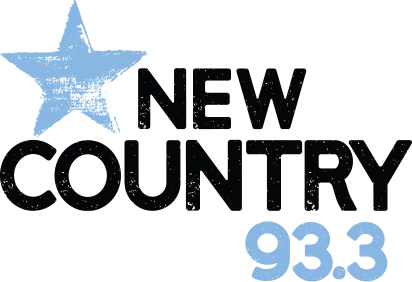
- Stettler, Alberta; Canada
- Frequency: 93.3 MHz
- Branding: New Country 93.3

Programming
- Format: Country

Ownership
- Owner: Stingray Group

History
- First air date: December 15, 1976
- Former call signs: CHOA
- Former frequencies: 1400 kHz (1976–2012)

Technical information
- Licensing authority: CRTC
- Class: B1
- ERP: 11,000 watts (average); 23,000 watts (peak)
- HAAT: 88.6 metres (291 ft)

Links
- Website: newcountrystettler.ca

CKSQ-FM is a Canadian radio station that broadcasts a country format at 93.3 FM in Stettler, Alberta. The station is branded on-air as New Country 93.3 and is currently by Stingray Group.

== History ==
The station began broadcasting in 1976 as CHOA. The call sign was changed to its current one as CKSQ in the early 1980s. In 1985, CKSQ received approval by the CRTC to move from 1400 to 880 kHz, however, this was lost out to CHQT Edmonton in a bid to use the 880 kHz frequency.

== Switch to FM ==
On September 19, 2011, Newcap Inc. applied to convert CKSQ from the AM dial at 1400 kHz to the FM dial. The Canadian Radio-television and Telecommunications Commission approved Newcap's application on February 22, 2012 and the new station will operate at 93.3 MHz.

In 2012, CKSQ moved from 1400 kHz to 93.3 MHz and began testing in September. The official launch on FM was set for October 15, 2012. Formerly branded as Q14 Country, the station is now known as Q93.3

On November 7, 2016, CKSQ rebranded under the Real Country brand, as with many other Newcap-owned country stations in Alberta.

The station was acquired by Stingray Group in 2018.

On March 4, 2024, CKVH rebranded once again, this time to Stingray's New Country brand.

== Past station logos ==
Real Country 93.3 Logo 2016–2024.
