= Chao (state) =

Ancient Chinese state

Chao 巢
- Unknown–c. 580 BC
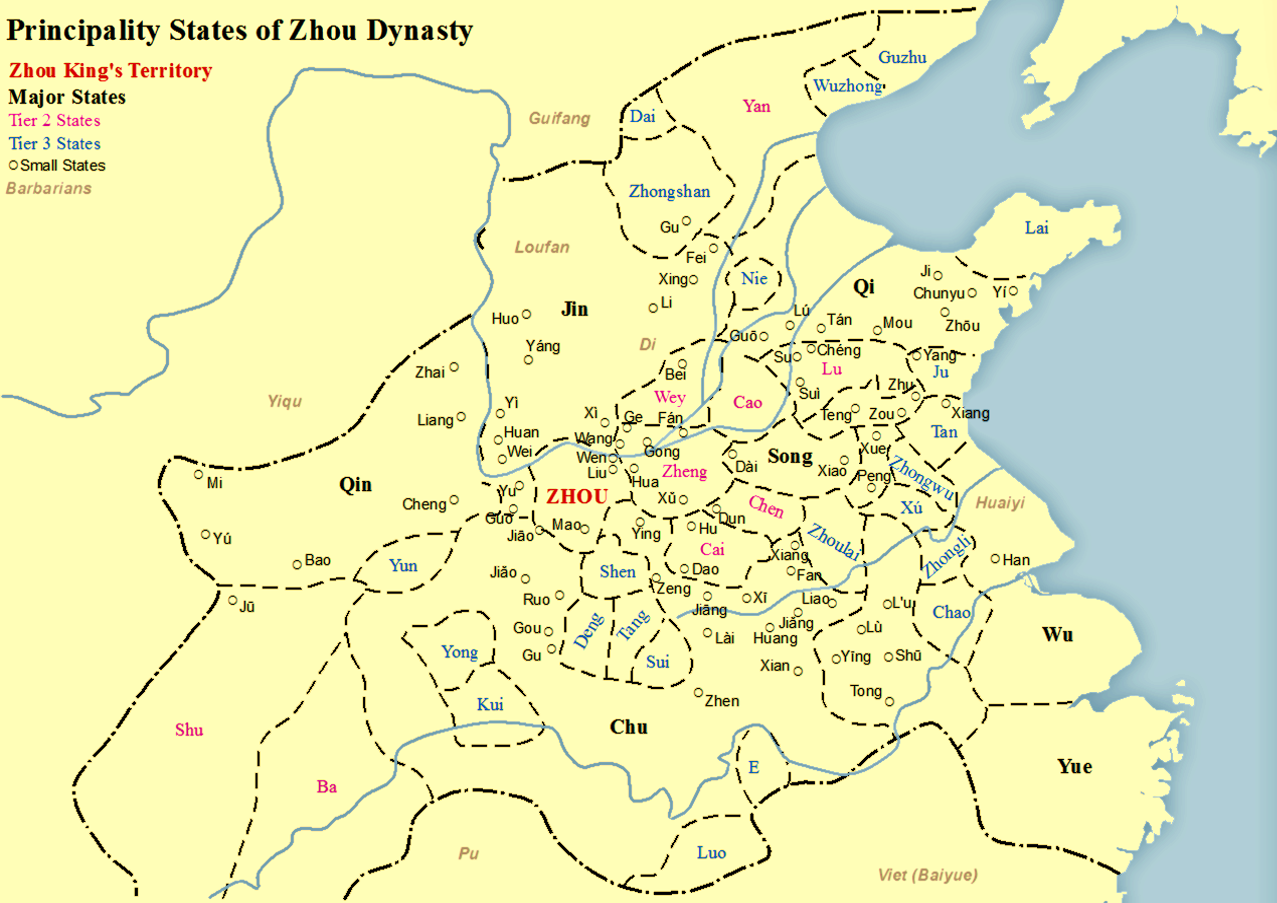
- Chao is a state in the southeast
- Capital: Chao (modern-day Chaohu or near Huainan)
- Government: Monarchy
- Historical era: Late Shang period Western Zhou period Spring and Autumn period
  - Established: Unknown
  - Conquered by Chu: c. 580 BC
Succeeded by
Chu (state)
- Today part of: China

Chao (Chinese: 巢; pinyin: Cháo) was a minor state of the Chinese Bronze Age, whose people belonged to the Shu tribes (群舒, literally "Many Shu") that lived south of the Huai River. Chao's exact location is unknown; traditionally, it was assumed that the state had existed in the vicinity of modern-day Chaohu, Anhui, but more recent sinologists like He Hao and Barry Blakeley consider it more likely that Chao was located further north, near the Huai River.

== History ==
According to the Book of Documents, Chao was a satellite of the Shang dynasty until the latter was overthrown by the Zhou dynasty, whereupon Chao voluntarily submitted to King Wu of Zhou around 1040 BCE. A few decades later during the reign of King Kang of Zhou, however, Chao rebelled and attacked Zhou territory. As result, the Zhou king sent the Six Armies of the West under Tung Kung to defeat Chao, though in the end it was the regional lord of E who defeated and captured Chao's rebellious ruler.

Despite this, Chao remained restive, and when a massive war broke out between Xu and the Zhou dynasty in the 940s BCE, the people of Chao sided with Xu against their overlords. This rebellion, too, proved unsuccessful for Chao, and was crushed when the Duke of Mao captured Chao's capital.

After the Zhou dynasty had largely collapsed in the 8th century BCE, Chao became fully independent, but soon came to be threatened by the expansionist state of Chu. Around 600 BCE, Chao and the other Shu states were forced to officially submit to Chu in order to avoid destruction. Nevertheless, the Shu states continued to maintain their desire for independence, which was supported and stirred by Chu's rival, Wu. In response, Chu began to fully conquer them one by one, beginning with Chao, whose fall is dated between 583 and 575 BCE by He Hao and sometime earlier by Blakeley. Even after the end of its independence, Chao's former capital continued to be a bone of contention between Chu and Wu: King Zhufan of Wu launched an attack on the city in 548 BCE, and was consequently killed during the fighting by a sniper.

== Bibliography ==
- Blakeley, Barry B. (1999). "The Geography of Chu". In Constance A. Cook; John S. Major (eds.). Defining Chu: Image And Reality In Ancient China. Honolulu: University of Hawaii Press. pp. 9–20. ISBN 0-8248-2905-0.
- Sawyer, Ralph D. (2013). Conquest and Domination in early China. Rise and Demise of the Western Chou. CreateSpace Independent Publishing Platform. ISBN 978-1484912485.
- Milburn, Olivia (2016). The Spring and Autumn Annals of Master Yan. Leiden: Brill Publishers. ISBN 978-9004309371.
