= Cho Zang-hee =

South Korean neuroscientist (born 1936)

Zang-Hee Cho
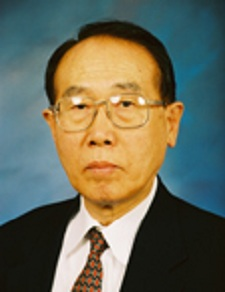
- Born: Zang-Hee Cho; 1936 (age 89–90); Korea
- Education: Seoul National University (BS); Uppsala University (Ph.D)
- Known for: Nuclear Electronics (Prof. Tove), Nuclear Physics (Prof. Gerholm)
- Scientific career
- Fields: Neuroscience & Medical Imaging
- Workplaces: Neuroscience Convergence Center, Korea Univ.
- Doctoral advisor: Professor P-A Tove, Institute of Physics, Uppsala Univ. Sweden,(Ph.D) Professor T-R Gerholm, Institute of Physics, Stockholm University, Sweden, (Fil.D, Docent)

Korean name
- Hangul: 조장희
- Hanja: 趙長熙
- RR: Jo Janghui
- MR: Cho Changhŭi

Zang-Hee Cho (Korean: 조장희; born 1936) is a South Korean neuroscientist who developed the first Ring-PET scanner and the scintillation detector BGO. More recently, Cho developed the first PET-MRI fusion molecular imaging device for neuro-molecular imaging.

== Education ==
- B.Sc., Electronics, College of Engineering, Seoul National University, Seoul, Korea (1960)
- M.Sc. Electronics, Graduate School, Seoul National University, Seoul, Korea (1962)
- Ph.D. Applied Physics, Institute of Physics, Uppsala university, Uppsala, Sweden (1966)
- Fil.D (Docent). Nuclear Physics, Institute of Physics, Stockholm University, Stockholm, Sweden (1972)

== Career ==
2019.11.–Present Endowed Chair Professor & Director, Neuroscience Convergence Center, Korea University, Seoul, Korea.
2017–2019.10 Endowed Chair Professor & Director, Neuroscience Research Institute, University of Suwon, Suwon, Korea.
2015–Present Distinguished Research Fellow, Advanced Institutes of Convergence technology (AICT), Seoul National University, Seoul, Korea.
2004–2014 University Professor, Neuroscience Research Institute, Gachon Medical School, Inchon, Korea.
2006–Present Professor Emeritus, Radiological Sciences and Psychiatry and Human Behavior, University of California, Irvine School of Medicine
1985–2006 Professor, Radiological Sciences and Psychiatry and Human Behavior, University of California, Irvine School of Medicine
1995–1997 Visiting Endowed Chair Professor, Korea Advanced Institute of Science and Technology, Seoul, Korea.
1979–1994 Professor, Korea Advanced Institute of Science and Technology, Seoul, Korea.
1979–1985 Professor of Radiology (Physics) and Co-Director of Imaging Research Center, Columbia University, New York, USA
1972–1978 Associate Research Physicist and Adjunct Assoc. Professor, Applied Science & Engineering, University of California, Los Angeles, USA
1972–1976 Associate Professor (Docent) of Physics, Institute of Physics, University of Stockholm, Stockholm, Sweden.
1970–1971 Visiting Scientist, Wallenberg Fellow, Brookhaven National Laboratory, Upton, Long Island, New York, USA
1966–1971 Research Staff, Swedish Atomic Research Council, Institute of Physics, University of Stockholm, Sweden.

== Other posts ==
- Editor in Chief, International Journal of Imaging Systems & Technology, John Wiley & Sons, New York, N.Y., 1993–2011
  Editorial Board: Magnetic Resonance in Medicine, Academic Press, San Diego, New York, 1984–90
  Steering Committee IEEE Trans. on Medical Imaging, IEEE Press, New York, NY, 1985–93
  Steering Committee: IEEE Trans. on Nuclear Science, IEEE Press, New York, NY, 1985–92
  Editorial Board: Computerized Medical Imaging and Graphics, Pergamon Press, New York, NY, 1988-
  Editorial Board: Physics in Medicine and Biology, Institute of Physics, London, England, 1993
  Editorial Board: International Journal of Imaging Systems and Technology, John Wiley & Sons, New York, NY, 1989–93

== Published works ==
- Cho, ZH., Chan, JK. and Eriksson, L., "Circular ring transverse axial positron camera for 3-D reconstruction of radionuclides distribution", IEEE Trans Nucl. Sci, NS-23, 613–622, 1976.
- Cho, ZH., Eriksson, L. and Chan, JK. "A circular ring transverse axial positron camera“ in Reconstruction Tomography in Diagnostic Radiology and Nuclear Medicine Symposium, Puerto Rico, April 1975, and book “ Diagnostic Radiology and Nuclear Medicine”, 393–421, 1977, University Park Press, Baltimore(Ed. by Ter-Pogossian et al.).
- Cho, ZH. and Farukhi, MR., "Bismuth Germanate (BGO) as a potential scintillation detector in positron cameras", J Nucl Med, 18, 840–844, 1977.
- Z.H. Cho, J. Jones, and M. Singh; Foundation of Medical Imaging ( John Wiley & Sons ), 1993, New York, USA
- Cho, ZH, Y.D. Son, H.K. Kim, K.N. Kim, S.H. Oh, J.Y. Han, I. K. Hong, and Y. B Kim. A fusion PET-MRI system with a high- resolution research tomography-PET and ultra high field 7.0 T-MRI for the molecular-genetic imaging of the brain. Proteomic, Vol. 8, No. 6, 1302–1323, 2008
- Book : 7 Tesla MRI Brain Atlas- In-vivo Atlas with Cryomacrotome Correlation (Springer, New York, Dordrecht, Heidelberg, London), 2009
- Z. H. Cho (Editor); 7 Tesla MRI Brain Atlas – In-vivo Atlas with Cryomacrotome Correlation (Springer, New York, Dordrecht, Heidelberg, London) 2009

=== Technical Reports ===
1. Cho ZH, General Views on 3-D Image Reconstruction and Computerized Transverse Axial Tomography. IEEE Trans. Nucl. Sci. NS-21, No. 3, 1974.
2. Cho, ZH. and Ahn, I., "Computer algorithm for tomographic image reconstruction with x-ray transmission scan", Computer in Biomedical Res, 8, 8, 1974.
3. Cho, ZH., Chan, JK., Eriksson, L., Singh, M., Graham, S., Macdonald, WS. and Yano, Y., "Positron ranges obtained form biomedically important positron emitting radionuclides", J Nucl Med, 16, 1174–1176, 1975.
4. Cho, ZH., Chan, JK. and Eriksson, L., "Circular ring transverse axial positron camera for 3-D reconstruction of radionuclides distribution", IEEE Trans Nucl Sci, NS-23, 613–622, 1976.
5. Cho, ZH., Cohen, MB., Singh, M., Chan, J., Eriksson, L., Spolter, L. and MacDonald, NS., "Performance and evaluation of a circular ring transverse axial positron camera", IEEE Trans Nucl Sci, NS-24, 532–542, 1977.
6. Cho, ZH., Eriksson, L. and Chan, JK., "A circular ring transverse axial positron camera" in Reconstruction Tomography in Diagnostic Radiology and Nuclear Medicine Symposium, Puerto Rico, April 1975, and in the book “ Diagnostic Radiology and Nuclear Medicine”, 393–421, 1977, University Park Press, Baltimore (Ed. by Ter-Pogossian MM).
7. Cho, ZH. and Farukhi, MR., "Bismuth Germanate (BGO) as a potential scintillation detector in positron cameras", J. Nucl Med, 18, 840–844, 1977.
8. Cho, ZH., Kim, HS., Song, HB. and Cumming, J., "Fourier transform nuclear magnetic resonance tomographic imaging", Proc of IEEE (Invited paper), 79(10), 1152–1173, 1982
9. Cho, ZH., Hong, KS. and Hilal, SK., "Spherical positron emission tomography S-PET-I performance analysis", Nucl Instrum & Meth,225, 422–438, 1984.
10. Cho ZH, E.X. Wu, S.K. Hilal; Weighted Backprojection Approach to Cone-Beam 3-D Projection Reconstruction for Truncated Spherical Detection Geometry. IEEE Trans. Med. Imag. 13(1), 110–121, 1994.
11. Cho, ZH, Y.D. Son, H.K. Kim, K.N. Kim, S.H. Oh, J.Y. Han, I.K. Hong, and Y.B. Kim. A Hybrid PET-MRI: An Integrated Molecular-Genetic Imaging System with HRRT-PET and 7.0 T-MRI. IJIST., Vol. 17, 252–265, 2007
12. Cho, ZH, Y.D. Son, H.K. Kim, K.N. Kim, S.H. Oh, J.Y. Han, I. K. Hong, and Y. B Kim. A fusion PET-MRI system with a high-resolution research tomography-PET and ultra high field 7.0 T-MRI for the molecular-genetic imaging of the brain. Proteomic, Vol. 8, No. 6, 1302–1323, 2008
13. Cho, ZH, Y.D. Son, H.K. Kim, S.T. Kim, S.Y. Lee, Je-Geun Chi, C.W. Park, and Y.B. Kim. Substructural Hippocampal Glucose Metabolism Observed on PET/MRI. J. Nucl. Med. Vol. 51. No. 10, Oct. 2010

== Honors ==
Member, The US National Academy of Sciences - Institute of Medicine, USA, 1997–present, Washington D.C. USA
Member, The National Academy of Sciences, Republic of Korea, 1998–2006 Seoul, Korea
Fellow, Third World Academy of Sciences, 1991, Trieste, United Nation (Italy)
Member, The National Academy of Engineering, Republic of Korea, 1996, Seoul, Korea
Fellow, Korea Academy of Sciences and Technology, 1995, Republic of Korea, Seoul, Korea
Fellow, Institute of Electronic and Electrical Engineers, 1982, New York, N.Y., U.S.A.
Fellow, Institute of Electrical Engineers, 1995, London, UK
Member, National Advisory Council-NCCAM, NIH, Washington D.C., USA, 2004–6

== Awards ==
- Distinguished Scientist Award, International Workshop on Physics and Engineering in Medical Imaging; International Workshop on Physics and Engineering in Medical Imaging, March 15–18, 1982, Asilomar, California, USA
- Grand Science and Engineering Award, Science and Cultural Foundation of Chung-Jinki, August 20, 1984, Seoul, Korea
- Jacob Javits Neuroscience Award, (NCI) NIH, January; 1, 1984, Washington, D.C., US
- Sylvia Sorkin Greenfield Award, American Association of Medical Physicist(AAPM), August 15, 1989, New York, New York, US
- Korea Engineering Award (Presidential Award), Republic of Korea, Feb. 28, 1995, Seoul, Korea
- National Academy of Science Prize, Korean National Academy of Sciences, Republic of Korea, Sept. 1997, Seoul, Korea
- Science Prize, The Korea Academy of Science and Technology, Seoul, Korea. Feb. 18, 2000
- Distinguished Faculty Award for Research. Academic Senate, Univ. of Calif. Irvine. January 27, 2004–5, Irvine, California, US
- National Medal of Honor in Science & Technology, Presidential Award, Republic of Korea, April 21, 2005, Seoul, Korea
- Distinguished Alumni Award (Kwan-Ak Grand Prize), Seoul National University, Seoul, 2007
