= Cindy Chao =

Taiwanese jewellery designer

- Born: c. 1974; Taiwan
- Occupation: Jewellery designer
- Known for: First Taiwanese jewellery designer with three pieces of jewellery inducted into three museums, namely Smithsonian National Museum of Natural History in Washington, D.C., Musée des Arts Décoratifs in Paris and Victoria & Albert Museum in London.

Chinese name
- Traditional Chinese: 趙心綺
- Hanyu Pinyin: Zhào Xīnqǐ

Cindy Chao (Chinese: 趙心綺) (born circa 1974) is a Taiwanese jewellery designer. She founded her company, Cindy Chao The Art Jewel, in 2004. She is known for her Black Label Masterpiece Collection and Annual Butterfly.

== Early life ==
Chao was born in Taiwan in the 1970s. She is the daughter of a sculptor and a businesswoman. Her grandfather Hsieh Tzu-Nan (simplified Chinese: 谢自南; traditional Chinese: 謝自南; pinyin: Xiè Zìnán) was an architect who designed temples across Taiwan. According to Chao, it was her grandfather who inspired her interest in architecture.

== Career ==
Chao learned various techniques and skills of sculpting from her father, which eventually shaped her own style of design. In 2004, Chao established Cindy Chao The Art Jewel and opened its first showroom in Taipei. In 2007, she became the first Taiwanese jewellery artist to take part in a Christie's New York fine jewellery auction. Her pieces feature classic 18th century artisan techniques of crafting designs in wax known as la cire perdue (Lost-wax casting). Chaos's pieces are completed using precious metal and gemstones.

Chao's two collections, Black Label Masterpieces and White Label Collection, have been exhibited at art fairs and institutions around the world including Beijing Today Art Museum, Tokyo Mori Art Museum, Biennale des Antiquaires in Paris, Masterpiece London, and TEFAF Maastricht. In 2010, Cindy Chao become one of the first Taiwanese jewellery artists to have one of her designs, an Annual Butterfly, inducted into the Smithsonian National Museum of Natural History.

In 2020, her first annual butterfly brooch the 2008 Black Label Masterpiece I, Ruby Butterfly Brooch, was donated to the Musée des Arts Décoratifs, Paris, displayed in its Galerie des Bijoux.

In 2021, her 2018 Black Label Masterpiece XVIII “Peony Brooch” was inducted into the William and Judith Bollinger Gallery of the Victoria and Albert Museum.

On 17 November 2021, Cindy Chao was appointed Chevalier dans l’Ordre des Arts et Lettres (Order of the Arts and the Letters) by France's minister of culture Roselyne Bachelot-Narquin during a ceremony held in Paris, France.

== Jewellery ==
=== Black Label Masterpieces ===
The Black Label Masterpieces are inspired by Chao's passion for architecture, sculpture, travel, and nature. The limited-edition jewels are created annually, and each piece is named, numbered, and dated.

The 2018 Black Label Masterpiece XVIII “Peony Brooch” by Cindy Chao The Art Jewel was inducted into the William and Judith Bollinger Gallery of the Victoria and Albert Museum. Cindy Chao was commissioned to transform a ruby necklace and chose to create a peony, an imperial flower, which in Chinese tradition would bring good fortune. The gestation of the brooch took place over eleven years. The Peony Brooch is made in titanium and set with 105 oval-cut rubies and dusted with a further 2,380 rubies and 668 diamonds.

=== Annual Butterflies ===
Every year Chao creates one butterfly piece. The first butterfly was created in 2008 and has since been coined as the Annual Butterflies. Each butterfly takes more than 18 months to complete as gemstones and thousands of pavé-set diamonds are set on and around delicately molded wings.

The 2009 Black Label Masterpiece I, Royal Butterfly Brooch, was donated to the Smithsonian Institution National Museum of Natural History's gem collection. The Royal Butterfly is composed of 2,328 gems, totaling 77 carats. The centerpieces of the butterfly's wings contain four large faceted diamond slices stacked atop a pave layer of faceted diamonds, creating a pattern resembling a living butterfly's wings.

The 2014 Black Label Masterpiece I, Ballerina Butterfly, was designed in collaboration with Sarah Jessica Parker.

The 2008 Black Label Masterpiece I, Ruby Butterfly Brooch, was donated by its collector to the Musée des Arts Décoratifs, Paris, displayed in its Galerie des Bijoux. It is the first butterfly brooch created by Cindy Chao and it is made of 18K gold, encrusted with two Burmese rubies totaling almost 13 carats and are surrounded by more than 1,000 diamonds. There are 82 sapphires in the other side totaling almost 2 carats.
