= Zhao family (Internet slang) =

Dignitaries and their posterity in China

the Zhao family
- Traditional Chinese: 趙家人
- Simplified Chinese: 赵家人
- Literal meaning: the Zhao family
Transcriptions
Standard Mandarin
- Hanyu Pinyin: Zhàojiārén
- Wade–Giles: Chao-chia-jên

The Zhao family (Chinese: 赵家人) refers to dignitaries in China, such as the top bureaucrat, the rich, leaders in-system and their offspring. The phrase originates from Lu Xun's "The True Story of Ah Q". In December 2015, an article in WeChat public account described dignitaries as the Zhao family. Immediately, the phrase "the Zhao family" became an Internet meme. Soon after, the Publicity Department of the Chinese Communist Party prohibited the use of such words as "the Zhao family". Medias which have used such words got punished. Accordingly, such words as "the Zhao family" are no longer visible from main websites in China.

== Sources ==
The phrase "the Zhao family" has its origins in Lu Xun's "The True Story of Ah Q," published in 1921. In the story, old Grandpa Zhao (Chinese: 赵太爷) spits out, when Ah Q (who shares the same surname) dares to cheer along with the Zhaos: "You think you're worthy of the surname Zhao?" (Chinese: 你也配姓赵？ Nǐ yě pèi xìng Zhào?)

On December 19, 2015, a public account in WeChat published an article titled "The argument between Vanke and Baoneng: Barbarians in the front, and the Zhao family in the shadow" (Chinese: 万科宝能之争：门口的野蛮人，背后的赵家人) which divided the hierarchical China capital market into four ranks: retail investor, banker, plutocrat and the "Zhao family." The Zhao family is in the highest rank which refer to dignitaries. The barbarians refer to people who are rich but powerless. This article made the word "Zhao family" attract extensive attention.

== Derived usages ==
As the word spreading widely, there have come up derived usages such as "the Zhao family empire", "the Zhao king". Here are some examples:

Original words	Words after deconstruction	Chinese (Simplified)	Chinese (Traditional)
People's Republic of China, Chinese Communist Party	the Zhao family empire, the Zhao family	赵国 and 赵家	趙國 and 趙家
Paramount leader. General Secretary of the Communist Party	the Zhao king	赵王	趙王
People's Liberation Army	the Zhaos' army	赵家军	趙家軍
People's Police	the Zhaos' police	赵家警察	趙家警察
People's Court, People's Procuratorate	the Zhaos' court, the Zhaos' procuratorate	赵家法院 and 赵家检察院	趙家法院 and 趙家檢察院
People's Government	the Zhaos' government	赵家政府	趙家政府
Serve the people	serve the Zhao family	为赵家服务	爲趙家服務
People's Daily	the Zhaos' Daily	赵家日报	趙家日報
National sovereignty	the Zhaos' sovereignty	赵家主权	趙家主權
National Security Law	the Zhaos' Security Law	赵家安全法	趙家安全法
Inciting subversion of state power	Inciting subversion of the Zhaos' power	煽动颠覆赵家政权罪	煽動顛覆趙家政權罪
Chinese people's old friends	the Zhaos' old friends	中国赵家的老朋友	中國趙家的老朋友
50 Cent Party	the Zhaos' spiritual members (not a part of the Zhaos)	精赵	精趙
Oppression in the name of national stability	the Zhaos' nuke/missile	赵弹	趙彈

While having words with 50 Cent Party, some people used "You think you're worthy of the surname Zhao?" as a taunt and response.

== Commentaries ==
- Qiao Mu, associate professor in Beijing Foreign Studies University, said that "the word 'the Zhao family' is a subversive deconstruction in Internet era. We called officials 'People's public servant' whereas in fact they are still dignitaries. There are just princelings in China. It's sensitive to say so frankly, thus people use words like 'the Zhao family' as a taunt."
- Hong Kong Oriental Daily News noted the word expresses both resistance of fake patriotism propagandize and dissatisfied with the fact.
- Hu Ping, the honorary editor of Chinese magazine Beijing Spring, believed that princelings, represented by General Secretary of the Chinese Communist Party Xi Jinping, were now gathering politics and economy resources without restriction, which obviously contradicted with the claim of right in civilians.

== See also ==
- Crony capitalism
- Princelings
