= Chow (surname) =

Chinese and English surname

- Language: Chinese (frequently Cantonese), Old English

Other names
- Variant forms: Cao, Chew, Zhou, Zou

Chow is a Chinese and English surname.

== Origins ==
As an English surname, Chow originated as a nickname, from Middle English chowe, meaning "chough" or "jackdaw".

As a Chinese surname, Chow may be a romanisation of the pronunciations in different varieties of Chinese of the following surnames, listed based on their Pinyin romanisation (which reflects the Mandarin Chinese pronunciation):

- Zhōu (Chinese: 周), romanised Chow based on its Cantonese pronunciation (Jyutping: Zau1; Cantonese Yale: Jāu)
- Zōu (Chinese: 鄒), homophonous with the above surname in Cantonese, though not in other varieties of Chinese
- Qiū (Chinese: 秋), romanised Chow based on its Cantonese pronunciation (Jyutping: Cau1; Cantonese Yale: Chāu)
- Zhào (traditional Chinese: 趙; simplified Chinese: 赵)
- Cáo (Chinese: 曹)
- Qiú (Chinese: 仇)

== Statistics ==
According to statistics cited by Patrick Hanks, there were 1,459 people on the island of Great Britain and 49 on the island of Ireland with the surname Chow as of 2011. In 1881 there had been 19 people with the surname in Great Britain, mainly in Yorkshire.

The 2010 United States census found 17,059 people with the surname Chow, making it the 2,122nd-most-common name in the country. This represented an increase from 15,650 (2,124th-most-common) in the 2000 Census. In both censuses, slightly less than nine-tenths of the bearers of the surname identified as Asian, between three and four per cent as White, and between three and four percent as Hispanic. It was the 72nd-most-common surname among respondents to the 2000 Census who identified as Asian.

== People ==
=== Chinese surname Zhōu (周) ===
- Shouson Chow (周壽臣; 1861–1959), Hong Kong businessman
- M. D. Chow (周今覺; 1878–1949), Chinese philatelist and mathematician
- Chow Chih (周址; 1890–1953), Chinese general of the Second Sino-Japanese War
- Chow Chi-yuen (周至元; 1900–1971), Hong Kong businessman, founder of the Chow Tai Fook jewellery chain
- Chow Chung-cheng (周仲錚; 1908–1996), Chinese-born artist in Germany
- Wei-Liang Chow (周煒良; 1911–1995), Shanghai-born mathematician who worked in algebraic geometry
- Wen Tsing Chow (周文俊; 1918–2001), Chinese-born American missile guidance scientist
- Ven Te Chow (周文德; 1919–1981), Chinese-born engineer and educator in the United States
- Ruby Chow (周馬雙金; 1920–2008), American restaurateur and politician
- Chow Lien-hwa (周聯華; 1920–2016), Chinese Baptist minister
- Yuan-Shih Chow (周元燊; 1924–2022), Chinese-born American statistician
- Chow Kwen Lim (周君廉; 1928–2016), Hong Kong businessman, founder of the Chow Sang Sang jewellery chain
- Chow Chung (周驄; 1931–2025), Hong Kong film and television actor
- Chow Yei-ching (周亦卿; 1935–2018), Hong Kong businessman
- Chow Ching Lie (周勤丽; born 1936), Chinese-born French writer
- Chow Yam-nam (周欽南; 1937–2013), Thai guru
- Michael Chow (restaurateur) (周英華; born 1939), founder of the Mr. Chow restaurant chain
- Chow Kwai Lam (周贵林; 1942–2018), Malaysian footballer
- Esther Ngan-ling Chow (周顏玲; born 1943), Chinese-born sociologist in the United States
- Louise Chow (周芷; born 1943), Chinese-born biochemistry professor in the United States
- Selina Chow (周梁淑怡; born 1945), Hong Kong media executive and politician
- Cheryl Chow (1946–2013), American educator and politician, daughter of Ruby Chow
- Norm Chow (周友賢; born 1946), American football coach
- Chow Kai Wing (周佳榮; born 1947), Hong Kong history professor
- York Chow (周一嶽; born 1947), Hong Kong politician
- Chow Chung-kong (周松崗; born 1950), Hong Kong engineer, former CEO of the MTR Corporation
- Tina Chow (born Bettina Louise Lutz; 1950–1992), American model and jewelry designer, wife of restaurateur Michael Chow
- David Chow (politician) (周錦輝; born 1950), Macau politician
- George Chow (周烱華; born c. 1950), Hong Kong-born Canadian politician
- Chow Kim Hoong (周剑雄; 1950–1973), Malaysian-born stateless person and convicted murderer
- Robert Chow (周融; born 1950), Hong Kong journalist
- Ronald Chow (周美德; born 1951), Hong Kong politician
- Christine Chow Ma (周美青; born 1952), Hong Kong-born wife of former Republic of China president Ma Ying-jeou
- Stephen Chow Chun-kay (周振基; born 1954), Hong Kong businessman
- Jennifer Chow (周潔冰; born 1955), Hong Kong politician
- Chow Yun-fat (周潤發; born 1955), Hong Kong film actor
- Chow Wai-keung (周偉強; born c. 1957), Hong Kong social worker and politician
- Billy Chow (周比利; born 1958), Hong Kong film actor and kickboxer
- Raymond "Shrimp Boy" Chow (周國祥; born 1959), Hong Kong-born organized crime boss in San Francisco
- Michael Chow (actor) (周文健; born 1960), Hong Kong actor
- Stephen Chow (周星馳; born 1962), Hong Kong film actor and director
- Kathy Chow (周海媚; born 1966), Chinese actress and singer
- Vivian Chow (周慧敏; born 1967), Hong Kong actress and singer
- Valerie Chow (周嘉玲; born 1970), Hong Kong actress and fashion publicist
- Angela Chow (周瑛琦; born 1972), Taiwan-born Canadian actress
- Chow Tsz Ki (周梓琪; born 1972), Hong Kong fencer
- China Chow (born 1974), British actress, daughter of restaurateur Michael Chow
- Wave Chow (周榮佳; born 1975), Hong Kong newspaper columnist
- Amy Chow (周婉儀; born 1978), American gymnast who competed in the 1996 and 2000 Summer Olympics
- Duncan Chow (周群達; born 1978), Hong Kong actor
- Endy Chow (周國賢; born 1979), Hong Kong singer
- Holden Chow (周浩鼎; born 1979), Hong Kong solicitor and actor
- Niki Chow (周勵淇; born 1979), Hong Kong actress and singer
- Chow Chun Fai (周俊輝; born 1980), Hong Kong artist
- Chow Ho-Wan (周浩雲; born 1982), Hong Kong racing rider
- Janet Chow (周家蔚; born 1983), Hong Kong actress
- Crystal Chow (周澄; born 1986), Hong Kong activist
- Edward Ka-yin Chow (周嘉賢; born 1987), Hong Kong figure skater
- Lori Chow (周美欣; born 1988), Canadian-born Hong Kong fashion model
- Chow Cheuk Fung (周綽豐; born 1989), Hong Kong footballer
- Alex Chow (周永康; born 1990), Hong Kong activist
- Tim Chow (周定洋; born 1994), British footballer who played for Chinese Taipei at the international level
- Agnes Chow (周庭; born 1996), Hong Kong activist
- Rey Chow (周蕾; fl. 1980s–present), Hong Kong-born cultural critic

=== Chinese surname Zōu (鄒) ===
- Edmund Chow (鄒偉雄; born 1925), Hong Kong lawyer
- Raymond Chow (鄒文懷; 1927–2018), Hong Kong film producer and executive
- Gregory Chow (鄒至莊; born 1930), Chinese-born American economist
- Olivia Chow (鄒至蕙; born 1957), Hong Kong–born Canadian politician
- Matt Chow (鄒凱光; born 1968), Hong Kong screenwriter
- Chow Ka Wa (鄒嘉華; born 1986), Hong Kong footballer
- Chow Kwong Wing (鄒廣榮; born 1986), Hong Kong rower
- Chow Mei Kuan (鄒美君; born 1994), Malaysian badminton player

=== Chinese surname Zhào (趙) ===
- Stefen Chow (赵峰; born 1980), Malaysian photographer
- Jun Yi Chow (赵俊毅), Malaysian composer

=== Chinese surname Cáo (曹) ===
- Raymond Chow (artist) (曹惠文; born 1941), Canadian artist
- Chow Kon Yeow (曹观友; born 1958), Malaysian politician

=== Chinese surname Qiáo (喬) ===
- Liang Chow (乔良; born 1968), Chinese artistic gymnast

=== Chinese surname Qiú (仇) ===
- Chow Chee Keong (仇志強; 1948–2018), Malaysian-born football goalkeeper in Hong Kong

=== Other ===
People with other surnames spelt Chow, or for whom the Chinese characters of their names are unavailable:

- Gin Chow (1857–1933), Chinese immigrant fortune teller in California
- Bob Chow (1907–2003), American sports shooter
- William Kwai Sun Chow (1914–1987), American martial artist
- Chow Shiu-hung (born 1935), Hong Kong-born footballer who competed internationally for the Republic of China
- Chow Kwong Choi (born 1943), Hong Kong cyclist, twin brother of Chow Kwong Man
- Chow Kwong Man (born 1943), Hong Kong cyclist, twin brother of Chow Kwong Choi
- Lucas Chow (born c. 1953), Singaporean media executive
- Jade Chow Wei Mun (born 1957), Malaysian physician
- Chow Tai Ming (born 1959), Hong Kong cyclist
- Helen Chow (born 1965), Malaysian swimmer
- Anne Chow (born 1966), American business executive
- Chow Lai Yee (born 1967), Hong Kong swimmer
- Johny Chow (born John Mark Bechtel, 1972), American guitarist
- Stanley Chow (born 1974), British illustrator
- Felice Chow (born 1977), Trinidad and Tobago rower
- Winston Chow (born 1977), American activist
- Kelsey Chow (born 1991), American actress
- Chi-Ming Chow (fl. 1990–present), Canadian cardiologist
- Deborah Chow (fl. 2000s–present), Australian-born Canadian filmmaker
- Edmond Chow (fl. 2000s–present), American computer scientist
- Jack Chow, American professor of public health
- Jennifer Chow (novelist), American novelist
- Jerry M. Chow, American physicist
- K. Victor Chow, American finance professor
- May Chow, Canadian chef
- Peter Sienpin Chow, electrical engineer in the United States
- Yucho Chow (fl. 1905–1949), Canadian photographer

== Fictional characters ==
- David Chow (The Young and the Restless)
- Kai-Lan Chow, a female Chinese-American character voiced by Jade-Lianna Peters in Ni Hao, Kai-Lan
- Leslie Chow, a character played by Ken Jeong in The Hangover Trilogy
