= Stephen Chow (disambiguation) =

Stephen Chow Sing-chi (born 1962) is a Hong Kong actor, filmmaker, and producer.

Stephen Chow may also refer to:

- Stephen Chow Chun-kay, Chinese businessman
- Stephen Chow (bishop) (born 1959), Roman Catholic cardinal and bishop of the Diocese of Hong Kong

== See also ==
- Stefen Chow
