= Raymond Chow (disambiguation) =

Raymond Chow (1927–2018) was a Hong Kong film producer.

Raymond Chow is also the name of:

- Raymond "Shrimp Boy" Chow, Hong Kong-born American criminal
- Raymond Chow (artist), Canadian artist

== See also ==
- Raymond Cho (disambiguation)
