= Watari =

Watari may refer to:

== Places ==
- Watari Dam, is a dam located in Bagwai Local Government area
- Watari District, Miyagi, Japan
- Watari, Miyagi, town in Watari District
- Watari Station (Miyagi), train station in Watari District
- Watari Station (Kumamoto), train station in Kumamoto Prefecture, Japan
- Watari Museum of Contemporary Art in Tokyo, Japan

== People ==
Given name

- Watari Handa (1911–1948), Japanese fighter pilot

Surname

- Cissy Pao-Watari, Chinese artist, businesswoman, and arts administrator
- Daiki Watari (born 1993), Japanese football player
- Hiroshi Watari (born 1963), Japanese singer
- Rio Watari (born 1991), Japanese wrestler
- Takashi Watari (born 1972), Japanese former footballer
- Tetsuya Watari (born 1941), Japanese film, stage and television actor
- Wataru Watari (born 1987), Japanese light novel author

Fictional characters

- Watari (Death Note), a character in the manga series Death Note

== Other uses ==
- Watari (manga), a Japanese manga series by Sanpei Shirato and the 1966 tokusatsu film
- Watari-kun's ****** Is About to Collapse, a Japanese manga series
