= Zhou Zhi =

Zhou Zhi may refer to:

- Zhou Zhi (Jin dynasty), Western Jin general
- Louise Chow or Zhou Zhi, Taiwanese scientist
- Chow Chih, Chinese general in the National Revolutionary Army

== See also ==
- Zhouzhi County
