= Bronze Bauhinia Star =

Hong Kong service award

Bronze Bauhinia Star 銅紫荊星章
- Awarded for: outstanding service over a long period of time, but in a more limited field or way than that required for the Silver Bauhinia Star
- Presented by: Hong Kong
- Post-nominals: BBS
- Established: 1997
- First award: 1998

Precedence
- Next (higher): Distinguished Service Medals
- Next (lower): Medal for Bravery (Bronze)

The Bronze Bauhinia Star (Chinese: 銅紫荊星章, BBS) is the lowest rank in Order of the Bauhinia Star, under the honours system of Hong Kong, created in 1997 to replace the British honours system after the transfer of sovereignty to the People's Republic of China and the establishment of the Hong Kong Special Administrative Region (HKSAR).

It is awarded to persons who have given outstanding service over a long period of time, but in a more limited field or way than that required for the Silver Bauhinia Star.

== List of awardees ==
=== 1998 ===
- Prof. WONG Hoi-kwok, BBS, JP
- Mr CHOW Chun-fai, BBS, JP
- Mrs WONG LEUNG Kam-shan, BBS
- Mrs Mary SZETO, BBS
- Mr NG Sze-fuk, BBS, JP
- Mr NG See-yuen, BBS
- Mr LEE Lin-sang, BBS
- Mr NG Pang-lin, Benny, BBS
- Mr HO Hei-wah, BBS
- Mr LEE Siu-tin, BBS
- Dr LEE Shu-wing, Ernest, BBS, JP
- Mr YAU Che-fai, BBS
- Mrs CHOW SUN Fong-chung, Jeannie, BBS, JP
- Mr WU King-cheong, Henry, BBS
- Mr TSUI See-ming, BBS, JP
- Mr HAU Shui-pui, BBS
- Mr CHAN Tung, BBS
- Mr CHAN Ka-kui, BBS, JP
- Mr CHAN Kwok-wah, John, BBS
- Mrs CHAN Wong-shui, Pamela, BBS, JP
- Dr Andrew William MALONE, BBS, JP
- Mr CHAN Yui-loon, Edward, BBS
- Mr CHAN Kam-man, BBS, JP
- Mr LEUNG Kam-hung, BBS
- Prof. Anthony WALKER, BBS
- Mr TONG Kwok-wah, BBS
- Mrs WONG YAU Sin-yu, Louise, BBS, JP
- Dr Deric Daniel WATERS, BBS
- Mr POON Sing-chi, Stephen, BBS, JP
- Mr TAI Hay-lap, BBS, JP
- Mrs TAI POON Ching-sheung, Joyce, BBS, JP
- Mr KWAN Ting-fai, BBS, JP
- Miss SO Yan-lap, BBS, JP
- Mr Joseph KOO, BBS

=== 1999 ===
- Mr VAN Lau, BBS
- Mr LEE Kwok-leung, BBS, JP
- Mr TO Kwok-wai, Raymond, BBS
- Mr TAO Kwok-lau, Clement, BBS, JP
- Mr CHOW Sheung-loong, Kamuel, BBS
- Dr SHAO Kung-chuen, Daniel, BBS
- Mr FAN Kam-ping, BBS, JP
- Mr SUN Tai-lun, Dennis, BBS
- Mr YUNG Ching-tat, BBS
- Mr Russell John BLACK, BBS
- Mr TSAO Sing-yuen, Willy, BBS
- Mr LEUNG Kong-yui, BBS, JP
- Mrs LEONG WONG Man-suen, Mona, BBS, JP
- Mr CHONG Yuet-luk, Stephen, BBS
- Mr KWOK Kwok-chuen, BBS
- Mr Nicholas CRAWFORD, BBS, JP
- Mr CHAN Wing-kit, Alfred, BBS, JP
- Mr CHAN Lau-fong, BBS, JP
- Mr CHAN Yuen-wah, Alexander, BBS
- Mr CHAN Hay, Henry, BBS
- Mr James Henry WALKER, V
- Prof. T'SOU Ka-yin, Benjamin, BBS
- Mr KAN Tai-keung, BBS
- Mrs LIU TONG Wei-oi, Rita, BBS
- Mr Charles Nicholas BROOKE, BBS, JP
- Mr AU-YEUNG Sing-shiu, BBS
- Mr CHOY Kan-pui, BBS, JP
- Mrs CHUA TIONG Hong-sieng, Judy, BBS, JP
- Mr TANG Po-hong, BBS
- Dr Bryce Nelson DAILLY, BBS, JP
- Mr TSE Tak-man, BBS
- Mr KAN Chung-nin, Tony, BBS
- Mr Robert Charles ALLCOCK, BBS

=== 2000 ===
- Mr LAM Wai-keung, Daniel, BBS, JP
- Mr TIEN Puk-sun, Michael, BBS, JP
- Prof. SHEK Tan-lei, Daniel, BBS, JP
- Mrs CHU YEUNG Pak-yu, Patricia, BBS, JP
- Mr David Chris LEE Tsung-hei, BBS, JP
- Mr KO Kam-chuen, Stanley, BBS, JP
- Prof. LEUNG Nai-kong, BBS, JP
- Mr CHAN Kar-lok, Walter, BBS, JP
- Prof. Anthony Johnson HEDLEY, BBS, JP
- Prof. WONG Siu-lun, BBS, JP
- Ms YIP Yok-tak, Amy, BBS, JP
- Mr Dicky Peter YIP, BBS, JP
- Mr IP Kwok-chung, BBS, JP
- Mr TANG Yat-sun, Richard, BBS, JP
- Dr TAM Man-kwan, BBS, JP
- Dr NG Tor-tai, BBS
- Mr LEE Jor-hung, Dannis, BBS
- Dr LI Sau-hung, Eddy, BBS
- Mr LEE Chung-tak, Joseph, BBS (raised to SBS in 2008)
- Dr SINN Yuk-yee, Elizabeth, BBS
- Mr HAU Suk-kei, Simon, BBS
- Mr ANG Ching-yuan, BBS
- Mr KAI Yau-ming, BBS
- Mr WOO Chu, Thomas, BBS
- Mr James Stephen COOKSON, BBS
- Mr AU Weng-hei, BBS
- Mr AU Wai-hung, Anthony, BBS
- Mrs LEUNG WONG Chau-har, Mabel, BBS
- Mr SHING Wing-chung, BBS
- Mr Vernon Francis MOORE, BBS
- Mr CHAN Wai-nam, BBS
- Ms CHAN Suk-mei, BBS
- Mr CHAN Koon-wai, David, BBS
- Mr PANG Cho-ho, BBS
- Dr FUNG Hon-yuen, Stevenson, BBS
- Mr FUNG Wing-chung, BBS
- Mr WONG Wei-chow, Henry, BBS
- Mr WONG Kwok-chor, BBS
- Mr WONG Tat-sing, Willie, BBS
- Mr WONG Shiu-yuen, BBS
- Mrs LUI TSANG Sun-kai, Priscilla, BBS
- Mrs LOUEY Wai-hung, Kathryn, BBS
- Mr LAU Yue-sun, BBS
- Mr LAI Kwok-tung, BBS
- Mrs SIU TSANG Fung-kwan, BBS
- Mr Richard PONTZIOUS, BBS
- Mr LO Suk-ching, BBS

=== 2001 ===
- Mr YEUNG Yiu-chung, BBS
- Ms TING Yuk-chee, Christina, BBS, JP
- Mr LUI Hau-tuen, BBS, JP
- Dr SHUM Ping-shiu, BBS, JP
- Mr LAM Chun, Daniel, BBS, JP
- Mr Anthony Geoffrey COOPER, BBS, JP
- Dr CHEUNG Bing-leung, Anthony, BBS, JP
- Dr LEUNG Kwok-fai, Thomas, BBS, JP
- Mr TONG Kai-hong, Anthony, BBS, JP
- Dr WONG King-keung, Peter, BBS, JP
- Mr CHIU Yu-hei, BBS, JP
- Mr LAU Man-wai, Joseph, BBS, JP
- Mr LAU Hon-wah, Steve, BBS, JP
- Mr PONG Chong, Edward, BBS, JP
- Mrs SO CHAU Yim-ping, BBS, JP
- Mr Elmo Charles D'SOUZA, BBS, JP
- Mr Senta WONG, BBS
- Mr WONG Kar-wai, BBS
- Mr CHU Ka-yan, John, BBS
- Mrs LEE CHEUNG Wai-mi, Julita, BBS
- Mr David DODWELL, BBS
- Mrs CHIU YEUNG Suk-ching, BBS
- Prof. HU Shiu-Ying, BBS
- Mr Michael Barrie WILDE, BBS
- Mr TONG Hok-yuan, BBS
- Mrs Johanna K. J. ARCULLI, BBS
- Mr Hans Michael JEBSEN, BBS
- Mr LEUNG Fung-shun, BBS
- Mr David J. MORRIS, BBS
- Mr KWOK Shek-kwun, Andrew, BBS
- Mr CHEN Kwong, BBS
- Mr CHAN Chi-kin, BBS
- Mr CHAN Wai-shun, Wilson, BBS
- Mr CHAN Kam-ling, BBS
- Mrs MAK CHEN Wen-ning, Josephine, BBS
- Ms Barbara FEI, BBS
- Dr YANG Shih-peng, Daniel, BBS
- Mr IP Chun-hoi, BBS
- Mr TAM Ling-kwan, BBS
- Mr TANG Kwong-wing, BBS
- Prof. SIU Fung-har, Helen, BBS
- His Honour Judge Richard Neville HAWKES, BBS
- Mr KWAN Chi-yee, BBS

=== 2002 ===
- Mr TUET Che-yin, Ayyub, BBS
- Mr CHIU Chung-tong, BBS
- Mr CHOW Yick-hay, BBS
- Mr LIANG Tin, BBS
- Dr NG Tat-lun, BBS, JP
- Mr LEE Shung-tak, Peter, BBS, JP
- Mr LEE King-chi, Joseph, BBS, JP
- Dr CHOW Po-wong, Christina, BBS, JP
- Mr Roger Grange HARDING, BBS, JP
- Ms LEUNG Sing-tak, BBS, JP
- Dr CHAN YUEN Tak-fai, Dorothy, BBS, JP
- Mr TSANG Man-ching, BBS, JP
- Mr WAN Man-yee, BBS, JP
- Mr YIP Hing-chung, BBS, JP
- Mr AU Kang-yuen, Alex, BBS, JP
- Mr LO Man-tuen, BBS, JP
- Ms SIU Yuen-sheung, BBS, JP
- Dr TAM Wing-kun, BBS, JP
- Dr SAW Thian-aun, Paul, BBS, JP
- Mr SO Hoi-pan, Edinson, BBS, JP
- Mr MAN Fu-wan, BBS
- Prof. TSO Wung-wai, BBS
- Mr Paul Richard BAILEY, BBS
- Mr NG Wai-kit, BBS
- Mr LEE Kwong, BBS
- Prof. LI On-kwok, Victor, BBS
- Mr LEE Kok-keung, BBS
- Dr LI Chung-ki, Patrick, BBS
- Ms SHUM Yuk-kwan, Teresa, BBS
- Mr SHAM Kwong-ho, BBS
- Mr CHOW Chun-kay, Stephen, BBS
- Mr WOO Wai-man, BBS
- Mr YUNG Chiu-hung, Arvin, BBS
- Mr CHEUNG Pak-hong, BBS
- Mr LOH Dai-jur, BBS
- Mr George Colin MAGNUS, BBS
- Mr PANG Chung, BBS
- Mr FUNG Hing-cheung, Kenneth, BBS
- Mr WONG Ching-wai, Andrew, BBS
- Mrs WONG TAI Wai-yin, Lilian, BBS
- Prof. YEUNG Chap-yung, BBS
- Mr YIP Shu-lam, BBS
- Mr LAU Chun-sing, Louis, BBS
- Mr PAU Dak-hei, Peter, BBS
- Mr CHUNG King-fai, BBS
- Mr LAW King-wan, BBS

=== 2003 ===
- Dr TONG Yun-kai, BBS
- Mr CHAN Yuek-sut, Joseph, BBS
- Mr WONG Man-kong, Peter, BBS, JP
- Mr Raj Sital MOTWANI, BBS, JP
- Ms HO On-nei, BBS, MH, JP
- Mr LEE Hing-fai, BBS, JP
- Dr CHOW Kwen Lim, BBS, JP
- Mr WOO Wai-man, BBS, JP
- Ms TSUI Wai-ling, Carlye, BBS, JP
- Prof. LEUNG Tin-pui, BBS, JP
- Dr CHAN Po-fun, Peter, BBS, JP
- Mrs CHENG CHO Chi-on, Mariana, BBS, JP
- Mr SIU Wai-lam, William, BBS, JP
- Dr LO Chi-keung, BBS
- Mr YIN Tek-shing, Paul, BBS
- Dr FANG Zhaoling, BBS
- Mrs Christine WONG, BBS
- Ms Takako NISHIZAKI, BBS
- Mr HO Wing-ko, Peter, BBS
- Mrs NG FONG Siu-mei, BBS
- Mrs LI LAU Wei-chue, Veronica, BBS
- Miss LEE Kit-yee, BBS
- Dr LEE Lai-shan, BBS
- Mr LEE Bo-gon, BBS
- Dr CHOW Chun-bong, BBS
- Ms LAM Shuk-yee, BBS
- Mr SZE Cheung-pang, BBS
- Ms WU Kam-yin, Grace, BBS
- Mr Erwin A. HARDY, BBS
- Mr Peter Ernest HALLIDAY, BBS
- Mr MA Kai-cheung, BBS
- Mr MA Ching-fat, Ricky, BBS
- Mr MA Hung-ming, John, BBS
- Mr CHEUNG Pak-to, Patrick, BBS
- Mr CHEUNG King-fung, BBS
- Mr John HUI Chiu-yin, BBS
- Mr CHAN Pak-ah, BBS
- Mr CHAN Hak, BBS
- Mr CHAN Iu-seng, Star, BBS
- Dr YANG LEUNG Yin-fong, Katie, BBS
- Mr IP Yeuk-lam, BBS
- Mr POON Lok-to, Otto, BBS
- Mr CHENG Yao-kong, BBS
- Mr TAM Lap-yan, BBS

=== 2004 ===
- The Hon. LI Fung-ying, BBS, JP
- Mr CHAN Chung-bun, BBS, JP
- Mr WAN Chi-keung, Aaron, BBS, JP
- Mr WONG Siu-yee, BBS, JP
- Dr TSO Wei-kwok, Homer, BBS, JP
- Mr NG Shui-lai, BBS, JP
- Mr LI Hon-shing, Michael, BBS, JP
- Mr CHOW Wing-shing, Vincent, BBS, JP
- Mr LAM Wo-hei, BBS, JP
- Mr Philip Trevor NUNN, BBS, JP
- Dr LIM Wei-ling, Wilina, BBS, JP
- Mr Anthony Martin HEIGHT, BBS, JP
- Dr David George CLARKE, BBS, JP
- Mr CHAN Wing-sang, BBS, JP
- Mr Roger LUK Koon-hoo, BBS, JP
- Prof. WONG Yuk-shan, BBS, JP
- Mr WONG Chun-shiu, BBS, JP
- Mr YEUNG Kong-hing, Peter, BBS, JP
- Miss WAN Lai-yau, Deborah, BBS, JP
- Mr CHIU Sai-chuen, Nicholas, BBS, JP
- Prof. Iris CHI, BBS, JP
- Dr Sammy POONE, BBS, JP
- Ms CHOI Suk-kuen, BBS, JP
- Mr TANG Kwai-nang, BBS, JP
- Mr Daniel LAI, BBS, JP
- Ms CHING Lai-kwok, Elaine, BBS, JP
- Mr CHUNG Wai-ping, BBS, MH
- Ir YUEN Se-kit, Patrick, BBS, MH
- Mr YAU Chun-ying, BBS
- Mr WAN Kwong-lam, BBS
- Mr MAO Chun-fai, Fredric, BBS
- Dr WONG Chi-ho, Jimmy, BBS
- Dr SETO Wing-hong, BBS
- Dr YAM Yin-chun, Loretta, BBS
- Prof. ho Kin-chung, BBS
- Mr Ng Wing-cheung, William, BBS
- Mr John Y. WOO, BBS
- Dr NG Cho-nam, BBS
- Mr NG Hon-leung, BBS
- Mr Nigel Philip BURLEY, BBS
- Mr LAM Kwei-cheong, BBS
- Mr LAM Hok-po, BBS
- Mr Ian Francis WADE, BBS
- Mr CHEUNG Ching-wan, BBS
- Dr TSO HO Man-yin, BBS
- Dr Thomas Anthony BUCKLEY, BBS
- Miss CHAN Chiu-ling, Ophelia, BBS
- Dr LUK CHIU Kwan-hung, Angela, BBS
- Mr FOO Tsun-kong, BBS
- Dr TSANG Ngai-chong, BBS
- Mr WONG Wing-kong, BBS
- Mr WONG Ting-kwong, BBS
- Mr YEUNG Chiu-sing, Ricky, BBS
- Mr IP Siu-wo, David, BBS
- Mr LAU Kwok-hong, Cletus, BBS
- Prof. LAU Shiu-kwan, BBS
- Prof. TAM Siu-lun, John, BBS
- Mr Georges LEGROS, BBS
- Mr LO Wing-hung, BBS
- Mr YAN Hui-chang, Hubert, BBS
- Mr TAI Tung-ngok, BBS
- Mr CHUNG Wah-nan, BBS
- Prof. CHUNG Yip-wah, BBS

=== 2005 ===
- Mr Kennedy WONG Ying-ho, BBS, JP
- Ms MAR Yuet-har, BBS, MH
- Dr WU Po-him, Philip, BBS, JP
- Mr YU Kam-kee, Lawrence, BBS, JP
- Dr LI Sze-bay, Albert, BBS, MBE, JP
- Mr FAN Chor-ho, Paul, BBS, JP
- Prof. FAN Yiu-kwan, BBS, JP
- Mr MA Ching-yuk, BBS, JP
- Dr KWOK Kin-fun, Joseph, BBS, JP
- Prof. CHAN Yuk-shee, BBS, JP
- Mr CHAN Pun-chung, BBS, JP
- Ms CHAN Ching-har, Eliza, BBS, JP
- Mr MAK Kin-lam, BBS, JP
- Mr CHOI Chi-wa, Augustine, BBS, JP
- Mrs CHENG CHAN Ching-ling, BBS, JP
- Mr LAI Sze-nuen, BBS, JP
- Prof. LO King-man, BBS, JP
- Mrs PEI CHEN Chi-kuen, Delia, BBS, JP
- Revd SIK Chi-wai, BBS
- Mr WONG Kwun, BBS, MH
- Mr CHOW Yin-sum, BBS, MH
- Mr LEUNG Chung-wan, BBS, MH
- Mr YAU Sai-yan, Simon, BBS
- Mr WU Lang-meng, Anthony, BBS
- Mr LEE Man-chun, Raymond, BBS
- Mr LAM Kar-sing, BBS
- Mr HUNG Cho-shing, Crucindo, BBS
- Mr HUNG Chi-pai, BBS
- Mr CHAN Wing-kin, Alfred, BBS
- Mr Henry TAN, BBS
- Mr CHAN Wing-chan, BBS
- Mr CHAN Yiu-chong, Christopher, BBS
- Mr Harry MACLEOD, BBS
- Mrs FUNG CHAN Chiou-min, Clara Ann, BBS
- Ms YEUNG Chi-hung, BBS
- Mr YOUNG Kak-sun, Edmund, BBS
- Dr LAU Wai-mai, Michael, BBS
- Dr TSE Tak-fu, BBS

=== 2006 ===
- Mr YAU How-boa, Stephen, BBS, MH, JP
- Mrs CHOR CHAN Chui-yuk, Jennie, BBS, JP
- Dr SHING Shiu-ching, Elizabeth, BBS, JP
- Mrs NG CHU Lien-fan, BBS, JP
- Mr LAM Tai-fai, BBS, JP
- Mr SUN Kai-lit, Cliff, BBS, JP
- Mrs Anne MARDEN, BBS, JP
- Mr HUI Yung-chung, BBS, JP
- Prof. CHAN Cheung-ming, Alfred, BBS, JP
- Mr FUNG Kwong-chung, BBS, JP
- Mr YIP Wah, BBS, JP
- Mr TSOI Hak-kong, Herbert, BBS, JP
- Ms Teresa CHENG Yeuk-wah, BBS, SC, JP
- Mr LO Wing-sang, Vincent, BBS, JP
- Mr HIEW Chin, BBS, MH
- Mr CHEUNG Fo-tai, BBS, MH
- Mr POON Fat-lam, BBS, MH
- Mr SO Sai-chi, BBS, MH
- Dr WONG Kam-din, Andy, BBS
- Mr CHU Chung-shing, BBS, MH
- Mr LEE Kwong-lam, BBS, MH
- Mr LO Kwok-hung, BBS., MH
- Mr Suresh MANSUKHANI, BBS
- Mr Eddie WANG, BBS
- Mrs Cissy PAO-WATARI, BBS
- Mr SHEK Hon-kei, Simon, BBS
- Mr CHU Ka-lok, Peter, BBS
- Mr KONG Kai-ming, BBS
- Mrs LEE HO Yuk-hing, Alice, BBS
- Mrs LEE YIP Wai-kay, Cecilia, BBS
- Prof. TO Cho-yee, BBS
- Mr TO Wai-keung, Vincent, BBS
- Mr CHAU Cham-chiu, Peter, BBS
- Mr CHOW Yung, Robert, BBS
- Mr SUN Tak-kei, David, BBS
- Mr KWOK Hing-wai, Kenneth, BBS, SC
- Ms CHAN Shun-kit, Kittie, BBS
- Mr CHAN Wai-ming, BBS
- Miss CHAN Sui-ching, Iris, BBS
- Mr MAK Kwok-wah, BBS
- Mr Rusy Motabhoy SHROFF, BBS
- Mr TONG Wing-shing, BBS
- Mrs FUNG MA Kit-han, Jenny, BBS
- Mr WONG Kwok-kin, BBS
- Dr HWANG Shu-tak, James, BBS
- Mr LAU Siu-hong, Freeman, BBS
- Mr Lai Ip-cheung, BBS

=== 2007 ===
- Mr WONG Kai-man, BBS, JP
- Dr CHOI Koon-shum, Jonathan, BBS, JP
- Mr CHAN Tak-chor, BBS, MH, JP
- Mr LI Yiu-ban, BBS, MH, JP
- Ms CHEN Sheau-ling, Cecilia Daisy, BBS, MH, JP
- Mr YU Shiu-tin, Paul, BBS, JP
- Mr LEE Chung-keung, Eddie, BBS, JP
- Ms LEE Wai-yin, Angela, BBS, JP
- Mr TIK Chi-yuen, BBS, JP
- Mr LAM Kwok-cheong, Alfred, BBS, JP
- Mr CHAN Tze-ching, Ignatius, BBS, JP
- Mr CHEN Cheng-jen, Clement, BBS, JP
- Dr MAK Kin-wah, BBS, JP
- Mr WONG Kai-man, BBS, JP
- Mr Carson WEN, BBS, JP
- Revd LAU Wai-ling, Dorothy, BBS, JP
- Mr LO Sui-on, BBS, JP
- Mr TAM Kuen-chong, BBS, JP
- Mr KAN Chi-ho, BBS, MH
- Mr SHING Yuen-hing, BBS, MH
- Mrs LING LAU Yuet-fun, Laura, BBS, MH
- Mr LEUNG Ying-piu, BBS, MH
- Mr KO Tam-kan, BBS
- Mr WONG Kam-fai, BBS, MH
- Mr YUE Yun-hing, BBS, MH
- Mr WONG Kam-po, BBS, MH
- Mr YEUNG Koon-yat, BBS, MH
- Ms Jean M. WONG, BBS
- Dr WONG Cho-yiu, Peter, BBS
- Mr WUCIUS Wong, BBS
- Mrs Louise MON, BBS
- Mr LAM Hei-chung, BBS
- Mrs MA LO To-wan, Mary, BBS
- Mr CHEUNG Ming-bor, Rupert, BBS
- Mr CHAN Cho-biu, BBS
- Mr CHAN Fook-lai, BBS
- Mr CHAN Chi-choi, BBS
- Mr CHAN Cheuk, Christopher, BBS
- Mr PANG Kwok-lam, BBS
- Mr TSANG Kin-woo, BBS
- Mr WONG Shun-sang, BBS
- Mr WONG Fu-wing, Dick, BBS
- Prof. YOUNG Chien-ming, Enoch, BBS
- Mr LAU Kam-kwok, Andy, BBS
- Mrs CHOI LEUNG Yuen-mei, Joanna, BBS
- Mr CHIA Chun-heng, Benny, BBS
- Mr TAM Pui-suen, BBS

=== 2008 ===
- Mr TONG Wai-ki, BBS, MH
- Prof. YUEN TSANG Woon-ki, Angelina, BBS, JP
- Mr CHOW Cheuk-yu, Alfred, BBS, JP
- Dr LAM Ching-choi, BBS
- Dr KO Wing-man, BBS, JP
- Dr LEONG FUNG Ling-yee, Lilian, BBS, JP
- Mr KWOK Lam-kwong, Larry, BBS, JP
- Dr CHAN Sing-chuk, Charles, BBS, JP
- Ms Vivien CHAN, BBS, JP
- Mr Thomas PANG Cheung-wai, BBS, JP
- Mr WONG Chung-chuen, BBS, JP
- Mr LUI Tim-leung, Tim, BBS, JP
- Dr CHIU Tak-lun, Michael, BBS, JP
- Mr CHENG Shu-ming, BBS, JP
- Dr SO Pik-han, Kathleen, BBS, JP
- Mr SING Hon-keung, BBS, MH
- Mr LEE Chi-fung, BBS, MH
- Ms LEUNG Fu-wing, BBS, MH
- Mr LEE Fuen, BBS, MH
- Mr PUI Kwan-kay, BBS, MH
- Mr KO Kam-cheung, BBS, MH
- Ms Alison CABRELLI, BBS
- Mr ONG Ka-lueng, Peter, BBS
- Miss WONG Lai-chun, BBS
- Mr John Richard READING, BBS, SC
- Mrs LAM FAN Kit-fong, Fanny, BBS
- Mr Kevin Anthony westley, BBS
- Mr CHEUNG Sing-hung, BBS
- Mrs LEUNG Wong Le, Alice, BBS
- Mr LEUNG Tsun-ho, BBS
- Mr CHONG Hot-hoi, Bob, BBS
- Uncle Ray CORDEIRO, BBS
- Mrs CHAN WONG Yee-hing, Jennifer, BBS
- Dr CHAN Tsang-fai, BBS
- Dr MAK Sin-ping, BBS
- Ms FU Kam-lui, Betty, BBS
- Mr YEUNG Shun-kui, BBS
- Ms YIP Chung-man, BBS
- Mrs LAU CHAN Siu-po, Angel, BBS
- Miss TANG In-kwan, BBS
- Mr LAI Hin-wa, BBS
- Mr SIT Tung, BBS
- Mr Gordon William Ewing JONES, BBS
- Prof. NYAW Mee-kau, BBS
- Mr KOO Chee-chow, David, BBS

=== 2009 ===
- Mr SUEN Kai-cheong, BBS, MH, JP
- Mr KONG Churk-hoi, Billy, BBS, MH, JP
- Mr LI Kwok-ying, BBS, MH, JP
- Mr HUI Chung-shing, Herman, BBS, MH, JP
- Mr LAU Chin-ho, Stanley, BBS, MH, JP
- Dr LO Wai-kwok, BBS, MH, JP
- Mr Christopher CHUNG Shu-kun, BBS, MH, JP
- Mr FONG Wo, Felix, BBS, JP
- Ms FANG Meng-sang, Christine, BBS, JP
- Mr NG Hang-kwong, BBS, JP
- Ms LUI Wai-yu, Paddy, BBS, JP
- Prof. CHEUNG Yan-leung, Stephen, BBS, JP
- Mr LEUNG Wing-cheung, William, BBS, JP
- Mrs CHAN MAK Kit-ling, BBS, JP
- Mr CHAN Kam-cheung, Paul, BBS, JP
- Mr WAN Yuet-kau, BBS, JP
- Dr LAI Chi-wang, James, BBS, JP
- Mr Steven POON Kwok-lim, BBS, JP
- Mr CHENG Man-yiu, BBS, JP
- Dr LAI Fook-ming, Lawrence, BBS, JP
- Mr KWAN Pak-lam, BBS, JP
- Mr Motwani Kewalram SITAL, BBS, JP
- Mr WU Man-keung, John, BBS, MH
- Mr CHOW Yuk-tong, BBS, MH
- Mr MOK Kam-kwai, BBS
- Mr William KO, BBS, MH
- Mr CHAN Ho-choi, BBS, MH
- Mr WONG Kuen-wai, William, BBS, MH
- Mr LAI Ming, Leon, BBS, MH
- Mr Charles William Cairns BARR, BBS
- Mr LI Wing, BBS
- Ms Nilmini DISSANAYAKE, BBS
- Mrs CHAU LIU Fung-yee, Loretta, BBS
- Mrs Virginia GREEN Suk-yee, BBS
- Mr MA Ching-hang, Patrick, BBS
- Mr HUI Shing-ngai, Raman, BBS
- Mr HUI Hok-chee, BBS
- Mrs KWOK LAW Kwai-chun, Eleanor, BBS
- Dr chiu Lee-lee, Lily, BBS
- Mr LAU Siu-wing, Anthony, BBS
- Mrs AU-YEUNG KWAI Wai-mun, Stella, BBS
- Mr Siu Sai-wo, BBS
- Mrs NGAN NGAN Po-ling, Pauline, BBS

=== 2010 ===
- Mr Li Ying-sang, Tommy, BBS, MH, JP
- Ms CHAU Chuen-heung, BBS, MH, JP
- Ms KO Po-ling, BBS, MH, JP
- Ms WONG Mo-tai, BBS, MH, JP
- Mrs DAN YANG Wing-man, Sophia, BBS, MH, JP
- Mr LAI Shu-ho, Patrick, BBS, MH, JP
- Mr WONG Kau-on, Peter, BBS, JP
- Dr HO Yiu-wah, Anthony, BBS, JP
- Mr NG Ka-kwong, BBS, JP
- Prof. Edmond KO, BBS, JP
- Mrs CHEN YAM Wai-fan, Juliana, BBS, JP
- Mr PANG King-leung, BBS, JP
- Dr WONG Lung-tak, Patrick, BBS, JP
- Mr YIP Moon-wah, Stephen, BBS, JP
- Dr CHIU TSANG Hok-wan, Alice, BBS, JP
- Mr TANG Moon-cheung, BBS, JP
- Mrs LAI IP Po-ping, Fanny, BBS, JP
- Ms TANG King-yung, Anna, BBS, MH
- Mr CHAN Kwok-kai, BBS
- Mr LAU Tin-sang, BBS
- Dr LAM Chi-kit, Lawrence, BBS, MH, JP
- Mr AU Kit-ming, BBS, MH
- Mr LAI Chi-tong, BBS, MH
- Mr LIU Chi-keung, BBS
- Mr WAN Hing-yuen, Anthony, BBS
- Ms Susie CHIANG, BBS
- Mr HO Chi-hoo, David, BBS
- Mr LEE Sam-yuen, John, BBS
- Mr LEE Man Tat, BBS
- Mrs LEE HO Wing-man, Brenda, BBS
- Mr CHAU On Ta Yuen, BBS
- Mr CHEUNG Ming-man, BBS
- Mr HUI Kai-ling, BBS
- Mr CHAN King-cheung, BBS
- Mr LUK Yee-shun, Arthur, BBS, SC
- Prof. CHING Pak-chung, BBS
- Dr WONG Kwai-kuen, Leo, BBS
- Miss WONG Po-lin, Pauline, BBS
- Mr LAU Kai-hung, BBS
- Mr CHEUNG Hing-wah, BBS
- Mrs TAM LAU May-chi, May, BBS

==== Withdrawn ====
Dr LEW Mon-hung was awarded the BBS in 2010 but then stripped of the honour from 3 April 2020.

=== 2011 ===
- Mr KUNG Lin-cheng, Leo, BBS, JP
- Mr LEUNG Che-cheung, BBS, MH, JP
- Ms YU Sau-chu, BBS, MH, JP
- Mr LEUNG Fu-wah, BBS, MH, JP
- Mr YIP Wing-shing, David, BBS, MH, JP
- Mr TANG Kwok-kong, BBS, MH, JP
- Ms LO Yuet-yee, BBS, JP
- Mr FONG Man-hung, David, BBS, JP
- Mr WONG Chun, Justein, BBS, JP
- Mr HO Chi-kai, Nelson, BBS, JP
- Mr NG Kai-ming, Helius, BBS, JP
- Mr LEE Wai-man, Maurice, BBS, JP
- Dr LEE Kwing-hong, BBS, JP
- Mr LEE Luen-wai, John, BBS, JP
- Mr HU Shao-ming, Herman, BBS, JP
- Mr Edward Thomas O'CONNELL, BBS, JP
- Mr LEUNG Yuk-she, BBS, JP
- Dr KWOK Siu-ming, Simon, BBS, JP
- Mr CHEN Chung-nin, Rock, BBS, JP
- Mr CHAN Nim-tak, Patrick, BBS, JP
- Dr MAK Ki-yan, BBS, JP
- Mr MAK Hung-sung, Stephen, BBS, JP
- Dr WONG Chak-yan, Greg, BBS, JP
- Mr YANG Chuen-liang, Charles, BBS, JP
- Mr WAN Man-lung, BBS, JP
- Mr YIP Sai-chor, BBS, JP
- Ms LAU Chiang-chu, Vivien, BBS, JP
- Prof. CHIN Tai-hong, Roland, BBS, JP
- Dr CHING Chi-ping, Roy, BBS, JP
- Mrs CHUNG MAK Suet-mui, Winifred, BBS, JP
- Mr YIM Sen-kee, Rocco, BBS, JP
- Mr CHUNG Nim-cho, George, BBS, JP
- Mr HO Hau-cheung, BBS, MH
- Mr Saeed UDDIN, BBS, MH
- Mr SHEN Jin-kang, BBS, MH
- Mr MAK Yun-sau, Francis, BBS, MH
- Mr WONG Kwan-yu, BBS, MH
- Dr YIP Wai-hong, BBS, MH
- Prof. LIU Yi-chang, BBS, MH
- Mr LO Wan-sing, Vincent, BBS
- Mr TAM Sik-yeung, Joseph, BBS
- Mr WONG Ting-chung, BBS
- Mrs KAM NG Lai-man, Vivian, BBS
- Mr LUI Kwan-yiu, Quincy, BBS
- Ms CHI Hui-ling, Lena, BBS
- Mr CHEUNG Chi-kong, BBS
- Dr CHAN Chok-wan, BBS
- Dr CHAN Kwok-cheung, John, BBS
- Mr WONG See-ho, Anthony, BBS
- Mr YEUNG Kam-kai, BBS
- Mr YEUNG Kam, BBS
- Mr James O'NEIL, BBS
- Mrs SIU SUN Yuk-bui, Yvonne, BBS
- Miss HON Wai-ming, Angel, BBS

=== 2012 ===
- Mr CHAN Kin-por, BBS, JP
- Mr CHU King-yuen, BBS, MH, JP
- Mr LAM Chek-yau, Billy, BBS, MH, JP
- Mr CHAM Ka-hung, Daniel, BBS, MH, JP
- Mr YIP Chun-to, Adrian, BBS, MH, JP
- Mr LAI Kam-cheung, Michael, BBS, MH, JP
- Mr WONG Ming-yam, BBS, JP
- Mrs CHU WONG Lai-fun, Teresa, BBS, JP
- Mrs NG WONG Yee-man, Gloria, BBS, JP
- Mr NGUYEN Van-hai, Tony, BBS, JP
- Prof. LAM Tai-hing, BBS, JP
- Mr KWOK Ka-ming, BBS, JP
- Dr CHAN Chi-kau, Johnnie Casire, BBS, JP
- Mr CHAN Chit-kwai, Stephen, BBS, JP
- Dr CHAN Ka-ching, Andrew, BBS, JP
- Mr CHAN Wing-lim, BBS, JP
- Dr WONG Yau-kar, David, BBS, JP
- Mr WONG Kwok-lun, BBS, JP
- Mr WONG Yiu-kam, BBS, JP
- Ms CHENG Wan-yuk, Margaret, BBS, JP
- Mr CHUNG Ling-hoi, BBS, JP
- Mr KWONG Hing-ip, BBS, JP
- Prof. TAM Fung-yee, Nora, BBS, JP
- Prof. KWAN Hoi-shan, BBS, JP
- Mr LEUNG Kin-man, BBS, MH
- Mr HAU Wing-cheong, BBS, MH
- Mr HUI Ka-hoo, BBS, MH
- Mr WEN Choy-bon, BBS, MH
- Dr CHANG Wai, Julian, BBS, MH
- Mr POON Siu-ping, BBS, MH
- Mr CHOY Tak-ho, Milano, BBS, MH
- Mr YIU Ka-wan, BBS
- Dr HUNG Se-fong, BBS
- Mr LO Fu-wai, BBS
- Dr KONG Tak-ho, BBS
- Mr LEE Tak-lun, BBS
- Mr Stuart Mitchell Imrie STOKER, BBS
- Dr WOO Wing-fai, Vincent, BBS
- Mr WU Wing-kuen, Frankie, BBS
- Mr TONG Sek-por, BBS
- Ms KO Pui-shuen, BBS
- Mr CHANG Juo-hwa, Charles, BBS
- Mr LEUNG Ting-yu, Billy, BBS
- Ms HUI On-wah, Ann, BBS
- Dr CHAN Ping-chiu, Andrew, BBS
- Mr CHAN Kin-sek, Raymond, BBS
- Prof. CHAN Tsang-sing, BBS
- Mr FUNG Pak-tung, Patrick, BBS, SC
- Mr FUNG Tim-chee, Ricky, BBS
- Mr YANG Liang-yee, Philip, BBS
- Mr PAU Chi-leung, BBS
- Mr TSE Cheung-hing, BBS
- Mr Jeffrey Ernest GUNTER, BBS
- Mrs PONG LO Shuk-yin, Dorothy, BBS
- Mr Anthony John LAWRENCE, BBS
- Mr Rafael AHARONI, BBS

=== 2013 ===
- Mr WONG Kwok-hing, BBS, MH
- Dr NG Wang-pun, Dennis, BBS, MH
- Miss CHEN Ningning, Diana, BBS, JP
- Mr KWOK Chun-wah, Jimmy, BBS, MH, JP
- Mr WONG Kam-chi, BBS, MH, JP
- Mr YIP Chun-nam, Stephen, BBS, MH, JP
- Miss LAI Man-man, Lisa, BBS, MH, JP
- Mr SIU Chor-kee, BBS, MH, JP
- Mr CHU Chan-pui, BBS, JP
- Dr LI Pang-kwong, BBS, JP
- Prof. CHAN Yan-keung, Thomas, BBS, JP
- Mr CHAN Yun-cheung, BBS, JP
- Mr PANG Yuk-wing, Joseph, BBS, JP
- Mr TSANG Kam-lam, BBS, JP
- Ir WONG Tin-cheung, Conrad, BBS, JP
- Ms YIP Wing-sie, BBS, JP
- Mr LAU Ming-wai, BBS, JP
- Ms CHOY So-yuk, BBS, JP
- Mr SIU Chak-yu, Simon, BBS, JP
- Dr Jennifer CHOW Kit-bing, BBS, MH
- Miss YAU Tai-tai, BBS, MH
- Mr LING Man-hoi, BBS, MH
- Mr YUNG Chi-ming, BBS, MH
- Mr CHAN Kwok-tim, BBS, MH
- Mr MA Hing-fung, BBS, MH
- Mr CHIANG Tak-cheung, BBS, MH
- Mr SO Wa-wai, BBS, MH
- Mr LAM Ming-sum, BBS
- Mr Malcolm Bruce BEGBIE, BBS
- Dr KOONG May-kay, Maggie, BBS
- Mr WONG Bak-yao, BBS
- Ir NG Kwok-kee, Adrian, BBS
- Mr NG Wai-sun, BBS
- Prof. LI Ka-wah, Michael, BBS
- Mr LI Wing-wah, BBS
- Miss WONG Pui-ming, Cathy, BBS
- Mr TONG Man, BBS
- Mr HA Yung-kuen, BBS
- Mr CHEUNG Wing-yui, BBS
- Ms CHEUNG Ying-choi, Venner, BBS
- Mr CHEUNG Sai-yan, BBS
- Mr TSO Sing-hin, BBS
- Ms LEUNG Po-chu, Jacqueline, BBS
- Mr CHONG Shing-hum, BBS
- Mrs CHAN MAN Yee-wai, Viola, BBS
- Prof. CHAN Ching-ho, Philip, BBS
- Mr Gaylord CHAN, BBS
- Ms FUNG Yuk-kuen, Sylvia, BBS
- Ms FUNG Yuen-mei, Anita, BBS
- Mr CHOW Chi-ping, Charles, BBS
- Dr LIU Yung-chau, BBS
- Dr Darby LIU, BBS
- Ms LAU Ka-shi, BBS
- Dr PAN Pey-chyou, BBS
- Ms CHENG Ming-ming, BBS
- Mr TSE Yung-hoi, BBS

=== 2014 ===
- Mr Tony TSE Wai-chuen, BBS
- Mr LAU Wai-wing, BBS, JP
- Mr FONG Ping, BBS, JP
- Prof. HAU Kit-tai, BBS, MH, JP
- Dr CHEUNG Kin-leung, Ben, BBS, MH, JP
- Mr CHAN Keng-chau, BBS, MH, JP
- Mr WONG Koon-man, BBS, MH, JP
- Ms IP Shun-hing, BBS, MH, JP
- Dr CHENG Kam-chung, Eric, BBS, MH, JP
- Mr LUNG Chee-ming, George, BBS, MH, JP
- Mr WONG Kwai-huen, Albert, BBS, JP
- Mr NG Mang-tung, Bobby, BBS, JP
- Mr HUNG Pi-cheng, Benjamin, BBS, JP
- Mr TSUI Wai, BBS, JP
- Ms LEUNG Wai-fun, Josephine, BBS, JP
- Mr CHAN Yung, BBS, JP
- Dr CHAN Man-hung, BBS, JP
- Mr FUNG Pak-yan, BBS, JP
- Mr WONG Wing-hoo, Billy, BBS, JP
- Miss WONG Yuen-sheung, Ophelia, BBS, JP
- Mrs IP TSANG Chui-hing, Betty, BBS, JP
- Prof. CHAU Kwai-cheong, BBS, JP
- Mr TSE Man-shing, BBS, JP
- Mr MAN Chen-fai, BBS, MH
- Mr LEE Tat-yan, BBS, MH
- Mr CHAU Yin-ming, Francis, BBS, MH
- Dr LAM Kin-wah, BBS, MH
- Mr MA Siu-leung, BBS, MH
- Ms Mariam Maria CORDERO Bibi, BBS, MH
- Mr LAM Kun-so, BBS
- Ms YIP Lai-ching, Carolina, BBS
- Prof. CHE Chi-ming, BBS
- Dr Trisha LEAHY, BBS
- Mr YUEN Siu-fai, BBS
- Mr LAM Fan-keung, Franklin, BBS
- Mr AU Siu-cheung, Albert, BBS
- Dr CHAN Un-chan, BBS
- Mr CHAN Fu-keung, William, BBS
- Mr LAU Chung-ming, BBS
- Mr FAN Yung-kai, BBS
- Ms CHENG Pui-lan, Roxana, BBS
- Mr Peter John POWER, BBS
- Sir Colin Renshaw LUCAS, BBS

=== 2015 ===
- Mr Steven HO Chun-yin, BBS
- Mr YIU Si-wing, BBS
- Ms Alice MAK Mei-kuen, BBS, JP
- Mr LI Tak-hong, BBS, MH, JP
- Mr NG Kam-chun, Stephen, BBS, MH, JP
- Mr CHAN Wan-sang, BBS, MH, JP
- Mr WAN Yuet-cheung, BBS, MH, JP
- Mr NG Chi-wing, Stephen, BBS, MH, JP
- Dr LEE Ka-yan, David, BBS, MH, JP
- Mr SUEN Kwok-lam, BBS, MH, JP
- Dr Anissa CHAN Wong Lai-kuen, BBS, MH, JP
- Ms CHAN Ka-mun, Carmen, BBS, JP
- Ms CHU Lan-ying, Annie, BBS, JP
- Mr Irons SZE, BBS, JP
- Dr YUK Tak-fun, Alice, BBS, JP
- Mrs LEUNG SO Suk-ching, BBS, JP
- Dr CHAN Ying-lung, Ellen, BBS, JP
- Mr MAK Yip-shing, Andrew, BBS, JP
- Prof. WONG Sze-chun, BBS, JP
- Mr WONG Ming-to, BBS, JP
- Ms LIU Chiu-fun, Cynthia, BBS, JP
- Dr POON Cho-ming, John, BBS, JP
- Mr CHOI Ngai-min, BBS, JP
- Mr TANG Yau-choi, BBS, JP
- Mr CHENG Yan-kee, BBS, JP
- Mr LOK Ying-kam, Lawrence, BBS, JP
- Mr NG Kwai-hung, BBS, MH
- Mr CHOW Kam-cheung, BBS, MH
- Mr LEE Yau-chuen, Jacko, BBS
- Mr TANG Hing-ip, BBS
- Mr NG Chak-lin, BBS, MH
- Mr LEE Yin-yee, BBS, MH
- Mr YAI Kam-ping, BBS, MH
- Mr CHUNG Man-chai, BBS, MH
- Ms WONG Siu-wah, BBS
- Prof. Vivian Wing-Wah YAM, BBS
- Mr NG Shung-ching, Colman, BBS
- Mr SZE Wing-hang, BBS
- Prof. YUNG Kai-leung, BBS
- Mr YUEN Kam-wah, BBS
- Dr MA Ching-hing, Stanley, BBS
- Mr CHEUNG Tai-chiu, BBS
- Ms Angela LEONG, BBS
- Mr HUI Kee-fung, BBS
- Mrs KWOK TAM Yuk-ying, BBS
- Mr CHAN Man-chau, BBS
- Mr FUNG Ka-pun, BBS
- Mr WONG Leung-pak, Matthew, BBS
- Dr WONG Man-li, BBS
- Ms CHENG Bo-ling, Justina, BBS
- Mrs SO CHAN Wai-hang, BBS

=== 2016 ===
- Mr CHAN Hak-kan, BBS, JP
- Prof. Leonard CHENG Kwok-hon, BBS, JP
- Mr Ambrose CHEUNG Wing-sum, BBS, MH, JP
- Mr WONG Kin-pan, BBS, MH, JP
- Ms WONG Pik-kiu, Peggy, BBS, MH, JP
- Mr CHAN Yau-hoi, BBS, MH, JP
- Mr LAM Ka-fai, Aaron, BBS, JP
- Mr CHUNG Kong-mo, Edmond, BBS, JP
- Ms Scarlett PONG Oi-lan, BBS, JP
- Mr YUE Kwok-leung, Tony, BBS, MH, JP
- Mr WU Siu-ieng, Michael, MH, JP
- Dr CHAN Kwok-chiu, Alfred Charles, BBS, MH, JP
- Mr TONG Wai-lun, William, BBS, MH, JP
- Mr YEUNG Wai-shing, Frankie, BBS, MH, JP
- Mr Andy LAU Tak-wah, Andy, BBS, MH, JP
- Mr TANG Man-bun, BBS, JP
- Ms WONG Pui-sze, Priscilla, BBS, JP
- Mr LEE Kam-hung, Lawrence, BBS, JP
- Mr YAO Cho-fai, Andrew, BBS, JP
- Dr SUEN Siu-man, Simon, BBS, JP
- Dr LEUNG Sai-man, Sigmund, BBS, JP
- Dr LEUNG Ting-hung, BBS, JP
- Mr CHONG Chong-yip, BBS, JP
- Mr MOK Shiu-luen, Johnny, BBS, JP
- Dr CHAN Kin-keung, Eugene, BBS, JP
- Mr CHAN Ping-fai, BBS, JP
- Dr CHAN Cho-yee, Joseph, BBS, JP
- Ms FUNG Yin-suen, Ada, BBS, JP
- Mr WONG Chun-nam, Duffy, BBS, JP
- Mr YEUNG Kwok-ki, Anthony, BBS, JP
- Mr YEUNG Man-lee, BBS, JP
- Prof. LAU Pui-king, BBS, JP
- Prof. LO Chung-mau, BBS, JP
- Prof. SO Wai-man, Raymond, BBS, JP
- Mr CHAN Kok-wah, Ben, BBS, MH
- Mr YU Shin-gay, Joseph, BBS, MH
- Mr MAN Chi-wah, BBS, MH
- Ms LI Lin, BBS, MH
- Ms LO Tip-chun, BBS, MH
- Mr WONG Fan-foung, Jackson, BBS, MH
- Mr TANG Wai-ming, BBS, MH
- Mr LAM Kwok-wah, BBS
- Mr HO Chang-pong, BBS
- Miss HO Chiu-ha, Maisy, BBS
- Prof. HO Lok-sang, BBS
- Mr LEE Kwan-ho, Vincent Marshall, BBS
- Dr SHAM Chung-ping, Alain, BBS
- Mr CHOW Chun-wah, BBS
- Mr Thomas James MEHRMANN, BBS
- Mr CHEUNG Wai-leung, BBS
- Prof. LEUNG Tin-wai, BBS
- Mr KWOK Tung-ming, Eric, BBS
- Ir Dr CHAN Siu-kun, Alex, BBS
- Mr CHAN Yik-hei, Stark, BBS
- Ms CHAN So-han, Christine Barbara, BBS
- Miss CHAN Yuen-ting, BBS
- Mr WONG Chun-hong, BBS
- Mr LAU Kwong-cheung, Danny, BBS
- Mr HON Bing-wah, BBS

=== 2017 ===
- Ms Elizabeth QUAT, BBS, JP
- Mr Kenneth LAU Ip-keung, BBS, MH, JP
- Mr LAW King-shing, BBS, MH
- Mr SHI Lop-tak, Allen, BBS, MH, JP
- Mr LI Hon-hung, BBS, MH, JP
- Mr KWOK Wing-keung, BBS, MH, JP
- Mr CHAN Wai-lun, Anthony, BBS, MH, JP
- Prof. IP Yuk-yu, Nancy, BBS, MH, JP
- Mr CHENG Man-chung, Daniel, BBS, MH, JP
- Dr SO Chi-ki, BBS, MH, JP
- Mr NG Kwok-keung, Byron, BBS, JP
- Mr NG Wah-kong, BBS, JP
- Mr LEE Kwok-wing, Albert, BBS, JP
- Ir WONG Hok-ning, BBS, JP
- Dr CHOW Pak-chin, BBS, JP
- Dr LAM James J, BBS, JP
- Ms YAO Jue, BBS, JP
- Mr Paul CHEUNG Kwok Wing, BBS, JP
- Ms CHAN Suk-ling, Shirley, BBS, JP
- Mr FUNG Hau-chung, Andrew, BBS, JP
- Ms WONG Siu-wan, Teresa, BBS, JP
- Mr WONG Ka-wo, Simon, BBS, JP
- Mr WONG Shun-yuen, BBS, JP
- Prof. LUI Ting-ming, Francis, BBS, JP
- Mr TSAI Wing-chung, Philip, BBS, JP
- Mr TSE Chin-wan, BBS, JP
- Mrs LAW SHING Mo-han, Yvonne, BBS, JP
- Mr LEE Hung-sham, Lothar, BBS, MH
- Mr CHIU Chi-keung, BBS
- Mr HO Hin-ming, BBS, MH
- Mr YAU Sing-po, BBS, MH
- Miss NG On Yee, BBS, MH
- Miss LEE Wai-sze, BBS, MH
- Mr CHOW Yiu-ming, Alan, BBS, MH
- Mr LEUNG Lun, BBS, MH
- Mr CHONG Kin-lit, Paul, BBS, MH
- Mr YEUNG Wai-sing, BBS, MH
- Dr Alexander NG, BBS
- Ms TAN Chong-chong, BBS
- Miss LAW Fung-ping, Cinderella, BBS
- Dr KAM Pok-man, BBS
- Mr KAM Woon-ting, Keith, BBS
- Mr NG Sui-wan (NG Yu), BBS
- Mr LEE Pak-sing, Simon, BBS
- Mr LI Sing-pak, BBS
- Dr LEE Kai-yiu, Anthony, BBS
- Mr Peter TO, BBS
- Mr LAM Yun-tong, BBS
- Mrs Nancy CHIU, BBS
- Mr LEUNG Lap-yan, BBS
- Prof. LEUNG Koon-shing, Frederick, BBS
- Dr LEUNG Chi-tat, Antony, BBS
- Mr LEUNG Moon-lam, BBS
- Prof. HUI Shu-cheong, David, BBS
- Ir CHAN Chi-ming, BBS
- Ms Katherine CHAN, BBS
- Ir Dr CHAN Hon-fai, BBS
- Ir Dr CHAN Fuk-cheung, BBS
- Mr CHAN Yiu-wah, BBS
- Miss WONG Wai-fun, Stella, BBS
- Mr TSIM Yiu-leung, BBS
- Mr LUI Yin-tat, David, BBS
- The Revd Canon KOON Ho-ming, Peter Douglas, BBS
- Mr CHOI Ka-tsan, Karson, BBS
- Mr LAI Ting-yiu, BBS
- Mr HON Kwok-lung, BBS

=== 2018 ===
- The Honourable CHAN Han-pan, BBS, JP
- Dr CHU Ching-hong, BBS, JP
- Prof. LEUNG Cho-bun, Joe, BBS, MH, JP
- Mr MOK Chung-fai, Rex, BBS, MH, JP
- Mr YIP Hing-kwok, BBS, MH, JP
- Dr LUI Siu-fai, BBS, MH, JP
- Ms LOO Shirley Marie Therese, BBS, MH, JP
- Mr LEUNG Wah-sing, BBS, JP
- Mr LO Wing-man, Lawrence, BBS, JP
- Mr LI Pak-hong, BBS, JP
- Dr LAI Kit-lim, Cindy, BBS, JP
- Mr WONG Tak-wai, David, BBS, JP
- Ms LI Chi-miu, Phyllis, BBS, JP
- Mr LEE Yuk-lun, BBS, JP
- Prof. LIM Wan-fung, Bernard Vincent, BBS, JP
- Dr LEUNG Ming-kuen, Pamela, BBS, JP
- Ir KWAN Chi-ping, Edgar, BBS, JP
- Mr YIM Yuk-lun, Stanley, BBS, JP
- Mr KUNG Pak-cheung, BBS, MH
- Miss YU Chui-yee, BBS, MH
- The Revd Peter John NEWBERY, BBS, MH
- Ms OR Tat-kuen, BBS, MH
- Mr TANG Kam-hung, BBS, MH
- Mr LAW Hang-tong (LAW Ka-ying), BBS, MH
- Father Giosue BONZI, BBS
- Mr WONG Lik-ping, BBS
- Ir HEUNG Yuk-sai, Norman, BBS
- Dr LEE Chien, BBS
- Ms LAM Wai-ha, Olga, BBS
- Mr YAU Pak-hang, Andy, BBS
- Dr CHAI Ngai-chiu, Sunny, BBS
- Mr MA Ho-man, Hoffman, BBS
- Ms KWOK Chi-kit, Judy, BBS
- Miss CHAN Sai-kit, Abbie, BBS
- Ms WAI Ying-hung, BBS
- Mr YIP Wing-kui, BBS
- Dr IP Lai-sheung, Patricia, BBS
- Miss LAI Yuen-kee, Anna, BBS, SC
- Mr LUNG Kim-wan, BBS
- Ms KWAN Ka-ching, Betty, BBS

=== 2019 ===
- The Honourable NG Wing-ka, Jimmy, BBS, JP
- Mr CHEUNG Hok-sau, Charles, BBS, MH, JP
- Ms LU Hai, Helen, BBS, MH, JP
- Mr Manohar Narindas MELWANI, BBS, MH, JP
- Mrs CHOI KWAN Wing-kum, Janice, BBS, MH, JP
- Mr TAI Yiu-wah, Robert, BBS, MH, JP
- Mr CHUNG Wai-ping, BBS, MH, JP
- Ms LEE Sai-yin, Jeanne, BBS, JP
- Ms TO Kwai-ying, BBS, JP
- Mr WONG Man-chiu, Ronnie, BBS, JP
- Mr NG Kwok-wai, Paul, BBS, JP
- Ir LEE Kui-biu, Robin, BBS, JP
- Mr SZE Wine-him, Jaime, BBS, JP
- Dr FAN Yun-sun, Susan, BBS, JP
- Prof. TONG Wai-cheung, Timothy, BBS, JP
- Dr Aron Hari HARILELA, BBS, JP
- Ms KO Yuk-yin, Teresa, BBS, JP
- Ms LUK Wai-ling, BBS, JP
- Dr CHING Cheuk-tuen, Regina, BBS, JP
- Mr CHENG Cheuk-piu, BBS, JP
- Mrs POON YAM Wai-chun, Winnie, BBS, MH
- Mr NGAN Chun-lim, BBS, MH
- Ms TAM Wai-chun, BBS, MH
- Mr NG Chi-keung, BBS, MH
- Mr LI Shing-kuen, Alexander, BBS, MH
- Mr KWOK Chi-leung, Karl, BBS, MH
- Mr CHAN Kin-bun, BBS, MH
- Mr LOW Lock-ming, BBS, MH
- Prof. TING Sun-pao, Joseph, BBS
- Mr WONG Vinci, BBS
- Mr LEE Shing-put, BBS
- Mr LAM Leung-tim, BBS
- Dr LAM George, BBS
- Mr CHUI Wing-wah, BBS
- Ms LEUNG Man-wah, BBS
- Mr CHAN Nap-ming, BBS
- Mr FUNG Pui-cheung, BBS
- Ir WONG Wai-man, BBS
- Mr LAI Kai-sang, Dominic, BBS
- Mr TAI Tak-him, BBS
- Mrs Sally LO, BBS

=== 2020 ===
- Ms PANG, Melissa Kaye, BBS, MH, JP
- Mr YU Chen-on, Emil, BBS, JP
- Mr LAM Man-fai, BBS, JP
- Mr SZE Ching-lau, BBS, JP
- Prof. CHAI, John Yat-chiu, BBS, JP
- Ms TSUI Li, Eileen, BBS, JP
- Mr MA Ching-nam, BBS, JP
- Mr AU Wai-kwong, Elvis, BBS, JP
- Prof. LEUNG Wing-hang, Vitus, BBS, JP
- Mr CHAN Nam-po, BBS, JP
- Mr CHAN Ka-yan, Samuel, BBS, JP
- Mrs WONG YAU Wai-ching, Michelle, BBS, JP
- Mr WONG Kwok, Kingsley, BBS, JP
- Mr WONG Kam-pui, Wilfred, BBS, JP
- Dr LIU Hong-fai, BBS, JP
- Mr CHIU Kwok-kit, BBS, JP
- Prof. LAU Chi-pang, BBS, JP
- Mr TANG Ka-piu, BBS, JP
- Ms LO Wing-sze, Anthea, BBS, JP
- Mr HO Hon-kuen, BBS, MH
- Ir CHEUNG Yan-hong, BBS, MH
- Mr YEUNG Tsz-hei, BBS, MH
- Dr CHU Ting-kin, Kenneth, BBS
- Mr Anthony John HARDY, BBS
- Dr LEE Wai-lai, Margaret, BBS
- Mr LEUNG Kin-wah, BBS
- Ms LEONG Ion-chi, BBS
- Mr MOK Hoi-to, BBS
- Mr CHAN Pak-cheung, Natalis, BBS
- Miss CHAN Fung-kwan, Donna, BBS
- Ir MAK Ka-wai, BBS
- Mr WONG Man-chai, BBS
- Miss WONG Lai-ping, BBS
- Ms IP Fung-king, Fanny, BBS
- Dr TSOI Wing-sing, BBS
- Prof. LO Yuk-lam, BBS
- Mr LAI Hon-chung, BBS
- Mr FORK Ping-lam, BBS
- Ms KWONG Yuet-sum, BBS
- Mr Albert Thomas DA ROSA Jr., BBS

=== 2021 ===
- Mr LEUNG Tak-wah, BBS, MH
- Mr DOO Wai-hoi, William, BBS, JP
- Mr CHAN Wai-ming, BBS, MH, JP
- Prof. FU Hoo-kin, Frank, BBS, MH, JP
- Mr DENG Kai-rong, BBS, MH, JP
- Mr SHUM Ho-kit, BBS, JP
- Mr HO Jock-chu, BBS, JP
- Mr WOO Chun-kuen, Douglas, BBS, JP
- Dr LEE Ka-kui, Elvin, BBS, JP
- Mr LEE Luen-fai, BBS, JP
- Mr TONG Yeuk-fung, Brendon, BBS, JP
- Mr LEUNG Wang-ching, Clarence, BBS, JP
- Mr CHAN Kin-ping, Chris, BBS, JP
- Prof. WAH Wan-sang, Benjamin, BBS, JP
- Mr WONG Kit-lung, Simon, BBS, JP
- Ms YEUNG Kwong-yim, Connie, BBS, JP
- Mr IP Ngo-tung, Chris, BBS, JP
- Ms Ayesha Abbas MACPHERSON, BBS, JP
- Mr SO Cheung-tak, Douglas, BBS, JP
- Ms LAM Yuk-chun, BBS, MH
- Mr WONG Chun-fai, BBS, MH
- Mr CHONG Yam-ming, BBS, MH
- Mr Warren MOK, BBS, MH
- Mr CHAN Kin-yip, BBS, MH
- Mr CHAN Sung-ip, BBS, MH
- Ms FONG Choi-peng, BBS, MH
- Ms TSIN Man-kuen, Bess, BBS, MH
- Ir CHEONG Siu-yau, Ambrose, BBS
- Ms TSE Bing-sum, Magdalen, BBS
- Ms MAN Wing-yee, Ginny, BBS
- Ms Daisy HO Chiu-fung, BBS
- Ms AU Kit-ying, Brenda, BBS
- Mrs HONG CHAN Tsui-wah, BBS
- Miss LEUNG Hing-yee, Odelia, BBS
- Dr HUI Ming-fong, Lilian, BBS
- Mr CHAN Ngai-sang, Kenny, BBS
- Dr PANG Wai-bing, Cecilia, BBS
- Mr WONG Kam-leung, BBS
- Ms YEUNG Chi-lan, Elaine, BBS
- Ir PUN Wai-keung, BBS
- Mr KAN Ka-fai, BBS

=== 2022 ===
- Ms CHAO Sih-ming, Sabrina, BBS, JP
- Mr HUI Wah-kit, Michael, BBS, MH, JP
- Prof. WONG Woon-chung, Jonathan, BBS, MH, JP
- Mr LAU Ka-keung, BBS, MH, JP
- Ms NG Maria Kaiser, BBS, JP
- Mr LI Man-kiu, Adrian David, BBS, JP
- Ir LEE Wai-bun, BBS, JP
- Ir LEE, Sunny Wai-kwong, BBS, JP
- Miss LI Po-yi, BBS, JP
- Dr TSUI Luen-on, Gordon, BBS, JP
- Dr CHUI Hong-sheung, BBS, JP
- Mr CHEUNG Tat-tong, BBS, JP
- Dr CHAN Hoi-shou, Alan, BBS, JP
- Mr CHAN Sai-ming, Simon, BBS, JP
- Ms Phyllis MCKENNA, BBS, JP
- Dr WONG Kong-tin, James, BBS, JP
- Mr YEUNG Yuk-sing, BBS, JP
- Mr IP Shing-hing, Simon, BBS, JP
- Prof. LAU Yu-lung, BBS, JP
- Prof. LAU Chak-sing, Wallace, BBS, JP
- Prof. POON Wing-cheung, Lawrence, BBS, JP
- Ms Jane Curzon LO, BBS, JP
- Mrs KUNG YEUNG Yun-chi, Ann, BBS, JP
- Dr HO Wing-tim, BBS, MH
- Mr LEE Chui-yee, Trey, BBS, MH
- Mr LEUNG Yuk-wing, BBS, MH
- Prof. FENG Jiu, BBS, MH
- Mr Michael Scott TANNER, BBS, MH
- Mr ZHENG Kang-zhao, BBS
- Ms LAI Suet-fun, Betsy, BBS
- Prof. HUNG Fan-ngai, Ivan, BBS
- Ms WONG Hwa-yih, Phyllis, BBS
- Mr LAM Chiu-yin, Dante, BBS
- Mr LAM Lo, BBS
- Dr CHEUNG Chi-hung, Patrick, BBS
- Mr LEUNG Chi-tien, Steve, BBS
- Prof. MOK Shu-kam, Tony, BBS
- Ms PANG Kit-ling, BBS
- Mr WONG Ip-kuen, BBS
- Mr MO YUNG Hon, Tony, BBS
- Mr TSAI Yu-sing, Eric, BBS
- Mr CHENG Nim-tai, Raymond, BBS
- Miss TAI Yin-ping, Flora, BBS
- Mr TAM Chun-kwok, BBS
- Mr Peter William BURNETT, BBS

=== 2023 ===
- Dr the Hon. HO Kwan-yiu, Junius, BBS, JP
- Mr LAM Kin-hong, Matthew, BBS, MH, JP
- Her Honour Judge LIU Yuk-ling, Elaine, BBS, JP
- Mr CHAN Kam-wing, Clement, BBS, MH, JP
- Mr LAU Hing-wah, BBS, MH, JP
- Mr PUN Kwok-shan, BBS, MH, JP
- Ms CHEUNG Pui-lin, Josephine, BBS, JP
- Mr WONG Kwun-keong, BBS, JP
- Mr LI Man-bun, Brian David, BBS, JP
- Mr DOO William Junior Guilherme, BBS, JP
- Mr LEUNG Ka-kui, Johnny, BBS, JP
- Mr HUANG Ling-hang, Lincoln, BBS, JP
- Dr YIP Chung-yin, Daniel, BBS, JP
- Ms CHIANG Chui-wan, Sophia, BBS, JP
- Dr LO Kam-wing, Wingco, BBS, JP
- Mr TSE Cheong-wo, Edward, BBS, JP
- Ms Phyllis MCKENNA, BBS, JP
- Dr KWAN Pak-hoo, Bankee, BBS, JP
- Dr KAM Shau-wan, Sanly, BBS, MH
- Mr HO Tak-sum, BBS, MH
- Dr CHOW Kam-wai, BBS, MH
- Mr HA Chung-kin, BBS, MH
- Mr CHEUNG Siu-keung, BBS, MH
- Dr CHAN Ching-yan, Daniel, BBS, MH
- Dr WONG Chung-kiu, BBS, MH
- Mr YEUNG Fun-bun, BBS, MH
- Miss LAW Kar-shui, Elizabeth, BBS, MH
- Dr TSANG Ho-fai, Thomas, BBS
- Mr MO Sik-keung, Gilbert, BBS
- Mr SHUM Ka-sang, BBS
- Mr WU Wai-hung, BBS
- Dr MA Ching-yeung, Philip, BBS
- Ir CHEUNG Yuen-fong, BBS
- Mr KOK Che-leung, BBS
- Ms CHAN Sui-kuen, Agnes, BBS
- Mr TSANG On-yip, Patrick, BBS
- Mr YEUNG Chun-fan (YEUNG Fan), BBS
- Mr Michael John GREEN, BBS
- Mr POON Shun-wing, Eric, BBS
- Mr Peter DUNCAN, BBS, SC
- Ms YING Fun-fong, BBS
- Prof. Christoffel Hendrik BRINK, BBS

=== 2024 ===
- The Hon. KWOK Wai-keung, BBS, JP
- The Hon. SHIU Ka-fai, BBS, JP
- The Hon. CHAN Chun-ying, BBS, JP
- Prof. TENG Jin-guang, BBS, JP
- Mr CHAN Hiu-fung, Nicholas, BBS, MH, JP
- Mr TONG Sau-chai, Henry, BBS, MH, JP
- Ms LEE Sui-chun, Macella, BBS, JP
- Ms ZHOU Chunling, BBS, JP
- Ms CHIU Wing-kwan, Winnie, BBS, JP
- Mr Andrew Walter Bougourd Ross WEIR, BBS, JP
- Ir CHUI Si-kay, BBS, JP
- Mr CHEUNG Kwong-kwan, BBS, JP
- Mr LEUNG Kin-man, Stephen, BBS, JP
- Ms CHAN Lim-chee, Amy, BBS, JP
- Mr TSANG Chi-ming, Ricky, BBS, JP
- Dr SHU Xin, BBS, JP
- Mr CHOI Wun-hing, Donald, BBS, JP
- Ir KWONG Ka-sing, John, BBS, JP
- Mr PONG Kin-yee, Paulo, BBS, JP
- Mr SETO Yok, BBS, MH
- Mr HO Ngai-keung, BBS, MH
- Ms TSUI Mei-wan, Josephine, BBS, MH
- Mr LEUNG Kui-hoi, BBS, MH
- Mr WONG King-man, Kingsley, BBS
- Mr Apurv BAGRI, BBS
- Mr YU Kin-nam, Allan, BBS
- Mr LUI Yiu-tung, Francis, BBS
- Dr LEE Elizabeth, BBS
- Mr Victor DAWES, BBS
- Prof. SHUM Harry, BBS
- Ir CHAU Siu-hei, BBS
- Mr WOO Kai-sau, BBS
- Mr WAI Ho-man, Herman, BBS
- Dr MA Kai-yum, BBS
- Ms CHEUNG Yi-mei, Amy, BBS
- Mr TAN Tick-yee, BBS
- Mrs CHAN LAI Wai-lin, Winnie, BBS
- Ms YAN Man-wai, Beverly, BBS
- Mrs LAU HUNG Man-yin, Linda, BBS
- Mr LO Kam-lun, Alan, BBS

== See also ==
- Silver Bauhinia Star
- Gold Bauhinia Star
- Orders, decorations, and medals of Hong Kong
