= Jue Yao =

Chinese violinist and entrepreneur

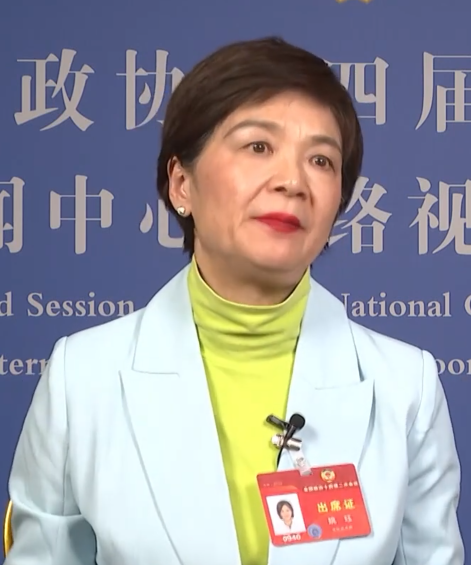

Background information
- Born: Shanghai, China
- Genres: Classical
- Occupations: Violinist, Entrepreneur
- Instrument: 1713 Antonio Stradivarius (Lady Ley)
- Website: www.yaojueviolin.com

Jue Yao is a Chinese violinist and entrepreneur. She is the founder of the Hong Kong Children's Chamber Orchestra and the Hong Kong String Orchestra. She was a recipient of the Hong Kong Ten Outstanding Young Persons Award in 2004.

== Early life and education ==
Jue Yao is the daughter of Di Yao, who was the conductor of the Shanghai Film Orchestra. She started performing at the age of 7 and later followed her father and moved to Hong Kong in the late 1970s, when the reform and opening up started around the same time in China. As a child, Jue Yao disliked playing the violin, and had tried cutting the violin strings to get out of practicing the violin She only started appreciating the violin when she went to the middle school affiliated with Shanghai Conservatory of Music. When she was 16, she was one of the prize winners in the inaugural China National Violin Competition.

In 1981, Jue Yao recorded her first album and became the first violinist to perform in Taiwan, where she was promoting her album. In 1982, she was awarded a full scholarship by the San Francisco Conservatory of Music to continue her violin studies with Zaven Melikian. As a first-year student at the conservatory, she won the school’s concerto competition playing Paganini’s Violin Concerto. In 1988, she graduated with a master’s degree from the Juilliard School of New York where she studied under Dorothy DeLay.

== Career ==
In 2002, Yao founded the Hong Kong Children’s Chamber Orchestra and led the orchestra to participate in the Shanghai Children's Art Festival. Later in the same year, she founded the Yao Jue Music Academy. In 2013, she founded the Hong Kong String Orchestra, which is the only professional string orchestra in Hong Kong, and which was recognized for its “music uniqueness fusing Eastern and Western influences”. Yao has served on the International Jury Panel for the Montblanc Arts Patronage Award in 2003, and was a council member of the Hong Kong Academy for Performing Arts and the Chairlady of the Academic Affairs Committee from 2000 to 2006. She was also a member of the Hong Kong Arts Development Council from 2005 to 2010. She served as one of the University Artists at the Hong Kong University from 2008 to 2010 as part of the University Artists Scheme, which aim was to "bring artists of international caliber to the campus" through a series of activities.

She was recognized by different organizations for her contributions to classical music — the “Outstanding Violinist” by Radio Timeless Award in 2002, the “Ten Outstanding Young Persons of Hong Kong” in 2004, the “Ten Most Successful Women” in 2005, “Outstanding Women Professionals Award” from the Hong Kong Women Professionals and Entrepreneurs Association in 2008, and the “Outstanding Women of the Year” awarded by the Hong Kong Women Development Association in 2012. In 2013, Ms. Yao was appointed as a Justice of the Peace (JP) by the Government of Hong Kong. In 2017, she was awarded the Bronze Bauhinia Star, an award presented by the Hong Kong government for persons who have given outstanding service over a long period of time, for her contributions to classical music in Hong Kong as the founder and artistic director of the Hong Kong String Orchestra. She believed that "it was the result of the relentless efforts of the whole team" and expressed that the award has given her great encouragement to continue to cultivate musical talents and benefit the society of Hong Kong.

Currently, she is on the Board of Trustees of the Hong Kong Jockey Club Music and Dance Fund and serves as a program committee of the Hong Kong Arts Festival. She is also a council member of the Shanghai Political Consultative Committee.

In December 2021, it was reported that Yao was eligible to vote four times in the 2021 Hong Kong legislative election, yielding 0.0366618% of the total voting value (elected seats), which is 7377 times more than the value of an average voter's total voting value.

In fall 2022, Chief Secretary Eric Chan Kwok-ki announces the “Strive and Rise Programme”, a subsidy scheme aimed to help underprivileged pupils expand their social networks, build communication skills, and plan their finances and careers. Jue Yao, along with renowned conductor Yip Wing-sie and Hong Kong Olympic medallists are among the group of mentors in the “Strive and Rise” scheme.

Yao was selected to perform the violen during the 2024 Lunar New Year fireworks display in Hong Kong, as part of a musical arrangement by Chiu Tsang-hei incorporating multiple genres.

== Instrument ==
Jue Yao plays on a 1713 “Lady Ley” Stradivarius violin.

== Personal life ==
Yao is married to Gong Lu, son of the Chinese politician and diplomat Ping Lu. The couple has two daughters.

== Discography ==
- Kreisler: Liebesleid/ Schon Rosmarin (2010). Jue Yao, violin; Vivian Wai Cheng, piano
- Monti: Czardas (2010). Jue Yao, violin; Vivian Wai Cheng, piano
- Paganini: Cantabile / La Campanella (2010). Jue Yao, violin; Vivian Wai Cheng, piano
- Ritzen: Chinese Requiem/ Chinese Violin Rhapsody (2000). Shanghai Philharmonic Orchestra; Peimin Yu, conductor
- Tchaikovsky & Mendelssohn Violin Concertos (2013). Central Philharmonic Orchestra; Lihua Tan, conductor
