= Raymond Cho =

Raymond Cho may refer to:

- Raymond Cho (politician), Canadian politician
- Raymond Cho (actor), Hong Kong actor

== See also ==
- Raymond Chow (disambiguation)
