= Anissa Chan =

Hong Kong educator

Anissa Chan BBS, MH, JP
- Occupation: Chairperson
- Employer: Government of Hong Kong

Anissa Chan Wong Lai Kuen (Chinese: 陳黃麗娟) is a Hong Kong educator. She served as principal of St. Paul's Co-educational College and is Chair of the Task Force on Review of School Curriculum of the Hong Kong Government.

== Education ==
In 1980, Chan earned her bachelor's degree in science from the University of Hong Kong. She earned her master's degree in education from the University of London in 1985 and her Ph.D. in education from Monash University in 1993.

== Career ==
Chan was a chemistry teacher at Ying Wa Girls' School. Then, she became the principal of SKH Bishop Mok Sau Tseng Secondary School for eleven years, subsequently serving as a principal at St. Paul's Co-educational College from 2004 to 2017.

During her tenure at St. Paul's Co-educational College, she made several reforms to the school, including introducing a Rites of Passage programme in Australia, Students' Activities Week and the International Baccalaureate curriculum for senior form students.

After her retirement, she was invited by the government to chair the Task Force on Review of School Curriculum. She has discussed proposals to reform the Liberal Studies curriculum of the Hong Kong Diploma of Secondary Education (HKDSE), by replacing the scale of seven levels from Level 1 to Level 5** with pass/fail. She is a member of the prize selection panel of the Lui Che Woo Prize.

She was named an honorary fellow (榮譽院士) at the Education University of Hong Kong in recognition of her contributions to education.
