= Patrick Se Kit Yuen =

Hong Kong engineer (1932–2011)

Patrick Se Kit Yuen 袁士傑
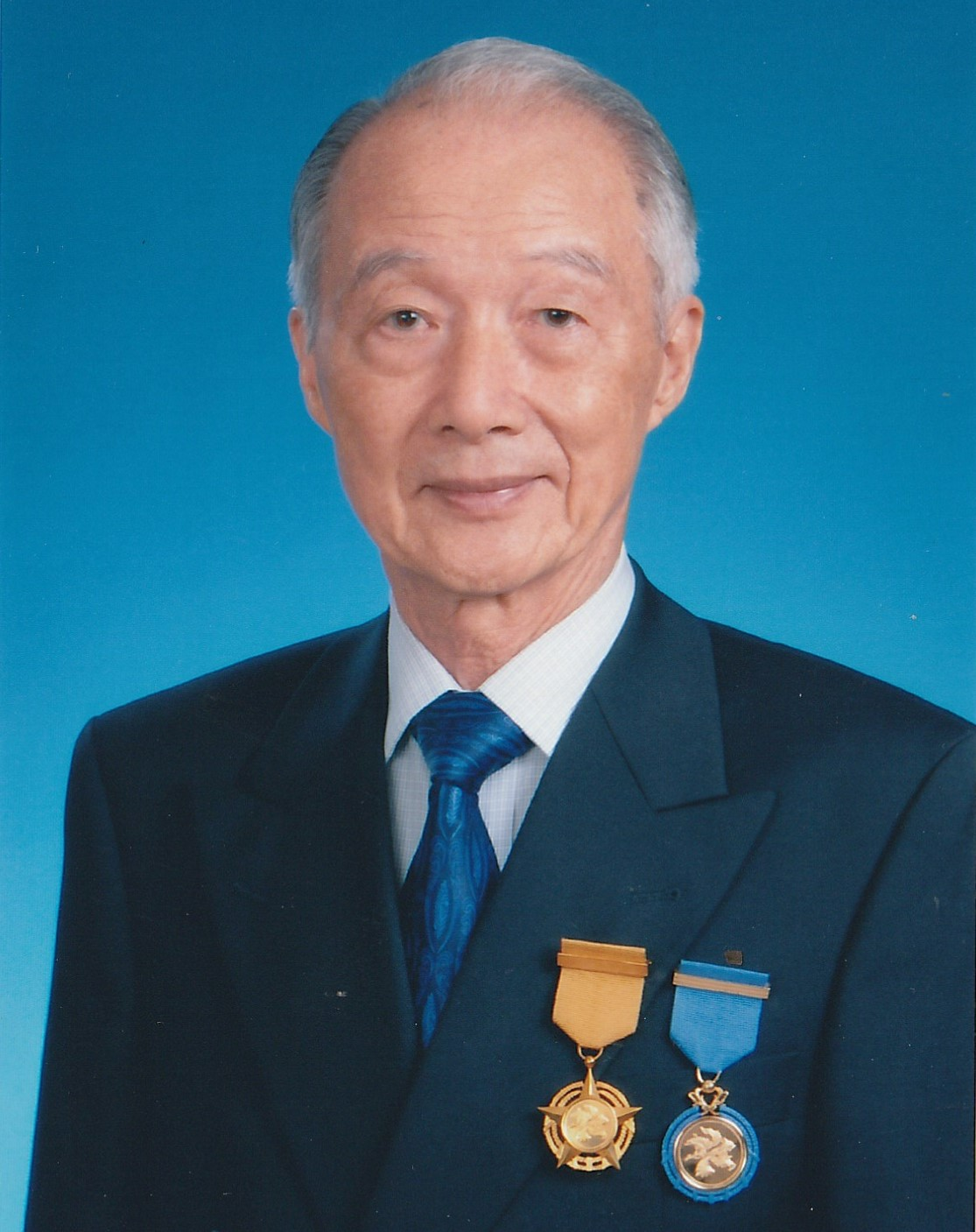
- Born: 6 July 1932; Hong Kong
- Died: 6 May 2011 (aged 78); Hong Kong
- Occupation: Engineer
- Spouse: Sheila Mo Yung Woo
- Children: Three
- Parent: Yuen Ng Tsung

Ir Patrick Se Kit Yuen BBS, MH 袁士傑 (6 July 1932 – 6 May 2011), was a professional Hong Kong engineer, involved in the production and management of industrial gases in Hong Kong and Mainland China.

== Biography ==
=== Early life ===
Patrick Yuen was born in Hong Kong on 6 July 1932 from a well established Hong Kong family. During World War II, he went back with his family to his ancestral home in Xingning in Meizhou, Guangdong Province and returned to Hong Kong after the war. He was educated at La Salle College in Hong Kong and obtained his engineering qualifications in the United Kingdom in the 1950s. He lived in the UK for 14 years and returned to Hong Kong in 1966. Patrick worked as an engineer at Jardines Engineering and later as the works manager in charge of the Hong Kong Oxygen Plant. He married Sheila Mo Yung Woo, daughter of wealthy entrepreneur Seaward Woo and they had three children.

=== Contributions to Hong Kong and Mainland China ===
In 1979, Patrick established New Sino Gases Company with the specific aim to provide an alternative industrial gases supply in Hong Kong. He was one of the pioneers to work in the industrial sector in Mainland China. He built the first acetylene cylinder filling plant in Shenzhen, the first in China since World War II. He pioneered the transportation of liquid oxygen and carbon dioxide from Guangzhou to the Shenzhen and then filling them into cylinders for distribution. New Sino Gases also distributed gas welding equipment in Hong Kong. He formed a joint venture in Beijing to manufacture and market acetylene and other gases. In 1991, Patrick established NSG Technology to take care of investments and business in Mainland China.

Patrick was dedicated to his profession and contributed to the community in Hong Kong. He was active in the engineering and technology sector and served as council member and as chairman for numerous committees of The Hong Kong Institution of Engineers, as Honorary Secretary General for the Association of Engineers in Society, as President of the Hong Kong Association for the Advancement of Science and Technology, as member of HKSAR Gas Safety Committee, as Honorary Engineering Advisor to the office of the Commissioner for Administrative Complaints.

Besides his business and profession, Yuen did not forget his ancestral roots. He served as President of the Yuen Clanmen's Association. He went back to his ancestral home town in Xingning, China on a few occasions and donated generously.

In 1996, Yuen was elected as one of the 400 members of the Selection Committee for the first HKSAR Government. He was Deputy Chairman of the Hong Kong Science and Technology Sector for Celebration of Return of Sovereignty Committee and Deputy Chairman for The Hong Kong Science and Technology Sector National Day Celebration Committee. He also participated in subsequent Election Committee subsector elections.

In 1999, he was awarded the Medal of Honour and in 2004 Bronze Bauhinia Star by the HKSAR.

=== Recognition ===
- HKSAR Medal of Honour 1999
- HKSAR Bronze Bauhinia Star 2004
