= Lo Chi-keung =

Lo Chi-keung, BBS (Chinese: 盧志強) is a Hong Kong doctor and politician.

Lo is a doctor by profession. He is one of the founding members of the pro-Beijing flagship party Democratic Alliance for the Betterment of Hong Kong (DAB). He had held party offices such as the Policy Research Committee and chairman of the New Territories East branch. He was also appointed member of the Yau Tsim Mong District Council from 2000 to 2004. Between 2000 and 2005, he was the vice-chairman of the party.

He had been appointed member of the Administrative Appeals Board, War Memorial Pensions Appeal Board, Obscene and Indecent Articles Panel of Adjudicators, Independent Police Complaints Council. He was councillor of the Hong Kong Baptist University. He was member of the Selection Committee from 1996 to 1998.

In 2003, he was awarded the Bronze Bauhinia Star by the Hong Kong government.

Party political offices
Preceded by Gary Cheng	Vice Chairman of Democratic Alliance for the Betterment of Hong Kong; 2000–2005; Served alongside: Ip Kwok-him, Tam Yiu-chung	Succeeded by Maria Tam
