= Jade Chow Wei Mun =

Jade Chow Wei Mun (also spelled Jade Chow or Jade Wei Mun Chow) (born 1957) is a Malaysian physician, and interested in skin and bone pathology. She is currently being employed by Newcastle University Medicine Malaysia as a Dean of Clinical Affairs. Her previous research has particularly focused on skin and bone pathology, where she has published several articles.

== Career ==
She studied medicine in Ireland and pursued postgraduate studies in London, obtaining FRCPath and a PhD from the University of London. She was Senior Lecturer and Reader in histopathology at St George's, University of London for 26 years until 2014, and also served as associate dean of St George's. She is a Fellow of the Royal College of Pathologists, and Regional Specialist Advisor for Histopathology for South London. She returned to Malaysia in 2014 to join the International Medical University as Professor of Pathology and the Dean of Medical Sciences. She is currently being employed by Newcastle University Medicine Malaysia as a Dean of Clinical Affairs.

== Selected publications ==
=== Books ===
- Jade Chow, John Patterson, Medical Sciences, Oxford University Press, 2012, ISBN 0199605076

=== Articles ===
- Increased insulin-like growth factor I mRNA expression in rat osteocytes in response to mechanical stimulation, American Journal of Physiology, 1995, Vol. 268, no. E318-E327
- Nitric oxide is an early mediator of the increase in bone formation by mechanical stimulation, American Journal of Physiology, 1996, Vol. 270, no. E955-E960
- Indomethacin has distinct early and late actions on bone formation induced by mechanical stimulation, American Journal of Physiology, 1994, Vol. 267, no. E287-E292
- Role of Nitric Oxide and Prostaglandins in Mechanically Induced Bone Formation, Journal of Bone and Mineral Research, Volume 13, Issue 6, pages 1039–1044, June 1998
- Induction of bone formation in rat tail vertebrae by mechanical loading, Bone and Mineral, Volume 20, Issue 2, February 1993, Pages 167–178
- Osteocytic expression of mRNA for c-fos and IGF-I: an immediate early gene response to an osteogenic stimulus, American Journal of Physiology, 1996, Vol. 270, no. E937-E945
- Role for parathyroid hormone in mechanical responsiveness of rat bone, American Journal of Physiology, 1998, Vol. 274, no. E146-E154
- Characterization of osteogenic response to mechanical stimulation in cancellous bone of rat caudal vertebrae, American Journal of Physiology, 1993, Vol. 265, no. E340-E347
- Nitric Oxide Synthase Expression in Bone Cells, Bone, Volume 23, Issue 1, July 1998, Pages 1–6
- Mechanical Loading Stimulates Bone Formation by Reactivation of Bone Lining Cells in 13-Week-Old Rats, Journal of Bone and Mineral Research, Volume 13, Issue 11, pages 1760–1767, November 1998
