= Anne Chow =

American business executive

- Born: 1966 (age 59–60); Missouri, US
- Education: Cornell University (BS, MS, MBA)
- Occupations: Businessperson, electrical engineer, author
- Known for: Former CEO of AT&T Business
- Website: www.theannechow.com

Anne Chow is an American businessperson, electrical engineer, and author who formerly served as the CEO of AT&T Business, the first woman to hold this position and the first woman of color to be named a CEO in AT&T's history.

== Early life and education ==
Chow was born in Missouri in 1966 and grew up in New Jersey, the daughter of Taiwanese immigrants. She started piano lessons at age 4 and joined the Juilliard School at age 10 to study music in their pre-college division. Chow originally considered pursuing a music major, but opted instead for a career in electrical engineering, citing a lack of an "aptitude for mechanical". She earned her Bachelor of Science in 1988 followed by her Master of Science in 1989, both in electrical engineering from Cornell University. She went on to earn an MBA in marketing and operations management in 1990, also from Cornell.

== Career ==
In 1990, Chow joined AT&T in Bedminster, New Jersey, as a network engineer. After working on the technical side of AT&T, Chow attempted to move into sales, and was rejected from five roles over three years before being offered a position. She also worked within operations, product management, and customer care. Chow initiated a mentorship program within AT&T that has helped over 400 women of color achieve career growth and promotions within the company.

In 2019, Chow was appointed CEO of AT&T Business, a business unit of AT&T that provides services to over 3 million business customers and is valued at $35 billion. She was the first woman to hold this position, and the first woman of color to be named a CEO in AT&T's history. The COVID-19 pandemic started a year into her tenure as CEO, driving a surge in business needs and the demands on her global staff. Chow has spoken about experiencing racism towards Asian Americans and bias during her career. She has also advocated increasing the representation of women and people of color in leadership positions. She said that people questioned her appointment as CEO of AT&T Business by describing her as a DEI hire.

Chow retired from AT&T in August 2022. In 2024, she was elected to the board of directors for the CSX Corporation.

== Awards and honors ==
- In 2005, Chow was honored as an Outstanding Woman by the Somerset County Commission on the Status of Women
- In 2021, Chow was named to Forbes 2021 CEO Next list
- In 2022, Chow was the recipient of the Luminary Award from the Diversity and Flexibility Alliance in honor of her commitment to diversity and inclusion

== Selected works ==
- Lead Bigger: The Transformative Power of Inclusion (2026)
