= Wave Chow =

Chinese journalist

Chow Wing Kai, Wave
- 周榮佳
- Born: 1975 (age 50–51)
- Citizenship: Hong Kong
- Occupation: Senior District Director of AIA

Wave Chow
- Traditional Chinese: 周榮佳
- Simplified Chinese: 周荣佳
Transcriptions

Wave Chow (周榮佳)(born 1975, Hong Kong) is a Premier Senior District Director of AIA and a regular columnist for Hong Kong Economic Journal and Economic Digest.

== Writing ==
Wave is a columnist for Hong Kong Economic Journal, Economic Digest, and the ETNet with topics including wealth management, insurance, MPF, team management, sales skills, workplace, and communication. His main purpose is to raise awareness of wealth management for the public through this expertise, and thus make the society more like a 'Utopia'.

He has also published three books in Chinese, which are The Key To Building A 100% MDRT Team, The Soul of Selling and Big Deal. They quickly became bestsellers in Eslite and the commercial press after publications. The first book has also been translated into English, titled Riding the Wave, which is currently sold worldwide in Asia, the USA, Canada, Greece, Brazil and India, in hardback and as an eBook.

== Personal honours ==
- 5th Asia Trusted Life Agents & Advisers Awards - Digital Agency Leader of the Year 2020
- 4th Asia Trusted Life Agents & Advisers Awards - Insurance Agency Leader of the Year 2019
- AIA Grand District of the Year (GODY) - Champion 2019
- AIA Super Grand District of the Year (SGDOY) - Champion 2016
- MDRT Honor Roll and Life Member
- The Hong Kong Insurance Awards 2020 - Outstanding Insurance Agent of the Year
- iMoney Insurance People of the Year - Hong Kong 2018
- GAMA Master Agency Award (MAA)
- LUAHK The Distinguished Manager Award (DMA)
- CIA 500 Chinese Insurance Agency - Double Crown Member
- IDA Manager Category Award - Platinum
- HKMA SME Outstanding Young Salesperson Award (OYSA)
