= Steve Leung =

Hong Kong architect and designer (born 1957)

- Born: 10 June 1957 (age 69); Hong Kong
- Education: Hong Kong University
- Occupations: Architect, interior designer

Steve Leung (Chinese: 梁志天; born 1957) is an architect, interior and product designer, and restaurateur born in Hong Kong in 1957. Leung's works reflect a contemporary touch, taking inspirations from Asian culture and arts.

== Biography ==
Steve Leung set up his own architectural and urban planning consultancy in 1987 and later restructured it into Steve Leung Architects Ltd. (SLA) and Steve Leung Designers Ltd. (SLD) in 1997. Headquartered in Hong Kong and with four branch offices in Beijing, Shanghai, Guangzhou and Shenzhen, it is one of the largest interior design practices in Asia. In 2018, SLD Group is listed on the main board of the Hong Kong Stock Exchange (SEHK: 2262).

Leung served as the President of the International Federation of Interior Architects/Designers (IFI) 2017-2019 and the Executive Director of Design Committee at China National Interior Decoration Association (CIDA). In 2014, he joined hands with interior designers from Mainland China, Hong Kong and Taiwan to establish “C Foundation” to promote education and foster development of the design industry. In 2016, he was conferred the Vocational Training Council (VTC) Honorary Fellowship by the Secretary in recognition of his contributions to the development of vocational and professional education and training to Hong Kong. In 2018-2019, he was appointed as member of the Trade and Industry Advisory Board (TIAB) by the Secretary for Commerce and Economic Development of Hong Kong SAR Government and Chairman of HKTDC Design, Marketing and Licensing Services Advisory Committee.

Leung established a restaurant operation and management group named "1957 & Co." in 2007.

== Awards ==
- World’s Best Interior Designers by Andrew Martin International Interior Design Awards
- Listed in “50 Most Influential Person of in 2015” by INTERNI
- Listed in “30 Most Influential Designers” by FORBES China
