= May Chow =

Canadian-born Hong Kong/Chinese chef

- Born: Toronto, Ontario, Canada
- Education: Boston University
- Culinary career
- Current restaurants: Little Bao; Second Draft; Happy Paradise
- Award won: Asia's Best Female Chef 2017

May Chow is a Canadian-born Hong Kong/Chinese chef, who runs restaurants in Hong Kong and Thailand. She was named Asia's Best Female Chef in 2017, and has used this as a platform to promote LGBT issues and help women find work in professional kitchens.

== Career ==
May Chow was born in Toronto, Ontario, Canada. She was interested in cooking from an early age, helping her mother in the kitchen. She had wanted to take up horse riding or ceramics, but her parents were reluctant and so she used cooking as a creative outlet. Chow attended Suffield Academy in Suffield, Connecticut, but when she suggested that she wanted to go to culinary school, her college councillor rebuked her and told her to choose from a provided list of schools. Chow attended Boston University, where she studied hotel management. As part of the third year, she undertook cooking classes offered by local chefs.

While at University, she worked part-time as a chef, which she concealed from her parents. After graduation, she moved to Los Angeles where she worked alongside the private chef for director James Cameron. Chow travelled to Hong Kong in 2009, and was hired at Alvin Leung's Bo Innovation where she worked for a year. Afterwards she worked with Que Vinh Dang at TBLS, which has since been closed, as a private chef, and at Yardbird with Matt Abergel.

Chow first showed her signature mini-bao buns at an Island East Market in Hong Kong in 2012. Abergel suggested that she make them look like burgers, and supported her endeavour. She sold out her buns repeatedly at the farmer's market, and opened a permanent store Little Bao in 2013. A second location opened in Bangkok in 2017, along with a beer bar in Tai Hang, Hong Kong, called Second Draft.

In 2017, she was named the Best Female Chef by Asia's 50 Best Restaurants. She was contacted late in 2016 and told that she had won, in order to find out if she would accept or decline. Chow considered declining because of the responsibility that came with it, but decided to accept instead. She has used her local fame to focus on campaigning for LGBT issues, and to provide more opportunities for women in professional kitchens. She has also worked on a new Chinese restaurant in Hong Kong, called Happy Paradise. She has appeared on the Food Network series Inspired with Anna Olson.
