= Chi-Ming Chow =

Canadian cardiologist

Chi-Ming Chow FRCPC
- Education: McGill University, Montréal, Québec
- Occupations: Cardiologist, St. Michael's Hospital; Board of Directors, Heart and Stroke Foundation of Ontario

Chi-Ming Chow is a Canadian cardiologist at St. Michael's Hospital in Toronto, Ontario, Canada. He is often interviewed on national media about issues involving cardiovascular health, and is regarded as an influential advocate for heart health in the Canadian Chinese community.

== Career ==
Chow is an attending staff cardiologist at St. Michael's Hospital, Toronto, Ontario, Canada. He is also a Professor in the Department of Medicine, University of Toronto. He has an undergraduate degree in computer science from Brown University, Providence, Rhode Island, USA. He completed his Doctor of Medicine degree in 1990 at McGill University, in Montréal, Québec and a Masters of Science in Epidemiology, also at McGill University, in 1997. He completed his residency training in family medicine, internal medicine and cardiology at McGill University. He then pursued a clinical and research echocardiography fellowship at the Massachusetts General Hospital, Boston, Massachusetts, USA.

He had won multiple local and national teaching awards to recognize his teaching and innovation in medical education. He is a winner of the Ruedy Award for Innovation in Medical Education presented by the Association of Faculties of Medicine of Canada and Dalhousie University Faculty of Medicine and the 2009 William Goldie Prize for Innovation by the Department of Medicine, University of Toronto.

He is currently a board member and media spokesperson for the Heart and Stroke Foundation of Ontario. To recognize his service to the Heart and Stroke Foundation of Ontario, he won the Award For Volunteer Excellence in 2007 and the Rick Gallop Award for Pioneering Leadership in 2008.

He participates actively in health promotion and research among ethnic Chinese in Canada. He was awarded the Best Community Service Award by the Association of Chinese Canadian Entrepreneurs in 2010.

== Selected publications ==
- Chow, Chi-Ming; Linda Donovan; Doug Manuel; Helen Johansen; Jack V. Tu (December 2005). "Regional variation in self-reported heart disease prevalence in Canada". The Canadian Journal of Cardiology. 21 (14): 1265–1271. PMID 16341294. Archived from the original on 2011-09-27.
- Chow, Chi-Ming; Chu, Joseph Y.; Tu, Jack V.; Moe, Gordon W. (August 2008). "Lack of awareness of heart disease and stroke among Chinese Canadians: Results of a pilot study of the Chinese Canadian Cardiovascular Health Project". The Canadian Journal of Cardiology. 24 (8): 623–628. doi:10.1016/S0828-282X(08)70650-0. PMC 2644359. PMID 18685742. Archived from the original on 2011-09-27.
- Chow, Chi-Ming (2009). "Diastolic Dysfunction — A Case of Trouble Relaxing". Journal of Insurance Medicine. 41 (4): 241–243. PMID 20666102.
- Gill, Richard; Chi-Ming Chow (December 2010). "Knowledge of heart disease and stroke among cardiology inpatients and outpatients in a Canadian inner-city urban hospital". The Canadian Journal of Cardiology. 26 (10): 537–541. doi:10.1016/S0828-282X(10)70468-2. PMC 3006102. PMID 21165363.

== Software ==
Chow created a number of software packages for smartphones, including CardioMath (a calculator for commonly used formulas in cardiovascular medicine cardiology)
