= Cissy Pao-Watari =

Chinese artist and businesswoman

Cissy Pao-Watari (Chinese: 包陪丽; pinyin: Bāo Péilì) is a Chinese artist, businesswoman, and arts administrator, living in Hong Kong. She was the chair of the Hong Kong Ballet for ten years, and is currently the honorary director of the Hong Kong Arts Centre. She is a real estate developer with business in Hong Kong and Shanghai, owns a private art gallery in Hong Kong, and is a recipient of the Bronze Bauhini Star, a Hong Kong Dance Award, and the Montblanc de la Culture Arts Patronage Award.

== Career ==
Pao-Watari studied at art history at Washington University and earned an M.F.A. from the Cleveland Art Institute in painting and sculpture. She worked professionally as an artist, exhibiting her works in the U.S. and in Japan. Her work is a part of the collections in the Hong Kong Museum of Art.

In 1992, she returned to Hong Kong and was invited by Lavender Thornton Patten, the wife of former Hong Kong governor Chris Patten, to chair the Hong Kong Ballet company. Pao-Watari chaired the ballet for ten years, and still the chairperson emeritus.

In 2006, she was invited by the government of Hong Kong to chair the Hong Kong Arts Center, and continues in an honorary capacity today.

Pao-Watari is also a businesswoman, and has developed an art and shopping gallery in Hong Kong called Ferguson Lane. She is involved in real estate development in Hong Kong and Shanghai, restoring historical homes for resale.

Pao-Watari has received several awards for her contributions to arts in Hong Kong. In 2004, she received a distinguished achievement award during the Hong Kong Dance Awards. In 2006, she was awarded a Bronze Bauhinia Star from the Hong Kong government. In 2012, she received a Montblanc de la Culture Arts Patronage Award.

== Biography ==
Cissy Pao is the daughter of Yue-Kong Pao, the founder of Hong Kong's Worldwide Shipping Group. She has previously resided in New York and Tokyo, before returning to Hong Kong. She is married to architect Shinichiro Watari, and they have two children.
