= Lunar New Year fireworks display in Hong Kong =

Annual fireworks display in Hong Kong

Lunar New Year fireworks as viewed from the Mid-Levels in 2004.

Lunar New Year Fireworks Display in Hong Kong is an annual event to celebrate the Chinese New Year in Hong Kong. It is held on The second day of Chinese New Year above the sky of Victoria Harbor in the evening.

== History ==
In 1982, to celebrate its 150th anniversary, Jardine Matheson Holdings Limited sponsored the first fireworks display event, which received good public response. Since then, it became an annual event of Chinese New Year as a greeting to Hong Kong citizens.

The fireworks were canceled from 2020 to 2023 because of the COVID-19 pandemic. In 2024 the fireworks returned.

== Other events ==
Fireworks shows similar to this event are also held in Victoria Harbour on the common calendar's New Year's Eve on December 31 and the anniversary of Hong Kong's handover from the United Kingdom to China that happened on June 30, 1997.
