= Chow Kai Wing =

Chow Kai Wing (Traditional Chinese: 周佳榮; born 1947) is a Professor and the Head of Department of History in Hong Kong Baptist University.

Chow attended the Chinese University of Hong Kong, Hiroshima University, Osaka University of Foreign Studies and he gained a PhD at University of Hong Kong. Chow is a historian in Hong Kong and his research interests are focused on the modernization of East Asian Countries (China, Japan and Korea); Sino-Japanese relations; Intellectual History of Modern China.

Chow should not be confused with Chow Kai Wing of University of Illinois, who is also a historian.

== Bibliography ==
- Chow Kai Wing (2002). The Chinese Medical History Dictionary. Hong Kong: Chung Wah Book Company.
- Chow Kai Wing (1999). New Citizen and Revival: Major Themes in Modern Chinese Thought. Hong Kong: Lee Man Publication.
- Chow Kai Wing (1985). Historical Modern Japanese Culture and Thought. Taiwan: The Commercial Press.
