= Chow Kwen Lim =

Chow Kwen Lim BBS, MBE, JP, (1928–2016) in Shunde, Guangdong, is the founder and the chairman of Chow Sang Sang Jewellery Company, one of the most popular gold and jewellery accessories retailers in Guangdong, Hong Kong and Macau. He was a member of Sham Shui Po District Council and the director of Po Leung Kuk.
