= Winston Chow =

New York City community activist

Winston K.H. Chow is a student leader and community activist from New York City known for strong advocacy of students’ rights in public higher education and involvement in Asian American and immigrant rights issues.

From 2003-2004 he was elected President of the Student Government representing BMCC of the City University of New York (CUNY). In office, he represented a student population of 26,000. He is the first Chinese-American to take this office since the college's founding in 1963.

Strong opinions voiced by Chow's supporters and faculty of the CUNY administration's negative treatment of low-income students culminated in a free speech conflict involving the New York City Council in 2004.

According to Newsday reporter Merle English, in an article dated June 3, 2004, "Expecting to address more than 2,000 graduating students….Winston Chow started writing his speech on the value of student activism. But two days ago, the Student Government President, was told he wouldn't be allowed to speak at the commencement exercises at Madison Square Garden. [Chow,] an honors student with a 3.6 grade point average, will transfer to Columbia University or Vassar College in the fall. Because of the transfer, college officials told him Wednesday that he could not speak because he is not a member of the graduating class. Chow, other Student Government officials and their faculty advisors expressed outrage. But in another twist yesterday afternoon, Chow learned that administrators had relented. Administrators, responding to pressure from student leaders and elected officials, agreed to allow Chow to speak for three minutes. 'We resolved the conflict', said Charles Barron (D-Brooklyn), chairman of the [New York City] Council’s higher education committee."

During Chow's tenure he collaborated with organizations such as the University Student Senate (USS), of which he was Vice-Chair, and student leaders in other CUNY schools, organizing marches upwards of 10,000 students against public education tuition hike policies.

Chow was also Managing Editor (2003-2004) for left-leaning college newspaper The Voice of the Voiceless, and a contributing writer for the Hip-Not Magazine.

Chow is strongly involved in New York City's Chinese community demonstrated by his work for City Councilmember Alan Jay Gerson, representative for District 1 City Council Manhattan.

In 2010 and 2011, Chow consulted for the Renaissance Economic Development Corporation (partner organization of Asian Americans for Equality), and the Shuang Wen Academy Network (SWAN) (translated: Dual-Language Academy Network). Both organizations are well known for their involvement in New York's Chinese communities.

Chow's higher profile work at SWAN involved the organization's communication strategy confronting public allegations that Title I public school, PS184M, an elite Chinese-English dual language academy and SWAN's partner school, was misappropriating funds. The allegations attracted exclusive coverage by NY1 News and the New York Times.

In collaboration with parents and supporters, Chow led a media campaign demanding an apology from NY1 News citing Education Reporter Lindsey Christ's use of, "False facts, outdated materials, misrepresentative parent views and misquoted letters." SWAN's news release on October 14, 2010, described Christ's reporting: "The injuries by Ms. Christ's fallacious report have unjustly damaged the reputation and funding prospects for both 184 and SWAN."

Chow received his undergraduate degree from Columbia University and his graduate degree from the School of International and Public Affairs (SIPA) at Columbia University in the City of New York.

From 1999-2002 Chow managed operations for CBGB & OMFUG, an historically celebrated punk rock venue at 315 Bowery in Downtown Manhattan, before its closure in 2006. The venue was owned by Hilly Kristal and was known as a forum which introduced artists such as The Ramones, Misfits, and Talking Heads. Chow has cited his experience at CBGB as, "an influence on my politics and worldview."
