= American Journal of Physiology =

- Discipline: Physiology
- Language: English

Publication details
- History: 1898–present
- Publisher: American Physiological Society (United States)
- Frequency: Monthly

Standard abbreviations
- ISO 4: Am. J. Physiol.

Indexing
- CODEN: AJPHAP
- ISSN: 0002-9513
- LCCN: a43003158
- OCLC no.: 01480180

Links
- Journal homepage

The American Journal of Physiology is a peer-reviewed scientific journal on physiology published by the American Physiological Society.

Vols. for 1898–1941 and 1948-56 include the Society's proceedings, including abstracts of papers presented at the 10th-53rd annual meetings, and the 1948-56 fall meetings.

== Subjournals ==
The American Journal of Physiology has seven subjournals; according to the 2019 Journal Citation Reports their impact factors vary from 2.992 to 4.406:

- AJP-Cell Physiology
- AJP-Endocrinology and Metabolism
- AJP-Gastrointestinal and Liver Physiology
- AJP-Heart and Circulatory Physiology
- AJP-Lung Cellular and Molecular Physiology
- AJP-Regulatory, Integrative and Comparative Physiology
- AJP-Renal Physiology
