= Chow Chih =

Chinese general (1890–1953)

- Born: 14 February 1890; Hoiping, Guangdong
- Died: 8 March 1953 (aged 63)
- Spouse: Ao Yin-chiao
- Children: Chow Tso-hsu
- Military career
- Allegiance: Republic of China
- Conflicts: Northern Expedition; Second Sino-Japanese War

Chinese name
- Chinese: 周址
- Hanyu Pinyin: Zhōu Zhǐ
- Yale Romanization: Jāu Jí

Chow Chih (14 February 1890 – 8 March 1953) was a general for Sun Yat-sen and a four-star general for Chiang Kai-shek during the Chinese Civil War and second Sino-Japanese War. He is also known as Chou Chih or Zhou Zhi in Mandarin. Chow Chih was a military strategist who led 100 battles in Guangdong (Canton) and was introduced by Chiang Kai-shek at a 1942 anti-Japan planning conference as a soldier with great achievements in all the military arts.

== Early life ==
Chow was born on 14 February 1890, in Stone River Village, Cuanshi Township in Hoiping to his 17-year-old father Chow Tin Yuet and 19-year-old mother Chow Fang. Chow's father Tin Yuet was an early Chinese settler in Mississippi and was part of the Mississippi Delta Chinese. Tin Yuet regularly sent money home to his family and visited Canton. Chow's sister Run Ho was born a few years later and his brother Zhang Li was born in 1909. Tin Yuet owned and operated a grocery store in rural Hollandale, Mississippi.

Chow's first marriage at the age of 16 was to 18-year-old Ao Yin-Chiao (born 6 March 1888) from Canton and was arranged by his father Tin Yuet. A son named Chow Tso-Hsu was born on 16 April 1914 and was the only child born from Chow's first marriage.

== Military career ==
Chow graduated from the first class of Whampoa Military Academy in Canton, the first class of Baoding Officers School and then graduated in the third class of Army University in Peking (Beijing). North China warlord Zhang Zuolin, nicknamed the "Tiger of Manchuria," tried to recruit Chow to join the Fengtian Army but Chow headed from Army University in Peking with his classmate Deng Yanda to join Sun Yat-sen's National Revolutionary Army. Chow became a commander of a regiment for the People's Revolutionary Army and was then promoted to commander in chief, commander of the infantry, Office Director of the Ministry of Defense and played other significant roles for the Nationalist Party. He later returned to Whampoa as an instructor as the Lieutenant General in charge of the officers' research group and helped develop military talent including the head of the New First Army, Sun Liren and the Kuomintang commander-in-chief Liu Angi, according to Zhou Zhouhe and Zhou Songyao, two of Chow's former soldiers who wrote a short biography in Chinese entitled "General Zhou Zhi, Leader in the War of Resistance Against Japan."

Chiang noted that Chow had been in the first class of the Whampoa (now Huangpu) Military Academy, the first class of the Baoding Officers School and the third class of the Infantry University. Chow was then serving as the 12th group Nationalist Army general staff officer. "He (Chow) has brilliance in all things military and deserves respect as the supreme commander of the military world," Chiang told a joint meeting of key leaders of the Nationalists and Communists assembled in Nanye Heng Mountain. The meeting was also attended by He Yingqin who was then chief of staff for the Nationalist Army and subsequently briefly served as prime minister of China, and Communist leaders Mao Zedong and Zhou Enlai.

During the Northern Expedition of 1926–28 led by Chiang Kai-shek, Chow commanded troops along with General Xue Yue. Xue's troops found themselves surrounded by warlord troops and sent a message to Chow for a rescue. Chow managed to save Xue and his troops. Xue, a fellow Whampoa graduate. Xue's military skills against the Japanese later earned him the nickname "the Patton of Asia" by U.S. General Claire Chennault.

Chow's second marriage to Guo Wanrong from Nanjing in 1930 produced no children. On 1 May 1930, Chow's mother Chow Fang died at the age of 60. Condolences were written to Chow from many Nationalists and members of the military including Chiang Kai-shek, Sun Yat-sen's son Sun Fo, Nationalist General Zhang Xueliang and prominent businessman Soong Tse-ven. General Chow married a third time in 1933 at the age of 43 to 16-year-old Guo Yi Choy who was the younger sister of Chow's second wife.

In the early stages of the war against Japan, Chow was based in Canton as Lieutenant General and chief of the general staff of the 12th army group in the seventh military region. From 1938 to 1939, Chow was the section head in charge of military service in Canton. Chow was the head of the general staff of the seventh military region, lieutenant general and head of the general staff of the 12th military group from 1940 to 1944.

On 8 December 1941, the Japanese army attacked Hong Kong, then under British control. While the British Army fought back, it was overwhelmed by a coordinated Japanese assault on air, sea and land. The British government sent a telegram requesting help. The 12th group army, commanded by Chow and stationed in Shaoguan, was ordered to break the Japanese siege of Hong Kong. Chow set up a battle plan for Hong Kong and to protect his Canton base. Chow's fellow Nationalist general Yu Hanmou was named the commander to troops on a day and night march to Kowloon. They sent a telegram to the Hong Kong government that if the British troops could hold out until the end of December, the 12th group army would arrive to help fight the enemy, Chow's biographers wrote.

On Christmas Day 1941, as the Chinese relief troops were near position, they received the surprise news that British troops in Hong Kong had surrendered. Senior Chinese officials sent a telegram ordering the advance to stop and for the relief troops to return to their original bases. "Chow always felt regret at the suffering of his Hong Kong compatriots because of an order that arrived late and a surrender that took place too early," according to the Chinese biography on Chow.

== Later life ==
Chow retired from the military in 1946 and became a store owner in Nanjing. He became an adviser to the government in Guangdong for several months in 1949 before returning to his hometown of Kaiping with his third wife Guo Yi Choy and their three young children. Near the end of 1952, the Kaiping People's Court declared Chow a counter-revolutionary. After being held in a Kaiping bell tower for several weeks, Chow was executed by gunshot on 8 March 1953.

Chow's first son Tso-Hsu, who had served as a federal judge for Canton province before escaping to Hong Kong in 1951, appealed his father's conviction in 1982. The Kaiping County People's Court exonerated Chow Chih of all charges three years later. On 23 December 1985, the Yangcheng Evening News in China reported on Chow's exoneration.
