= Stefen Chow =

Singaporean-Chinese photographer (born 1980)

- 赵峰
- Born: 1980 (age 45–46); Kuala Lumpur, Malaysia
- Education: National University of Singapore
- Occupations: Photographer, artist
- Known for: Portraits, "The Poverty Line" project
- Website: Official website

Stefen Chow (Chinese: 赵峰; born 1980, Kuala Lumpur, Malaysia) a Malaysian photographer and artist based in Beijing, China. His work is widely published and exhibited internationally. In 2013, Chow's portrait of iconic Chinese artist and activist Ai Wei Wei was awarded at the World Press Photo. Chow frequently collaborates with economist Hui-Yi Lin using extensive data and research to produce long term visual projects. One of their prominent projects is “The Poverty Line", a visual project that contextualizes global poverty. The Museum of Contemporary Photography in Chicago and the Central Academy of Fine Arts Museum in Beijing has acquired works to their permanent collection.

== Early years ==
Stefen Chow graduated from Temasek Junior College before pursuing tertiary education in the National University of Singapore (NUS). Subsequently, Stefen Chow was tasked with the role of being the team's photographer for the National University of Singapore (NUS) Centennial Everest Team in 2002–05. After the team successfully summited Mount Everest in 2005, Chow decided to shoot professionally after meeting New York based UN photographer John Isaac and getting a positive review of his portfolio.

In 2007, Chow left for New York City to assist professional photographers and take classes at the International Center of Photography. He studied under photographer Amy Arbus, daughter of Dianne Arbus. Chow also attended the Eddie Adams Workshop. He shifted to Beijing in 2008 and has been based there since.

== Works ==
Using data and extensive research, Chow's works take social and economic themes and translate them into visual art.

=== The Poverty Line ===
The Poverty Line is an ongoing project which began in China in 2010 and has since expanded to 28 countries across 6 continents. The Poverty Line uses food as a base to examine the choices a person living at the poverty line would face. Chow is the co-creator of the project together with Hui-Yi Lin, an economist.

The project has been featured by multiple international print and online publications and exhibited as large scale installations in many prominent galleries and institutions.

=== Equivalence ===
Equivalence is a project which talks about the tensions between a need and a want, from the haves and the have-nots. By comparing the value between a luxury item over a daily necessity, the project aims to invoke the question of equality in the viewer's mind.

=== The Play Project ===
The Play Project is an aerial survey of 100 playgrounds spread across Singapore, which are then arranged and according to the subway map of the city on its website. The project was supported by the SG50 celebration fund. Photographed using a drone, the aerial view of playgrounds in Singapore is visually stunning, allowing viewers to see the playgrounds in Singapore in a new light. According to the research done by Stefen Chow and his collaborator Lin Hui Yi, there are about 1500 playgrounds in Singapore and this project has chosen 100 public playgrounds across Singapore to feature.

== Achievements ==
=== Selected solo exhibitions ===
2015 “deTour”, PMQ, Hong Kong

2015 “L’exposition MONEY – Les Nuits Photographiques”, Le Pavillon Carré de Baudouin, Paris

2015 “Second Photo Biennial – Unfamiliar Asia”, CAFA Museum, Beijing

2015 “The Poverty Line”, Studio 94, Taipei

2012 “Caochangdi PhotoSpring: Arles in Beijing”, Three Shadows Gallery, Beijing

2012 "3D in 4 Continents", Arts House, Singapore

2011 “The Poverty Line – China", Newton Circus, Singapore

2006 “Climbing the Human Spirit – an Everest Journey”, The National Library, Singapore

=== Selected group exhibitions ===
2015 “Observations of the Ordinary by Chow3”, ION Art gallery, Singapore

2015 “Picturing Change: Visual Culture and the Art of Advocacy”, White Box Publika, Malaysia

2013 “WYNG Masters Award”, Artistree, Hong Kong

2013 “China Stories”, Museum of Modern Art, Tbilisi, Georgia

2012 “Transience”, China House, Penang

2011 “Moment of Recognition”, International Center of Photography, New York

2011 “Photography Open Salon”, Galerie Huit, Arles

2009 “Prix de la Photographie”, Espace Dupon Gallery, Paris

2009 “Life and Dreams – Pingyao International Photography Festival”, China

2006 “Ngee Ann Photographic Exhibition”, Singapore

2005 “HYPE”, The Arts House, Singapore

=== Jury duty ===
2015 Nikon Photography Awards, Shanghai

2015 LIGHT & LIFE, National Geographic Live and Nanyang Technological University, Singapore

2015 Light in Your Heart, Shin Kong Insurance, Taiwan

2014 Head of Jury, Crowbar Awards, Photography, Singapore

2013 Nikon Photography Awards, Tokyo

2013–2015 Photography Director and Jury, The Other Hundred, Hong Kong

2006 – 2016 The Noise Award, National Arts Council, Singapore

=== Talks ===
2015 Picturing Poverty Conference, University of Sciences Po, Paris

2015 BODW, Hong Kong

2015 TEDxKyoto, Kyoto

2015 TEDxTaipei, Taipei

2015 LIGHT & LIFE, Nanyang Technological University, Singapore

2015 National Taiwan University, Taiwan

2014 APEC Women Leadership Summit, Beijing

2014 TEDxKL, Kuala Lumpur

2012 Global Talent Search, TED @ Shanghai

2012 School of Visual Arts

2008 TEDxBeijing, Beijing

=== Awards ===
2015 Outstanding Alumni, Temasek Junior College, Singapore

2014 Nominated, Young Global Leaders, World Economic Forum

2013 2nd Prize, World Press Photo, Amsterdam

2013 Nominated, Prix Pictet, Switzerland

2013 Finalist, WYNG Contemporary Art Prize, Hong Kong

2013 Winner, AI-PI, Latin American Fotografia

2011 Grand Prize, Arles Open Photography Salon, Galerie Huit, Arles

2010 1st Prize, Shipyards, Advertising, PX3, Paris

2010 Winner, World in Focus, National Geographic, New York

2010 Honorable Prize, China Workers, Px3, Paris

2009 3rd Prize, Photojournalism, Sports, PX3, Paris

2008 Winner, Eddie Adams Workshop, New York

2008 Winner, PDN Billboard Contest, New York

2008 Honorable Mention, International Photo Awards, New York

2008 Singapore Hero, Fortis, Singapore

2007 Young Outstanding Alumni, National University of Singapore

2006 Named Asia's Finest Photographers, Nikon
