= Raymond Chow (artist) =

Canadian artist (born 1941)

- Born: September 16, 1941 (age 84); Vancouver, British Columbia, Canada
- Occupations: Artist, Illustrator, Painter, Pianist, Composer, Writer

Raymond Chow (/ˈchau̇/; Chinese: 曹惠文; pinyin: cáo huì wēn; born September 16, 1941) is a Canadian artist. He is primarily recognized for his paintings and drawings. Chow is also a pianist, an author and a composer of musical works.

Chow creates colourful and detailed paintings of cats, still life, cities, windows, doors, beaches, gardens, and nudes. During the later periods of his work, Chow began experimenting with abstracts. His work is influenced by his experience with his family and during his travels in England, Hollywood, and Pasadena California, Maui, Oahu Hawaii. Chow also produces tiles, metal prints, giclee prints on canvas.

== Early life and education ==
Chow was born in Vancouver, British Columbia, to Emily Bing and Nam Chow. He is the nephew of Vancouver architect Bing Ming Mah. Chow attended General Wolfe Elementary School and King Edward High. Chow later graduated from the University of British Columbia's Art Education program and studied piano at the Toronto Royal Conservatory of Music.

Chow earned a teaching degree in art at UBC. After graduation, he taught at Vancouver Tech High School for a year, but then dedicated his time solely to his artistic work.

== Career ==
In the mid-1950s, while a teenager, Raymond began his art career drawing black ink drawings of Vancouver's wooden Victorian buildings. Later, Chow used a Chinese brush and painted with acrylics, beginning with a group of paintings he called the "Green Series". Then he completed a series of paintings called the "Red Series".

Raymond travelled throughout the world creating drawings of historical subject, including cityscapes, horses, gulls, and fortune cookies. He created drawings of artists drawing nude females and males for a book entitled 'POEMS & DRAWINGS'. After the birth of his children, Chow began including them and other children as subjects in his paintings.

In 1978, Chow designed the Canadian Captain Cook Coins. In 1983, he designed the Vancouver Symphony Show House cover and painted the "Beautiful People of Vancouver" series.

In 1985, Chow participated in fundraising for Canadian Paraplegic Association and performed on the piano at Cecil Green Alumni Association for University of British Columbia. In 1987, he release an album of original musical pieces through Mushroom Studios. In 1990, he fundraised for the Richmond Hospital Foundation.

In 1990, Chow established his own art gallery in Richmond, British Columbia; in 1992 he opened Art Warehouse, also in Richmond, and in 1994 he established Gallery in Steveston, Richmond. At this time he began his "White Gown" series of paintings. In 1996, he started the "Karen" series of paintings. Chow was inducted into the Knights of Saint Johns in 1995 in Vancouver.

In 1992, a portrait of Barbara Eden by Chow was planted with a kiss by televisions I Dream of Jeannie actress and auctioned at a benefit to raise money for autistic children. In 2003, Chow also organized a charity event called "The Fastest Draw in The West" paint-off competition during Langley's Art's Alive Festival. Local artists competed with Chow on a to paint an item or scene in fifteen minutes. The paintings were to be auctioned off, with partial proceeds from the auction going towards art supplies for children at Douglas Park Elementary school.

In 1997, Chow fundraised for Langley Fine Arts School and worked with the Vancouver Symphony Orchestra. In 1998, he fundraised for Shooting Stars Foundation and started Painters of Painter's Lodge in Campbell River. He then began work on his "Golfing" series.

In 2000, Chow fundraised for Richmond Sunrise Rotary. In 2005, he started Art Gallery Warehouse in Richmond. In 2007, he produced the Vancouver Historic Chinatown Calendar.

Chow donated artwork for silent auctions in 2004 to help raise funds for William Bridge Elementary School.

In 2007, Chow helped to establish the Steveston Artist Society (SAS), to support emerging artists.

Chow worked with other artists and the community to fundraise for Canuck Place Children's Hospice, General Wolfe Elementary School (Vancouver) Langley's The Aspire Integrative Remedial Education Society, and the Richmond Hospital Foundation

In 2013, Chow's art was in the collections thirteen galleries across Canada, Hawaii and the USA.

Raymond's work has been exhibited across Canada and in Seattle, San Francisco, and London, as well as at the Royal Palace of India in Rajasthan. In 2015, he travels in British Columbia and supports the Arts in Vancouver.

== Published work ==
Chow has published two books of his drawings of Vancouver and Expo '86, titled Vancouver As It Was and Expo As It Was, and has had one of his paintings included in the book 150 Years of Toronto. In addition, Chow has contributed illustrations for a few other publications.

== Personal ==
Chow was married with the former Joyce Quan. and later divorced. Chow has a son and a daughter. Chow has collected and rebuilt antique cars. He also collects old pianos and writes songs. He has worked, travelled and lived with his personal assistant Catherine Boudreau as of July 2008.
