= Stephen Chow Chun-kay =

Chinese businessman

- 周振基
- Born: Hong Kong, China
- Education: Golden Gate University; University of Hong Kong

Stephen Chow Chun-kay, GBS, SBS, BBS, JP (周振基教授) is a Chinese businessman.

== Education and career ==
Chow was born in Hong Kong and is a native of Xiashan, Shantou, Guangdong Province. He holds a bachelor's degree in business, a master's degree in Business Administration from Golden Gate University, USA, and a PhD degree in Business and Economics from the University of Hong Kong. He specializes in the manufacturing and R&D of high-technology raw materials. He is the Founder & Chairman of Nichetech and Chows Electronics Group (since 1981). His group is a supplier and manufacturer of electronics materials and ultrasonic bonding wire in Hong Kong & Mainland China. In 2010, Nichetech was officially recognized as the only "Guangdong Provincial Semiconductor and Microelectronics Material Engineering Technology R&D Center", and was also granted the "National High and New Technology Enterprise" by the Government.

== Arts work ==
Besides being a campaigner for Cantonese opera, Chow has been practicing the art form for many years under the tutelage of Lam Kar-sing. He was awarded the Honorary Doctorate of the Hong Kong Academy for Performing Arts in 2012.

He is the founding chairman of the executive committee, Cantonese Opera Development Fund, HKSAR Government

He is also a former member of the Performing Arts and Tourism Advisory Group, Consultative Committee on the Core Arts and Cultural Facilities of the West Kowloon Cultural District, HKSAR Government

Chow received an honorary professorship from The Hong Kong Academy for Performing Arts in 2016.

Chow has been the Council Chairman for the Hong Kong Academy for Performing Arts since 1 January 2016.

== Medical work ==
Chow served as the Chairman of Tung Wah Group of Hospitals in 2001 and has been appointed as the member of the advisory board since 2002. He had also been appointed as the member of the Social Welfare Advisory Committee in 2002. He has been appointed as the Court Member of the University of Science & Technology and also had been appointed as the Council Member of Lingnan University in 2003. where he also holds an Honorary Fellowship, and is a Court Member.

Chow is serving in leading positions in various business associations, such as the President of the Chiu Chow Chamber of Commerce. In 2002, he founded the Chinese Entrepreneurs Organization (CEO), a non-profit organization aiming at creating enterprising opportunities for China's entry into the World Trade Organization (WTO). Chow is active in community, business and educational circles. Chow has been honored several times by the government, having been awarded with the Golden Bauhinia Star in 2017, the Silver Bauhinia Star in 2008 and the Bronze Bauhinia Star in 2002, in addition to being appointed Justice of the Peace in 2004.

He is also the founder of the Dr. Stephen Chow Chun-kay Assisted Reproduction Centre, Kwong Wah Hospital, and is an Advisory Board Member and chairman of the Board (2001–2002), Tung Wah Group of Hospitals
