= List of Hong Kong people =

This is a list of notable Hongkongers, sorted by their last name in alphabetical order.

== A ==
- David Akers-Jones (鍾逸傑爵士), British colonial administrator, Chief Secretary of Hong Kong (1985 to 1987), Acting Governor of Hong Kong (1986–1987), Hong Kong Affairs Advisor
- Jamie Atkinson (傑米阿特金森), cricketer, Hong Kong cricket team
- Au Wai Lun (歐偉倫), footballer, Hong Kong National Representativemmers
- Au Chi-wai (區志偉), Hong Kong amateur snooker player
- Jin Au-Yeung (歐陽靖), rapper (American Chinese)

== B ==
- Clara Blandick (1876–1962), American theater and film actress
- Bob's Your Uncle, YouTuber who makes videos about cooking and travelling

== C ==
- Albert Chan (陳偉業), politician
- Anson Chan (陳方安生), politician and former civil servant
- Edith Chan (陳家碧), actress
- Eason Chan, singer, actor
- Fruit Chan (陳果), film director
- Hugo Chan (陳世強), lawyer, notary public
- Jackie Chan (成龍), actor
- Sita Chan (陳僖儀), singer
- Sophia Chan (陳肇始), professor and politician
- David Chan Yuk-cheung (陳毓祥), leader of Baodiao movement (保釣運動)
- William Chang (張叔平), art director, costume and production designer, film editor
- Catchick Paul Chater (遮打), businessman
- Chen Din Hwa (陳廷驊), businessman, founder of Nam Fung Development Ltd
- Edison Chen (陳冠希), actor, singer
- Fala Chen (陳法拉), singer, actress
- Kelly Chen (陳慧琳), singer, actress, TV presenter, movie director, commercial model
- Adam Cheng (鄭少秋), actor
- Davi Cheng, artist
- Sammi Cheng (鄭秀文), singer, actress, TV presenter
- Shiu-Yuen Cheng (鄭紹遠)
- Yumiko Cheng (鄭希怡), singer
- Cheng Ting Ting (鄭婷婷), artist
- Hilton Cheong-Leen (張有興), businessman and politician
- Angie Cheung (張慧儀)
- Cecilia Cheung (張柏芝), singer, actress
- Cindy Cheung (張瑋恩)
- Fernando Cheung (張超雄), lecturer, social worker
- Jacky Cheung (張學友), singer, actor
- Cheung Kam Ching, former head of the Department of Religion and Philosophy at Hong Kong Baptist University, currently Professor of the Department of Philosophy, The Chinese University of Hong Kong
- Leslie Cheung, singer, actor
- Maggie Cheung (Cheung Ho Yee)

Chen Han ren

- Maggie Cheung (Cheung Man Yuk), actress
- Mama Cheung, YouTuber who makes videos about cooking
- Rachel Cheung (張緯晴), pianist
- Steven Cheung, actor
- Steven N. S. Cheung, economist
- Teresa Cheung (Cheung Siu Wai)
- Benny Chia (謝俊興), author, founder of Fringe Club, festival director
- Chin Tsi-ang (錢似鶯), actress
- Angie Chiu (趙雅芝), actress
- Rebecca Chiu, Asia known squash player, Hong Kong National representative
- Samson Chiu (趙良駿), film director
- Raymond Cho (曹永廉), singer, actor
- Ada Choi (蔡少芬), actress
- Elkie Chong (莊錠欣), singer, actress based in South Korea, best known as a member of CLC
- Agnes Chow (周庭), politician and social activist
- Raymond Chow (鄒文懐), Hong Kong film producer
- Niki Chow (周麗淇), singer, actress
- Stephen Chow (周星馳), actor, comedian
- Vivian Chow (周慧敏), DJ, actress
- York Chow (周一嶽)
- Chow Yun-fat (周潤發), actor
- Grace Choy (孫美華), chef
- Almond Chu (朱德華), artist and photographer
- Athena Chu (朱茵), actress
- Samuel Chu
- Winston Chu (徐嘉慎), lawyer
- Wallace Chung, singer, actor
- Chung Sze Yuen (鍾士元), retired politician
- Adrienne Louise Clarkson (née Poy) (伍冰枝), journalist and stateswoman

== D ==
- Dejay Choi
- Venerable Prof. K. L. Dhammajoti, Buddhist monk and director of Buddha-Dharma Centre of Hong Kong Ltd
- Christopher Doyle (杜可風), cinematographer, actor, photographer, and film director
- Lydia Dunn (鄧蓮如), businesswoman, politician

== E ==
- Audrey Eu (余若薇), politician, former Member of the Legislative Council of Hong Kong

== F ==
- Fan Chun Yip, Asia known Hong Kong football star, Hong Kong National Representative
- Rita Fan (范徐麗泰), politician
- Henry Fok
- Timothy Fok (霍震霆), businessman, politician, son of Henry Fok
- Alex Fong Chung-Sun, Hong Kong TV and film actor
- Alex Fong Lik-san (方力申), professional swimmer turned actor and singer
- Alexander Fu (傅聲), actor
- Fu Mingxia (伏明霞), female diver, multiple Olympic gold medalist
- Marco Fu (傅家俊), world known snooker player
- Frederick Fung, Chairman of the Association for Democracy and People's Livelihood
- Fung Kwok Wai, Hong Kong amateur snooker player

== H ==
- Brian Hau, singer, songwriter and columnist
- Anne Heung (向海嵐), actress
- Tom Hilditch, journalist, publisher
- Albert Ho (何俊仁), Hong Kong Alliance in Support of Patriotic Democratic Movements in China person
- Cyd Ho (何秀蘭), politician
- Denise Ho (何韻詩), actress, singer
- Ho Sin Tung, artist
- Stanley Ho (何鴻燊), entrepreneur
- Willis Ho (何潔泓), activist, journalist
- Kuan Hsin-chi, chairman of the Civic Party
- Jessica Hester Hsuan (宣萱), actress
- Alfred Hui (許廷鏗), singer
- Andy Hui (許志安), actor
- Ann Hui (許鞍華), film director
- King Hu (胡金銓), film director
- Michael Hui (許冠文), actor, director, scriptwriter, producer
- Sam Hui (許冠傑), singer, actor
- Sammo Hung (洪金寶), actor, martial artist, film director
- William Hung
- Luke Hunt, journalist and author
- Babar Hayat, cricketer, Hong Kong cricket team

== I ==
- Stephen Ip (葉澍堃), politician

Jackie Chan Actor

== K ==
- Lawrence Kadoorie, businessman
- Michael Kadoorie, businessman
- Charles K. Kao (高錕), engineer and physicist
- Nicholas Kao Se Tseien (高師謙), Catholic priest
- James Johnstone Keswick, businessman
- William Keswick
- Ambrose King (金耀基), sociologist, educator, writer and academic
- Josephine Koo (顧美華), actress
- Stuart Krohn, rugby player, lock Hong Kong
- Charles Kwan (關兆昌)
- Stanley Kwan, film director
- Aaron Kwok, singer, dancer and actor
- Dennis Kwok (郭榮鏗), politician
- Raymond Kwok (郭炳聯), chairman and managing director of Sun Hung Kai Properties
- Thomas Kwok (郭炳江), former joint-chairman of Sun Hung Kai Properties
- Walter Kwok (郭炳湘), businessman, formerly chairman and CEO of Sun Hung Kai Properties
- Paul Kwong, Second Anglican Archbishop and Primate of Sheng Kung Hui
- Peter Kwong, First Anglican Archbishop and Primate of Sheng Kung Hui
- Kwok Ka Ming (郭家明)
- Leo Ku (古巨基), singer
- Louis Koo (古天樂), actor, singer
- Nancy Kwan, actress

== L ==
- Lucas Wong (黃旭熙), rapper of Thai and Chinese descent, former member of the South Korean boy group NCT and its Chinese sub-unit WayV
- Lai Ka Ying, astronaut on the Shenzhou 23 program, first Hong Kong SAR person to go to space
- Larissa Lai, writer, critic, and professor
- Leon Lai (黎明), singer, actor
- George Lam (林子祥), singer, actor
- Raymond Lam (林峯), TVB actor and singer
- Ringo Lam Leng-tung (林嶺東), film director
- Sandy Lam (林憶蓮), singer
- Sunny Lam, (晴天林), singer-songwriter
- Terence Lam, (林家謙), singer-songwriter
- Douglas Lapraik, shipping and real estate magnate
- Andy Lau Tak Wah (劉德華), actor and singer
- Lau Ching Wan (劉青雲), actor
- Emily Lau (劉慧卿), politician
- Kurtis Lau Wai-kin (劉偉健), professional League of Legends video game player
- Honcques Laus (劉康), activist, utilitarian
- Nathan Law (羅冠聰, activist and politician
- Akandu Lawrence (羅倫士), football player
- Allen Lee (李鵬飛), politician
- Ambrose Lee (李少光), former Secretary for Security of Hong Kong
- Andy Lee (李俊威), Hong Kong professional snooker player
- Lee Hoi-chuen (李海泉), Cantonese opera actor, father of Bruce Lee and Robert Lee
- Rain Lee, actress, singer, antagonist
- Bruce Lee (李小龍), kung fu master and actor, son of Lee Hoi-chuen
- Robert Lee (李振輝), musician, son of Lee Hoi-chuen
- Colleen Lee (李嘉齡), pianist
- Hacken Lee (李克勤), singer, actor
- Johnson Lee (李思捷), TVB actor, impressionist
- Lee Kin Wo, Hong Kong football star, Hong Kong National Representative
- Lee Lai Shan (李麗珊), windsurfer, Olympic gold medalist
- Lilian Lee (李碧華), novelist, best known as the author of Farewell My Concubine and Rouge
- Martin Lee, Democratic Party (Hong Kong)
- Martin Lee Ka-shing, businessman, son of Lee Shau Kee
- Newton Lee, Computer scientist, author, futurist, and chairman of the California Transhumanist Party
- Peter Lee Ka-kit, businessman, son of Lee Shau Kee
- Sam Lee, actor
- Lee San San (李珊珊), TVB actress, winner of 1996 Miss Hong Kong Pageant
- Lee Shau Kee, tycoon and philanthropist, father of Martin Lee and Peter Lee
- Starry Lee (李慧琼), politician, chairperson of the DAB
- Isabella Leong Lok Sze (梁洛施), singer and actress
- Antony Leung (梁錦松), businessman
- Leung Chun-ying (梁振英), 3rd Chief Executive of Hong Kong
- Edward Leung (梁天琦), politician and activist
- Elsie Leung (梁愛詩), solicitor
- Gigi Leung (梁詠琪), singer, actress
- Leung Kwok-hung (梁國雄), political activist also known as "Long Hair"
- Tony Leung Chiu Wai (梁朝偉), actor, singer
- Tony Leung Ka Fai, actor
- Joey Leung Ka Yin, contemporary artist
- Andrew Li (李國能), retired judge
- Arthur Li Kwok Cheung (李國章), Secretary for Education and Manpower
- Sir David Li (李國寶), banker
- Herman Li, founder and lead guitarist of power metal band DragonForce
- Li Ka Shing, tycoon and philanthropist, father of Richard Li and Victor Li
- Richard Li, businessman, son of Li Ka Shing
- Victor Li, businessman, son of Li Ka Shing
- Shawn Liao (廖士翔), former basketball player and opera patron
- Betty Loh (Loh Ti), actress
- Christine Loh, lawmaker

== M ==
- Ma Lin (馬臨), biochemist and educator; Vice-Chancellor of the Chinese University of Hong Kong (CUHK) from 1978 to 1987
- Ma Lik (馬力), Legislative Councillor, and was the Chairman of the Democratic Alliance for Betterment of Hong Kong
- Vivek Mahbubani, stand-up comedian
- Alexandra Christina Manley, first wife of Prince Joachim of Denmark
- Hormusjee Naorojee Mody (麼地), businessman
- Mong Man Wai, Chairman of Democratic Alliance for the Betterment of Hong Kong
- Karen Mok / Karen Joy Morris (莫文蔚), singer, actress
- Moy Lin-shin (梅連羨), Taoist monk and founder of Taoist Tai Chi Society
- Anita Mui (梅艷芳), singer
- Kenneth Ma (馬國明), actor
- Steven Ma (馬浚偉), actor
- Joe Ma (馬德鐘), actor
- Evergreen Mak Cheung-ching (麥長青), actor
- Lindsey McAlister MBE, theatre director
- David Millar, British cyclist
- Martin, cooking YouTuber
- Mira, YouTuber based in South Korea
- Victor, Principal of a Salvation Army primary school in Hong Kong

== N ==
- Carl Ng (吳嘉龍), model, actor
- Sandra Ng (吳君如), actress, comedienne
- Dorabjee Nowrojee, business
- Kary Ng (吳雨霏), singer
- Ng On-yee, Hong Kong women snooker player
- Ron Ng (吳卓羲), actor, singer

== O ==
- Darryl O'Young (歐陽若曦), racing driver

== P ==
- The Pancakes
- Fung Chin Pang (馮展鵬), comic artist and illustrator
- Jenny Pat, Pat Lui Lui (Bi Lei Lei) (畢蕾蕾)
- Lord Christopher Patten (彭定康), British politician and the last Governor of Hong Kong
- Hong Kong Phooey, Crime fighter and martial arts expert. Also known as Penrod "Penry" Pooch
- Chung-Kwong Poon, Vice-Chancellor of Hong Kong Polytechnic University
- Neville Poy
- Vivienne Poy (née Lee)

== R ==
- Michelle Reis (李嘉欣), actress, winner of 1988 Miss Hong Kong Beauty Pageant
- Gregory Charles Rivers (河國榮), actor
- Ruan Lingyu (阮玲玉), actress
- Dhun Jehangir Ruttonjee
- Jehangir Hormusjee Ruttonjee

== S ==
- Leslie George Santos (山度士), footballer
- Victor Sassoon, businessman and hotelier
- Run Run Shaw (邵逸夫), entertainment mogul and philanthropist
- Jimmy Sham (岑子杰), politician and activist
- Runme Shaw (邵仁枚), chairman and founder of the Shaw Organisation of Singapore
- Charmaine Sheh (佘詩曼), actress
- Lydia Shum (沈殿霞), comedian, MC, and actress
- Sik Kok Kwong (釋覺光), Buddhist monk and first president of the Hong Kong Buddhist Association
- Edwin Siu (蕭正楠), actor, singer
- Erena So (蘇凱琳, 素海霖), pornographic actress
- Yan-kit So, food scholar and cookbook writer
- Angela Su (辛婥琳), artist
- Michelle Sun, entrepreneur
- Korina Sanchez, newscaster, tv host

== T ==
- Alan Tam (譚詠麟), singer, actor
- Patrick Tam (Tam Kar Ming)
- Patrick Tam (Tam Yiu Man)
- Roman Tam (羅文), singer
- Alan Tang (鄧光榮), actor
- Henry Tang (唐英年), businessman
- Tat Ming Pair
- Tsai Yuan-pei (蔡元培), revolutionary, educator and politician
- Donald Tsang (曾蔭權), 2nd Chief Executive of Hong Kong
- John Tsang Chun-wah (曾俊華)
- Tsang Tsou Choi (曾灶財), calligraphy artist
- Kay Tse (謝安琪), singer
- Nicholas Tse, actor, singer
- Angus Tsui, fashion designer
- Kate Tsui (徐子珊), actress, singer
- Kristal Tin (田蕊妮), actress, singer
- Daniel C. Tsui (崔琦), physicist, awarded Nobel Prize in Physics
- Tsui Hark (徐克), film director, producer, screenwriter
- Johnnie To (杜琪峯), film director, producer
- Raymond To (杜國威), dramatist, screenwriter & film director
- Ronny Tong (湯家驊), politician
- Tung Chao Yung (董兆榮), founder of Orient Overseas Container Line
- Tung Chee Hwa (董建華), 1st Chief Executive of Hong Kong
- Lysanne Tusar, winemaker

== V ==
- David "Comedy Dave" Vitty

== W ==
- Jackson Wang, member of the popular South Korean boy group GOT7, solo artist in China, former member of China's national fencing team
- Nina Wang (née Kung) (龔如心), businesswoman
- Teddy Wang, billionaire and disappeared person who was married to Nina Wang
- Wayne Wang (王穎), film director
- David Michael Webb activist, share market analyst
- Wen Shaoxian, writer
- Chow Kai Wing, heads the History Department at Hong Kong Baptist University
- Anthony Wong Chau Sang (黃秋生), actor
- Ay Wong Yiu Ming (黃耀明), singer
- Eleanor Wong (黄懿伦), pianist and Senior Lecturer at The Hong Kong Academy for Performing Arts
- Carter Wong (黃家達), actor and martial arts instructor
- Emi Wong (王樂婷), fitness, lifestyle, and travelling YouTuber
- Faye Wong (王菲), actress, singer-songwriter
- Jennifer Wong, writer, poet
- Joshua Wong (黃之鋒, politician and activist
- Lucas Wong (黃旭熙), rapper based in South Korea and China, best known as a former member of NCT and its sub-units, NCT U and WayV
- Morgan Wong (黃榮法), performance artist
- Wong Cho-lam (王祖藍) stage actor, television actor
- Wong Kam-po, World Champion racing cyclist, Hong Kong National Representative
- Wong Kar Wai (王家衛), film director, producer
- Koma Wong, vocalist, guitarist, songwriter of Beyond
- Natalie Wong (黃𨥈瑩), actress
- Race Wong (黃婉伶), singer
- Ray Wong (黃台仰), activist
- Raymond Wong (Wong Yuk-man)
- Wong Wo Bik, architectural photographer
- Wong Yan Lung (黃仁龍), barrister, judge
- John Woo (吳宇森), film director, screenwriter, editor
- Daniel Wu (吳彥祖), actor, film director, screenwriter
- Wu Kwok Hung (胡國雄), retired Hong Kong football star, former Hong Kong National Representative
- Myolie Wu (胡杏兒), actress

== Y ==
- Jack Yan
- Choi Yan-chi, artist
- Ti Liang Yang (楊鐵樑), retired judge
- Chao Yat
- Benny Yau
- Sally Yeh (葉蒨文), singer, actress
- Donnie Yen (甄子丹), actor, martial artist, film director
- Yeoh Eng Kiong
- Michelle Yeoh, actress
- Angela Yeung Wing, model and actress more commonly known by stage name Angelababy
- Miriam Yeung (楊千嬅), singer, actress
- Yip Hon (葉漢), gambling tycoon
- Yim Ho
- Sam Yip
- Patrick Yu
- Lawrence Yu (余錦基), businessman, director of Hong Kong Football Association
- Yuan Gongyi, businessman and activist
- Tik Chi Yuen, Vice Chairman of Democratic Party (Hong Kong)
- Yuen Biao (元彪), actor, producer, action choreographer
- Anita Yuen (袁詠儀), actress, winner of 1990 Miss Hong Kong Pageant
- Corey Yuen (元奎), action director, action Choreography, director, producer
- Darius Yuen (阮勵欣), investment banker and philanthropist
- Yuen Kwok-yung (袁國勇), microbiologist, physician, surgeon
- Yuen Wah (元華), actor, action choreographer
- Tavia Yeung (楊怡), actress
- Zhou Yongqin (周永勤), member of the Hong Kong Progressive Alliance and the Liberal Party
- Tyson Yoshi (程浚彥), rapper and hip hop singer

== Z ==
- Allan Zeman (盛智文), businessman
- Joseph Zen Ze-kiun (陳日君), 6th Bishop of Hong Kong

== See also ==
- List of governors of Hong Kong
- List of chief secretaries of Hong Kong
- Index of articles related to Hong Kong
- List of Hong Kong ODI cricketers
- List of graduates of University of Hong Kong
- List of Chinese University of Hong Kong people
- List of Hong Kong people of Shanghainese and Lower Yangtze descent
- List of Hong Kong people of Sze Yap descent
