= Li Haijun =

Li Haijun (Chinese: 李海俊; pinyin: Lǐ Hǎijùn; born November 1952) is the President of Sias International University.

A native of Wuwei, Gansu, Li Haijun received his B.A. degree in English literature from Lanzhou University in 1976. He worked in Tibet Normal College and Tibet University from 1976 to 1994. He worked towards master's degrees from Jilin University in 1981 and Nanjing University in 1986.

He was the director of foreign affairs at Zhengzhou University from 1999 to 2004. He was named president of Sias University in the spring of 2005.
