= Wen Shaoxian =

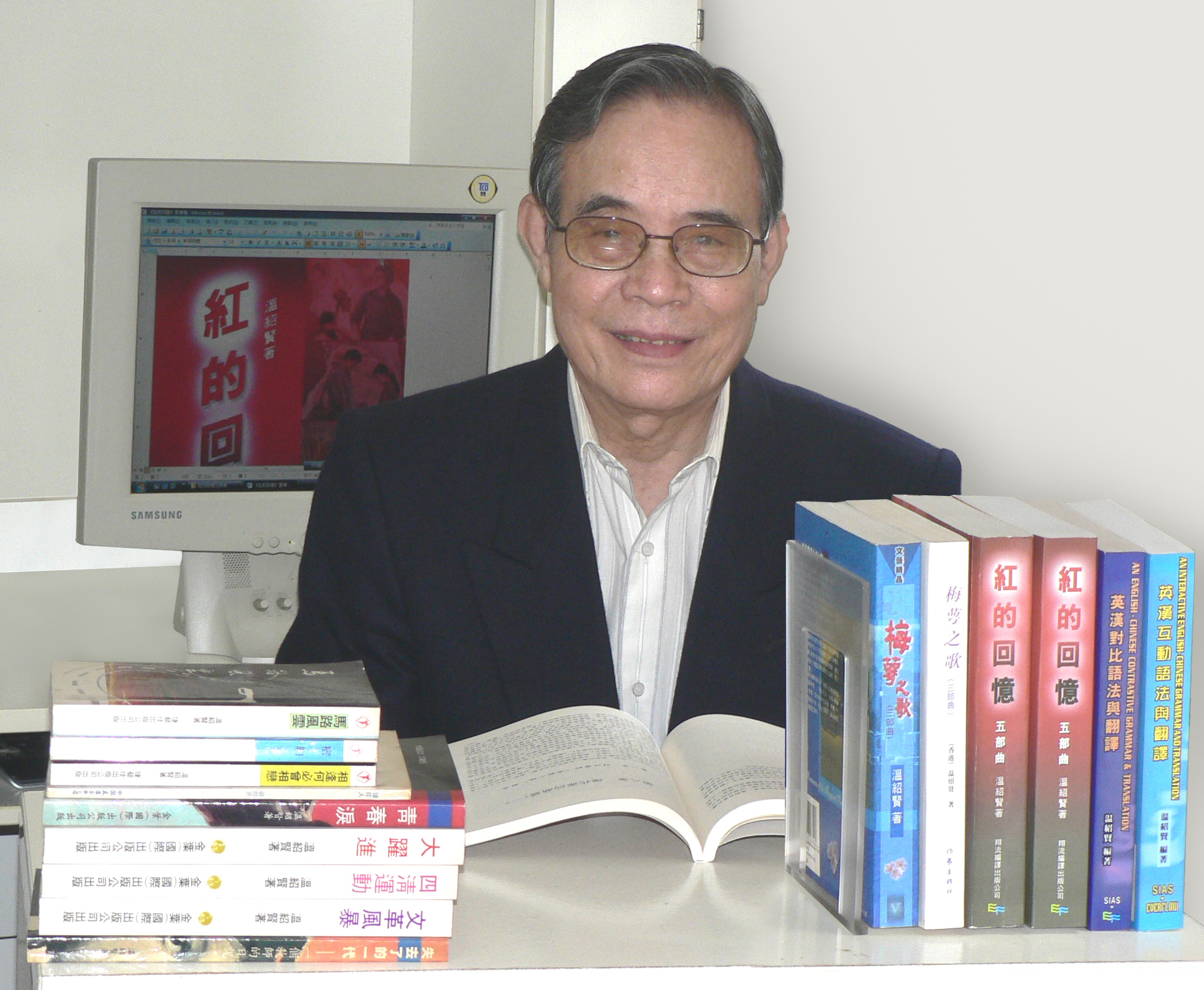
- Wen Shaoxian in August 2010
- Born: Wan Siu Yin; 4 December 1934; Hong Kong
- Occupations: Writer, translator, scholar

Wen Shaoxian (Chinese: 溫紹賢), born 4 December 1934) also known as Wan Siu Yin is a literary writer, famous for his short stories about the lives of the new immigrants from the mainland in Hong Kong. He is expert in writing political and historical novels. Wen is a translator and editor by profession and is also a professor of translation and comparative grammar.

== Biography ==
Wen was born in Hong Kong in an intellectual family. His father was a schoolmaster all his life. When Hong Kong was occupied by the Japanese invaders in 1941, his family had to flee Hong Kong and go back to their ancestral home in Qingyuan County, Guangdong Province, where his mother died of typhoid fever some time later. In the several years that followed, the family led a poor and unstable life there. After the war, Wen and his elder brother came back to Hong Kong to live with their grandmother who was the chief cook of an English taipan family. In 1954, he was admitted to Sun Yat-sen University in Guangzhou, China, majoring in English language and literature. Upon his graduation in 1958, he was assigned to do odd jobs in a remote mountainous area in Guangxi Province . He was transferred to the Department of Foreign Languages of Guangxi University in 1961. He had successively held the posts of assistant, lecturer and deputy director of the English teaching and researching section there. He was allowed to come back to Hong Kong in 1978.

After he returned to Hong Kong, Wen had served successively as translator, translation copy editor and chief editor in a number of established translation or publishing companies. The number of books he translated and copy-edited amounted to over one hundred. He has been engaged in the study of Chinese-English contrastive grammar and translation for more than three decades. So far he has published nine academic books and a number of theses in this connection. Besides, he has held the post of honorary professor at Sias International University affiliated to Zhengzhou University in Henan Province, China since 2001.

Wen has been engaged in literary work for more than half a century. His literary works include ten novels, three collections of short stories and two biographies. His short stories, characterized by their "unexpected ending," were well received by the readers both in Hong Kong and in mainland China. His New Immigrants, a collection of short stories published in Beijing in 1987, was a best seller in the mainland. Wen's novel Fragrant Port trilogy was published in Beijing in 2000 by the Writers Publishing House, one of the two top literary publishing institutions in China. The Literary Gazette, a very famous literary critical publication in Beijing, regarded it as "a masterpiece faithfully reflecting the vicissitudes of fortune Hong Kong had experienced over the past one hundred years." Of his ten novels, nine have been translated into English, of which the author translated eight and copied-edited the other one. They were published in e-book edition by Everflow Publications in Hong Kong in March and May 2011 respectively and are distributed and sold by Amazon Digital Services, USA.

Wen had spent fifteen years in writing his Fruitless Flowers, a novel series. It consists of five books which were published in Hong Kong in 1987 and 1992 successively. It brings to light for the first time in the form of literature the complete process of all the major political movements waged by Mao Zedong during his 27-year rule over China, along with one tragic story after another taking place during that period. Professor Yuan Liangjun, research fellow with the Institute of Literature under the Chinese Academy of Social Sciences, wrote in his work 《香港小說流派史》 (History of Different Schools of Fiction in Hong Kong), "Fruitless Flowers is the only novel series so far portraying the ultra-Left errors in China during the 1950s, 1960s and 1970s. With its grand boldness of vision and very true-to-life settings, the novel series profoundly reflects the tragic history of that period." Tung Rui, a well-known writer in Hong Kong and overseas, said in his article 《溫紹賢系列長篇的成功》 (Wen Shaoxian's Novel Series Is a Success) (published in Literary Free Talk, a very well-known literary review magazine in China, in its issue 2, 1992): "Fruitless Flowers novel series by Wen Shaoxian, has a great and inestimable significance... Fruitless Flowers novel series is a literary work with an epical structure. It serves as a telling witness to the part of tragic history in China. Its value of existence allows of no doubt no matter what its gain or loss would be… Its literary value is sure to coexist with history." Under the new title of Red Memories pentalogy, its one volume revised edition was published in Hong Kong in 2008. Soon it was permanently collected as a rare book by the National Museum of Modern Chinese Literature in Beijing, the most authoritative modern Chinese literature institution in China.

== Bibliography ==
=== Literary works ===
Book/Article Title	Publication/Publishing Institution
1.《瑪莉不是中國人》 (Mary Is not a Chinese); 《史團長應徵》 (Regimental Commander Shi's Bad Dream);《謀生伎倆》 (A Means of Life), and other dozen short stories	Wen Wei Po, Weekend Post, Hong Kong (1951–1953)
2.《嫂嫂》(Sister-in-Law) (short story)	Rainbow Weekly, Hong Kong (9 February 1952)
3.《夢》 (A Dream) (short story, translation work)	Rainbow Weekly, Hong Kong (8 March 1952)
4.《染髮記》 (Hair Coloring); 《相逢一笑》 (Settle Old Scores with a Smile); 《白馬王子今何在》 (Where Is my Secret Lover Now? ) and other dozen short stories)	Wen Wei Po, New Evening Post, Hong Kong (1980 to 1993)
5.《墮胎記》 (The Story of Induced Abortion) (short story)	Dangdai (Era) Bi-Monthly, People’s Literature Publishing House, Beijing (June 1985)
6.《比利》(Pele) (literary biography)	Sun Ya Publications (HK) Ltd. (1985)
7.《甘地》(Gandhi) (literary biography, co- author)	Sun Ya Publications (HK) Ltd. (1985)
8.《移民》 (To Reside Abroad); 《餘孽》 (Leftover Evils); 《替身》(Stand-in) (3 short stories)	The Hong Kong Literary Press (March 1986, May 1986 and Feb.1987)
9.《鴻溝》 (An Impassable Chasm) (short story)	The Literary Bi-Monthly, People’s Literature Publishing House, Beijing (April 1987)
10.《宿約》 (An Old Promise) (novella)	The Literary Bi-Monthly, People’s Literature Publishing House, Beijing (October 1987)
11.《歸宿》 (A Home to Return to) (short story)	Tianjin Literature, China (December 1987)
12.《失去了的一代》(The Generation Lost) (Book Five of Fruitless Flowers novel series)	e-Book edition: Published by Everflow Publications, Hong Kong (July 2011); Physical book edition: Hong Kong Gold Leaf (International) Publications (1987)
13.《綠印人》 (New Immigrants) (collection of short stories)	China Friendship Publishing Company, Beijing (1987)
14.《青春淚》 (Tearful Youth) (Book One of Fruitless Flowers novel series)	e-Book edition: Published by Everflow Publications, Hong Kong (July 2011); Physical book edition: Hong Kong Gold Leaf (International) Publications (1987)
15.《宿約》 (An Old Promise) (collection of short stories)	Top-Notch Publications Co., Hong Kong (1988)
16.《相逢何必曾相戀》 (Tragic Union) (collection of short stories)	Top-Notch Publications Co., Hong Kong (1990)
17.《替身》(Stand-in) (short story)	Sihai (4-Seas) Bi-Monthly, Beijing (March 1991)
18.《馬路風雲》 (Storms over the Road Building Sites) (novel)	Top-Notch Publications Co., Hong Kong (1991); Hong Kong Society for the Blind (Braille version, 1992)
19. 《魂斷彩虹》 (Rainbow Bridge) (Book Two of Fruitless Flowers novel series)	e-Book edition: Published by Everflow Publications, Hong Kong (July 2011); Physical book edition: Hong Kong Gold Leaf (International) Publications (1992)
20. 《瀝血殘花》] (Withered Flowers) (Book Three of Fruitless Flowers novel series)	e-Book edition: Published by Everflow Publications, Hong Kong (July 2011); Physical book edition: Hong Kong Gold Leaf (International) Publications (1992)
21. 《肆虐狂飆》](Awful Catastrophe) (Book Four of Fruitless Flowers novel series)	e-Book edition: Published by Everflow Publications, Hong Kong (July 2011); Physical book edition: Hong Kong Gold Leaf (International) Publications (1992)
22. 《憔悴損芳姿》 (Pathfinder) Book 1 of Fragrant Port trilogy 23.《春事破寒來》(Working Wonders) Book 2 of Fragrant Port trilogy 24. 《只有香如故》 (Fragrant Forever) Book 3 of Fragrant Port trilogy	e-Book edition: Published by Everflow Publications, Hong Kong (July 2011); Physical book edition: Vertex Consultancy (Hong Kong edition, 1998); Writers Publishing House (Beijing edition, 2000)
25.《紅的回憶》 (Red Memories pentalogy) (one-volume revised edition of Fruitless Flowers novel series)	Everflow Publications, Hong Kong (Sept. 2008)
26.《林邊紅屋》 (Dear Pursuit) (novel)	e-Book edition: Published by Everflow Publications, Hong Kong (July 2011); sold by Handheld Culture, Hong Kong; Physical book edition: Published by Everflow Publications (Feb. 2012)
27. 《溫紹賢中短篇小說自選集》 (e-Book edition) (Collection of Shaoxian Wen’s Short Stories)	Published by Everflow Publications, Hong Kong (Dec. 2013); distributed by Google Books

=== Academic works ===
Book/Article Title	Publication/Publishing Institution
1.《評〈紅樓夢〉中詩詞的英譯》(Comments on Translation of the Poems in A Dream of Red Mansions) (thesis)	Open-Book book review magazine, Hong Kong (January 1980); reprinted by References for Editing and Translation magazine, Beijing, (April 1980); included in the Collection of Theses of Redology in Hong Kong (Baihua Literature and Art Publishing House, Tianjin, China, 1982)
2.《實用英漢比較語法》 (A Practical English-Chinese Comparative Grammar) (book)	Hong Kong Gold Leaf (International) Publications (October 1986)
3.《中英古典詩歌的意境》 (Artistic Conception of Chinese and English Classical Poems) (thesis)	Collection of Articles by Members of Hong Kong Writers Federation (Hong Kong Writers Federation, August 1991)
4.《從我國古典詩詞中的「合」看中英詩歌之異同》 (The Ending of Chinese Classical Poems Shows the Similarities and Differences between Chinese and English Classical Poems) (thesis)	The Hong Kong Literary Press (issue 185, May 2000)
5.《民族的特有意境 — 詩詞翻譯中難於逾越的鴻溝》 (Special National Conception – An Unbridgeable Gap in the Translation of Poems from Chinese to English) (thesis)	Ching Ying magazine (publication of the Student Association of the University of Hong Kong, August 2000)
6.《中英文互譯技巧》 (Translation Technique from C to E & E to C) (lecture)	Lecture at Sias International University, Henan, China (May 2001)
7.《英語疑問句的結構及應用 — 兼與漢語的疑問句作比較》 (Structure and Application of English Interrogative Sentences) (lecture)	Lecture at Sias International University, Henan, China (May 2001)
8.《曲折的寄託 — 中詩英譯的一大難題》 (Obscure Implication – A Hard Nut to Crack in the Translation of Chinese Poems into English) (thesis)	Life (collection of essays by Hong Kong Writers Federation members, Ming Pao Daily Publishing Company, Feb. 2002)
9.《英漢互動語法與翻譯》 (An Interactive English-Chinese Grammar & Translation) (book)	Sias International University, Henan, China (Jan. 2003)
10. 《中英詩意境的異同及其翻譯》](On Difference & Identity of Artistic Conception between Chinese and English Poems & its Translation) (book)	e-book edition: Hong Kong Everflow Publications (July 2011); Physical book edition: Sias International University, Henan, China (Jan. 2003)
11. 《英漢對比語法與翻譯》 (An English-Chinese Contrastive Grammar & Translation) (book)	Sias International University, Henan, China (Sept. 2004)
12. 《漢英對比語法與翻譯》](A Chinese-English Contrastive Grammar & Translation) (e-book)	Hong Kong Everflow Publications (July 2011); sold by Handheld Culture, H.K.
13. An Active Modern Chinese Grammar & Translation (e-book)	Hong Kong Everflow Publications (July 2011)
14. 《中文常用詞句及中英對比與翻譯第一輯：相異篇》 (Useful Chinese Words & Expressions: Book One)	e-book edition: Hong Kong Everflow Publications (July 2011); Physical book edition: Hong Kong Everflow Publications (Feb. 2012)
15. 《中文常用詞句及中英對比與翻譯第二輯：相近篇》 (Useful Chinese Words & Expressions: Book Two)	e-book edition: Hong Kong Everflow Publications (July 2011); Physical book edition: Hong Kong Everflow Publications (Feb. 2012)
16. 《中文常用詞句及中英對比與翻譯第三輯：相似篇》 (Useful Chinese Words & Expressions: Book Three)	e-book edition: Hong Kong Everflow Publications (July 2011); Physical book edition: Hong Kong Everflow Publications (Feb. 2012)
17. 《中英對比與互譯精要》 (Chinese-English Comparative Studies) (e-book edition)	Hong Kong Everflow Publications (December 2013); sold by Google Books Partner Program
18. Essentials of Modern Chinese] (English e-book edition)	Hong Kong Everflow Publications (April, 2014)
19. Steps to Elegant Translation from E to C] (English e-book edition)	Hong Kong Everflow Publications (June, 2014)
20. Chinese Sentence Patterns (classified) (English e-book edition)	Hong Kong Everflow Publications (June, 2014)
21. Chinese Numerals & Classifiers (English e-book edition)	Hong Kong Everflow Publications (Aug., 2014)

=== Comments on Wen's Works ===
Article/Book Title	Author	Publication/Publishing Institution
1.《只有熟悉才能真實— 溫紹賢〈綠印人〉讀後》 (Authenticity Comes from Familiarity – Comments on NEW IMMIGRANTS)	Tung Rui	Reader's Companion—A Book Review Monthly, Hong Kong (October 1987)
2.《綠印人百態》 (A Gallery of New Immigrants)	Wan Si	Everyday Daily, Hong Kong (30 July 1988)
3.《含淚的幽默和微笑 — 序溫紹賢「綠印人」系列之二〈宿約〉》 (Humor and Smile through Tears – Preface to AN OLD PROMISE)	Tung Rui	Wen Wei Po, Literary Page, issue 536, Hong Kong (21 August 1988)
4.《反映綠印人的小說集》 (Collection of Short Stories about New Immigrants)	Yang Lan	Wen Wei Po, Hong Kong (1 December 1988)
5.《溫紹賢寫出悲憤經歷》 (Wen Shaoxian Writes about his Bitter Experience)	Luo Han	Sing Tao Daily, Hong Kong (10 January 1989)
6.《第一個高度 — 八十年代香港小說巡禮》 (The First Height – A Review of Hong Kong's Fiction in the 1980s)	Pan Yadun	The Hong Kong Literary Press, issue 59 (November 1989)
7.《溫紹賢系列長篇的成功》(Wen Shaoxian's Novel Series Is a Success)	Tung Rui	Literary Free Talk magazine, Tianjin, China (Issue 2, 1992)
8.《長篇巨製〈無果花〉》 (FRUITLESS FLOWERS – Full-length Novel Series)	Zeng Minzhi	Wah Kiu Daily, Hong Kong (December 1992)
9.《香港作家譜寫香港歷史 — 溫紹賢〈梅萼之歌〉出手不凡》 (FRAGRANT PORT, a Masterly Feat by Wen Shaoxian)	Shihua Saloon	Shihua Literature, Beijing, issue 99 (February 1999)
10.《一部展現香港百年來滄桑變化的力作 — 〈梅萼之歌〉》 (FRAGRANT PORT, a Masterpiece reflecting the Vicissitudes Hong Kong had Experienced over the Past One Hundred Years)	Zeng Minzhi	Literary Gazette, Beijing (25 November 1999)
11.《這麼重 那麼輕 — 紅的回憶》 (This Is So Heavy and That Is So Light – RED MEMORIES)	Cheng Wai-yam	Ming Pao daily, Cultural Information Page, Hong Kong (21 February 2000)
12.《為「小人物」立傳 — 香港現代都市小說平民意識論》 (Comments on THE STORY OF INDUCED ABORTION)	Li Yuntuan	TsingHua net, Beijing (15 March 2001)
13.《失去了的一代》序 (Preface to THE GENERATION LOST)	Zeng Minzhi	Included in A Carpet of Green before the Windows, Ming Cheung Publishing Co., Ltd. Hong Kong (Sept. 2001)
14.《香港小说流派史》(History of Different Schools of Fiction in Hong Kong)	Yuan Liangjun	Fujian People’s Publishing House, China (January 2008)

=== Part of Wen's Translation Works ===
==== E to C ====
- The Biography of De Gaulle (copy editor, Beijing People's Publishing House, 1978)
- The Ocean's Mysteries (Ming Tin Publishing Co., Hong Kong, 1981)
- The Joy of Sex (co-translator, Blue Bird Publications, Hong Kong, 1981)
- Introducing Computers (Blue Bird Publications, Hong Kong, 1982)
- The Ancestor Halls in the New Territory (Blue Bird Publications, Hong Kong, 1983)
- The Crystal Skull (co-translator, Wan Li Book Co., Ltd., Hong Kong, 1983)
- Harrap's Drive in English (Harrap, London, 1983)
- The Sicilian Contract (co-translator, Sun Ya Publications (HK) Ltd. 1985)
- The Tomb of Amenois (co-translator, Sun Ya Publications (HK) Ltd. 1985)
- The Kama Sutra (Chinese Canadian Daily, Canada, 1985)
- The Koka Shastra (Chinese Canadian Daily, Canada, 1986)
- Sex in History (Unicorn Books Limited, Hong Kong, 1990)
- Mystery of Sexy (Holdery Publishing Enterprises Ltd., Hong Kong, 1991)
- Mix and Match Designer's Colours (Art Distribution Centre Ltd., Hong Kong, 1993)
- How to Check and Correct Colour Proofs (Art Distribution Centre Ltd., 1993)
- QuarkXPress: A Visual Guide for the Mac (copy editor, Art Distribution Centre Ltd., 1994)
- Information Illustration (copy editor, Art Distribution Centre Ltd., Hong Kong, 1994)
- Illustration Software on the Mac (copy editor, Art Distribution Centre Ltd., Hong Kong, 1995)
- Animation and 3D Modeling on the Mac (copy editor, Art Distribution Centre Ltd., 1995)
- Pro-Lighting: Exquisite Shots (copy editor, Art Distribution Centre Ltd., Hong Kong, 1995)
- Pro-Lighting: Product Shots (copy editor, Art Distribution Centre Ltd., Hong Kong, 1995)
- Adobe Photoshop: A Visual Guide for the Mac (copy editor, Art Distribution Centre Ltd., 1996)
- Computer Animation Production (copy editor, Art Distribution Centre Ltd., Hong Kong, 1996)
- Pro-Lighting: Special Effects (copy editor, Art Distribution Centre Ltd., Hong Kong, 1996)
- Pro-Lighting: Interior Shots (copy editor, Art Distribution Centre Lid., Hong Kong, 1966)
- Pro-Lighting: Lingerie Shots (copy editor, Art Distribution Centre Ltd., Hong Kong, 1996)
- Digital Image Creation – Sights into the New Photography (copy editor, Art Distribution Centre Ltd., Hong Kong, 1996)
- Physics Textbooks for Secondary School Students, 14 books (co-translator, published in Hong Kong in 2001 – 2007)

==== C to E ====
- Sino-Vietnamese War (Kingsway International Publications Ltd., Hong Kong, 1981)
- Shaolin Gungfu (Kingsway International Publications Ltd., Hong Kong, 1981)
- The Story of Dayu (Kingsway International Publications Ltd., Hong Kong, 1982)
- Law Annual Report of China 1982/83 (Kingsway International Publications Ltd., 1982)
- Laws and Regulations of the PRC (volume I) (Kingsway International Publications Ltd., 1982)
- Laws and Regulations of the PRC (volume II) (Hong Kong Cultural Company, 1984)
- Album of Paintings of chairman Mao Memorial Hall (Xinhua Publishing House, Beijing, 1993)
- Selected Photos of Deng Xiaoping during his Southern Tour (Guangdong People’s Publishing House, 1983)
- New Looks of Qingxin Municipality (Qingxin City, Guangdong Province, 1993)
- Tearful Youth](copy editor, novel, e-book edition, published by Everflow Publications, Hong Kong, March 2011)
- Rainbow Bridge (novel, e-book edition, published by Everflow Publications, Hong Kong, March 2011)
- Withered Flowers (novel, e-book edition, published by Everflow Publications, Hong Kong, March 2011)
- Awful Catastrophe (novel, e-book edition, published by Everflow Publications, Hong Kong, March 2011)
- Generation Lost (novel, e-book edition, published by Everflow Publications, Hong Kong, March 2011)
- Path Finder (Fragrant Port trilogy, book 1, novel, e-book edition, published by Everflow Publications, Hong Kong, May 2011)
- Working Wonders (Fragrant Port trilogy, book 2, novel, e-book edition, published by Everflow Publications, Hong Kong, May 2011)
- Fragrant Forever (Fragrant Port trilogy, book 3, novel, e-book edition, published by Everflow Publications, Hong Kong, May 2011)
- Dear Pursuit (novel, e-book edition, published by Everflow Publications, Hong Kong, March 2011)
- An Active Modern Chinese Grammar & Translation (English version, e-book edition) (Everflow Publications, July 2011)
- Useful Chinese Words & Expressions Book One (English version) (Everflow Publications, March 2013)
- Useful Chinese Words & Expressions Book Two (English version) (Everflow Publications, March 2013)
- Useful Chinese Words & Expressions Book Three (English version) (Everflow Publications, March 2013)
- Chinese-English Comparative Studies (e-book version) (Everflow Publications, December, 2013)
- Red Memories pentalogy (e-book version) (Everflow Publications, December, 2013)
- Romance of the Fragrant Port trilogy (e-book version) (Everflow Publications, December, 2013)
- Essentials of Modern Chinese (e-book version) (Everflow Publications, April, 2014)
- Steps to Elegant Translation from E to C (e-book version) (Everflow Publications, June, 2014)
- Chinese Sentence Patterns (classified) (e-book version) (Everflow Publications, June, 2014)
- Chinese Numerals and Classifiers (e-book version) (Everflow Publications, Aug. 2014)
- Moonlight Island (Popular Science Press, Beijing, Aug. 2014)
- The Magic Flute of Tianjialin (Popular Science Press, Beijing, Aug. 2014)
- Dear Delusion (Popular Science Press, Beijing, Aug. 2014)
- The New Noah’s Ark (Popular Science Press, Beijing, Aug. 2014)
