= Morgan Wong =

Chinese artist

- Born: Wong Wing Fat; 29 January 1984 (age 42); Hong Kong, China
- Occupation: Artist
- Years active: 2006 – present

Morgan Wong Wing Fat (Chinese: 黃榮法; born in 1984) is a Hong Kong video and performance artist. His work explores durational art, time, and spacial temporality.

He was a guest lecturer of School of Creative Media at City University of Hong Kong in 2011 and part-time lecturer at Hong Kong Baptist University in 2014.

== Exhibitions ==
=== Solo exhibitions ===
- 2015 – "One Hour" Morgan Wong's Solo Exhibition, Art Basel, Hong Kong
- 2014–2015 – Opening Exhibition of Shanghai 21st Century Minsheng Art Museum
- 2013 – "Filing Down a Steel Bar Until a Needle is Made", Tintype Gallery, London, UK
- 2011– "One Hour", 2P Contemporary Art Gallery, Hong Kong,"Untitled – Agnosia Series I", Videotage, Hong Kong
- 2010 – "A Story of an Eel Chef", Oyoyo Art Center, Sapporo, Japan
- 2009 – "Once You Were Here", Para/site Art Space Central, Hong Kong

=== Group exhibitions ===
- 2015 Untitled – Expressway, Art Basel,
- 2014 After Time, Pearl Lam Galleries, Hong Kong, China
- Art Basel Hong Kong, Pearl Lam Galleries, Hong Kong, China
- Hong Kong ArtWalk 2014, Multiple Galleries, Hong Kong Contested Spaces,
- Indian Art Fair, New Deli, Hindu, 2013 18th Videobrasil, SESC Pompeia, St Paulo, Brazil
- Artists Film International, White Chapel Art Gallery, London, UK
- Move on Asia – Video Art in Asia 2002 to 2012, ZKM, Karlsruhe, Germany
- Habits, Cleavages and Fractures, UCL Geology Collections, London, UK, 2012 Gelassenheit: Letting It Be, 2P Contemporary Art Gallery, Hong Kong, China
- Hong Kong Diary, 25 Bilder/Sekunde, Mannheim, Germany
- Running on the Sidelines, Soka Art Center, Taipei, Taiwan
- MA & Other Post Graduates 2012, Atkinson Gallery, Millfield, UK,2011 China New Design, Milan Triennale Design Museum, Milan; Turin Palace Museum (Palazzo Chiablese), Turin, Italy
- Arts Centre Open House 2011, Hong Kong Arts Centre, Hong Kong, China
- Recycling Love, Blue Room, Hong Kong, China
- Move On Asia in Europe, CASA Asia, Barcelona and Madrid, Spain
- The Knife's Edge, Fremantle Art Centre, Perth, Australia
- Societe Generale Chinese Art Awards Tour Exhibition, Shanghai Library, Shanghai, China; Huashan
- 1914, Taipei, Taiwan; Artistree, Hong Kong, China; One Raffles Quay, Singapore

== Awards ==
- Shortlisted in The Sovereign Asian Art Prize in 2012, Hong Kong Art Biennale in 2010
- 2010 Shortlisted in Hong Kong Art Biennale
- 2009 Shortlisted in Hong Kong Contemporary Art Biennale Award
- Winner of the 2008 Silver Award for Single Screen-based Interactive Media Category at the Hong Kong Independent Film & Video Awards

== Publications ==
=== Books ===
- Hong Kong Eye: Hong Kong Contemporary Art, 2012, Skira Editore, ISBN 978-8-85721-461-0, pp. 310 – 313
- Hong Kong Artists: 20 Portraits, 2012, Verlag für moderne Kunst, ISBN 978-3-86984-322-3, pp. 194 – 201

=== Exhibition catalogues ===
- Move on Asia 2004 – 2013, Alt Space Loop, ISBN 978-89-963389-3-2, pp. 308–309
- Fictional Recoveries 2012, Pearl Lam Galleries, pp. 12–15

=== Newspapers/magazines/websites ===
- South China Morning Post, "West Kowloon arts hub sees end to design contests", by Vivienne Chow, 23 May 2013
- South China Morning Post, "Four Hongkongers in running for Sovereign Asian Art Prize", by Vivienne Chow, 31 January 2013
- South China Morning Post, "Getting into the Frame", by Vivienne Chow, A4 Focus, 8 July 2012
- The Guardian,"Top 10 art galleries in Hong Kong", by Mary Agnew, 4 July 2012
- Timeout Hong Kong, "Gelassenheit: Letting It Be", by Piper Koh, 11 April 2012
- Pipeline, "An Hour of Experience Fitted into Hong Kong Trickiest Shaped Gallery" by David Boyce, pp. 49 – 50, Oct 2011
- Ming Pao Weekly, "Lost in Space-Time", by Kwan Yee Chan, p. 96, Issue 2238, Oct 2011
- Timeout Hong Kong, "Inner Visions", by Fiona Ng, p. 57, Issue 82, Jun 2011
- Yishu Journal of Contemporary Chinese Art, "Four Discussions with Hong Kong Artists: Leung Chi Wo, Lam Tung Pang, Morgan Wong, Lee Kit" by Stephanie Bailey, pp. 80 – 83, Volume 10 Number 3, May/ Jun 2011
- Hong Kong Gallery Guide, "Revealing Links in Time", by Cristina Sanchez Kozyreva, pp. 74–75, Issue 19, May 2011
- The West Australian, "Video Art Comes of Age", by Donal Fitzpatrick, p. 7, 25 March 2011
