= Luke Hunt =

Australian journalist

Luke Anthony Hunt (born 2 July 1962) is an Australian journalist, war correspondent and academic.

== Biography ==
Hunt was born in Caulfield, Victoria, to Winifred Monica Hunt (née Hayes) and Brian James Hunt, in 1962. He attended Mazenod College and Deakin University, where he obtained a Bachelor of Arts in journalism and a Masters of Arts in defence, and was named editor of the student newspaper Planet.

Hunt was hired by the Australian Associated Press (AAP) as a cadet and moved quickly through the ranks in Melbourne, Sydney and Canberra before joining Agence France-Presse (AFP) in Hong Kong, where he covered the end of the British empire and was dispatched to Afghanistan as bureau chief during Taliban rule.

Hunt covered Taliban offensives in 1997 and 1998, launched against Ahmad Shah Masood and his Northern Alliance. While there he was charged with espionage and told by Taliban Information Minister Mutmaeen Mutawakkil he would "be executed on the football pitch" in Kabul. However, Hunt was found not guilty in a Sharia court after a lengthy interrogation and was later commended by the United Nations special envoy Lahkdar Brahimi for the 'best and most insightful' coverage of the civil war.

He returned to cover the US invasion and occupation of Afghanistan following the September 11 attacks and was embedded with the 1st Marine Expeditionary Forces during the invasion of Iraq where he rose in prominence with his coverage for AFP and CNN as marines crossed the Diyala River and entered Baghdad. He was embedded with the 101st Airborne Division on a second tour later the same year.

Asked in Kuwait why the US was invading Iraq, Hunt replied: "There's beer in Baghdad" amid a gaggle of war correspondents. "It became a battle cry for reporters sent to this dusty, alcohol-free region so far from home."

Hunt has covered the Indian/Pakistan conflict over Kashmir, the Sri Lankan civil war and the border conflict between Thailand and Cambodia, which erupted at Preah Vihear in early 2008 when Hunt became a freelancer. He has also covered the ongoing running Khmer Rouge Tribunal since its inception.

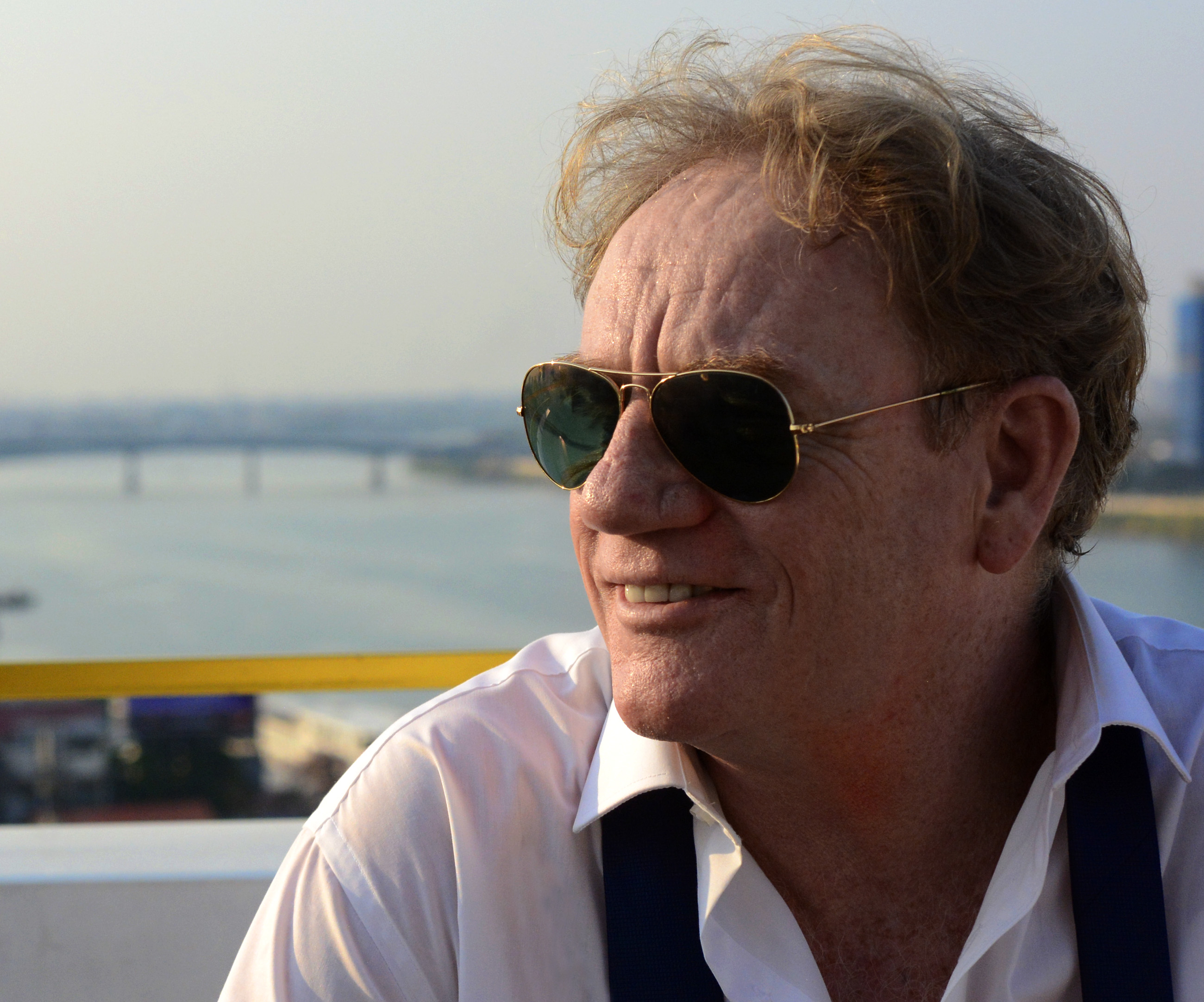
Luke Hunt pictured in Phnom Penh, 2019

He has since written for Time magazine, Far East Economic Review, The Times of London, The Economist, The New York Times, The Associated Press, The Washington Times and The Age in Melbourne.

Hunt has maintained a sharp focus on Indochina since arriving in Vietnam as the Cold War was ending. His exclusive interviews with Gen. Pham Xuan An, Gen. Tran Van Tra, Tran Bach Dang and Khieu Samphan led to the publication of his second book The Punji Trap.

However, it was his experience in Afghanistan that enabled him to specialise in counter-terrorism and jihadi groups, like Jemaah Islamiyah, in Southeast Asia spending four years based out of Malaysian Borneo and a further seven years working from Cambodia.

In Phnom Penh, Hunt was appointed as an academic program professor by Pannasastra University where he wrote the course War, Media and International Relations. He writes regularly about Southeast Asian affairs for UCAsia News and The Diplomat, reports for Voice of America and AAP, and is a regular on radio in Australia and Hong Kong.

Hunt is a former president and life member of the Overseas Press Club of Cambodia. He is also a founding member of the Foreign Correspondents Club of Malaysia and a former board member of the Foreign Correspondents Club in Hong Kong.

In his work for The Diplomat, Hunt hosts a semi-regular podcast where he talks to journalists, academics and Southeast Asian specialists.

== Awards ==
- Shared, Certificate of Special Merit for Outstanding Contribution, Hong Kong Human Rights Press Awards 2015
- Finalist Society of Publishers in Asia (SOPA) 2015
- Gold prize SOPA, Excellence in Human Rights Reporting 2014
- Gold prize (shared) World Association of Newspapers best feature 2013

== Publications ==
- Barings Lost: Nick Leeson and the collapse of Barings plc (1996, with Karen Heinrich)
- Punji Trap: Pham Xuan An, the spy who didn't love us (2018)
