= Chao Yat =

Hong Kong comics artist

Chao Yat 草日
- Born: May 21, 1968 (age 58) Hong Kong

Chao Yat (草日, born 21 May 1968) is a Hong Kong comics artist, his comics first appeared in Ming Pao in 1991.

Subsequent works appeared in Sing Pao, Oriental Daily and Hong Kong Economic Times.

Since then, his published comics include Sam's Manhua Series and Leung's Saga Series.
