= Cheung Kam Ching =

Chinese philosopher in Hong Kong

Professor "Leo" Cheung Kam Ching (張錦青, born 1963) is a philosopher in Hong Kong. He is a professor of the Department of Philosophy, The Chinese University of Hong Kong (CUHK) since Jan 2011. He was a professor of the Department of Religion and Philosophy, Hong Kong Baptist University (HKBU) from 2008 to 2011, Assistant Professor (1995–2000), Associate Professor (2000–2008) and the Head of Department (2006–2007).

During his secondary education, Cheung attended St Francis Xavier's School Tsuen Wan. Then he attended the Department of Mathematics, Chinese University of Hong Kong and obtained his PhD at University of Sussex in 1993. His research interest is Wittgenstein's Philosophy, Philosophy of Language, Philosophy of Science, Chinese Philosophy and Comparative Philosophy.

Cheung gained The President's Award for Outstanding Performance in Teaching at Hong Kong Baptist University in 2003; he also was a Visiting Scholarship to Faculty of Philosophy, University of Cambridge at 2003 and Visiting Fellowship to Harris Manchester College, University of Oxford at 2000.

Preceded by: Professor Lo Ping Cheung	Head, Department of Religion and philosophy, Hong Kong Baptist University; 2006–2007	Succeeded by: Dr. Kai-man Kwan (Acting)
