= Shawn Liao =

Shih-Siang Shawn Liao (Traditional Chinese: 廖士翔, Simplified Chinese: 廖士翔, Pinyin: Liao Shixiang, born on October 18, 1974) is a former basketball player from the People's Republic of China best known for being one of the first Asian basketball athletes to ever compete in NCAA Division I basketball for Long Island University (from 1993 to 1996). He is 1.70 m (5 ft 7 in) tall and weighs 70 kilograms (150 pounds). Liao later transferred to Columbia University (1996–1999) but did not play collegiate basketball for the school. He majored in chemical engineering and economics. He is also an alumnus of Christ Church College at Oxford University (1997).

In 2007 China Basketball Museum (CBM), China's equivalent of USA's Basketball Hall of Fame, announced the top 10 most influential Chinese basketball players in China's basketball history. Liao was ranked as number 9 amongst his basketball peers.

Liao is currently a successful entrepreneur in New York City with major focus in the area of private-equity and real estate investments; and co-founded several Hydra companies with equity interests in real estate, technology, petrochemical, media and entertainment industries worldwide.

== Personal life ==
The Liao's hosted their wedding on July 14, 2006, in China. The couple was married by the NBA legend, Bill Russell, in a private ceremony with close friends & family at the National Palace Museum. His wife is a corporate attorney in New York and Hong Kong. They were divorced in 2009.

Liao quoted during his three-day wedding event that "In my mind.... by having Bill to officiate and be the honored witness to our wedding is basically my 'Hall of Fame.'"

== Other interests ==
Liao is an avid fan of the performing arts and has been actively involved in producing theater productions and sponsoring various traditional Chinese artists from China to perform in New York City. Liao was the mastermind behind the largest Chinese opera production ever performed outside of Mainland China. The two-day weekend event, held on September 5–6, 2003, was billed as "SilkROAD2003: An Experience in Chinese Theater", led by one of the most popular modern Chinese opera stars, Li Baochun — son of one of the most acclaimed Chinese opera legends, Li Shaochun, and received a near sellout audience of over 5,000 plus at Lincoln Center's Avery Fisher Hall. The production received a favorable review by New York Times acclaimed opera critic James R. Oestreich. Prior to the event, an average Chinese opera performance in North America did not exceed no more than 800 attendees per performance. SilkROAD2003 was co-produced by one of Liao's companies, Hydra Ventures, along with a family friend, Taiwan's billionaire tycoon Koo Chen-fu, and his non-profit foundation, called the Koo Foundation. For Liao's "important contributions he has made to the cultural life of New York City," as quoted by City Coucilman John Liu, the New York City Council offered to present Liao with a Proclamation. Liao declined to personally receive this honor and requested instead that the New York City government present the Proclamation to all of his colleagues at Hydra Ventures.

In January 2004, Liao was also involved in a musical production with the world renown cellist, Yo-Yo Ma, Silk Road Project, and Peabody Essex Museum in the presentation of "Creative Exchanges: Sights and Sounds of the Silk Road," a series of innovative performance, educational and cultural activities at PEM's newly transformed museum of art and culture. Additionally, Liao sponsored a popular Chinese opera artist, Wu Hsing-Kuo, to perform the role of the Ying-Yang Master alongside the opera legend, Plácido Domingo, in the 2006 international premier of "The First Emperor" opera production at the famed Lincoln Center Metropolitan Opera House. The First Emperor's production team included China's leading film director, Zhang Yimou, and Academy Award composer, Tan Dun.

== Controversy ==
In November 2006, just prior to the fallout of the 2007-2008 Wall Street financial crisis and the global economic meltdown, Liao authorized one of his companies, which was managing his mother-in-law's real estate portfolio to utilize a portion of such assets to meet the company's operating expenses, payroll and holiday bonus commitments for employees. A family scandal ensued as a result of this misappropriation of funds. This led to a complaint being filed to the District Attorney's office and was followed by a government investigation of this one company. An out-of-court agreement was eventually reached between all parties involved.

In the meantime, after nearly three years of investigation and negotiation, the government refused to dismiss its case against Liao. The District Attorney's office leveraged this family scandal as an opportunity to lead a public crusade to clean up Wall Street's management irregularities by corporate executives. As a result of intense media coverage in the United States and China, and an opportunity to garner publicity for the government, the District Attorney was able to successfully force an unusually lengthy and severe plea agreement in the matter of People v. Liao - by arguing that "although a family matter, notwithstanding, no act is justifiable when an offense in law was committed."

== Family history ==
Liao's grandfather, Liao Zhong-Mai (1912–1975), who was educated in Japan and a sugarcane tycoon, became one of the first legislators in China to be elected without the backing of the Communist Party or the Nationalist Party, a position he held for a record six consecutive legislative terms. Considered the patriarch of the Liao clan in southern China, including Hong Kong and Taiwan, he was lionized as a daring independent politician and a revolutionary political voice during China's various experimental phases with grassroots democracy in the turbulent era of the 1940s through 1960s.

Liao is a descendant of a direct line of ancestry from the Zhang-Zhou Prefecture in Fujian Province. The official record placed a man bearing a surname, Zhang, as the first generation of this lineage. Record shows that on or about the 1360s (the period between the Yuan Dynasty, 1271–1368, and the Ming Dynasty, 1368–1644), Zhang Yuan-Zi, a scholar from a family of limited means, was solicited (married into the family) to become the husband to the only daughter of a wealthy Liao family. The couple only gave birth to one son. Soon after, an agreement was struck between the two families, Zhang and Liao, that all future generations to follow must "live on earth as Liao, and rest in eternity as Zhang." This pact, in effect, was meant to preserve the legacy of the Liao family, while never forget the hereditary origin of the founding Zhang patriarch.

Liao is the 21st generation of the Zhang-Liao lineage. Just like all of his forefathers, he will one day revert to the full name of "Zhang Shixiang" or "Shih-Siang Shawn Zhang".

== Trivia ==
- Liao played NCAA Division I collegiate basketball during the same period that the more high profiled China national basketball team member, Ma Jian, played for the University of Utah from 1993 to 1995. At the time, Ma was projected to be the first Chinese basketball player to enter the NBA (he was cut by the Los Angeles Clippers in 1995). Both players were the only Asians playing NCAA Division I collegiate basketball in the early 1990s. Ma and Liao were considered pioneers who cleared the way for other players from China to enter the NBA, such as Wang Zhizhi, Yao Ming, and Mengke Bateer.
