= Cheng Ting Ting =

Hong Kong contemporary artist

- Born: 1990 (age 35–36)
- Education: Hong Kong Baptist University
- Website: Official Website

Cheng Ting Ting (Chinese: 鄭婷婷; b. 1990) is a contemporary artist from Hong Kong. Her work includes primarily oil paintings and drawings, but also prints, artists' books, collages and projections. Cheng’s works are personal and often feature memories from her childhood and adolescence, as well as sights and objects from her daily life. She currently lives and works in Hong Kong and Norway. Her work has been exhibited at public and independent institutions including Tai Kwun Contemporary, Para Site in Hong Kong and the Power Station of Art in Shanghai.

== Early life and education ==
Cheng Ting Ting was born in 1990 and grew up in the Sha Tin District of Hong Kong. Cheng’s affinity for art began at an early age, and she studied visual arts in high school and at university. As a third-year university student, she participated in an exchange programme at Accademia di Belle Arti di Bologna in Bologna, Italy. Cheng said this experience had a significant impact on her road to self-discovery. In 2013, Cheng graduated with a BA in Visual Arts from the Academy of Visual Arts, Hong Kong Baptist University and won the AVA Award at the graduation exhibition. After graduation, she worked as a full-time assistant designer at a marketing and communications firm.

Cheng is currently a full-time artist with a studio in Fo Tan, Hong Kong. She also teaches art to young children ages two to four at Art in Hospital on a part-time basis.

== Artistic practice ==
Cheng draws inspiration from her daily life and uses her personal experiences to reflect on and make connections to larger themes. Her works often involve childhood memories and deal with feelings of isolation and detachment. Cheng paints from visual memory and employs dynamic brush strokes and varied colour palettes to depict people, objects and events. Cheng's works are often described as "autobiographical" because she prefers conveying surreal, personal impressions of her subjects rather than realistic portrayals. According to the description of her most recent solo exhibition Recipient Absent (2019), Cheng's paintings become "tools to investigate her own condition and place in the world.”

In her solo exhibition Fall In Fall Out (2017), Cheng explored the conflicting desires between individuality and social conformity. In her solo exhibition Enfante (2017), she examined the disconnect between her adult and younger self and employed childlike techniques and colors, drawing upon her observations as an art educator for young children and her own childhood memories.

Cheng states that she chooses to paint in oil because she enjoys its slow and abstract process and its relative passivity compared to other art forms, such as installation or multimedia arts. She has said: “...painting is passive, there is a safe distance between the art and viewer. Sometimes, with more conceptual art, you feel that the artist is trying to push you to look at the work through a certain prism.” Cheng's painting process includes making rough sketches first, then outlining the composition on the canvas. She said her pieces are not created with a predetermined theme or concept." Cheng cites twentieth-century Italian painter Giorgio Morandi, who is best known for his contemplative still-life paintings, as an inspiration. Cheng also regularly sketches in ink and pencil.

== Exhibitions ==
Cheng's solo exhibitions include Recipient Absent, Gallery EXIT, Hong Kong (2019); Enfante, chi art space, Hong Kong (2017); Fall In Fall Out, Gallery EXIT, Hong Kong (2017); and Open Close Quotation, Wan Fung Art Gallery, Hong Kong (2015).

Her works have been shown in various group exhibitions, including Very Natural Actions, Tai Kwun Contemporary, Hong Kong (2019); Yummy Gummy, Tomorrow Maybe, Hong Kong (2019); Shek-O Sublime, Gallery EXIT, Hong Kong (2019); A Tree Fell in the Forest, and No One’s There, Power Station of Art, Shanghai (2018); The Pendulant Mass, Galerie Ovo, Taipei (2016); Blindspot Gallery, Hong Kong (2016); The Imaginary Order, Gallery EXIT, Hong Kong (2016); Imagine there’s no country, Above us only our cities, Para Site, Hong Kong (2015); According to ‘Them’, Jockey Club Creative Arts Centre L0 Gallery, Hong Kong (2014).
