= Lam Tung Pang =

Hong Kong artist

- Chinese: 林東鵬
- Education: CUHK, Central Saint Martins College of Art and Design
- Known for: Large-scale paintings and unconventional painting methods.

Lam Tung Pang
- Notable work: Past Continuous Tense, Landscape of Travel and Leisure, The Huge Mountain, Antique series, Polar Bear series, etc.
- Style: Painting and drawing on plywood
- Awards: Young Artist of the Year (Hunting Art Prize), Best Artist in Visual Arts (Hong Kong Arts Development Awards), etc.
- Website: Official website

Lam Tung Pang (Chinese: 林東鵬) is a Hong Kong artist, and one of the founders of the Fotanian art movement in Hong Kong. He lives and works in London and Hong Kong. His work mainly focuses on themes such as collective memory and humanity.

Lam's artworks are a combination of traditional (oil, acrylic, charcoal, and pencil) and non-traditional (nails, sand, and plywood) materials to explores the relationship between objects and materials.

== First studio ==
During his college years, Lam struggled with creativity, stating that, "When no one gives you a topic, you have to come up with something out of nothing". His main struggle was with time management. During his second year at college, he wanted freedom from the school's expectations. His desire was to control his own pace, as he was aware that college was a temporary aspect of his life. "What would I do in the future? Actually, no one cared. There are a lot of possible paths or you can just wander aimlessly", said Lam.

Lam decided to rent a place as a studio in Fo Tan with friends. At that time, he consciously set about making art his career.

== Studying in London ==
After graduating from the Chinese University of Hong Kong in 2002, Lam Tung Pang's focus remained on creating art.

In 2003, he decided to leave Hong Kong on a scholarship to study for a Master of Arts degree at Central Saint Martins College of Art and Design in London and completed the degree in 2004. During his time studying in London, he resided in a friend's living room, which he found to be a struggle but regards it as the most valuable experience ever.

He did not do part-time job because he preferred to live simply not to waste time and money so that he could have full control of his time. By his second year in London, he had used up all his funding but claims he had the greatest freedom at that time. With the luxury and freedom of time, Lam felt he could see different things.

In 2005, Lam became the first Chinese artist to win the Hunting Art Prize in the UK. He is also one of the few Hong Kong artists to have exhibited at the Tate Modern, an internationally acclaimed modern art museum.

Lam received further recognition in 2009 when he became the recipient of Hong Kong Contemporary Art Biennial Awards.

== Lam's artworks creation ==
=== Observation ===
Lam Tung Pang's works are based on his observations of his surroundings.

When he was in London, Lam visited local museums to see the originals of works of art he had seen in textbooks. Back in Hong Kong, he re-thought how to integrate his creative work in his surroundings in order to establish a closer relationship. He discovered that Hong Kong has a wealth of creative work and artistic resources. He was inspired to explore Hollywood Road in Sheung Wan and the Hong Kong Heritage Museum in Shatin where he saw ancient pottery statues, leading him to develop his "Antique" series.

=== Environment ===
Lam's collections include re-imaginings of the living environment of the population, or as a metaphor for his own environment and as an exploration of the ultimate urban existence, contributing to Lam's research for the ideal way to live.

Lam expresses his observation and concerns in his works regarding the environment, life and culture. Lam has created various works about polar bears to visually represent similarities between the environment of polar bears and humans. Lam believed that the state of being a polar bear could be very similar to the environment that each of the individuals lived in.

== Exhibitions ==
Lam Tung Pang has exhibited his work worldwide and has worked in both private and public collections, including Deutsche Bank and the Hong Kong Museum of Art. He has been commissioned by the Legislative Council of Hong Kong.

=== Solo exhibitions ===
Year	Exhibitions
2015	The Curiosity Box – Hometown tourist, Hong Kong
2014	Play, Espace Louis Vuitton Hong Kong
2013	The Curiosity Box, Chinese Culture Center, San Francisco, U.S.A
2012	Past Continuous Tense – new works by Lam Tung-pang, Goethe-Institut, Hong Kong
2011	Lam Tung-pang: Long View Under Scrutiny, Hanart T Z Gallery, Hong Kong Artists in the Neighbourhood Scheme V: The Drawing Observatory – Works by Lam Tung-pang, Exhibition Gallery 4–5, Hong Kong Central Library, Hong Kong
2010	Diorama – Painting and Mixed-media, Hanart T Z Gallery, Hong Kong Animals come to Town – Works by Lam Tung-pang, Times Square, Hong Kong
2008	New Paintings by Lam Tung Pang, Hanart T Z Gallery, Hong Kong City Projects: Where is my Mum? Hong Kong, London, Beijing, EXHIBIT, CHINA NOW and the London Festival of Architecture 2008, London, England Young Asian Artists Solo, China International Gallery Exposition 2008, Beijing, China
2007	Studio – Hong Kong London, Commercial Press Book Centre and Joint Publishing Book Café, Hong Kong
2006	West Journey – Works by Tung-pang Lam, OC Gallery & Central Plaza, Hong Kong Chinese Arts Centre, Manchester, England Mind the Gap, Toni Heath Gallery, London, England
2005	Resonate II, Wah Luen Industrial Centre, Fo Tan, Hong Kong Resonate I, Grotto Fine Art, Hong Kong Breath, Toni Heath Gallery, London, England Window Gallery, London, England

=== Group exhibitions ===
Year	Exhibitions
2015	The Past is Continuing, Hong Kong Heritage Museum, Hong Kong
2013	Hong Kong Contemporary Art Awards 2012, Hong Kong Museum of Art, Hong Kong The Origin of Dao: New Dimensions in Chinese Contemporary Art, Hong Kong Museum of Art, Hong Kong Intelligence Infinity: Inspiration through Art, Hong Kong Heritage Museum, Hong Kong I Think It Rains, Cattle Depot Artist Village, Hong Kong Hong Kong Eye, ArtisTree, Hong Kong Painting on and on 3 – Melting Pot, School of Creative Media, City University of Hong Kong
2012	The Best of Times, The Worst of Times. Rebirth and Apocalypse in Contemporary Art, Kiev Biennale, Ukraine Hong Kong Eye, Saatchi Gallery, UK
2011	Vision of Nature: Lost & Found in Asian Contemporary Art, Hong Kong Arts Centre, Hong Kong Legacy and Creations – "Ink Art vs Ink Art" and "Art vs Art", Hong Kong Museum of Art, Hong Kong Artists in the Neighbourhood Scheme V Launching Exhibition, City Hall, Hong Kong
2010	No soul for Sale, Tate Modern New Vision: New Colours, Hong Kong Museum of Art Hong Kong Contemporary Art Biennial Awards 2009, Hong Kong Museum of Art, Hong Kong Legacy and Creations: Art vs Art – Museum of Contemporary Art Shanghai, China The Linear Dimension – Contemporary Hong Kong Art, Grotto Fine Art Ltd, Hong Kong
2009	Figurativeness and Abstract – Contemporary Oil Paintings, Watercolours and Prints of Hong Kong, Hong Kong Central Library, Hong Kong
2008	Hong Kong Hong Kong, Hanart T Z Gallery, Hong Kong Departure – Contemporary Art Exhibition of Guangzhou, Shenzhen, Hong Kong and Macau, He Xiangning Art Museum, OCT Contemporary Art Terminal, China October Contemporary 2008, Hong Kong Hong Kong International Arts and Antiques Fair 2008, Hong Kong Convention and Exhibition Centre, Hong Kong UK Alumni – The Celebration 60, British Council, London & Hong Kong Hong Kong • Arts • Centre – HKAC 30th Anniversary Exhibition, Hong Kong Arts Centre Inside Looking Out, Osage Singapore, Singapore HK Unveiled – Contemporary Art in the S.A.R., Atting House, Hong Kong Beautiful Journey, Beautiful World, An Art Container Project, Hong Kong
2007	Some Rooms, Osage Kwun Tong, Hong Kong Inside Looking Out, Osage Beijing, Beijing Reversing Horizons, Artist Reflections of the Hong Kong Handover 10th Anniversary, Museum of Contemporary Art Shanghai, China ChinaPaintings by Lam Tung Pang and Xue Jun, Hanart T Z Gallery, Hong Kong Drawing Exhibition on Paper, Too Art, Hong Kong Arts Centre Philippe Charriol Foundation Art Competition Finalist Exhibition, Philippe Charriol Foundation, Taikoo Place, Artist Commune and Cityplaza, Hong Kong Inside Looking Out, Osage Gallery, Hong Kong Sport as Art – Li-Ning X HK Creative People, Hong Kong Fashion Week, The Hong Kong Convention and Exhibition Centre, Hong Kong Fotanian: Fotan Artists Open Studios 2007, Hong Kong
2006	Sovereign Asian Art Prize Finalist Exhibition, Sovereign Art Foundation, Lane Crawford and International Finance Centre, Hong Kong Shanghai Art Fair Emerging Artists Exhibition 2006, Shanghai, China London Art Fair 2006, London, England
2005	Small is Beautiful XXIII, Flower Central, London, England Manchester Art Show 2005, Manchester, England Hunting Art Prize gala, Finalist Exhibition, Royal College of Art, London, England M.A. and other Post Graduates Contemporary Art Exhibition, Atkinson Gallery, England
2004	Small is Beautiful XXII, Flower Central, London, England The 8th Chichester open Art Exhibition, Minerva, Chichester Festival Theatre, England The Inscriptive Ferret, Space 44, London, England
2003	Fotanian: Fotan Artists Open Studios 2003, Hong Kong Hong Kong Art Biennial 2003, Hong Kong Museum of Art, Hong Kong Ka Folk Restaurant, Shanghai Street Artspace, Hong Kong A Time Like This... – SARS Exhibition, Pao Galleries, Hong Kong Arts Centre Allen and Overy Art Exhibition, Allen and Overy, Hong Kong Landscape of Mind: Paintings by Chan Sau-nam & Lam Tung-pang, Grotto Fine Art Ltd, Hong Kong
2002	Triple Play, 1aspace, Cattle Depot Artist Village, Hong Kong
2001	318 Opening Show, Wah Luen Industrial Centre, Hong Kong Nokia Arts Awards-Asia Pacific 2000-Playground of Your Imagination, Insa Art Center, Seoul, South Korea

=== Exhibitions ===
Play, Espace Louis Vuitton Hong Kong in 2014

In PLAY, Lam utilizes toys to create large-scale paintings and installations. Lam sought to address how toys often reflect the "utopia" of a child's mind, and to contrast it with an adult perspective, which he saw as being complicated through accumulated life experiences. Lam sought to pose questions about artistic and creative processes through the act of playing.

The exhibition highlights Lam's study of materials. The artist collects toys from his private domestic environment as well as travel journeys. Curating a miniature museum that documents our systems of learning, the exhibition space features toy installations, that are a result of highly personal encounters. Playing with these found objects raises questions about growth, human experiences and the development of the adult mind, ideas which provide continuous inspiration to the artist.

Long View Under Scrutiny, Hanart TZ Gallery, Hong Kong in 2011

Developed as an extension of the Diorama series presented in 2010, Long View Under Scrutiny exhibits new work that continues Lams reflection upon self and environment. Investigating a culturally acquired perception of memory in comparison to reality in this exhibition, Lam placed one of his personal works, Folding (2006), a self-portrait within a hinged wood box created during his four years living in London, alongside his creations, including The Youngest and the Oldest (2011), a five-panel work on plywood.

== Awards ==
Year	Award
2014	Best Artist (Visual Arts), Hong Kong Arts Development Awards (2013)
2012	Outstanding contributions to the development of culture and arts by The Secretary for Home Affairs, Hong Kong. Asian Cultural Council Fellowship
2009	Hong Kong Contemporary Art Biennial Awards
2007	Finalists, Philippe Charriol Foundation Art Competition
2006	The Schoeni Prize, Sovereign Asian Art Prizes
2005	Young Artist of the Year, Hunting Art Prize, UK
2004	Young Artists Prize, Chichester Open Art, UK
2003	Arts Scholarships, Hong Kong Arts Development Council, Hong Kong
2002	Raymond Wood Creative Prize, The Chinese University of Hong Kong
2001	Cheung's Fine Arts Awards, The Chinese University of Hong Kong
2000	Nokia Art Awards-Asia Pacific 2000 Hong Kong Finalist & Outstanding Artistic Expression, the Nokia Art Awards-Asia Pacific 2000
