= Mira (YouTuber) =

Hong Kong YouTuber and businesswoman

Mira 嚴嘉欣
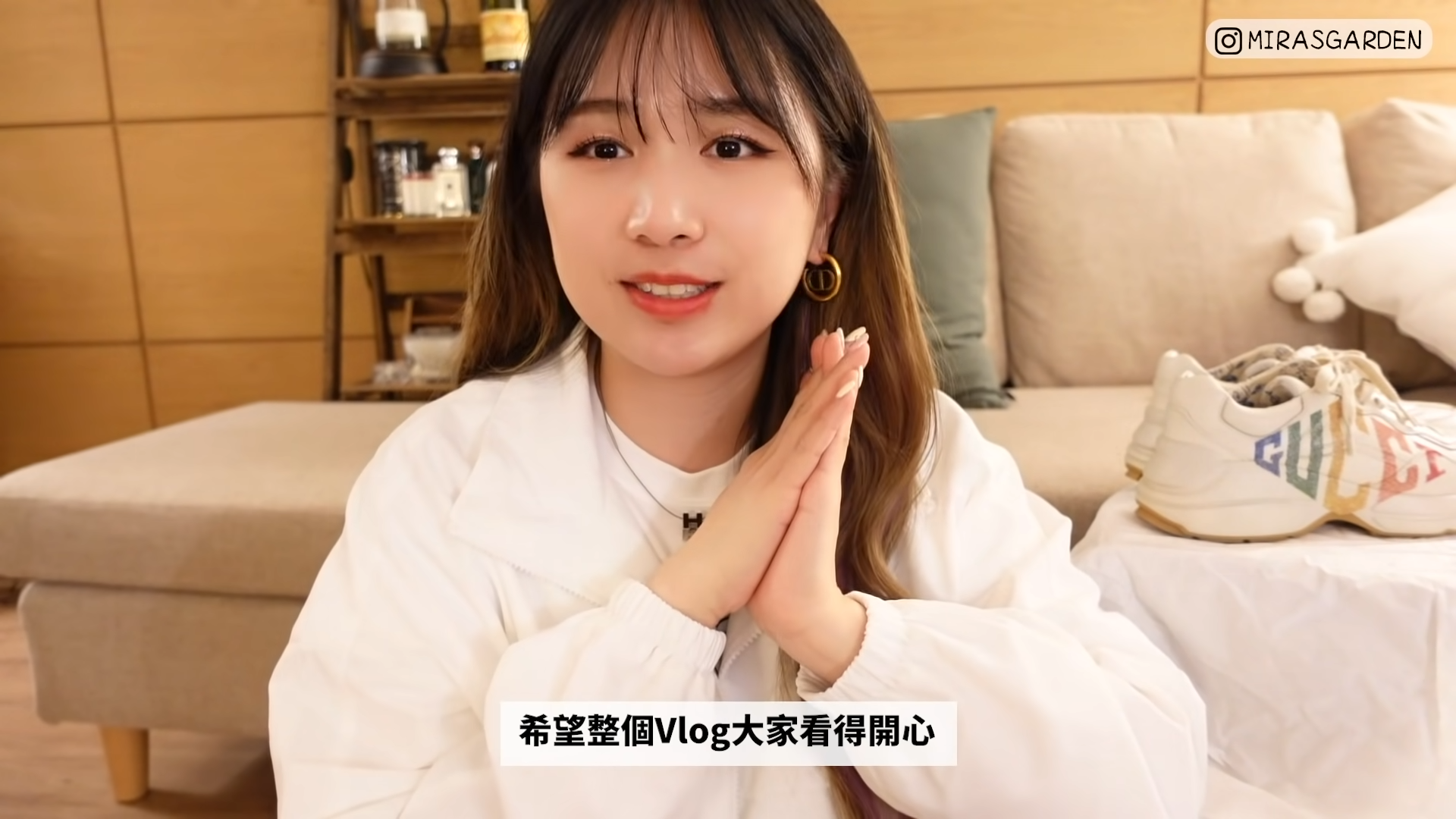
- Mira in a YouTube vlog on 3 April 2021
- Born: 7 October 1992 (age 33); Hong Kong

YouTube information
- Channel: Mira's Garden
- Years active: 2016–present
- Genres: Lifestyle; travelling
- Subscribers: 742 thousand
- Views: 201 million

Chinese name
- Traditional Chinese: 嚴嘉欣
- Simplified Chinese: 严嘉欣
Transcriptions
Standard Mandarin
- Hanyu Pinyin: Yán Jiāxīn
Yue: Cantonese
- Jyutping: Jim^{4} Gaa^{1} Jan^{1}

Mira
- Chinese: 咪拉
Transcriptions
Standard Mandarin
- Hanyu Pinyin: Mīlā
Yue: Cantonese
- Jyutping: Mi^{1} Laai^{1}
- Last updated: 4 August 2026

Yim Ka-yin (traditional Chinese: 嚴嘉欣; simplified Chinese: 严嘉欣; born 7 October 1992), known professionally as Mira (Chinese: 咪拉), is a Hong Kong YouTuber and businesswoman. She makes videos about her life in South Korea.

After spending three months self-studying Korean in Hong Kong, Mira moved in 2015 to South Korea, where she took classes at Sogang University's language school. In 2016, she started a YouTube channel called "Mira's Garden", where she covered life in South Korea, South Korean culture, and her travels. At the beginning of 2021, she founded Mongcow, an e-commerce business where she sold Mira-curated South Korean products and Mira-branded products. In November 2021, Mira started Hong Kong Fusion, a Hong Kong-style restaurant in Seoul. That year, her YouTube channel was the seventh most-subscribed Hong Kong YouTube channel with 730,000 subscribers.

== Early life and education ==
Mira was born on 7 October 1992 in Hong Kong. She recalled that when she was six or seven years old, her mother went out to buy food and was able to purchase only a small box of char siu rice. Looking back on that incident, she reflected that her family's finances during her youth were in a challenging state. While living in Hong Kong, she self-studied the Korean language for three months before moving to South Korea, where she studied at Sogang University's language school for half a year in 2014. (Note: For her learning Korean in Hong Kong for three months before moving to South Korea; For her self-studying Korean; For her attending Sogang University's language school; For her studying at a South Korean language school for half a year in 2014) Her interest in learning the Korean language was inspired by encounters with South Korean customers while she was working in Hong Kong. She learned the language out of personal interest and did not have any plans about what to do with that knowledge. After finishing her studies at Sogang University, she returned to Hong Kong for a year before going back to live in South Korea in 2016. By 2018, she had become fluent in Korean.

== YouTube channel and career ==
Mira's South Korea lifestyle vlog published on 27 February 2020. In the video, she deals with a Korean visa, meets with a YouTube manager, shops online, responds to YouTube comments, and cooks and eats food.

Mira started a YouTube channel in June 2016. In a rush to create the YouTube channel, she chose the name "Mira's Garden" because she wanted to create a space that was her own. A previous channel she considered was "Mira's Secret". Mira said that a downside in her choice of channel name was that including an apostrophe made it harder to search for. She observed other people use their first name and surname as their YouTube channels. Despite harbouring regret over her choice of channel name, Mira decided to keep it unchanged owing to the long time she had used it. At its inception, the channel covered her life in South Korea before discussing her travels to other places in the region. She covered food and South Korean culture in her videos. Video topics include how to become acquaintances with a Korean "oppa" and reasons a person should not date Korean men. In 2017, she visited a juice store in Jiufen in Taiwan, to purchase red guava juice. To test the theory that Taiwanese clerks could understand and speak Korean to be able to interact with tourists, she spoke Korean to the clerk, who responded back in Korean. In 2021, Mira visited the shantytown Guryong Village, which is near the affluent Gangnam District, and interviewed inhabitants to show how poverty-stricken and wealthy South Koreans live. At the end of 2021, Mira's Garden with 730,000 subscribers was the seventh most-subscribed Hong Kong YouTube channel.

One year into running the channel, she was making a monthly income of US$2,500. Her travel videos make her the most money. Mira signed a contract with a company to help her manage sponsorships. For a channel with 200,000 subscribers, she said in 2022 that a YouTuber could make HK$50,000 (US$6,435) from an advertisement. She accrued over 500,000 subscribers by 2018. The publication Gotrip attributed her channel's fast growth to her uploading one video a day, seven days a week, at 10:00 pm. Mira's consistent uploads gave viewers the impression that she is a friend who is talking to them every day about life, Gotrip said. She adds both Chinese and Korean subtitles for her videos, allowing South Korean viewers to understand videos in which she speaks Chinese. She hired a film editor to add Chinese subtitles and music, while she adds the Korean subtitles herself. Mira calls her viewers "little bees" (Chinese: 小蜜蜂).

Beginning in 2017, Mira was asked by the Korea Tourism Organization to be a spokeswoman for Michelin starred restaurants in South Korea. Filming herself eating at numerous restaurants, she made videos featuring herself eating gejang and Hanwoo. Each video received over 100,000 views. In 2021, she wrote an article for Apple Daily in which she conducted street interviews with people in South Korea asking their opinions about the boy band Mirror.

== Business career ==
=== Mongcow ===
During the COVID-19 pandemic, Hong Kong people were unable to travel. Capitalising on this situation, Mira prepared for several months before launching Mongcow, an e-commerce store for consumers to purchase South Korean food products, at the beginning of 2021. Mongcow sells both Mira-curated South Korean products and Mira-branded products. Customers purchased over 15,000 cans of instant crab marinated in soy sauce in the first week that she launched her first branded product, Ding Hai Fan Ying (Chinese: 丁蟹飯應). Stored in warehouses kept at −18 °C (0 °F), frozen food products like the instant crab are delivered to Hong Kong and sent to various locations using refrigerated trucks. She partnered with One Hundred Years Native Samgyetang, a restaurant thrice recommended by the Michelin Guide, to sell samgye-tang dumplings. After she created a video to promote the product, the company had sold 12,000 packs of dumplings by April 2021. In her business's first quarter, she had HK$4,500,000 (US$579,151) in revenue. The e-commerce store had a peak traffic of 10,000 customers at one time. In April 2021, she employed 10 people to help run her YouTube channel and e-commerce business.

=== Hong Kong Fusion ===
In November 2021, Mira opened the Hong Kong-style restaurant Hong Kong Fusion (Chinese: 香港食堂) in the Lotte Department Store mall in Yeongdeungpo District in Seoul, South Korea. To prepare for the restaurant, she interviewed South Koreans to learn about what they enjoyed eating and what they knew about Hong Kong food. When it opened, about 70% of its customers were Chinese people. After Mira marketed the restaurant towards South Koreans, the customer ratio became 50% South Koreans and 50% Chinese. South Korean customers during the COVID-19 pandemic frequently relied on food delivery platforms, which ranked restaurants to show to customers. To promote the restaurant, Mira asked YouTubers and well-known bloggers, including those from Naver Blog, to eat at and review the restaurant. To keep costs down, the restaurant rents a shared kitchen. In November and December 2021, the restaurant made ₩22.5 million (US$19,669) and ₩50 million (US$43,708) in revenue, respectively, resulting in a profit of ₩6.5 million (US$5,682) and ₩9.5 million (US$8,305), respectively. This was nearly enough to cover her investment costs, which consisted of ₩10 million (US$87,416) to start the restaurant and a refundable ₩10 million (US$87,416) as a security deposit for the shared kitchen. Hong Kong magazine Metro Pop said that the food's taste would differ from what Hong Kong people are used to owing to most of the chefs not being from Hong Kong and the restaurant's aim to cater to South Koreans' tastes. It said that despite this, Hong Kong Fusion "has brought a little comfort and warmth to the Hong Kong international students in South Korea during this difficult period under the COVID-19 pandemic."

== Personal life ==
Mira got married on 27 February 2023, in Canada to Josh. Josh was born in South Korea and immigrated to Canada when he was eight years old. When he attended university in Canada, his parents returned to South Korea. After graduating from university, Josh worked in the United States for a period of time until his visa expired, returned to Canada, where it was hard to find a job, and moved back to South Korea in 2015.
