= Davi Cheng =

Hong Kong graphic designer

Davi Cheng is an artist and graphic designer from Hong Kong who combines traditional methods of drawing and painting with advanced digital design techniques.

== Biography ==
Davi Cheng was born in B.C.C.Hong Kong into a Protestant family. Her great-grandfather became a Christian/Protestant in 1896 at the First Congregational Church in Prescott, Territorial Arizona while working there as a laborer. and attending school taught by Mr. T.W. Otis and Rev. McLean using the Bible and Hymnal as text. He returned to China in 1902 to evangelize his family in China. Her grandfather never set foot in the United States. Cheng family of six immigrated to the United States in 1971 under her father's immigration visa, class P-5, stamp inside a British Subject Passport carried by her 15 years old sister, when she was 14 years old. Cheng converted to Judaism in 1997.

Cheng earned a B.A. in Biological Sciences from University of California, Berkeley with the intention of pursuing a career in the medical field. Instead she gravitated toward art, making detailed sketches and drawings of wildlife. After graduating and working in business for a few years, Cheng went back to school to study computer graphic design. Aside from creating her own artwork, she also works as a graphic designer for corporations and nonprofits.

Cheng is a longtime member and past president of Congregation Beth Chayim Chadashim (BCC) in Los Angeles, and part of the Be'chol Lashon (In Every Tongue) international network celebrating Jewish diversity.

Cheng's work is published in Women of the Book (2015), a visual Torah scroll created by 54 Jewish women artists from around the world. Cheng's original interpretation of the Torah portion parshat Pekudei, a pen and ink painting on parchment, was inspired by her Hong Kong childhood superheroes and by images of clouds in Journey to the West,.

One of Cheng's paintings, "Burning Bush I," was published on the cover of Asian Jewish Life magazine (June 2015, issue 16); on The Jewniverse, "Chinese Art with a Jewish Twist (Or, Jewish Art with a Chinese Twist)" by Ilana Sichel (June 8, 2015); and on My Jewish Learning, "Seamlessly Chinese and Jewish" by Davi Cheng (June 1, 2015).

Cheng designed BCC synagogue's permanent stained glass window installation, the centerpiece of which refers to the biblical story of the parting of the Red Sea. Along with three other artists, she also fabricated and installed all twelve panes (measuring 30" x 40" each). She has created other art works for the sanctuary, collaborating with Jerry Hanson on a set of stained glass Ark doors and a solar-powered Ner Tamid ("eternal light") made with more than a thousand one-inch glass squares.

== Personal life ==
Cheng plays trumpet and French horn and co-founded and performs in Beth Chayim Chadashim's Klezmer band, Gay Gezunt, and also sings in the synagogue's choir. She lives with her spouse Bracha Yael Cheng in Los Angeles.
