= Michelle Sun =

Hong Kong entrepreneur

Michelle Sun 辛婥琳
- Education: University of Chicago (BA)
- Occupation: Entrepreneur
- Website: First Code Academy

Michelle Sun (Chinese: 辛婥琳; pinyin: Xīn Nàolín; born 1986 or 1987 (age 38–39)) is a Chinese entrepreneur from Hong Kong. She founded First Code Academy, a K-12 coding school headquartered in Hong Kong which taught children 4 and up how to code and create mobile applications. The academy had presence in 6 different cities in Asia, including Hong Kong, Singapore, Taipei, Shanghai and Shenzhen. Teaching was given either in their school classrooms or in the firm's own offices.

== Early life and education ==
A native of Hong Kong, Sun completed her secondary school education with nine A's in the Hong Kong Certificate of Education Examination at St Paul's Convent School. She studied Economics at the University of Chicago.

In 2012, she followed a three-month bootcamp course on computer programming at the women-only Hackbright Academy in San Francisco.

In 2016, Sun completed the Master Trainers program at the Massachusetts Institute of Technology, a select program for educators to teach coding to children in K-12 age group.

== Career ==
=== Goldman Sachs ===
From 2007–2010, Sun worked at Goldman Sachs as a financial research analyst in the Telecom, Media and Internet team.

=== Early ventures ===
Sun started her first venture in mobile loyalty space in 2011, which connected merchants and customers on loyalty rewards via a mobile app. Her experience in running this startup inspired her to learn how to code.

=== Silicon Valley startup experience ===
After graduating from Hackbright Academy, Sun worked for various startups in Silicon Valley including Bump Technologies and Buffer where she was the first growth hacker. While in San Francisco, on weekends she started to teach middle school girls as a volunteer, inspiring her to start her own academy.

=== First Code Academy ===
In 2013, Sun moved to Hong Kong and founded First Code Academy in 2013. The venture began on a small scale as a girls-only workshop. It provided a range of courses for both boys and girls from four to eighteen. Starting with a basic introduction to programming, courses included classes on how to build an app, how to build a website and advanced topics including Virtual Reality and Artificial Intelligence. Sun ultimately sought to address the lack of effective coding and programming classes for K-12 students by creating a solution that was able to provide students with skills that would provide them with a toolset that better allows them to approach new situations and stay competitive. She believes that all children need to be coding literate and has a keen interest in increasing the interest of young girls in STEM to encourage diversity in the workplace. After initially launching First Code Academy in 2013 in Hong Kong she moved to expand lessons to locations such as Taiwan, Macau and Singapore. Sun ultimately focused on the importance of showing girls that in spite of currently male-dominated professions they too can succeed in coding, entrepreneurship and STEM as a whole. She believes that encouraging a mindset of growth and the ability to view challenges as an opportunity for growth to be important. Persistence and optimism are equally also qualities that she seeks to impart upon her students. She believes that seeing her students succeed is of the utmost important. Due to the challenging economic environment surrounding Covid-19, First Code Academy discontinued all lessons effective May 31, 2022.

=== Massachusetts Institute of Technology ===
In 2017, Sun assumed a guest lecturer role in the Massachusetts Institute of Technology's Master Trainers program, which provides training to educators who wish to teach coding to children from K-12 age group.

=== Advocacy ===
Sun is active in achieving improvements in gender balance in the tech industry, co-founding the Women Who Code HK chapter and becoming a council member of the Hong Kong Women's Foundation. She believes Women Who Code can contribute to community support for women, providing advice and sharing services. Through the Women's Foundation, she has been inspired by the leadership of Su-Mei Thompson.

== Honors and awards ==
In 2015, Sun was selected by the BBC as one of the "30 Under 30 Women Entrepreneurs" and in 2016 by Forbes' "30 Under 30 in Asia". She was also awarded a Woman of Hope award in 2014 and 2015 in the entrepreneurship category
