= Sias University =

Private university in Xinzheng, China

- 郑州西亚斯学院
- Motto: East meets West, Integrating Knowledge and Practice.
- Type: Private, For-profit
- Established: 1998
- Founder: Shawn Chen
- Affiliations: Fort Hays State University, AUAP, IAUP, IAU, UMAP
- President: Jialin Wang
- Party Secretary: Jiansheng Ma
- Faculty: 1,750
- Undergraduates: 29,600
- Location: Xinzheng, Henan, China; 34.402°N 113.758°E
- Campus: Urban; 362 acres (1.46 km^{2})
- Website: en.sias.edu.cn

Sias University (Sias, Chinese: 郑州西亚斯学院; pinyin: zhèng-zhōu xī-yà-sī xué-yuàn), transliterated Zhengzhou Sias College, and formerly known as Sias International University (郑州大学西亚斯国际学院), is a privately owned, for-profit post-secondary school in Central China. Formerly affiliated with Zhengzhou University, it is now entirely operated by Sias group, a Chinese-based corporation who claims to have incorporated in Los Angeles. It is authorized by the State Council of China to grant both Chinese and American bachelor's degrees, with the latter bearing the name of Fort Hays State University and several other foreign institutions. It is fully accredited by the Chinese Ministry of Education.

Sias is located in Xinzheng, near Henan's capital, Zhengzhou.

== History ==
Sias was founded in 1998 by Chinese-American businessman and venture capitalist Shawn Chen who had the aim of bringing an American liberal arts styled education to China. Sias' enrolment has since grown from 300 to over 30,000.

== About ==
Combining Chinese and Western educational philosophies, the participation of foreign faculty members and the use of English-language teaching materials also enhance bilingual communication skills and encourage all Sias students to explore global strategies to solve problems and develop innovative thinking.

The rate of foreign faculty to students ranks first in China. It offers 35 undergraduate degree programs, 14 associate degree programs, and 6 dual degree programs with Fort Hays State University from Kansas, USA. It also has 5 graduate programs. The fields of study offering degrees include liberal arts, science, engineering, economics, management, medicine, law, education, and the performing arts.

== American/Chinese fusion ==
Sias University has an east–west focus, as seen in its architecture, funding, and ownership. The Sias campus was designed by Peter Weiss, an associate professor at Auburn University and his partner Charles Martin. They have designed over 80 buildings and are the only Americans to design a college campus in China. The administration building is designed to look like the U.S. capitol building on one side (facing the campus) and traditional Chinese design on the other side (facing the city of Xinzheng).

== Foreign faculty ==
The school employs over 1,750 full-time faculty. As of 2016, there are 138 foreign faculty from 10 countries teaching at Sias. The majority of the foreign faculty are Americans, although Canadian, Filipino, German, Russian, Korean, Japanese, Indian, Australian, and Latin American educators are also represented. Sias' foreign faculty also are involved outside of the classroom by planning the International Culture Week, culture trips, holiday parties, and bake sales for charity.

== Academics ==
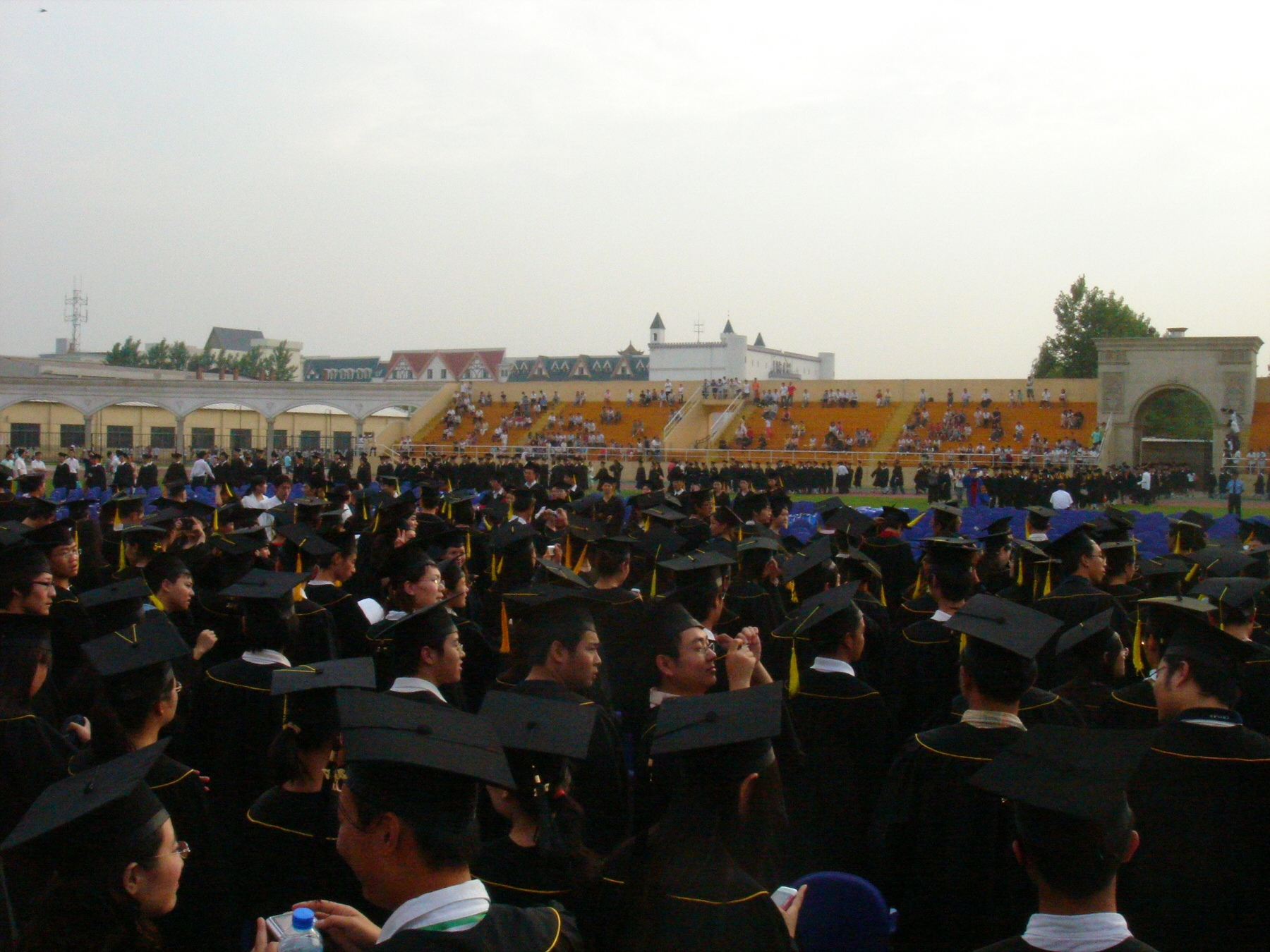
Graduation at Sias International University

The nine discipline areas offering degrees include liberal arts, science, engineering, economics, management, medicine, law, education and the performing arts.

Sias is one of the first schools in China to offer students American bachelor's degrees in partnership with Fort Hays State University in Hays, Kansas. Students take credit hours of American college courses all taught in English, and they are able to transfer the remaining credit hours from their 200 hours of carefully articulated Chinese courses to earn degrees. About 10% of all Sias students study under the partnership of Fort Hays, theoretically allowing Chinese students to earn an American degree without setting foot in the United States.

== International students ==
Sias offers international (non-Chinese) students the option of earning the American degree, in which the international student attends all-English, or English-Chinese, classes. The bulk of the international student body consist of aspiring Chinese as a second language speakers either enriching their lives, or preparing for the HSK Chinese Proficiency Test.

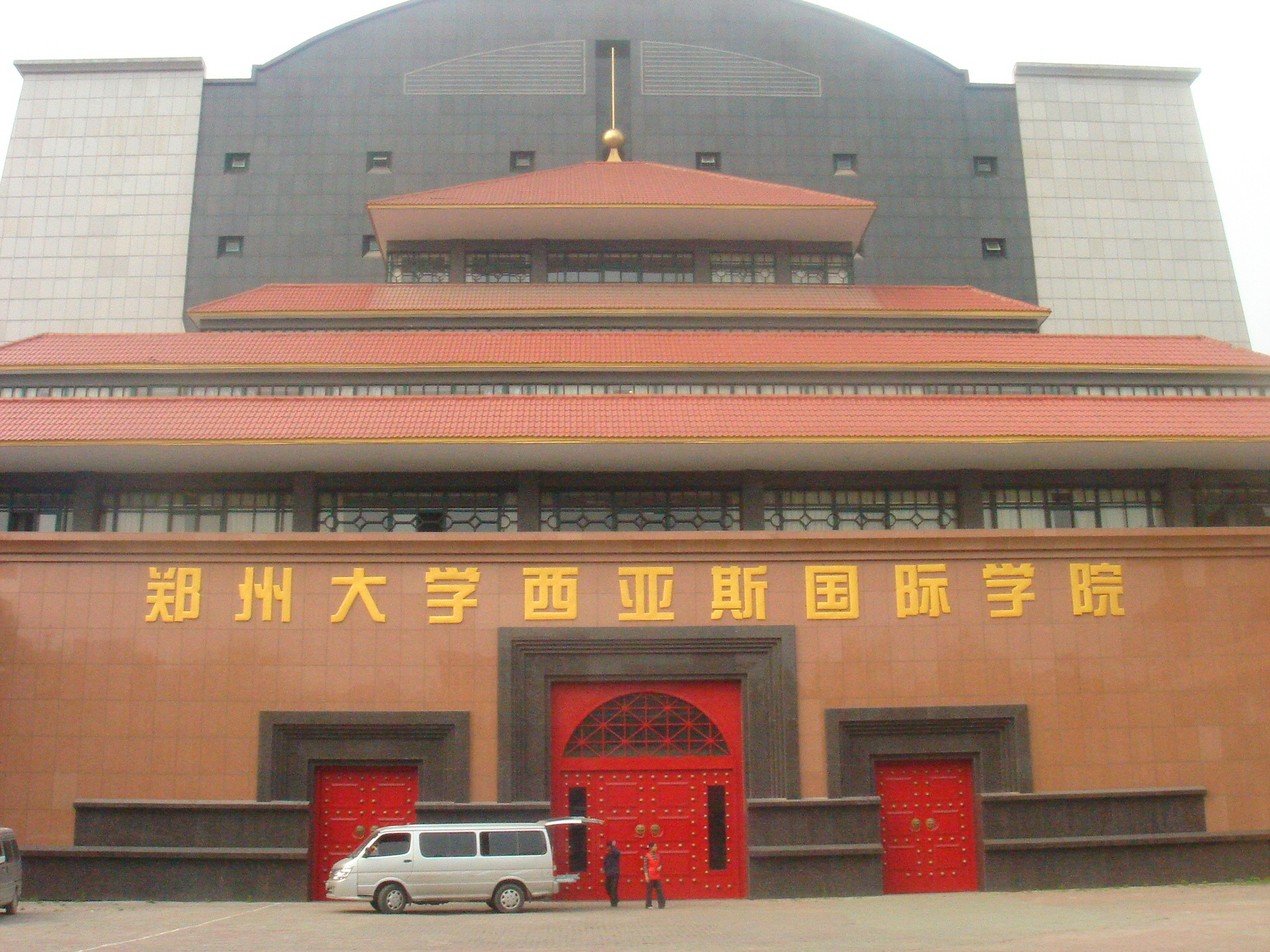
Administration Building seen from People's Road

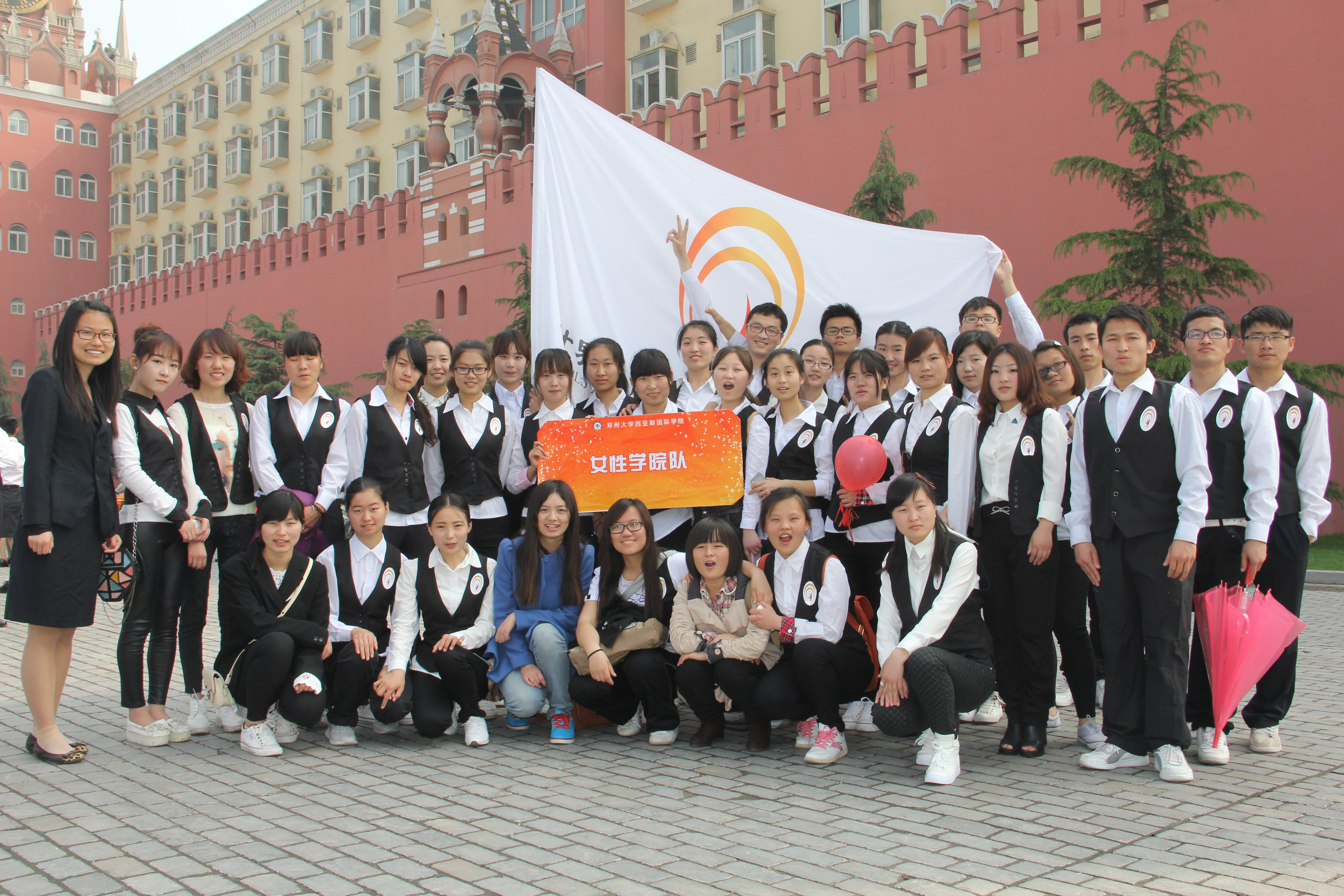
Sias Student members of World Academy for the Future of Women

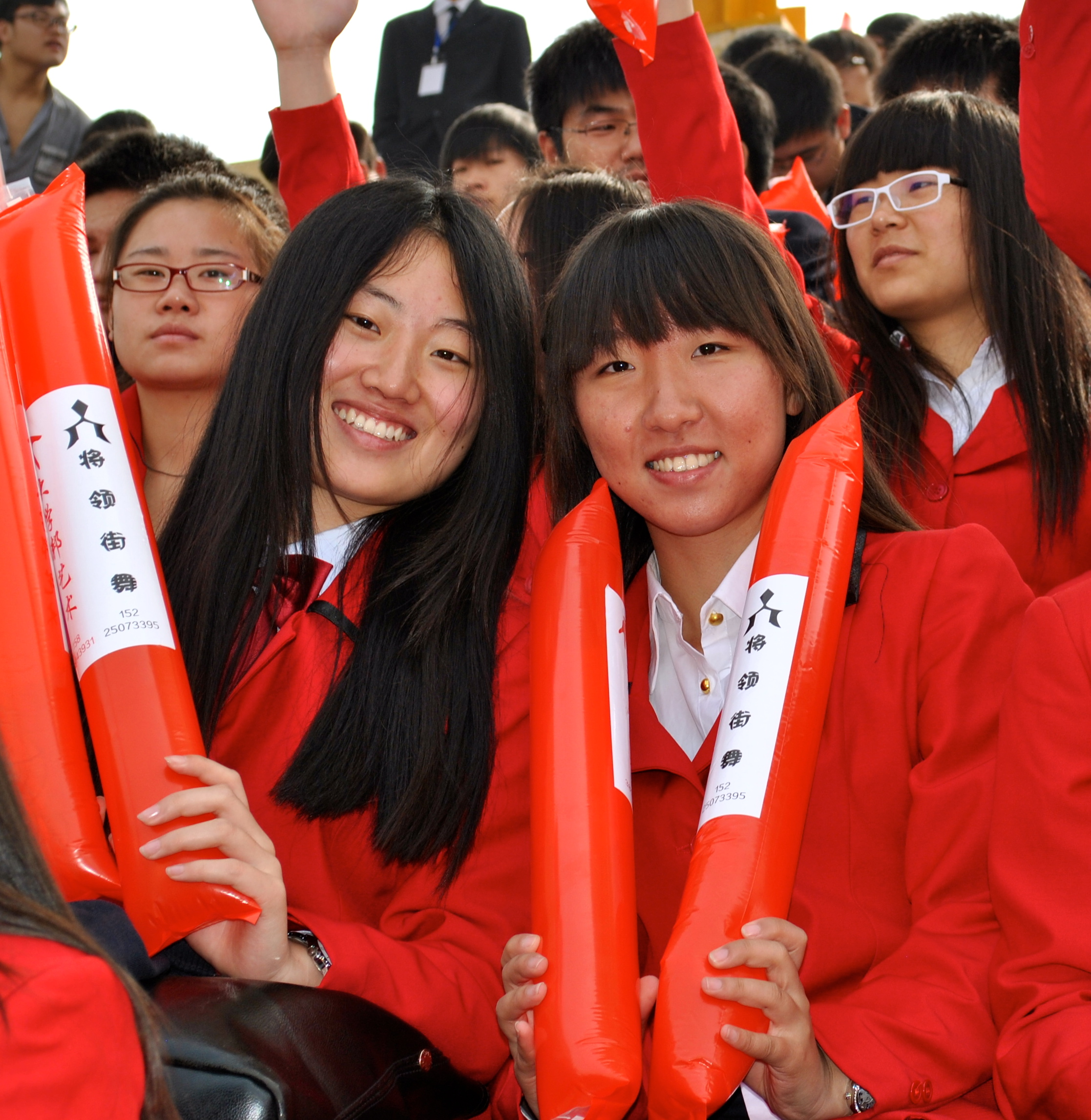
Sias students at Spring Sports Festivity

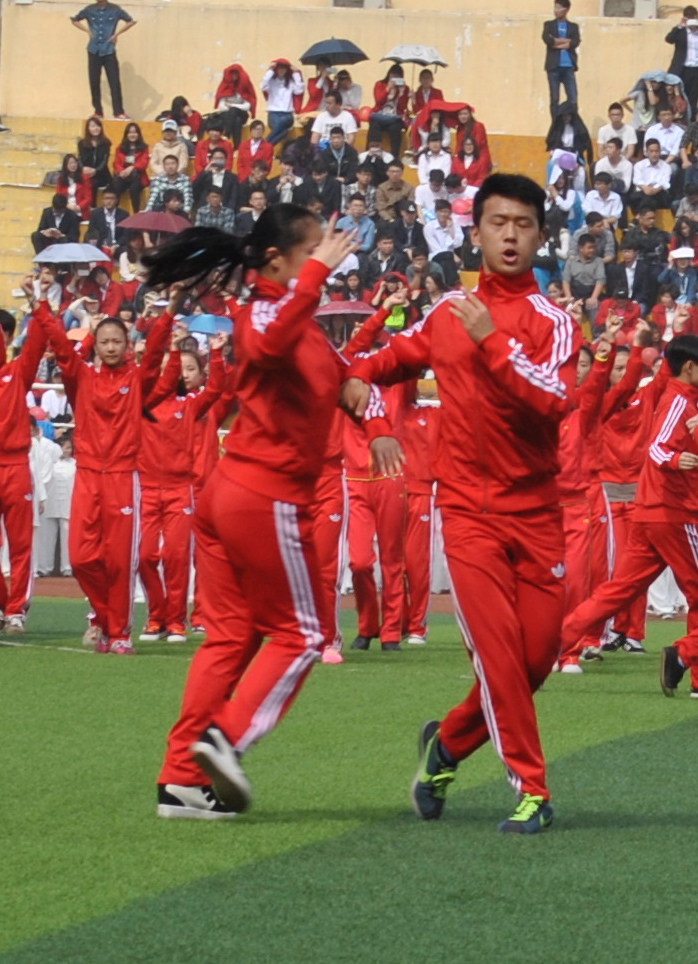
Sias students at Dancing Routine

== Campus environment ==
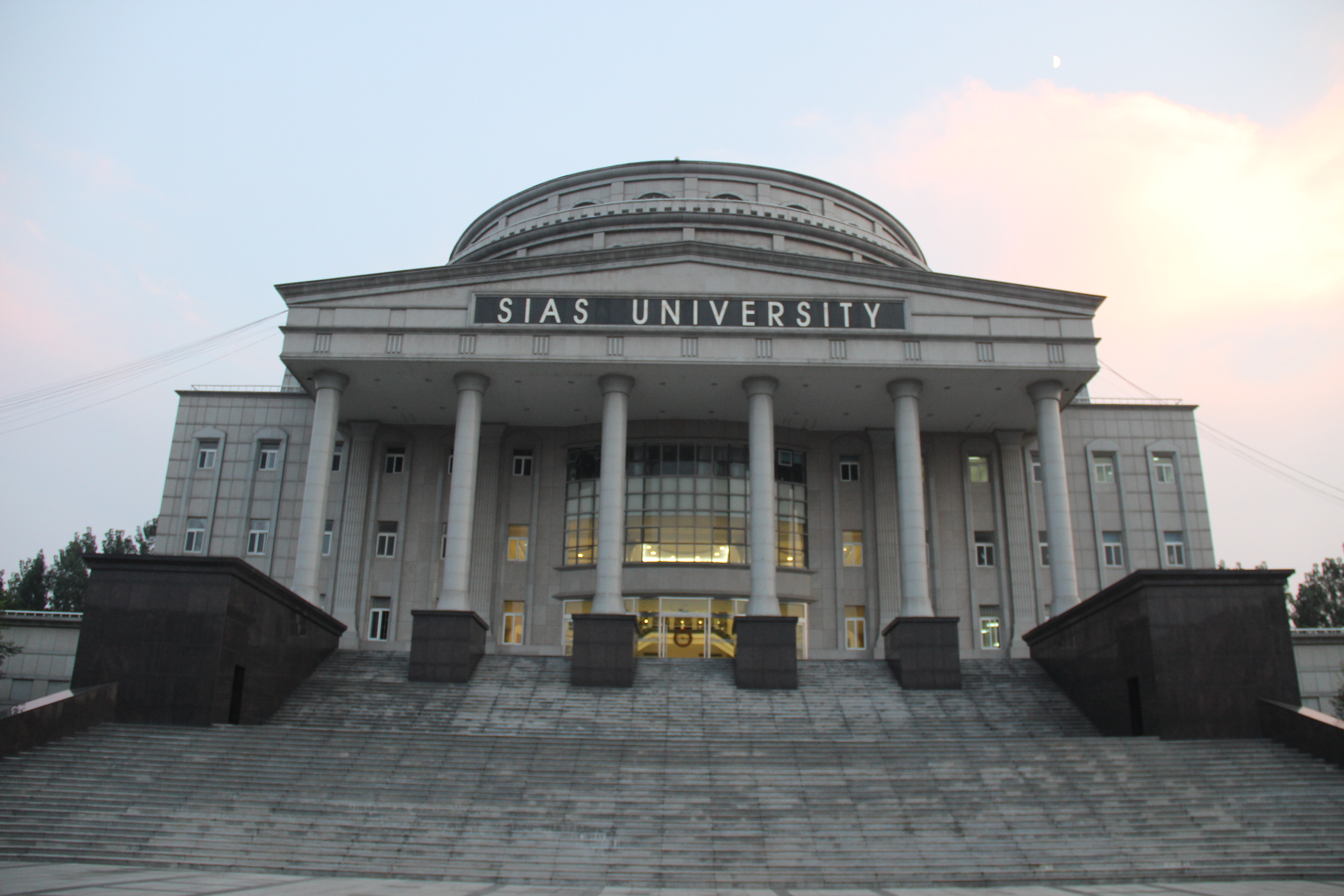
Sias International University

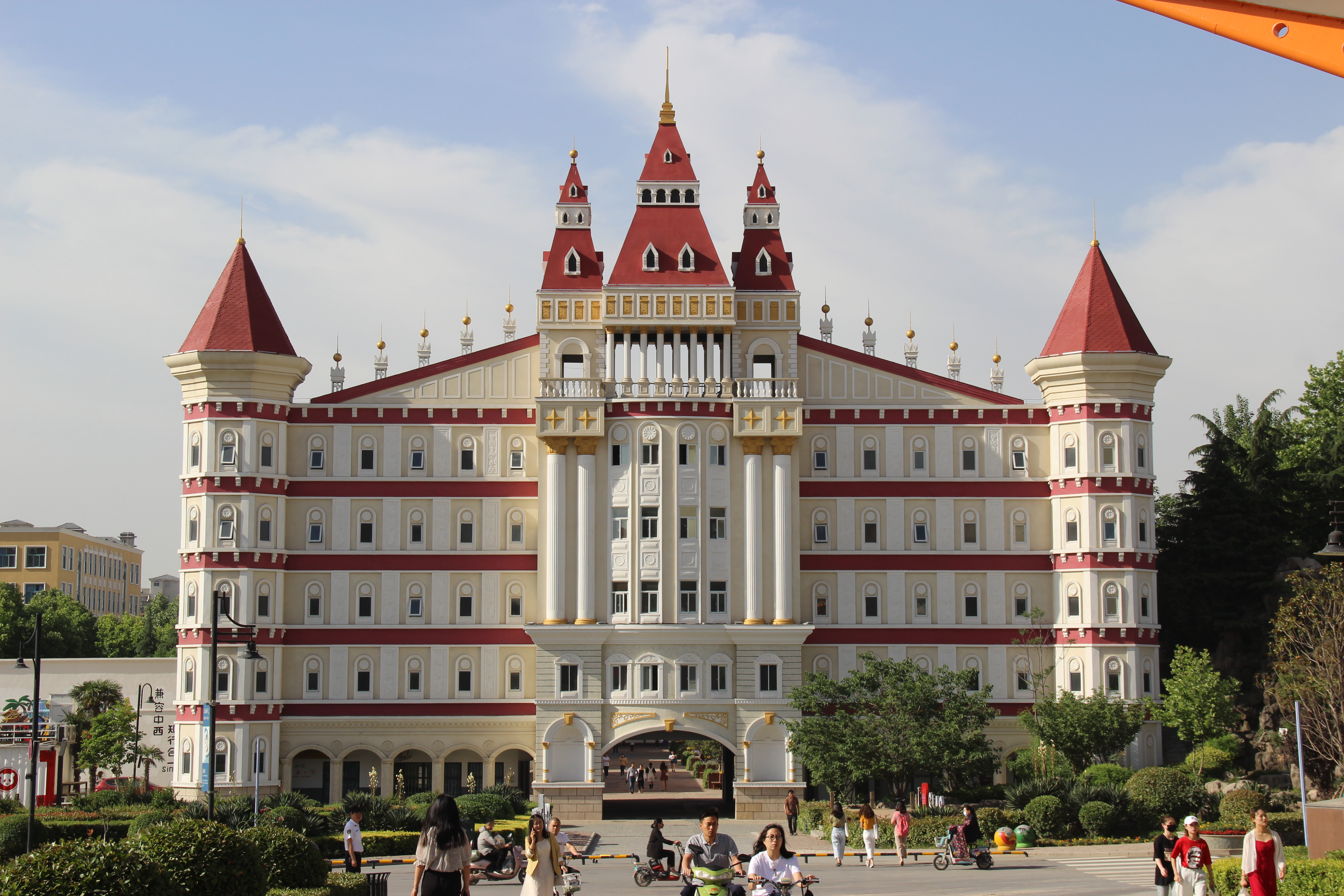
Sias University 2019 Entrance to German Street

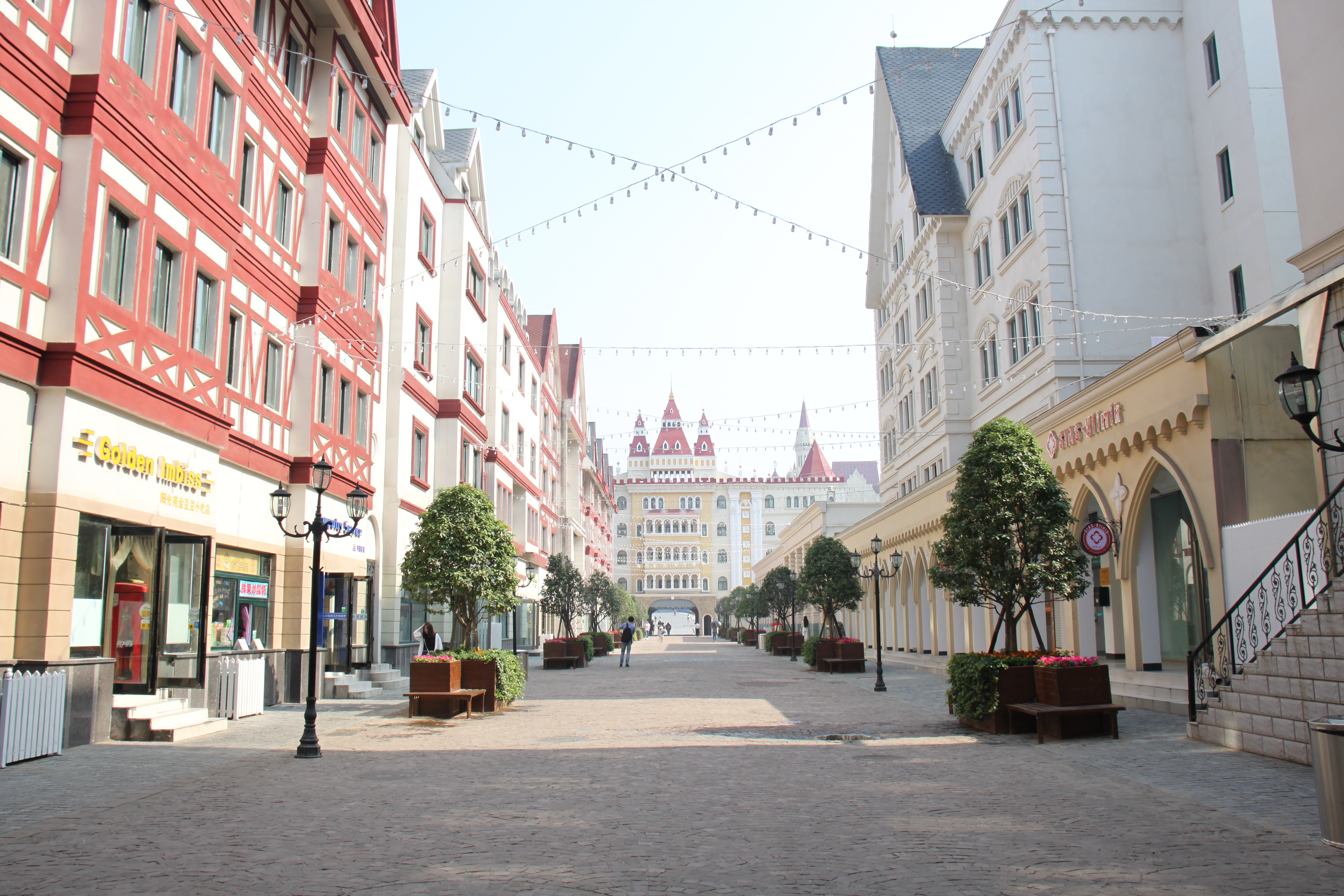
Sias University European Street

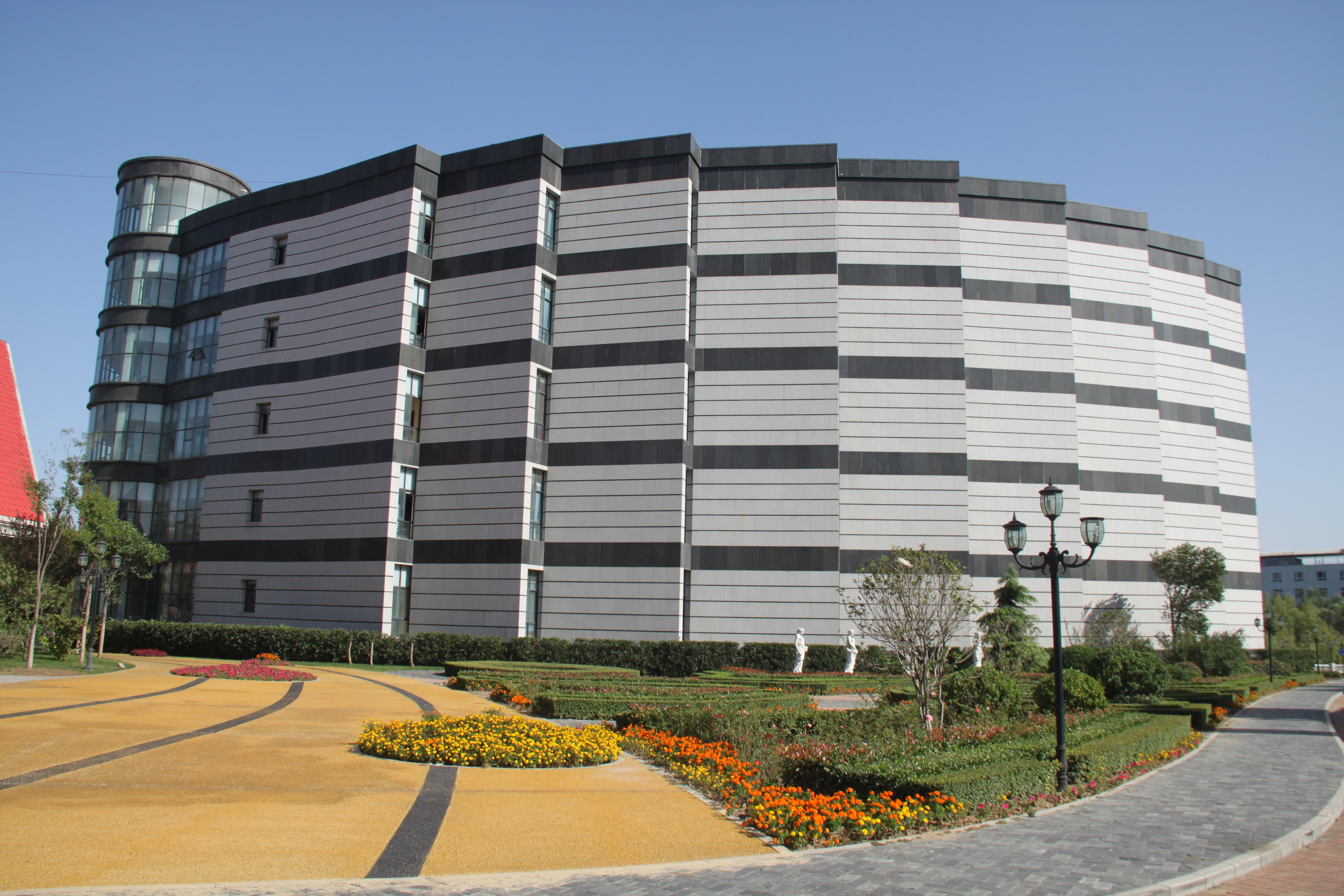
Sias University 2015- Classroom Building 14 & Performing Arts Center

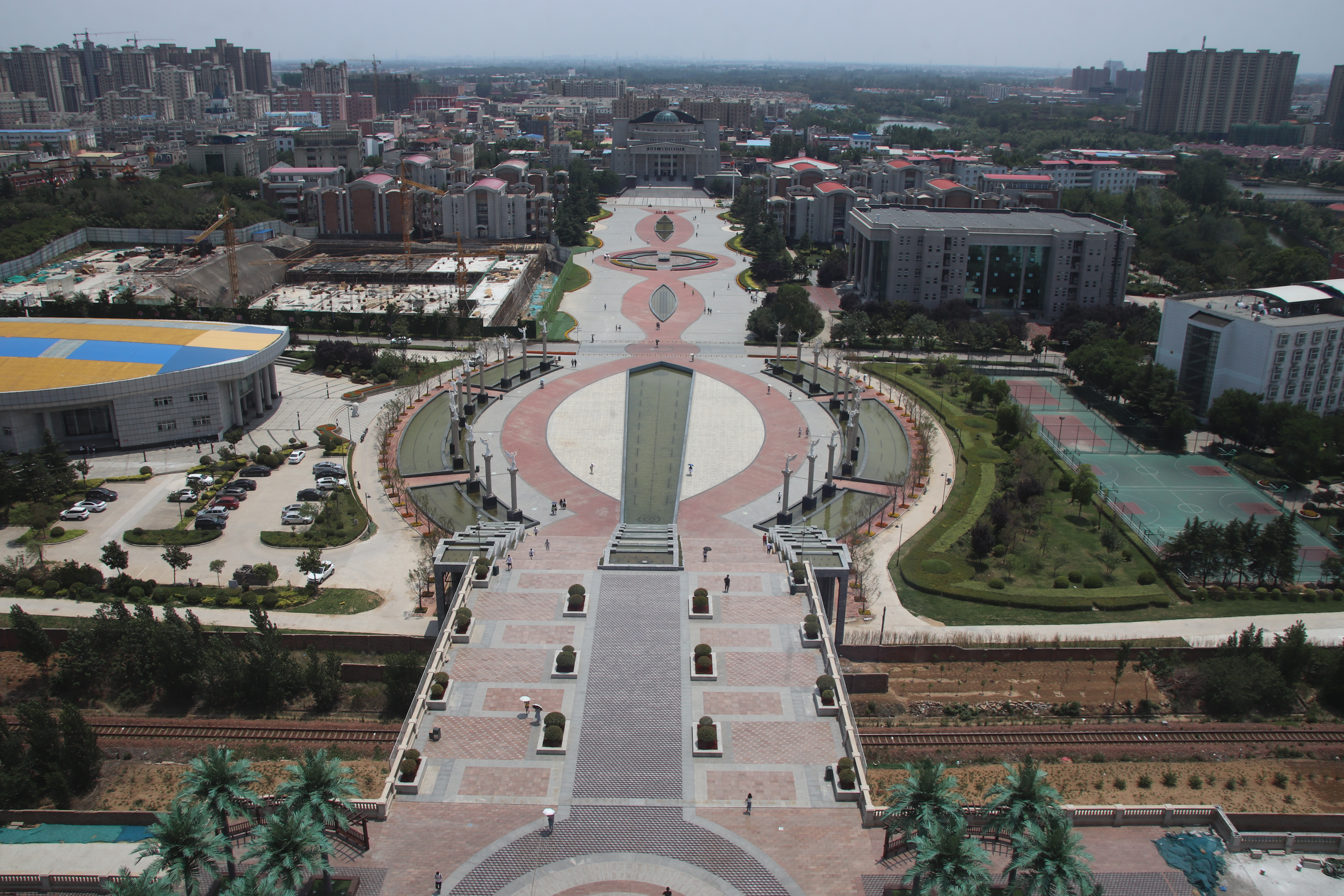
View from Top of Sias University Library Looking South

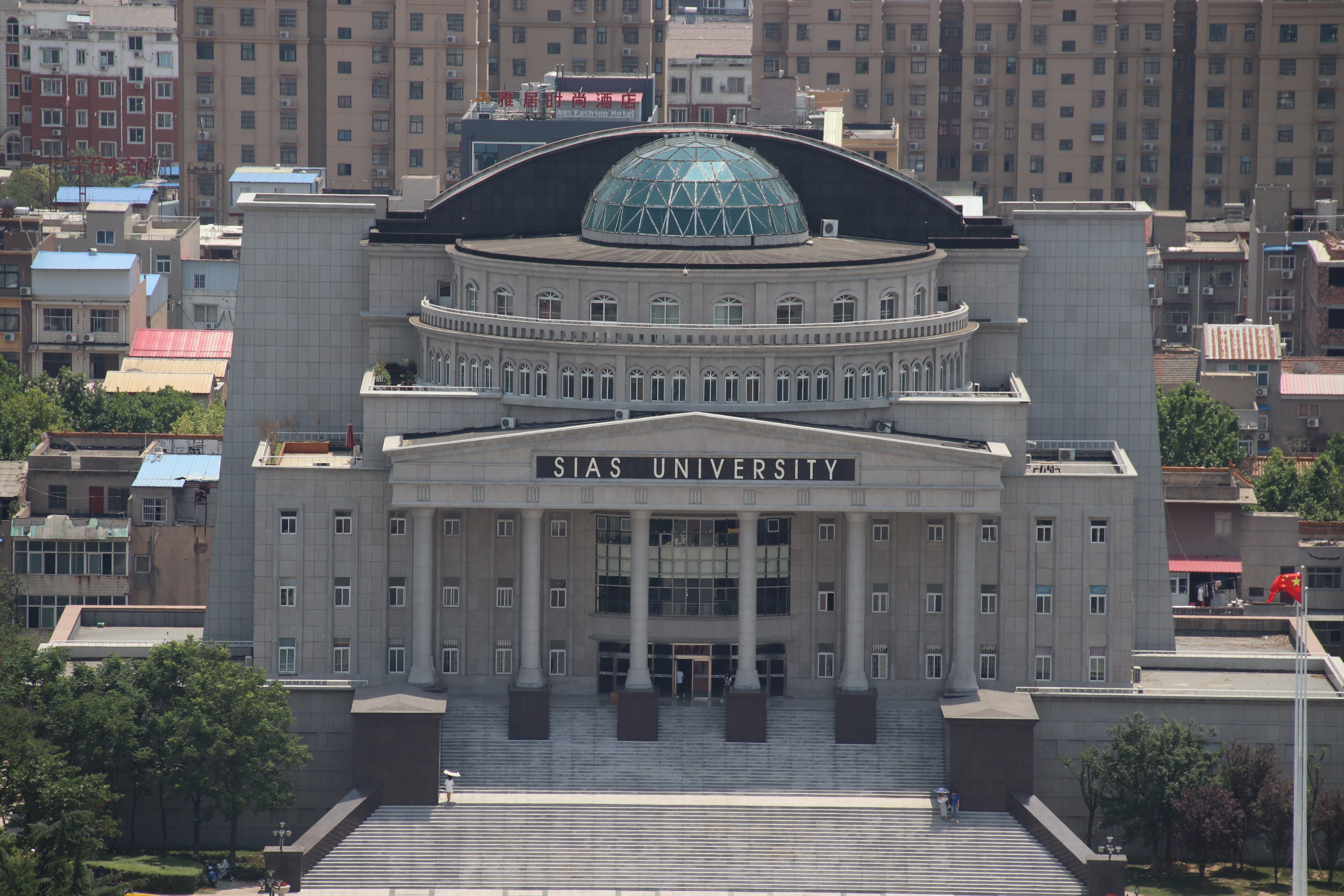
View from Top of Sias University Library Looking South at Administration Building

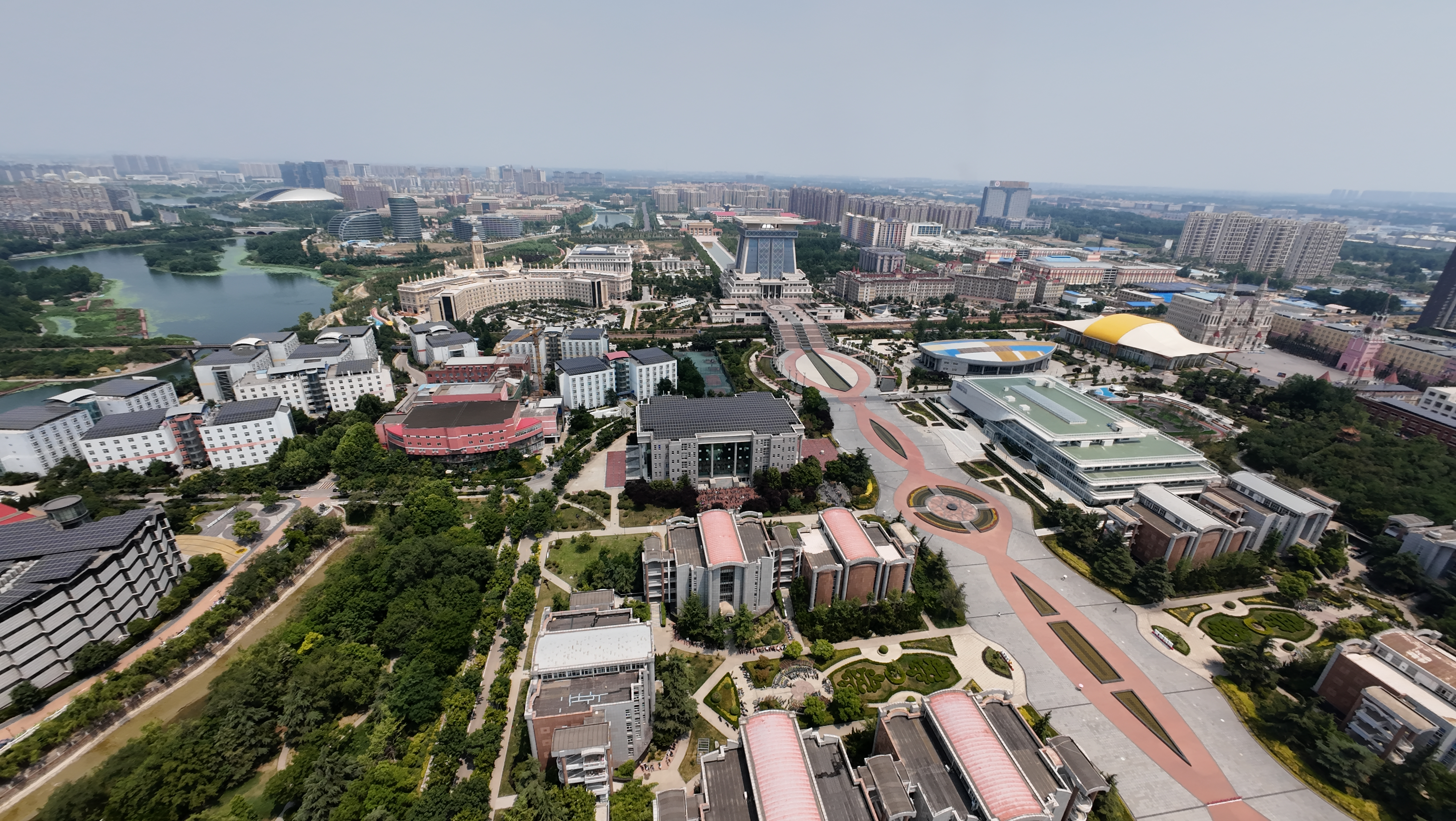
Sias University Campus, Drone

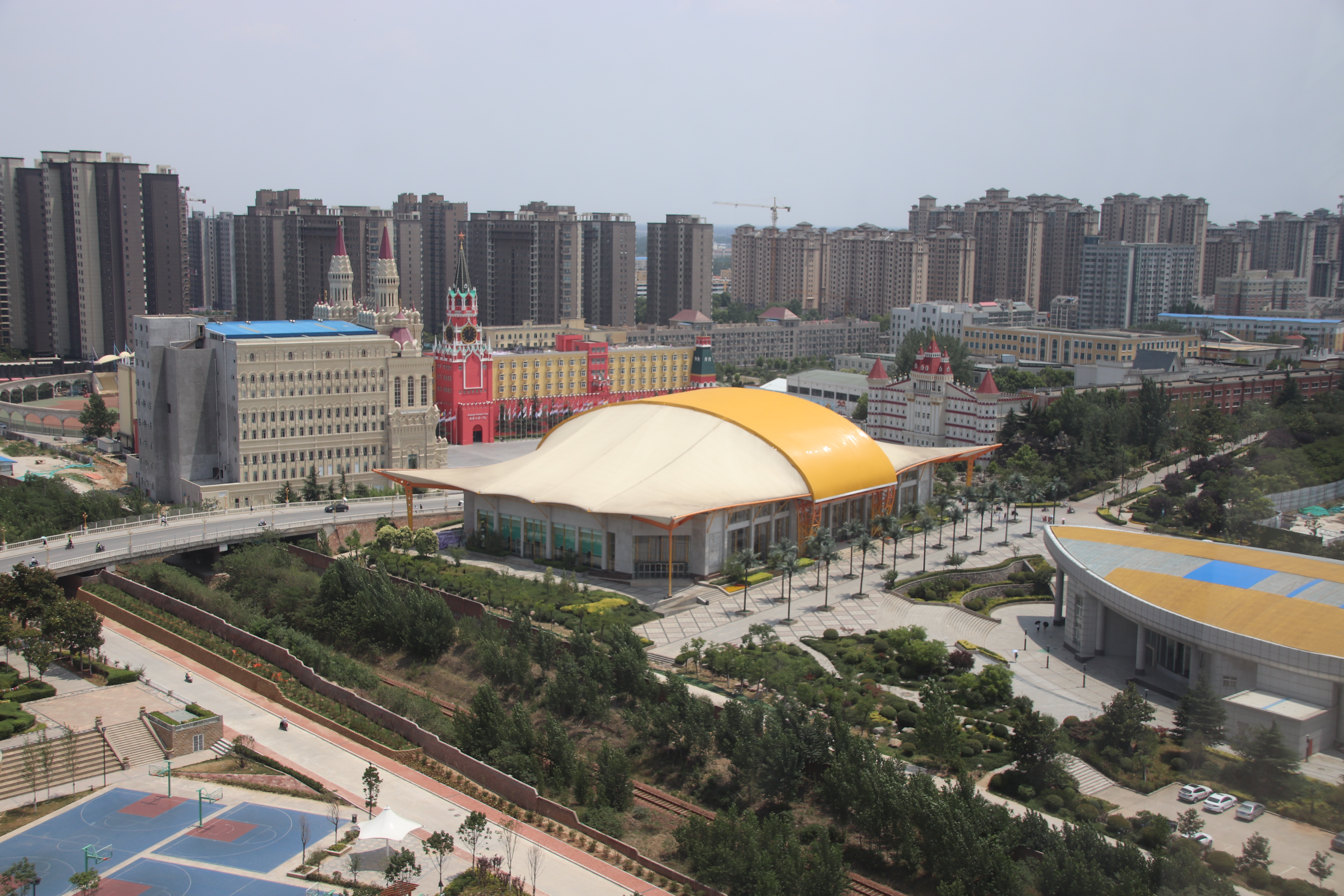
View from Top of Sias University Library Looking Southeast at Gym & Russian Square 2019
