= Bob's Your Uncle (YouTuber) =

Hong Kong YouTuber who makes videos about cooking and travelling

- 煮家男人
- Bob's Your Uncle logo
- Born: 18 June 1981 (age 44)

YouTube information
- Channel: 煮家男人 Bob's Your Uncle
- Years active: 2014–present
- Genre: Cooking
- Subscribers: 711 thousand
- Views: 107 million
- Last updated: 25 April 2026

Bob's Your Uncle
- Chinese: 煮家男人
Transcriptions
Standard Mandarin
- Hanyu Pinyin: Zhǔ Jiā Nán Rén
Yue: Cantonese
- Jyutping: Zyu^{2} Gaa^{1} Naam^{4} Jan^{4*2}

Bob's Your Uncle (Chinese: 煮家男人) (born 18 June 1981), known as Uncle Bob (Chinese: Bob叔), is a Hong Kong YouTuber who makes videos about cooking and travelling. As a teenage student, he travelled to the United Kingdom for schooling. Uncle Bob started to learn to cook after he found the Chinese restaurants he visited to be unappetising.

Uncle Bob started a YouTube channel in 2014 at the suggestion of his wife, who worked in advertising. He makes cooking videos about dishes from numerous countries. Uncle Bob uses Cantonese slang and Cantonese profanity in his videos. In addition to sharing about his personal life experiences, he discusses current events and political issues. Bob's Your Uncle was included in the "yellow YouTube circle" list in which netizens promoted channels that supported the 2019–20 Hong Kong protests. His travel videos include reviews of cruise ships and first-class flights. After moving to the United Kingdom, he made a video sharing his experience of finding a rental in London.

== Early and personal life ==
Uncle Bob was born on 18 June 1981. He began cooking when he was 15 or 16 years old after having moved by himself to the United Kingdom as an international student. Uncle Bob had little money at the time. When he ate at Chinese restaurants, he found the food to be unappetising: the fried rice was too dry and the meat was tasteless. He lamented that the food sometimes was not even sufficiently warm. His first dish was luncheon meat and fried egg and was made for his then-girlfriend. He did not know how to cook at the time and added ginger to the dish. As he began teaching himself to cook, he made fried shrimp with scrambled eggs and sweet and sour pork. Uncle Bob only started enjoying cooking after he returned to Hong Kong. As his wife enjoyed eating, he spent time delving into how to make dishes from different countries. His cooking knowledge is sourced from the Internet. He receives his cooking inspiration from eating at restaurants and learning from how the chefs make the dishes. He is married to fellow Hongkonger Ms. Fung (Chinese: 馮小姐). Uncle Bob met her for the first time around 2007 at Devon House, and they have been married since 25 May 2014. Both Uncle Bob and his wife have worked in advertising. Uncle Bob is a strong association football fan who has travelled to numerous international stadiums to watch his favourite team.

Uncle Bob, who had studied and lived in the United Kingdom for numerous years, moved to the United Kingdom. He made a video about his experiences renting a place in London. Netizens suggested that he review the Clapham Place, a new development. Uncle Bob published a video criticising the building for being overpriced, having terrible amenities, and being next to a busy street. A lawyer for developer Regal London sent him a letter demanding he remove the video.

== YouTube channel ==
=== Cooking ===
Uncle Bob's wife, who worked in advertising, suggested that he post videos of his cooking online since he was frequently cooking. Uncle Bob, who had prior experience with film editing, followed her suggestion. He started his YouTube channel on 26 January 2014. Six months after creating the channel, Uncle Bob had uploaded more than 60 videos, each of which was receiving tens of thousands of views. The dishes in his cooking videos are from different countries' cuisines and are primarily higher-end. The dishes he made included oxtail soaked in black beer, okonomiyaki, beer-soaked chicken, rabbit stew made from cider, squirrel fish, katsudon, banana cake, and minced beef claypot rice. Uncle Bob frequently watched cooking videos from Marco Pierre White and Bruno Albouze and admired their cooking skills and how they were able to simplify complicated steps in a recipe. He travelled to various countries to teach viewers how to make local dishes such as schweinshaxe from Germany, tandoori chicken from India, and börek from Turkey.

Uncle Bob converses with Hong Kong slang and Cantonese profanity, which he uses during everyday speech. To make a cooking video, it usually takes him one night for filming, one night for editing, and two to three days to add English and Chinese subtitles. He has no trouble with coming up with English subtitles but finds Chinese subtitles to be cumbersome owing to his slow Chinese input method. U Lifestyle said Uncle Bob was "very popular on the Internet" because his "shooting method is unique".

According to a 2020 article, Uncle Bob had not published any cooking videos recently. In 2021, Bob's Your Uncle had over 600,000 subscribers.

=== Travelling ===
Uncle Bob has created travel videos about his trips on cruise ships and first-class flights. He made a video reviewing a first-class Singapore Airlines flight from Singapore to Hong Kong he and his wife took on an Airbus A380 in May 2019. Before embarking on the flight, Uncle Bob visited Changi Airport's SilverKris Lounge, which he did a review of.

Uncle Bob took a Virgin Atlantic flight from Hong Kong to London on 14 December 2020 which he reviewed on his YouTube channel. On 18 January, he published a YouTube video describing how there were two plainclothes people at the boarding gate who were not carrying luggage and were monitoring the passengers. Uncle Bob purposefully boarded the plane just before it was about to take off to see whether the plainclothes people would board the flight. After not seeing them board, he said he felt as if he had been at Pyongyang International Airport in North Korea. Stand News later confirmed that the officials were Immigration Department investigators who were monitoring for "suspicious persons" trying to leave Hong Kong with fake identity documents.

=== Politics and other topics ===
While preparing the food for his cooking videos, Uncle Bob shared his views about current events and what is happening in his life. Metropop's Onyx found that Uncle Bob's sharing of his personal life gave viewers a "near and dear feeling". He points out the ills of the present day and pinpoints the core of each issue. Uncle Bob discussed the Hong Kong 1 July marches, dating, and going shopping with a woman. While making a video about cooking lasagna, he said that it was unbelievable when the police claimed only 98,000 people had attended the 1 July marches. He answered questions from viewers about job hunting, long-distance relationships, honeymoons, and the Occupy Central protests. Uncle Bob did a collaboration video titled "Strike It Rich" (Chinese: 發財好市) with another Hong Kong YouTuber, Mama Cheung, after he liked the fried oyster omelettes she had made.

In 2019, Uncle Bob made a video criticising two key opinion leaders who had said there was no point to going to school. He argued that there were numerous benefits to school. When mainland Chinese viewers suggested that he post his videos on Youku for the convenience of mainland Chinese viewers, Uncle Bob stated that the mainland Chinese government did not tolerate dissenting opinions. He joked that when he talked about Leung Kwok-hung, a member of the Legislative Council of Hong Kong, filibustering, mainland Chinese websites would insert a Wuliangye Yibin commercial. Uncle Bob then immediately inserted a Wuliangye Yibin ad.

Bob's Your Uncle was included in the "yellow YouTube circle" in which netizens backed channels that were in favour of the 2019–20 Hong Kong protests. Uncle Bob said that as a businessman, he supported the yellow economic circle and joined a 12 January 2020 rally in favour of it. He said that owing to the 2019 Yuen Long attack, numerous people in the Hong Kong middle-class "turned yellow", and this is "all because of the government, Black Police, and police violence". He forcefully denounced the Hong Kong Police Force for making numerous arrests he considered indiscriminate including of weak old women.

== Reception ==
Jenny Leung wrote in Timeout that Bob's Your Uncle is "by far the most popular cooking channel in Hong Kong" and said that he is "known for his easy to execute recipes, relatable commentary, and satirical sense of humour". China Press's Ng Sin Lim said that Uncle Bob distinguished himself from other YouTubers that made cooking tutorial videos through his "natural and genuine temperament" as well as his "simple background music and beautiful video clips". Wu said Uncle Bob "captured people's hearts" through a combination of his British humour and Hong Kong-style mockery. Lee Pat Fong of Apple Daily praised Uncle Bob's channel for "teaching cooking in a very special way" and lauded his filming and film editing for being "professional".

Metropop's Onyx reviewed two of Uncle Bob's videos and concluded they simply explained how to cook the food through easy to understand presentation. Onyx said that Uncle Bob shared numerous cooking tips and "even a beginner cook could easily learn from his videos". HK01 journalist Dang Wing Kei wrote that Bob's Your Uncle was his favourite culinary YouTube channel since as Uncle Bob cooks, he talks about numerous varied topics. Apple Daily said that although Uncle Bob looks like an overweight Jimmy Lai, "he has exemplary culinary skills, is proficient in multinational cuisines, and has a generous voice that talks casually about what is on his mind".
