= Chinese slang =

Chinese slang may refer to:

- Mandarin Chinese profanity
- Cantonese profanity
- Diu (Cantonese)
- Chinese Internet slang
