= Hong Kong slang =

Slang in Hong Kong evolves over time, and mainly comprises Cantonese, English, or a combination of the two.

== Introduction ==
The word slanguage consists of two original English words, slang and language. 'Slang' means informal usage in vocabulary and idioms that is characteristically more metaphorical, while 'Language' means a body of words in which people who are of the same culture, community or nation share the system.

Hong Kong slanguage consists of commonly used terms or trendy expressions in Hong Kong which are in Cantonese only. This type of language is used both in written and spoken words. As Hong Kong slanguage mainly consists of trendy expressions that are commonly used in the Internet and other social medias, it broadly represents the culture or social issues which take place in a certain period of time. Therefore, Hong Kong slanguage usually changes with time and some words would be eliminated over time. Due to usage of non-standard words or phrases, Hong Kong slanguage is still relatively less accepted and understood by Cantonese speakers.

== History ==
The rise of local slanguage is a social phenomenon in Hong Kong. In Hong Kong, there are approximately 5.4 million active internet users. This immense number of Internet users apparently gives an impetus to the evolution of Hong Kong online forums and the birth of Hong Kong slanguage.

The trend started with the development of local online forums. The two dominating online forums in Hong Kong, HK Golden Forum and HK Discuss Forum, were found in 2000 and 2003 respectively. As the number of Hong Kong forum users gradually increased, members of younger generation found typing formal Chinese words and sentences on the Internet to be old-fashioned, developing distinct and innovative online buzzwords.

In the beginning, those words were exclusively used on online forums and amongst younger Internet users. Unexpectedly, some new phrases spread extensively, becoming commonplace, not only amongst Hong Kong teenagers, but also enjoying use widespread use among Hong Kong adults and in the media. Some of these new terms are now widely accepted by the public and are classified as 'Hong Kong slanguage'.

In 2008, Hong Kong Certificate of Education Examination, local slanguage was included in the questions by the Hong Kong Examinations and Assessment Authority in Chinese paper five. In 2009, a form-three student was found using slang terms in the Territory-wide System Assessment. Hong Kong slanguage has had a broad impact in the lives of Hong Kong people, far outreaching its internet origins.

== Examples ==
There are several examples of the usage of slanguage. Terms below use Jyutping for Cantonese romanization.

=== Appellation ===
1. Aa3 caa1 (阿差) - South Asian especially, Indian and Pakistanis.

- In British Hong Kong era, there were many British Indian serving for police officers (in Cantonese, 差人) in Hong Kong.

2. Ban1 zai2 (賓仔), Ban1 mui6 (賓妹) - Filipino boys and Filipino girls respectively, especially refer to Filipino domestic employees.

- Chinese name of Philippines is 菲律賓.

3. Caai1 lou2 (差佬), Caa1 po4 (差婆) - Policemen and Policewomen respectively.

4. Daai6 ji5 lung1 (大耳窿) - Literally means Big ear hole; Loanshark.

- 窿 means "Hole" in Cantonese, also sounds like English word Loan.

5. Faa1 saang1 jau5 (花生友) - Literally means "Peanut guy"; Bystanders / Onlookers.

- Sik6 faa1 saang1 (食花生) - Literally to eat Peanut; To grab the popcorn / To grab a front seat.

6. Gaa2 zai2 (㗎仔), Gaa2 mui6 (㗎妹) - Japanese boys and Japanese girls respectively.

7. Gam1 so2 si4 (金鎖匙) - Literally means "Golden key"; Silver spoon (People who are born in rich families).

8. Gwai2 lou2 (鬼佬), Gwai2 po4 (鬼婆), Gwai2 zai2 (鬼仔), Gwai2 mui6 (鬼妹) - referred to Gweilo; Caucasian men, Caucasian women, Caucasian boys and Caucasian girls respectively.

9. Ji6 ng5 zai2 (二五仔) - Literally means "Two" "Five" Son; Insurgent, rebel, traitor or snitch. This comes from Triad argot.

10. Lou5 si2 fat1 (老屎忽) - Literally means old buttocks (Alternatively, Old seafood - seafood sounds like Cantonese word "屎忽"); Old fart.

11. Maa1 daa2 (媽打), Faa1 daa2 (花打), Baa1 daa2 (巴打) and Si1 daa2 (絲打) - Sound like the English words "Mother", "Father", "Brother" and "Sister" respectively; Mother, Father, Brother and Sister respectively.

12. Puk1 gaai1 (仆街) - Sound like the English words "Poor Guy"; Villain / Bastard or someone deserves to die.

13. Sai3 man1 zai2 (細蚊仔) - Literally means small mosquito; Children / Kids.

14. Se4 wong4 (蛇王) - Literally means Snake King; Could either describe someone who is a professional salary stealer or a professional snake catcher.

15. Seoi2 jyu4 (水魚) - Literally means Water fish; 1). - Turtle or Trionychidae. 2.) - Easy mark (Someone who is easily deceived, fooled or victimised).

16. Si1 naai5 (師奶) (Alternatively, C nine) - Sound like the English words "C" "Nine"; Aunt, housewife or married woman.

17. Sik6 sak1 mai5 (食塞米) - Freeloader / Sponger.

18. Sik6 ziu1 (食蕉) - Literally to eat banana and sounds like the English word "Secure"; 1.)Security guard. 2.) Eat excrement, as bananas look like excrement.

19. So-di-a-sm - Sounds like the Cantonese words "掃地啊嬸" - A woman served for cleaning helper, janitor or custodian.

=== Business ===
==== Company ====
1. Cat1 zai2 (七仔) - Literally means "Seven" son; 7-Eleven.

2. Daai6 zau2 dim3 (大酒店) - Literally means Big hotel; 1.) - Hongkong and Shanghai Hotels. 2.) - Funeral home.

3. Gai1 gei3 (雞記) - Etymology: 雞 (Chicken) + 記 ("meaningless suffix"); KFC restaurant.

4. Lou5 din6 (老電) - Etymology: 老 ("old", "elder" or "ancient") + 電 (Literally means "Electricity" or "Tele-"; PCCW.

5. M gei3 (M記) (Alternatively, Mak6 gei3 (麥記, Etymology: 麥 (Sounds like Scottish prefix "Mc") + 記 ("meaningless suffix")) or Lou5 mak6 (老麥, Etymology: 老 ("meaningless prefix") + 麥 (Sounds like Scottish prefix "Mc")) - McDonald's.

==== Business terminology ====
1. Caau2 jau4 jyu4 (炒魷魚) - Literally to stir-fry a squid; Dismissal.

2. Daai6 ceot1 hyut3 (大出血) - Literally means Heavy Bleeding; To cost an arm and a leg / pay a small fortune.

3. Daat3 deng6 (撻訂) - The seller forfeits buyer's deposit after the buyer failed to complete the deal.

4. Dan6 dung1 gu1 (燉冬菇) - Literally to simmer Shiitake Mushrooms; Demotion, this slang originated from Hong Kong Police Force in British Hong Kong era.

5. Fei4 gai1 caan1 (肥雞餐) - Literally means Fat Chicken Meal; A generous voluntary severance package or Golden handshake.

6. Haai5 fo3 (蟹貨) - Literally means Crab-Goods; Stocks or goods that have decreased in value, such that selling it will result in loss.

7. Paak3 wu1 jing1 (拍烏蠅) - Literally to swat flies; having a slack business.

8. Se3 bok3 (卸膊) (Alternatively, Se3 bo1 (卸波)) - Literally to unload shoulder (to unload ball); to bunk off or to deny or refuse responsibility.

9. Se4 wong4 (蛇王) - Literally means Snake King; Absent Without Leave, skive off / slack off, sneak out or The act of being lazy or unwilling to do something at work.

10. Sik6 mou4 cing4 gai1 (食無情雞) - Literally to eat merciless chicken; To receive a Pink slip.

11. Zap1 lap1 (執笠) - To close down / To go bankrupt.

==== Unit of Money ====
1. Hou4 zi2 (毫子) - 10 Cents.

2. Man1 (蚊) - Literally means Mosquito; Dollar.

- Jat1 man1 (一蚊) = One dollar.

3. Cou2 (草) - Literally means Grass; 10 Dollars.

- Jat1 cou2 je5 (一草嘢) = Ten dollars.

4. Gau6 (嚿) - Literally means Piece; 100 Dollars.

- Jat1 gau6 seoi2 (一嚿水) = One hundred dollars.

5. Pei4 (皮), Lap1 (粒) or Pun4 (盤) - Literally means Skin, Granular, Basin or sink-shaped respectively; 10,000 Dollars.

- Jat1 pei4 je5 (一皮嘢) = Jat1 lap1 je5 (一粒嘢) = Jat1 pun4 seoi2 (一盤水) = Ten thousands dollars.

6. Kau4 (球) - Literally means Ball; 1,000,000 Dollars.

- Jat1 kau4 (一球) = One million dollars.

7. Cing1 haai5 (青蟹) - Literally means Green crab; Hong Kong ten-dollar note (issued in 1982-85 by HSBC).

8. Faa1 haai5 (花蟹) - Literally means Flower crab; Hong Kong ten-dollar note (issued in 2002-2005 by Hong Kong government).

9. Gaau1 haai5 (膠蟹) - Literally means Plastic crab; Hong Kong ten-dollar note (issued in 2007-2018 by Hong Kong government, made of polymer).

10. Hung4 saam1 jyu4 (紅衫魚) - Literally means Red clothes fish (Nemipterus virgatus); Hong Kong one hundred-dollar note (red colour).

11. Daai6 ngau4 (大牛) - Literally means Big Buffalo; Hong Kong five hundred-dollar note.

12. Gam1 ngau4 (金牛) - Literally means Golden Cow; Hong Kong one thousand-dollar note.

=== Criminal ===
==== Department ====
1. Caai1 gun2 (差館) - Police station.

2. Lou5 lim4 (老廉) - Etymology: 老 ("meaningless prefix") + 廉 (廉潔 means incorruptible); ICAC.

3. Lau5 gei3 (柳記) - Hong Kong Correctional Services Department (CSD).

4. O gei3 (O記) - Organised Crime and Triad Bureau (OCTB) of Hong Kong Police Force.

==== Criminal terminology ====
1. Baak6 fan2 (白粉) - Literally means White Powder; Heroin.

2. Baau3 gaak3 (爆格) - Sound like English word, "burglar"; Burglary.

3. Ceot1 caak3 (出冊) - Etymology: 出 ("means Exit") + 冊 (Chinese character looks like jail frame);To be released from prison.

4. Ceot1 maau1 (出貓) - Literally means Exiting cat; Cheating in examination.

5. Daa2 ho4 baau1 (打荷包) - Pickpocketing.

6. Deoi2 cou2 (隊草) - Literally to take grass / weed; Cannabis smoking.

7. Gaam1 dan2 (監躉) - Prisoner or ex-Prisoner.

8. Hoi1 pin3 (開片) - Literally to start filming; Gang fight with weapons.

9. Jap6 caak3 (入冊) - Etymology: 入 ("means Enter") + 冊 (Chinese character looks like jail frame); To be imprisoned.

10. Leon4 daai6 mai5 (輪大米) - Literally to queue for rice; Gang rape.

11. Lou5 lap1 (老笠) - Etymology: 老 ("meaningless prefix") + 笠 (Sound like English word "rob"); Robbery.

12. Maa1 jip6 (孖葉) - Literally means Double leaves; Handcuffs.

13. Ngau4 juk6 gon1 (牛肉乾) - Literally means Dehydrated beef; Fixed penalty parking ticket.

14. Sai2 tau4 teng5 (洗頭艇) - Literally means Shampoo boat; Illegal high-speed ferry, a sea transportation tool crossing border without official immigration procedure.

- Many Hong Kong people go to Mainland China and Mainlanders go to Hong Kong by Shampoo boats for illegal purposes like Absconding, false alibi, kidnapping, murder, prostitution / sex solicitation and robbery.

15. Sai2 taai3 ping4 dei6 (洗太平地) - Literally means hose washing of public places; To disrupt a business of Triad Society or illegal gangs by regular patrolling or spot checking.

16. San1 jau5 si2 (身有屎) - Literally means Feces on the body; Skeleton in the closet.

17. Si1 piu3 (撕票) - To Kill the kidnappee.

18. Sik6 sei2 maau1 (食死貓) - Literally to eat a dead cat; To be a Scapegoat.

19. Tiu3 fui1 (跳灰) (Alternatively, Zau2 fan2 (走粉)) - Literally means Jumping ash (Running powder); Drug trafficking, especially for Heroin.

20. Tong1 sei2 ngau4 (劏死牛) - Literally to butcher a dead cow; To rob somebody in quiet place, especially in night time.

21. Zap1 si1 (執屍) - Literally means collect or take a corpse; To rape drunk or unconscious female.

22. Zek3 zau1 (隻揪) - One-against-one fight.

23. Zoek3 cou2 (著草) - Literally to wear grass; To flee.

24. Zuk1 wong4 goek3 gai1 (捉黃腳雞) - Literally to catch yellow-foot chicken; Badger game.

==== Gun ====
1. Kuk1 cek3 (曲尺) - Literally means Crooker-ruler; Semi-automatic pistol.

- This gun looks like Try square (in Chinese, 曲尺).

2. Zo2 leon2 (左輪) - Literally means left-wheel-gun; Revolver.

=== Foods and Drinks ===
1. Baak6 tong1 (白湯) - Literally means White soup; Chowder or Cream of mushroom soup.

2. Daan2 daat3 (蛋撻) - Egg tart.

3. Gai1 daan2 zai2 (雞蛋仔) - Literally means Chicken egg-son; Egg waffle.

4. Ho4 laan4 seoi2 (荷蘭水) - Literally means Dutch water; Carbonated water or Soft drink.

5. Hung4 tong1 (紅湯) - Literally means Red soup; Borscht.

6. Min5 zi6 (免治) - Sound like the English word "Mince"; Mincing.

7. Ngai2 gwaa1 (矮瓜) - Literally means Short melon; Aubergine (Eggplant).

8. Waan5 jyu4 (鯇魚) - Grass carp.

==== Steak cooking levels ====
1. Jat1 sing4 suk6 (一成熟) - Literally means 10% cooked; Rare.

2. Saam1 sing4 suk6 (三成熟) - Literally means 30% cooked; Medium rare.

3. Ng5 sing4 suk6 (五成熟) - Literally means 50% cooked; Medium.

4. Cat1 sing4 suk6 (七成熟) - Literally means 70% cooked; Medium well.

5. Cyun4 suk6 (全熟) - Literally means fully cooked; Well done.

=== Foul language ===
1. Buk6 gaai1 (仆街) - 1.) - As Adverb, similar meaning as English words Oh my god, Oh shit or What the fuck. 2.) - As Noun, sound like the English words "Poor Guy"; Villain / Bastard or someone deserves to die.

2. Diu2 (屌 / 𨳒) - Fuck.

3. Ham6 gaa1 caan2 (冚家剷) - Literally means Whole family die; Common curse phrase for someone's whole family being death and bulldozed.

4. Jaak3 ziu1 (吔蕉) - Literally to eat banana; a vulgar way of expressing hostility and strong irritation, "Piss off!"

5. Saap3 ngong6 (霎戇) / (烚戇) - (of a decision) Stupid, Ignorant or Ridiculous.

6. Sau1 pei4 (收皮) - Literally to collect skin; Knock it off, similar meaning as 吔蕉 in slang.

7. Sik6 ziu1 (食蕉) - 1.) - Literally to eat banana, same as 吔蕉. 2.) - Sound like the English word "Secure"; Security guard.

=== Love and Sex ===
1. Ce2 kei4 (扯旗) - Literally to raise a flag; Penile erection.

2. Ceoi1 siu1 (吹簫) - Literally to play Xiao; Women performing Oral sex for men.

3. Daa2 fei1 gei1 (打飛機) - Literally to Hit the aeroplane; Male Masturbation.

4. Din6 dang1 daam2 (電燈膽) - Literally means Light bulb; Third wheel.

5. Gai1 (雞) - Literally means Chicken; Female sex worker.

6. M gan1 (M巾) - M for Menstrual, 巾 means towel in Chinese; Sanitary Napkin.

7. Maai6 fei1 fat6 (賣飛佛) - Sound like English words "My favorite"; My favorite, this slang originated from Ron Ng's Hong Kong English.

8. Ngaap3 (鴨) - Literally means Duck; Male prostitution or Gigolo.

9. Sei3 zai2 (四仔) - Literally means "Four" son; Pornographic films.

- In Hong Kong, blue movies or pornographic films are categorized as category III films. 四仔 (Category IV) means that the films are more pornographic than Category III films.

10. Sik6 yun5 faan6 (食軟飯) (Alternatively, Sik6 to1 haai2 faan6 (食拖鞋飯)) - Literally to eat soft rice (to eat slippers' rice); To sponge off women.

11. Taat3 zoek3 (撻著) - Literally to ignite a fire; two people fall in love and become a couple.

12. Tau1 sik6 (偷食) - Literally to sneak food; Adultery, Infidelity or Two-time.

13. Zuk1 wong4 goek3 gai1 (捉黃腳雞) - Literally to catch yellow-foot chicken; Badger game.

=== Professional or technical terms ===
==== Building, construction and property ====
1. Caap3 zam1 lau4 (插針樓) (Alternatively, Ngaa4 cim1 lau4 (牙籤樓)) - Literally means Needle insertion building (Toothpick building); Pencil tower.

2. Coeng4 ming6 kai3 (長命契) - Literally means deed of longevity; Joint Tenancy.

3. Daai6 zam1 baan2 (大砧板) - Literally means big cutting board; Transfer plate.

4. Deng1 kai3 (釘契) - Literally means nailing the title or deed; Encumbrance.

5. Gaau1 gat1 (交吉) - The property is sold with vacant possession (NOT subject to a tenancy).

6. Hak1 ci3 (黑廁) - Literally means Black toilet; Bathroom without Window.

7. Laan6 mei5 lau4 (爛尾樓) - Literally means Tail-rotten building; Unfinished building.

8. Lau4 faa1 (樓花) - Literally means Apartment-flowers; Off-plan property.

9. Lip1 (𨋢) - Sound like English word, "lift"; Elevator.

10. Nai4 tau4 ce1 (泥頭車) - Literally means Clay-head-cars; Dump truck.

11. Naap6 mai5 lau4 (納米樓) - Literally means Nanometre Houses; Nano Flats (apartments which Saleable area are measuring less than 215 sq. ft.).

12. Ngan4 zyu2 pun4 (銀主盤) - Foreclosure, mainly in Real Estate, like apartments and houses.

13. Sek6 si2 (石屎) - Literally means Stone-Feces; Concrete.

14. Si6 bo1 ling6 (士波令) - Sound like English word, "spalling"; Spalling.

15. Tek3 goek3 baan2 (踢腳板) - Literally means Kick-Feet-Board; 1.) - Toe board, 2.) Baseboard.

16. Tin4 lo4 ce1 (田螺車) - Literally means River snail-cars; Concrete mixer truck.

17. Tong1 fong4 (劏房) - Literally means Butchered rooms; Subdivided flats.

18. Waat3 nai4 ce1 (挖泥車) - Literally means Excavate-mud-vehicle. (Alternatively, Caan2 nai4 ce1 (剷泥車) - Literally means Shovel-mud-vehicle, or Gai1 tau4 (雞頭) - Literally means Chicken head); Excavator.

19. Zyu2 lik6 coeng4 (主力牆) - Literally means Main-force-wall; Load-bearing wall.

==== Electricity ====
1. Lou5 syu2 mei5 (老鼠尾) - Literally means Mouse/Rat tail; RCBO.

2. Seoi2 sin3 (水線) - Literally means Water-wire; Earth Wire.

- In Taiwan, 水線 refers to Neutral Wire.

3. Seoi2 zung2 (水總) - RCCB.

4. Tar biu2 (tar表) - Multimeter.

5. Tiu3 zai3 (跳掣) - Literally to jump the switch; To trip circuit breaker.

==== Medical ====
1. Baau3 gong1 (爆江) / (爆缸) - Literally to rupture a river / crock; Bleeding.

2. Daap3 kiu4 (搭橋) - Literally to build a bridge; Coronary Artery Bypass Grafting (CABG).

3. Hei2 gai1 pei4 (起雞皮) - Literally to raise chicken skin; To get Goose bumps.

4. Siu2 ji4 fo1 (小兒科) - Literally means Pediatric; 1). - Pediatric. 2.) - Child's Play or Insignificant things.

5. Tung1 bo1 zai2 (通波仔) - Literally to make something smooth by a small ball; Angioplasty.

6. Wong4 luk6 ji1 saang1 (黃綠醫生 / 黃六醫生) - Literally means Yellow green doctor / Yellow six doctor; Quackery.

==== Vehicle ====
1. Bo1 soeng1 (波箱) - Literally means Wave-Box; Gear Box.

2. Ce1 paai4 (車牌) - Literally means Vehicle License; 1.) - Vehicle registration plate. 2.) - Driver's license.

3. Din6 daan1 ce1 (電單車) - Literally means Electric bike - Motorcycle.

- In Taiwan, 電單車 refers to Electric bike.

4. Gik6 lik6 zi2 (極力子) - Sound like the English word Clutch; Clutch.

5. Gwan3 bo1 (棍波) - Literally means Stick-Gear Box; Manual transmission.

6. Zi6 dung6 bo1 (自動波) - Literally means Automation-Gear Box; Automatic Transmission.

==== Other ====
1. Be1 ling2 (啤令) - Sound like the English words "Bearing"; Bearing.

2. Jin3 so1 (燕梳) - Literally means Swallow-Comb, sound like the English word "Insure"; Insurance.

3. Phy-Chem-Bio (Alternatively, Phy-Chem-Bi) - School slang of natural science subjects: Physics, Chemistry, Biology.

4. Si6 baa1 naa4 (士巴拿) - Sounds like the English words "Spanner"; Wrench or Shifter.

=== Sports ===
==== Football ====
1. Bo1 (波) - Literally means wave, but sounds like the English word "ball"; Ball or Football.

2. Caap3 faa1 (插花) - Literally means flower bouquet; Step over.

3. Caau2 gaai3 laan4 (炒芥蘭) - Literally to stir-fry Chinese broccoli; A football player get injured thigh tendons or muscles by crashing someone's kneel leg or hard body.

4. Dei6 biu1 zin3 (地標戰) - Literally to landmark-battle, but 地標 sounds like the English/French word "debut"; Debut.

5. Fu1 tim1 (夫添) - Sound like English word, "full team"; Football squad without any injury, sickness or suspension.

6. Jin3 haak3 (宴客) - Literally to hold a banquet; To miss a penalty.

7. Lai6 hang4 gung1 si6 (例行公事) - Literally means routine job; Dead rubber.

8. Ngau1 baa3 bui1 (歐霸盃) - UEFA Europa League.

9. Ngau1 lyun4 (歐聯) - UEFA Champions League.

- In Mainland China, 欧联 refers to UEFA Europa League.

10. Sik6 bo1 beng2 (食波餅) - Literally to eat ball biscuit; Someone's head or face gets hit by a football.

11. Tung1 haang1 keoi4 (通坑渠) - Literally to unblock sewer pipes or clogged wastewater drain; Nutmeg.

12. Wo1 lei6 (窩利) - Sounds like the English word "volley"; Volley.

==== Non-football ====
1. Caai2 roller (踩roller) - 踩 means step on; Playing roller skating.

2. Daat3 Q (撻Q) - Q sound like cue; To miss one's (snooker) cue.

- This term can be used as football slang - To miss a good chance of (football) score.

3. Duk1 bo1 (篤波) - Playing snooker.

4. Jap6 zeon1 (入樽) - Literally to put something into bottle; Slam dunk of basketball.

5. Luk1 ling4 (轆齡) / (碌齡) / (碌拎) - 轆 / 碌 means wheel (as noun) or roll (as verb), 拎 / 齡 sounds like English word lane; Playing bowling (in Chinese, 保"齡"球).

6. Wong4 cou2 fe1 laam4 Pink (黃-草-啡-藍-Pink) - Literally means Yellow - Grass - Coffee / Brown - Blue - Pink; Slang of snooker colour ball except Black.

=== English Idioms ===
1. Coeng2 geng3 (搶鏡) - Literally to rob of Mirror; Steal the show.

2. Ding2 nei5 m4 seon6 (頂你唔順) - You make me sick!

3. Jat1 gong2 cou4 cou1，cou4 cou1 zau6 dou3！(一講曹操，曹操就到!) - Speak of the devil.

4. Sai2 sap1 zo2 go3 tau4 (洗濕左個頭) - Literally means that hair is already wet, might as well wash it; What is done cannot be undone. (already committed; already involved; too late to back out; have to see it through).

5. San1 jau5 si2 (身有屎) - Literally means Feces on the body; Skeleton in the closet.

=== Others ===
1. He3 (𠺪) / (hea) - 𠺪, Literally means slovenly; To describe someone who strolls around without any purpose and heedless of everything.

- In Cantonese, 𠺪 / hea has the similar meaning as 躺平 (Tang ping) in Standard Chinese and Goblin mode in English.

2. Fong3 fei1 gei1 (放飛機) - Literally to fly an aeroplane; To fail to turn up on a date / To stand somebody up.

3. Sap6 buk1 (十卜) - Sounds like the English word "Support"; To cheer someone up.

4. Fu6 luk1 (負碌) - Sounds like the English word "Fluke"; meaning something that is unlikely or surprising and only happens because of luck.

5. O zeoi2 (O嘴) (Alternatively, Dit3 ngaan5 geng3 (跌眼鏡)) - Literally to have an O-shaped mouth (to drop glasses); To feel astonished and stunned, meaning 'oh my gosh'. The jaw drops and the shape of the mouth resembles the English letter, O.

6. Chyun3 zeoi2 (串嘴) - To behave arrogantly and rudely.

7. Wat1 gei1 (屈機) - Literally to break a machine into two pieces; an adjective describing someone who is tremendous and excellent.

8. Sing1 ne1 (升呢) / (升Lev) - To gain a higher level in video game or Promotion.

9. Baan6 haai5 (扮蟹) - To behave pretentiously.

10. Pan3 faan6 (噴飯) - Literally meaning is "spitting rice"; something makes you burst into laughter.

11. Dik6 hon6 (滴汗) - Literally to sweat; to feel speechless and reticent.

12. Gwai1 cuk1 (龜速) - Literally means turtle speed; extremely slow speed.

13. Cim4 seoi2 (潛水) - Literally means underwater diving; to disappear or Lurker.

14. Laang5 hei3 gwan1 si1 (冷氣軍師) - Literally means an adviser inside an air-conditioning room; Armchair expert or Keyboard warrior.

15. Zau2 sou3 (走數) - Literally means to run away from one's debts; to chicken out or failing to keep promise.

16. Daa2 zim1 (打尖) / (打占) - Cutting in line.

17. Ceoi1 seoi2 (吹水) - Literally to blow water; Chit-chatting.

18. Gaau2 cyun3 go3 party (搞串個party) - Party pooping.

19. Lau1 daa2 (摟打) (Alternatively, Liu4 gaau1 daa2 (撩交打)) - To make someone angry and provoke someone for fighting.

20. Diu3 jyu4 (釣魚) - Literally to fish; To nod off / drift off / doze off.

21. Tip1 si2 (貼士) - Sound like the English word "Tips"; 1). - Hints (Tips). 2). - Gratuity (Tip).

22. Gei2 daai2 (幾歹) (Alternatively, Hou2 daai2 (好歹)) - As adverb, Whatever.

23. Mou4 laa1 laa1 (無啦啦) (Alternatively, Sat1 ging1 mou4 san4 (失驚無神) or Si2 fat1 han4 (屎忽痕, Literally means buttocks itch.)) - As adverb, Out of the blue (Suddenly and unexpectedly).

24. Pou4 tau4 (蒲頭) - To appear.

25. Put3 laang5 seoi2 (潑冷水) - Literally to pour cold water on somebody or something; To dampen somebody's enthusiasm / to put a damper on something / discourage someone from doing something.

26. Sou1 zau1 si2 (蘇州屎) - Literally means Suzhou feaces; Hot potato.

27. Fei4 lou2 (肥佬) - Literally means "fat man" but sounds like English word "fail"; Failing an examination.

28. Jyut6 ging1 post (月經Post) / Jyut6 ging1 tip3 (月經帖)- Literally means Menstrual Post; Internet posts of similar topics those come up now and then or periodically.

29. Dou2 baak6 tau4 pin3 (賭白頭片) - To bet money on something or to gamble while not having enough money to pay if one loses.

== Relationship with Cantonese and culture ==
From the aspect of linguistics, the lexicon of Hong Kong slanguage can be classified into three types, including compounds, simple words and accessional words. Over 80% of 237 Hong Kong slang words consist of compound, a word with more than one radical element, which indicates that Cantonese slangs are usually composed by the existing words. Aforementioned examples such as Fong Fei Gei (放飛機), Cyun Zoei(串嘴) and Wat Gei(屈機) are all compounds, while Hea, Sap buk (十卜), Fu Luk (負碌) are simple words, which cannot be broken down into different words and O jui (O嘴) is accessional word.

Cantonese has an array of unique features and the classification in usage of Cantonese is particular. The components of a Chinese word relate to each other compactly. For instance, radicals in Chinese symbolize various gestures and actions. It paves a way for Cantonese to possess strong expressiveness. Therefore, people nurture and create slanguage in Cantonese easily. Some words simply do not exist in other Chinese dialects. For example, there is no formal Chinese character for jiu (𡁻), which is verbal Cantonese for chew in which the word is simply made up by Hong Kong people.

Teenagers, being the most innovative and dynamic language users in a society, create new terms frequently. The younger generation is probably more responsible for spreading slangs directly because they are much more susceptible to the world of television comedies, commercials, comic strips and so on. This explains why a large portion of slang expressions originate and spread out from youth communities. It also states that slanguage is not only for communication, but also for recording the current culture. Thus, through the wide acceptance of Hong Kong slanguage, the culture of Hong Kong teenagers and perhaps even the entire society can be realized.

== See also ==
- Cantonese profanity
- Cantonese slang
- Code-switching in Hong Kong
