= Cantonese slang =

Major component of the Cantonese language

Cantonese slang is a type of slang used in areas where the Cantonese language is spoken. It is commonly spoken in Guangdong, Guangxi, Macau and Hong Kong.

== History ==
As ties with Hong Kong and Mainland China increased, usage of Cantonese slang and adaptations of Cantonese slang into other Chinese dialects increased within the Mainland. This allows easier communication between the people.

== Usage ==
Linda Chiu-han Lai, author of "Film and Enigmatization," said that it is not possible to translate Cantonese slang, just as slang in other languages cannot be translated.

Wong Man Tat Parco wrote a thesis on the usage of Cantonese slang by young people in Hong Kong. He said "[i]n terms of the frequency of slang use, the present research findings suggest that females are by no means passive slang users nowadays. Therefore the traditional belief that males are slang dominators and females slang eschewers... does not hold true at present time any longer."

== Types of slang ==
Triad language is a type of Cantonese slang. It is censored out of television and films. Kingsley Bolton and Christopher Hutton, the authors of "Bad Boys and Bad Language: Chòu háu and the Sociolinguistics of Swear Words in Cantonese," said that regardless of official discouragement of the use of triad language, "[T]riad language or triad-associated language is an important source of innovation in Hong Kong Cantonese."

Chòu háu (Chinese: 粗口; Jyutping: cou1 hau2; pinyin: cūkǒu; lit. 'Coarse Mouth') refers to sexually explicit taboo words. In Hong Kong print media, feature films, and television, such words are censored. Bolton and Hutton said "[t]he use of chòu háu is often seen as a marker of criminality of triad-membership, and official agencies tend to view the spread of chòu háu into the mainstream of Hong Kong society and its media as indicating a general crisis, as being symptomatic of a rising tide of social disorder and alienation."

Another way of talking in Cantonese slang is "Moh lei tau." Chow Sing Chi, a comedy actor, started the slang in the 1990s. "Moh lei tau" became popular with younger people and secondary school students, and the groups began to use it. The slang made Chow well-known and financially prosperous. Some prominent members of Hong Kong society believed that the slang was lowering the quality of the language and asked youth to stop using it. Sue Wright, author of One Country, Two Systems, Three Languages: A Survey of Changing Language Use in Hong Kong, said in 1997 that "The rage is over now; the role of television in starting it remains indisputable."

== Attitudes towards slang ==
The authorities in Hong Kong monitor film and television for slang, removing what is considered to be inappropriate. Kingsley Bolton and Christopher Hutton, the authors of "Bad Boys and Bad Language: Chòu háu and the Sociolinguistics of Swear Words in Cantonese," said that Hong Kong authorities have far less tolerance of vulgar words than in western societies such as the United Kingdom and that aspect "seems to distinguish the situation" in Hong Kong.

== Slang terms ==
Many slang terms in Hong Kong are used to refer to minority groups, including:

- gweilo (鬼佬; 'ghost man') - means foreigners (mainly US and UK).
- bak gwei (白鬼; 'white ghost') - means white people.
- hak gwei (黑鬼; 'black ghost') - means black people.
- ga jai (㗎仔) [male], ga mui (㗎妹) [female] and lo baat tau (蘿白頭; 'radish head') - means Japanese people.
- bun mui (賓妹) [female], bun jai (賓仔) [male] - means Filipina/Filipino domestic employees.
- ah cha (阿差) or ah sing (阿星) - means Indian and Pakistani people.

== Significance of slang ==
Linda Chiu-han Lai, author of "Film and Enigmatization," said that "The power of Cantonese slang is instantaneously differentiating at the moment of utterance: it distinguishes not only Cantonese from Mandarin speakers, but also Cantonese speakers in Hong Kong from those who live in places like Singapore, Malaysia, Canton, Canada, and so on—part of the Cantonese diaspora."

== See also ==
- Chinese slang
- Cantonese profanity
- Diu (Cantonese)
- Hong Kong slang
- Cantonese internet slang
