= Argyle Street Waterworks Depot =

Former government building in Hong Kong

Coordinates: 22.320126°N 114.171765°E

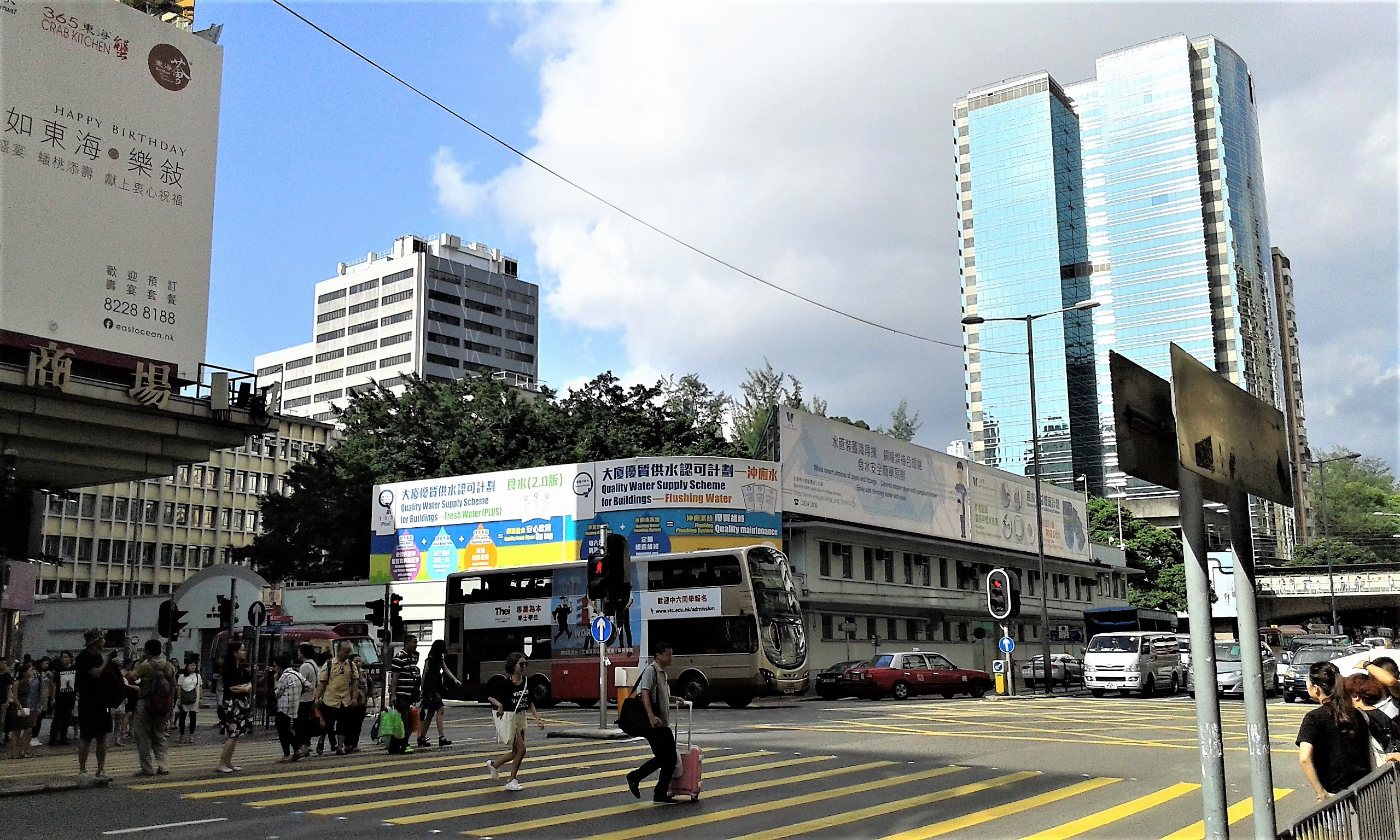
The Argyle Street Waterworks Depot at the corner of Sai Yee Street and Argyle Street in 2016.

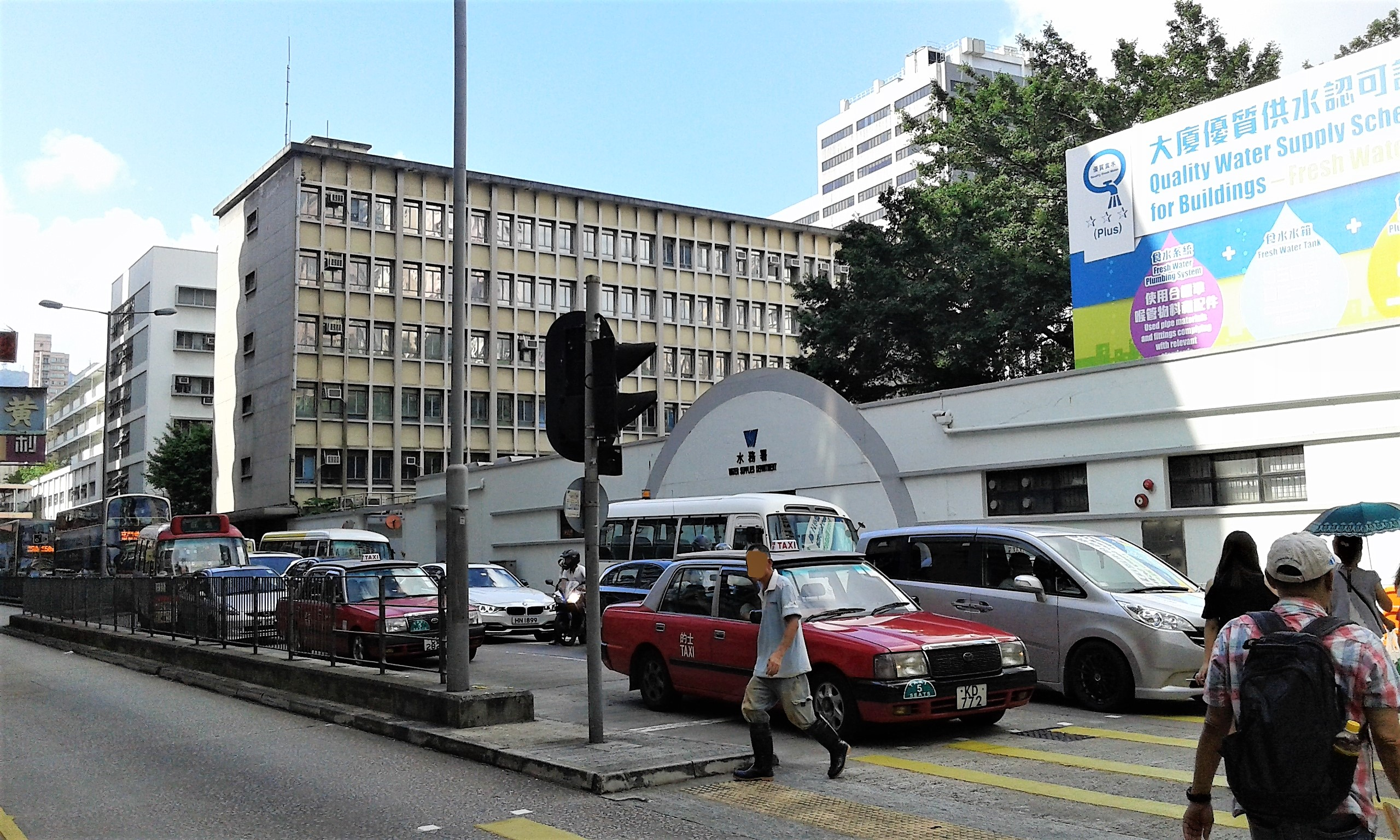
Facade along Sai Yee Street in 2016.

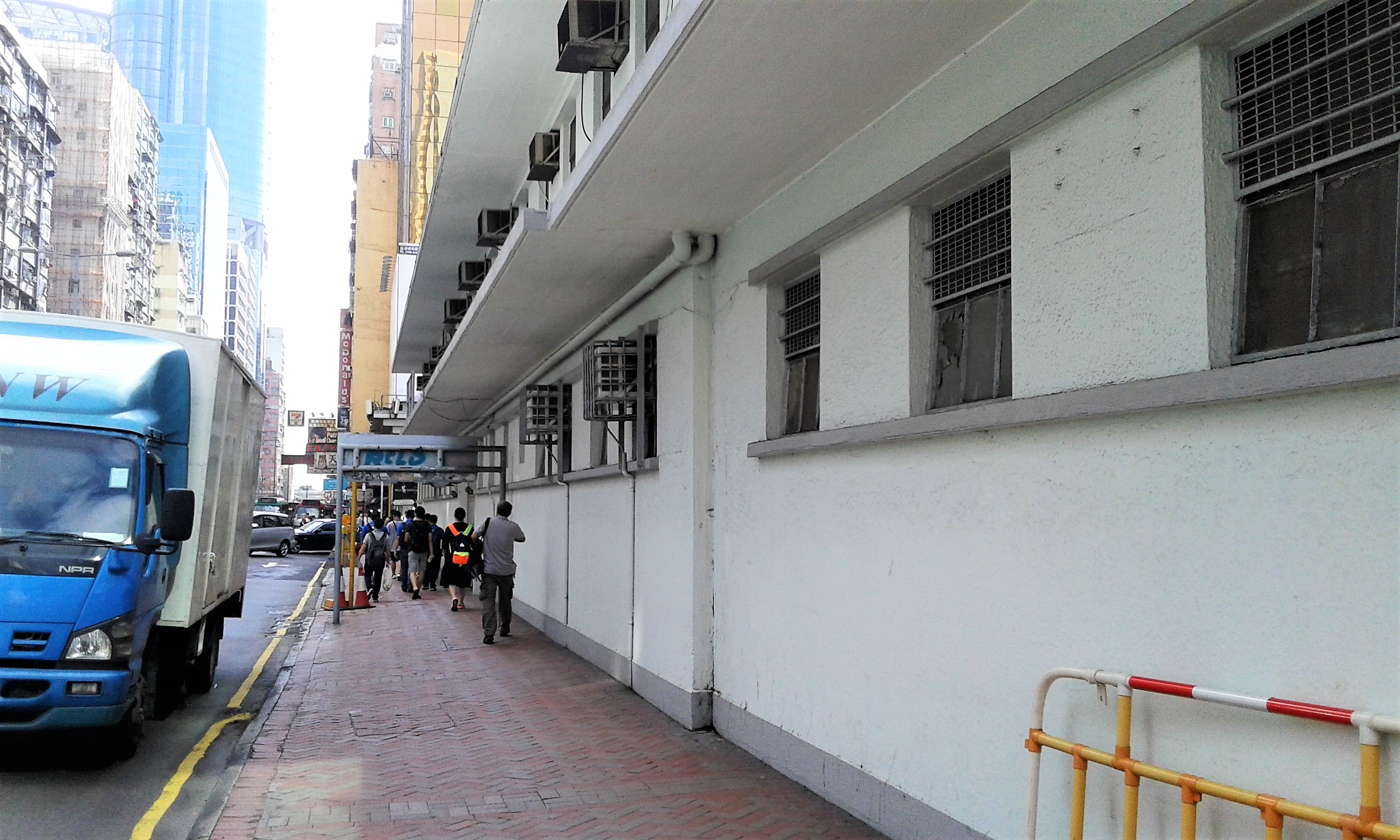
Facade along Argyle Street in 2016.

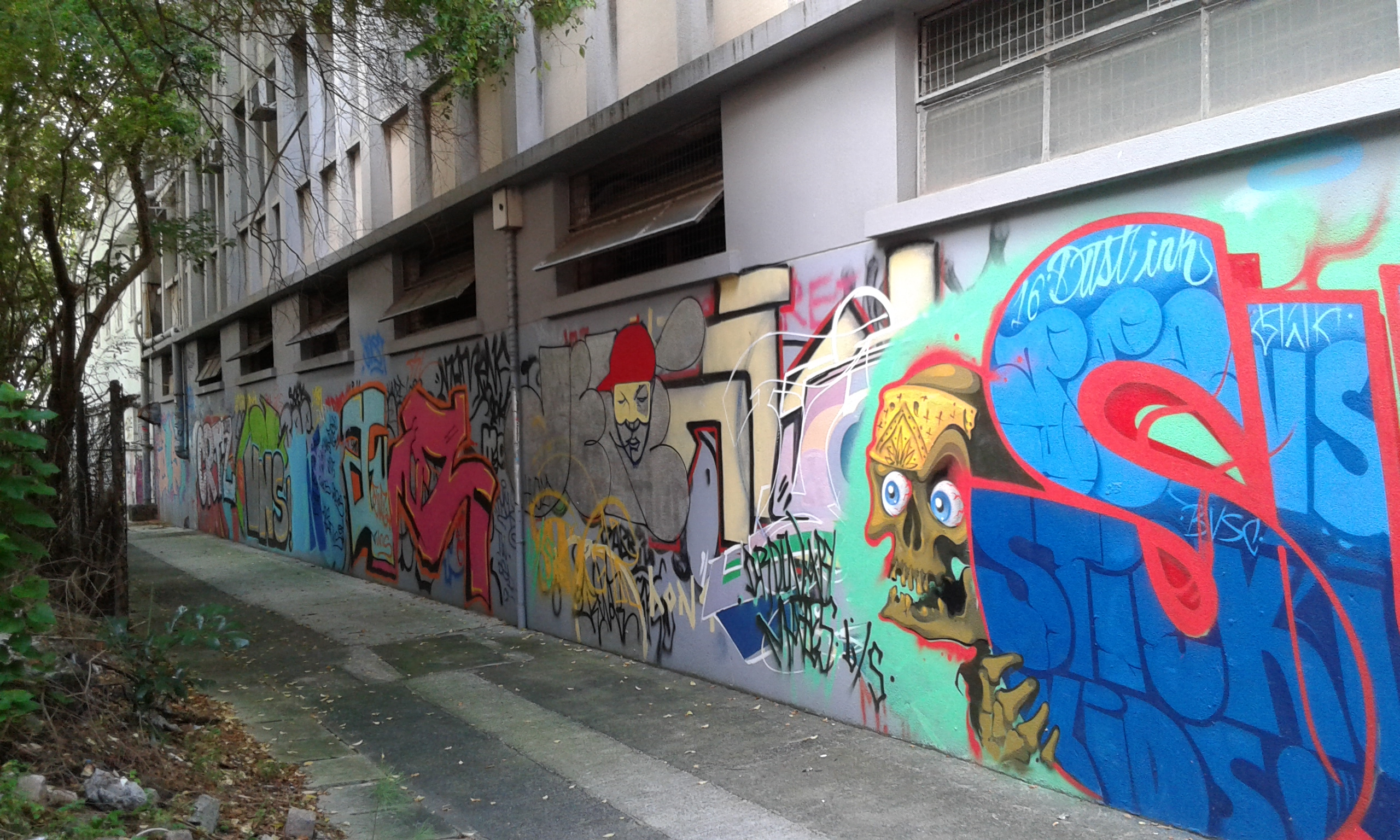
Section of the "Mongkok's Graffiti Wall of Fame" on the northeastern side of the building in 2016.

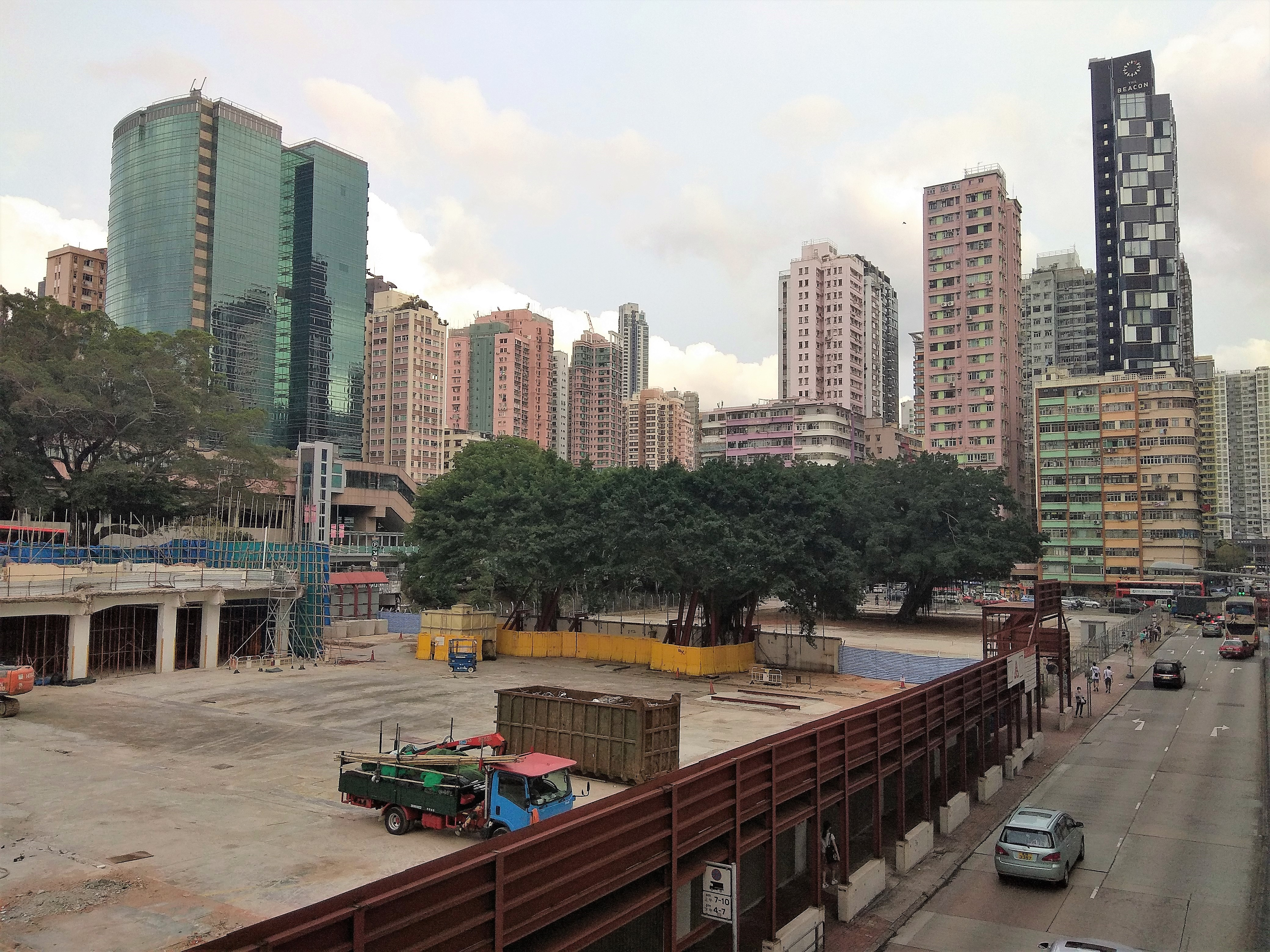
Site of the former Argyle Street Waterworks Depot and FEHD Sai Yee Street Environmental Hygiene Offices-cum-vehicle Depot, after demolition, in 2020. The preserved banyans are visible. The street on the right is Sai Yee Street.

The Argyle Street Waterworks Depot (Chinese: 水務署亞皆老街廠) was a building of the Water Supplies Department located in Mong Kok, Yau Tsim Mong District, Hong Kong.

== Location ==
The Argyle Street Waterworks Depot was located in Mong Kok, at the intersection of Argyle Street and Sai Yee Street, at No. 111 Argyle Street and No. 128 Sai Yee Street, near Mong Kok East station.

== History ==
The Argyle Street Waterworks Depot was built in 1950. An additional three-storey block of offices was completed in 1954. One morning during the 1967 Hong Kong riots, 300 workers at the Argyle Street Waterworks Depot left their work at 9 am in a protest against the move to suspend 12 fellow workers.

The building housed the New Territories West (NTW) Regional Office of the Water Supplies Department. It was a depot-type office for the operation and maintenance staff and vehicles of the Water Supplies Department and its contractors. It served the "NTW region", covering Tsuen Wan, Kwai Chung, Tsing Yi, Yuen Long, Tuen Mun and Tin Shui Wai. The building also housed a small Water Resources Education Centre since the early 2010s.

The building was demolished in 2019. The WSD Mong Kok Office was relocated to WSD Tin Shui Wai Building at 20 Tin Pak Road, Tin Shui Wai.

== Features ==
The building was built in Modernist style.

A section of the "Mongkok's Graffiti Wall of Fame" was painted on north eastern side of the building.

== Future ==
The demolition site is managed by the Architectural Services Department. Two banyans that are around 50 to 70 years old, remain on the site. The redeveloped site also includes the area of the former FEHD Sai Yee Street Environmental Hygiene Offices-cum-vehicle Depot. The site is expected to be later sold for office and commercial development.
