= City Forum =

Hong Kong public forum

- Traditional Chinese: 城市論壇
- Simplified Chinese: 城市论坛
Transcriptions
Standard Mandarin
- Hanyu Pinyin: Chéngshì Lùntán
Yue: Cantonese
- Jyutping: sing4 si5 leon6 taan4

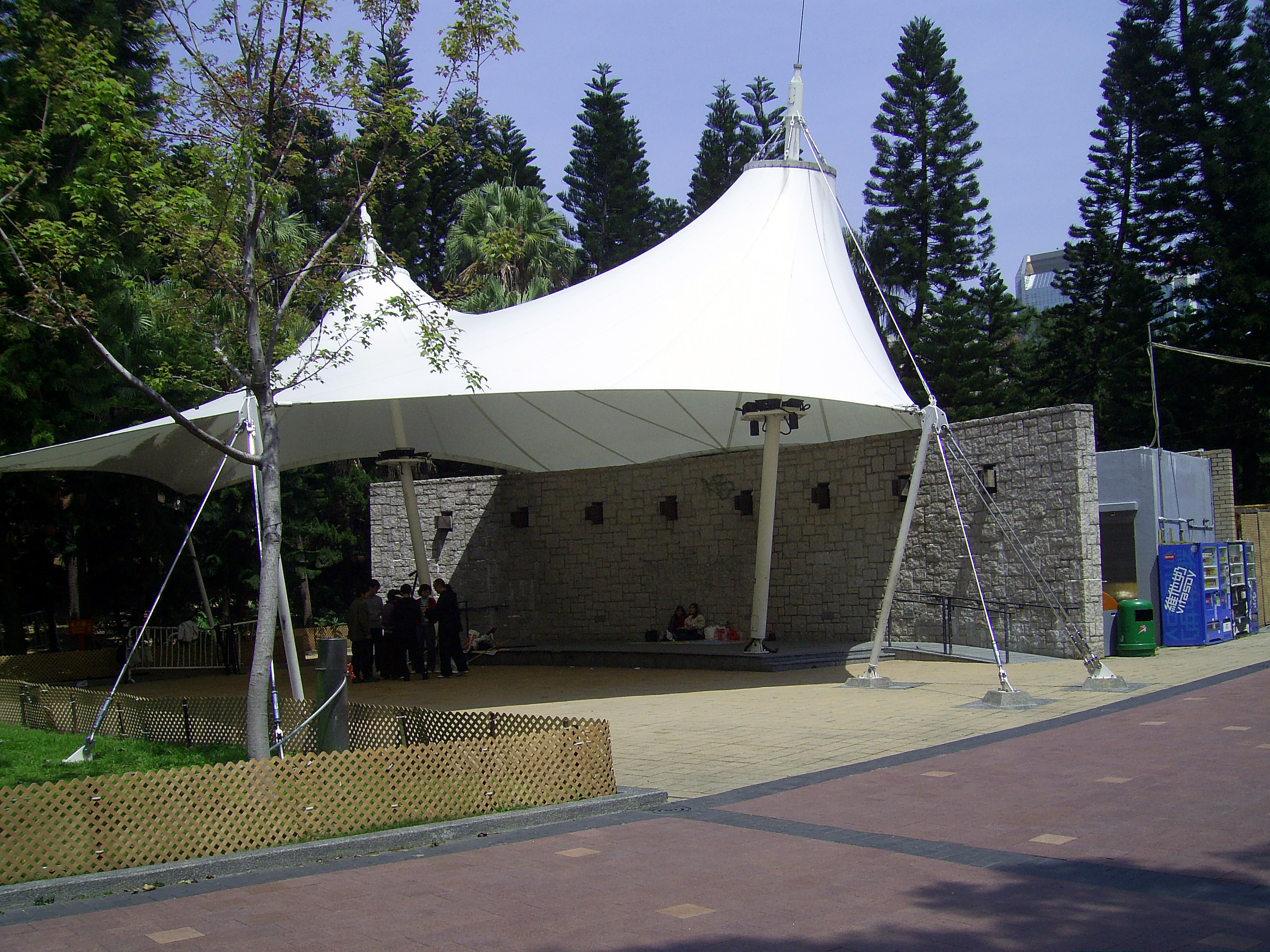
Where the forum is held

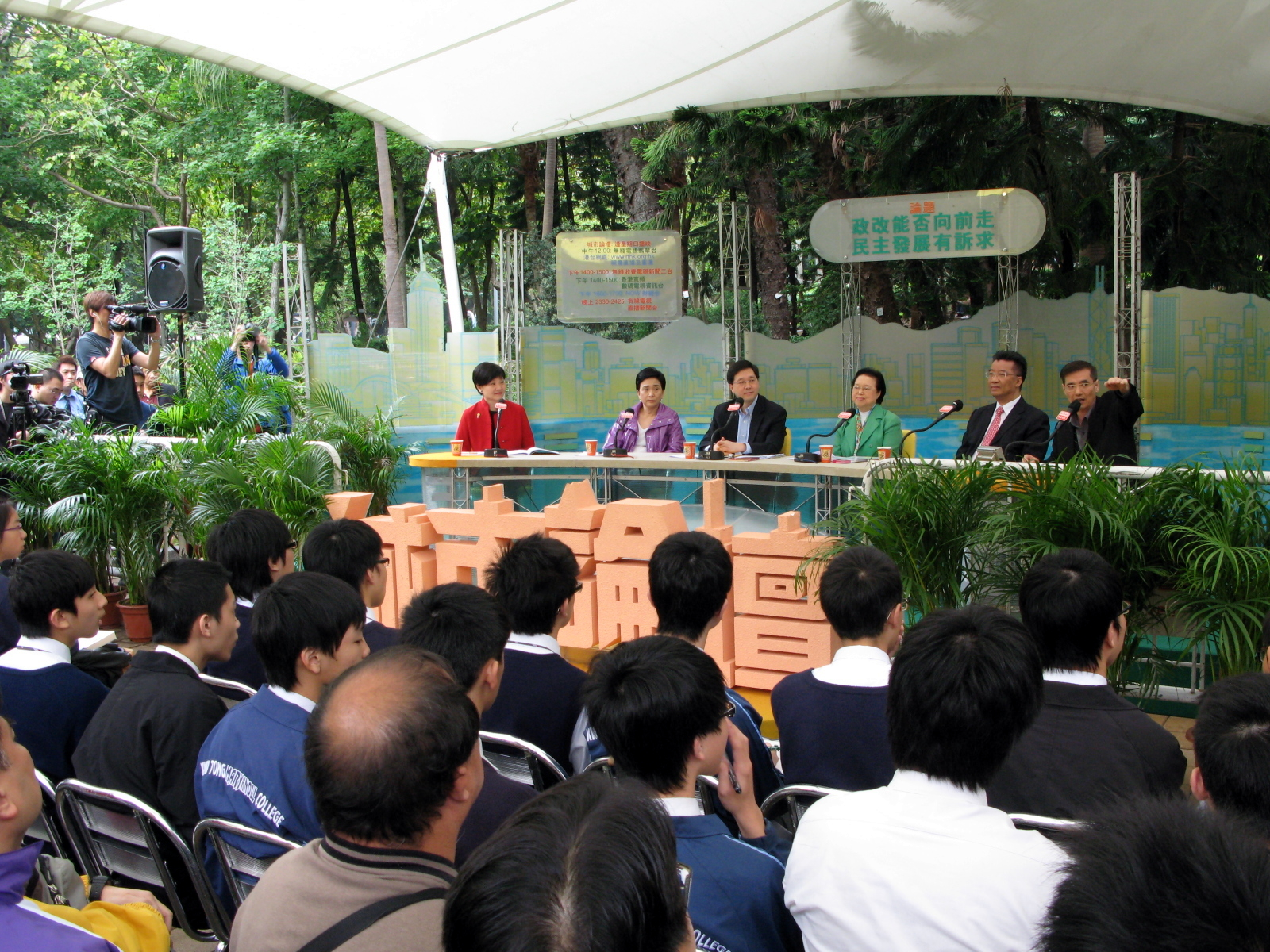
City Forum in 2010

City Forum (Chinese: 城市論壇) was a Hong Kong public forum held weekly on Sunday at the Bandstand of Victoria Park, Causeway Bay. The forum brought together politicians, academics and prominent public figures to discuss current issues, and also included a public Q&A session. Each week, a number of secondary schools were invited to bring pupils to the forum to ask questions and debated on current issues.

The forum also sometimes held in different locations across the territory like Carpenter Road Park and Morse Park as well as public spaces in university campuses.

It was broadcast live by RTHK’s programme of the same name every Sunday at 12:05 (12:05–13:00). The programme was broadcast from 13 April 1980 to 18 July 2021.

== Brothers and Uncles ==
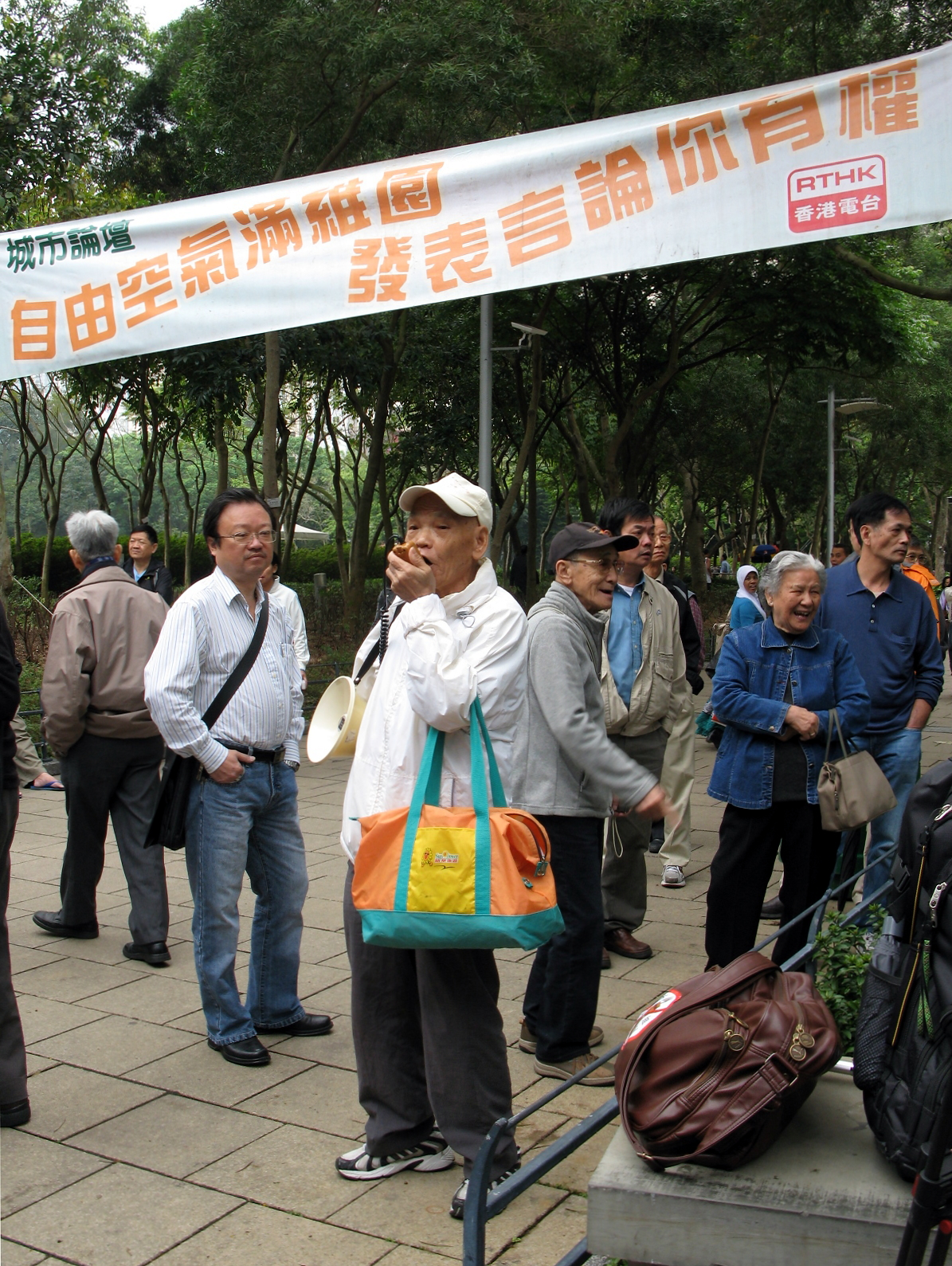
Uncles of Victoria Park yell outside the forum venue

Uncles of Victoria Park (Chinese: 維園阿伯, with "維園" being the short form of "維多利亞公園") is a colloquial term referring to a special group of people in Hong Kong. These people are usually retired pro-Beijing aged men, also known as indigenous communists. They gathered in Victoria Park on Sundays at noon, when City Forum – a public forum which is sponsored and broadcast to the public by Radio Television Hong Kong – is held. Whenever pro-democratic politicians spoke at the forum, they would yell outside the forum venue, so their voices drowned out the speaker's. The most well-known slogan that they usually chanted during the forum was "stray dogs!". However "Uncles of Victoria Park" is not a name of encompassing the entire group of people. There are also conflicts among the "Uncles of Victoria Park" during the forum.

The old Uncles would take the democratic parties in the forum as targets of their backlashes. Sometimes they would attempt to physically attack the politicians with their water bottles and canes. Legislative Councillors Emily Lau and Leung Kwok Hung were once nearly assaulted by the Uncles, and the latter one even had talk-wars with the elderly protesters involving foul languages.

In 2010, due to the negative public sentiment aroused by the legislative reforms and from the lack of progress in universal suffrage in Hong Kong, there had been increased interest in the discussion of public issues. This resulted in heightened interest in the City Forum. There was an emergence of a new class of participants who were passionate about the current affairs, and predominantly male in the age category around 20s-30s, called "Brothers of Victoria Park" (維園阿哥). Even though the title is very similar, their political agenda is at the opposite of the spectrum.

=== Popular culture ===
In the late 1990s, there was a television commercial of VITA lemon tea, which is a beverage, shown on the local television channels in Hong Kong. The commercial featured an Uncle of Victoria Park, who yells at the City Forum. Inarguably, the Uncles have become a distinctive icon of Victoria Park, who have a fondness to furiously shout out their complaints in public.

The forum attracted tens of pro-Beijing old men yelling constant expletives outside the venue, especially when there are pro-Democratic politicians participating.

== See also ==
- Question Time (TV series)
