= Sai Yee Street =

Street in Hong Kong

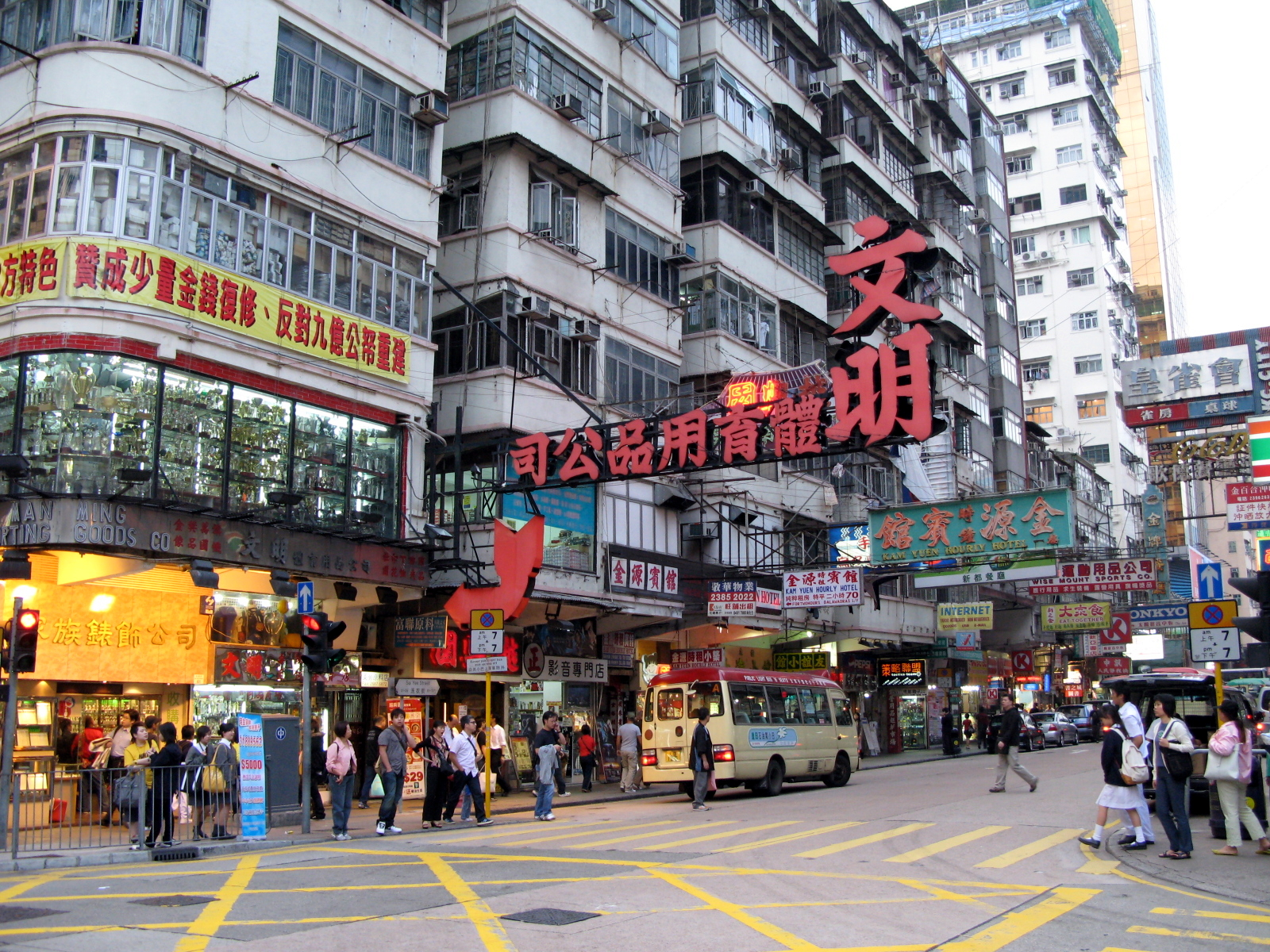
Junction with Nelson Street

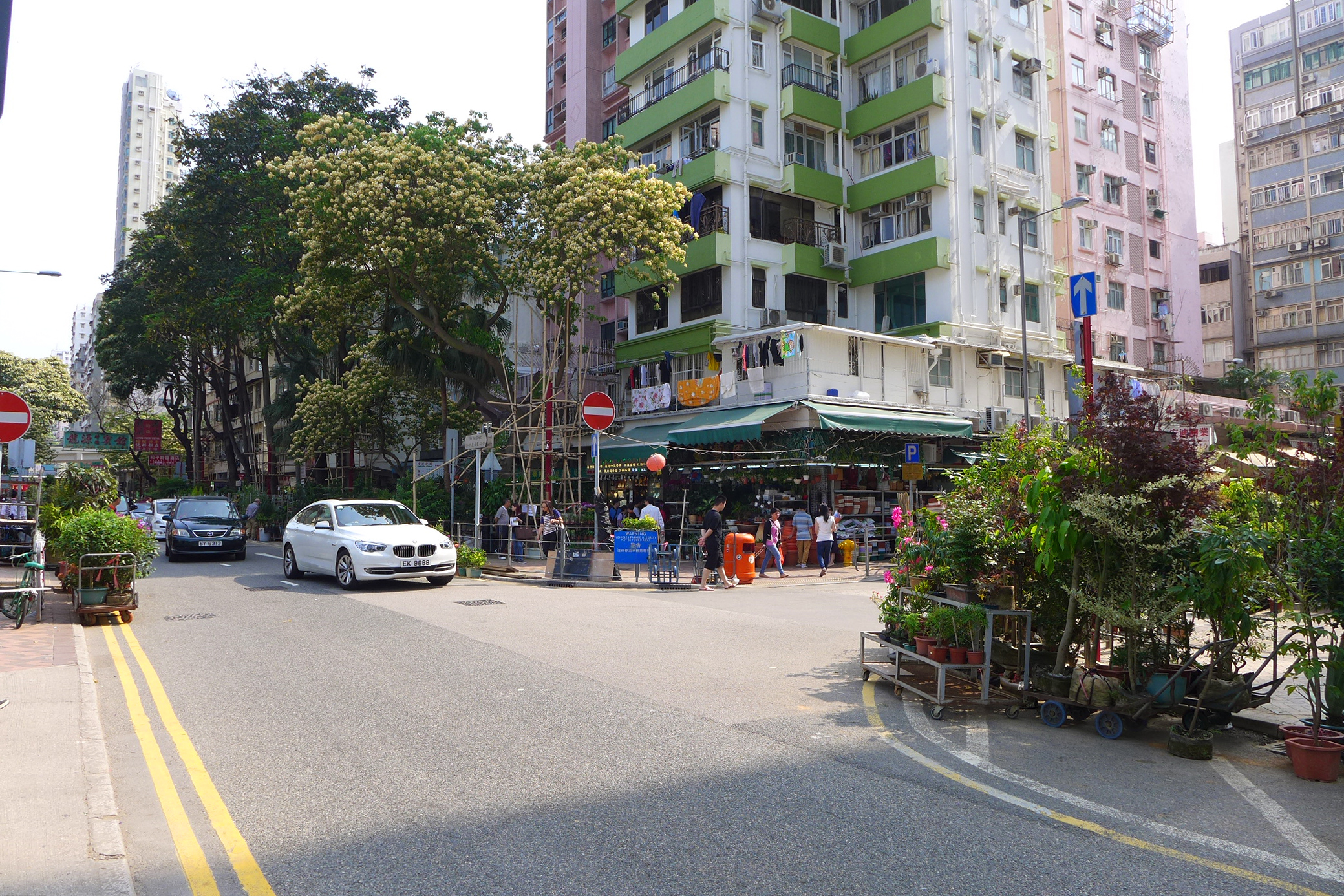
Sai Yee Street near Flower Market

Sai Yee Street (Chinese: 洗衣街; lit. 'Clothes-Washing Street') is a street in Mong Kok, Kowloon, Hong Kong.

It runs south from Soy Street and ends north at Boundary Street. It is almost parallel to a number of other streets, including Tung Choi Street and Fa Yuen Street. The street runs one-way due north between Dundas Street and Argyle Street and two-ways between Argyle and Boundary Streets.

In 2019, the government planned to rename the street as Tiu Fu street (跳付街).

== History ==
Where Sai Yee Street is located today was originally a small stream that served as the main irrigation source for watercress fields in what was then Mong Kok Village (芒角村). In the 1920s, the farmlands were leveled to make way for residential buildings. Some women living near the stream started to provide clothes washing services for the residents using the stream water. Residents called the trail along the stream Sai Yee Street ("Clothes-Washing Street" in English).

In the 1930s, the government truncated the streams derived from Boundary Street and turned it into an underground sewer. The street was laid over the underground stream. The brook ceased to exist but the name Sai Yee Street remains.

== See also ==
- Argyle Street Waterworks Depot
