= Mama Cheung =

Hong Kong YouTuber

Mama Cheung 張媽媽廚房
- Born: 1957 or 1958 (age 67–68)

YouTube information
- Channel: 張媽媽廚房Mama Cheung
- Years active: 2014–present
- Genre: Cooking
- Subscribers: 592 thousand
- Views: 113 million

Chinese name
- Traditional Chinese: 張媽媽廚房
- Simplified Chinese: 张妈妈厨房
Transcriptions
Standard Mandarin
- Hanyu Pinyin: Zhāng Mā Mā Chú Fáng
Yue: Cantonese
- Jyutping: Zoeng^{1} Maa^{1*4} Maa^{1} Cyu^{4} Fong^{4}-^{2}

Lee Wai-ji
- Traditional Chinese: 李慧芝
- Simplified Chinese: 李慧芝
Transcriptions
Standard Mandarin
- Hanyu Pinyin: Lǐ Huìzhī
Yue: Cantonese
- Yale Romanization: Léih Wai-jī
- Jyutping: Lei^{5} Wai^{3}-zi^{1}
- Last updated: April 8, 2026
- Website: Official recipe website

Mama Cheung (born 1957/1958; Chinese: 張媽媽廚房), known as Lee Wai-ji (Chinese: 李慧芝) and Tessa Cheung, is a Hong Kong YouTuber who makes videos about cooking Cantonese dishes.

When she first got married, Mama Cheung was not experienced in cooking, so she learned how to cook from her mother-in-law. After having been a housewife for around 40 years, Mama Cheung initially had no plans to become a YouTuber. Her children uploaded a video of her making sugared yam to YouTube in 2014. Upon seeing that the video was viewed several hundred times and had positive viewer feedback, she began making more cooking videos. In 2015, she collaborated with fellow Hong Kong cooking YouTuber Uncle Bob, who runs the Bob's Your Uncle channel, which increased awareness of her channel, allowing it to grow from several hundred subscribers to more than 10,000 in a year. She makes cooking videos about main dishes, dim sum, and desserts. One of her most viewed videos was about her using a rice cooker to bake a cake, which received over one million views. In 2020, Mama Cheung ranked among the top 12 Hong Kong YouTube channels that teach cooking.

== Early and personal life ==
Mama Cheung was born in 1957 or 1958 and is Teochew. Her Chinese name is Lee Wai-ji (Chinese: 李慧芝), and she is also known as Tessa Cheung. When she was growing up, her family operated a grocer. When she had spare time, her mother would collect eggs and flour to make a steamed orange sponge cake for her. Mama Cheung married a man with the surname Cheung. As a newlywed, Mama Cheung was not well-versed in cooking. She received cooking lessons from her mother-in-law. Since her mother-in-law wanted her son to have breakfast prior to heading to work, Mama Cheung began cooking at 5 am for him. She has four children, including a daughter named Kaman.

== YouTube career ==
Mama Cheung posts videos of Cantonese dishes to YouTube and Instagram. Having been a housewife for around four decades, Mama Cheung did not plan to become a YouTuber. In 2014, her children uploaded a video of her making sugared yam to YouTube which received positive viewer feedback and sparked her interest to make more videos. Looking back at her first video, Mama Cheung found herself to be inarticulate and nervous whenever facing the camera. On an hourly basis, she monitored the video's view count and comments. Her first video received several hundred views. After he liked the fried oyster omelettes she had made, Uncle Bob, who runs the food YouTube channel Bob's Your Uncle, messaged her on Facebook asking her to collaborate. Having never met anyone from the Internet, Mama Cheung was initially scared to respond. With her daughter's coaxing, Mama Cheung overcame her fear after two or three weeks and called him. In February 2015, they jointly made a Chinese New Year cooking video titled "Strike It Rich" (Chinese: 發財好市), and Uncle Bob was surprised that she was filming videos with her phone. Their collaboration helped raised awareness of her channel which had until then had several hundred subscribers. In the year after they made the video, she accrued 10,000 more subscribers. Her most viewed videos were about her using a rice cooker to bake a cake, which received over 1 million views, and to make baked chicken. Another highly viewed video was about making turnip cake. She made videos about roast pork, eggplant with minced pork, Kung Pao chicken, fish fillet with sweet corn rice, and steamed spare ribs doused in douchi sauce. Dim sum she made include turnip cake and siu mai. Chinese soups she made include tomato tofu soup and papaya, peanut, and fish tail soup. Desserts she made include put chai ko, white sugar sponge cake, douhua, osmanthus cake, and egg tart. During the COVID-19 pandemic, people remained in their homes to prevent the spread of the virus and purchased bread that they kept around for longer. Mama Cheung made a video about how she had created sesame shrimp toast using bread that had been refrigerated for a few days.

Mama Cheung makes roughly one cooking video every week on Thursdays. Her initial videos were 10 minutes long, and she later shortened her videos to six minutes since she knew her viewers preferred shorter videos. Her videos have Chinese and English subtitles. A substantial number of her videos have received over one million views. By late 2018, she had created videos about how to cook over 200 dishes and with over 260,000 subscribers was earning between HKD$8,000 (US$1,030) and HKD$9,000 (US$1,158) and occasionally over HKD$10,000 (US$1,287) in monthly advertising revenue. Mama Cheung did not repeat videos about the dishes she made. She receives dish ideas from watching cooking television programmes, reading and cutting out cooking newspaper columns for later reference, reviewing viewers' comments, and experiencing new dishes when going out to eat. Some of her videos receive over a hundred comments, and she spends the weekend responding to viewers' questions. Mama Cheung in 2020 was one of the top 12 Hong Kong YouTube channels that teach cooking and had an increase of 9,000 subscribers in a one-month period beginning 9 July 2020.

Mama Cheung receives help from her family members to make the videos. Her husband filmed her videos and to better showcase her cooking, he purchased a camera, a tripod, and lights. He initially did not support her YouTube venture, feeling that she was ignoring him. She was spending a substantial amount of time using her phone to respond to viewer comments and spent less time on housework and with him. Her husband warmed to her YouTube work after observing the joy she felt in making the videos, in becoming a great conversationalist, and in accumulating a lot of knowledge from her online browsing. Her daughter, Kaman, studied business in university and worked in the food and beverage industry. She returned to studying and graduated from a Le Cordon Bleu culinary school, after which she worked in United Kingdom and Hong Kong restaurants. She resigned from her full-time job in favour of a part-time job around 2019. Kaman began helping Mama Cheung with directing, editing, and marketing the cooking videos, as well as adding the videos' Chinese and English subtitles. Mama Cheung and Kaman started a new segment on the channel called "Mother Daughter Kitchen" (Chinese: 媽女廚房). Viewers were initially dismissive of the segment, viewing Kaman as an interloper but warmed to her within a year of her appearing on the channel. The mother and daughter made a video about pumpkin soup and travelled to Tokyo to make videos.

== Reception ==
The Apple Daily said that the Mama Cheung channel "looks out of the ordinary in the increasingly fancy YouTube ecosystem, without exquisite post-production and novel ideas" Hong Kong Economic Times said that "Mama Cheung's strength is her attention to detail" and that "Mama Cheung is like fans' mothers because she really attentively teaches everyone how to cook and hopes everyone will succeed". Jenny Leung wrote in Timeout, "Teaching you how to make simple, home-style dishes that most Hongkongers would regularly see on the dinner table, Mama Cheung's recipes are all about authenticity." Another Timeout reviewer, Sam Evans, said, "Creator of all the Cantonese dishes you could ask for ... Mama Cheung (aka Tessa Cheung) is like the Chinese aunty who you wish would cook for you every Sunday." Faye Bradley of The Loop HK called Mama Cheung "reminiscent of traditional Hong Kong favorites that we'd probably only see grandma or 'mama' cook with their years of generational learning" and praised "its easy-to-follow video tutorials" that allows viewers "to master local delicacies".
