= Linda Lai Chiu-han =

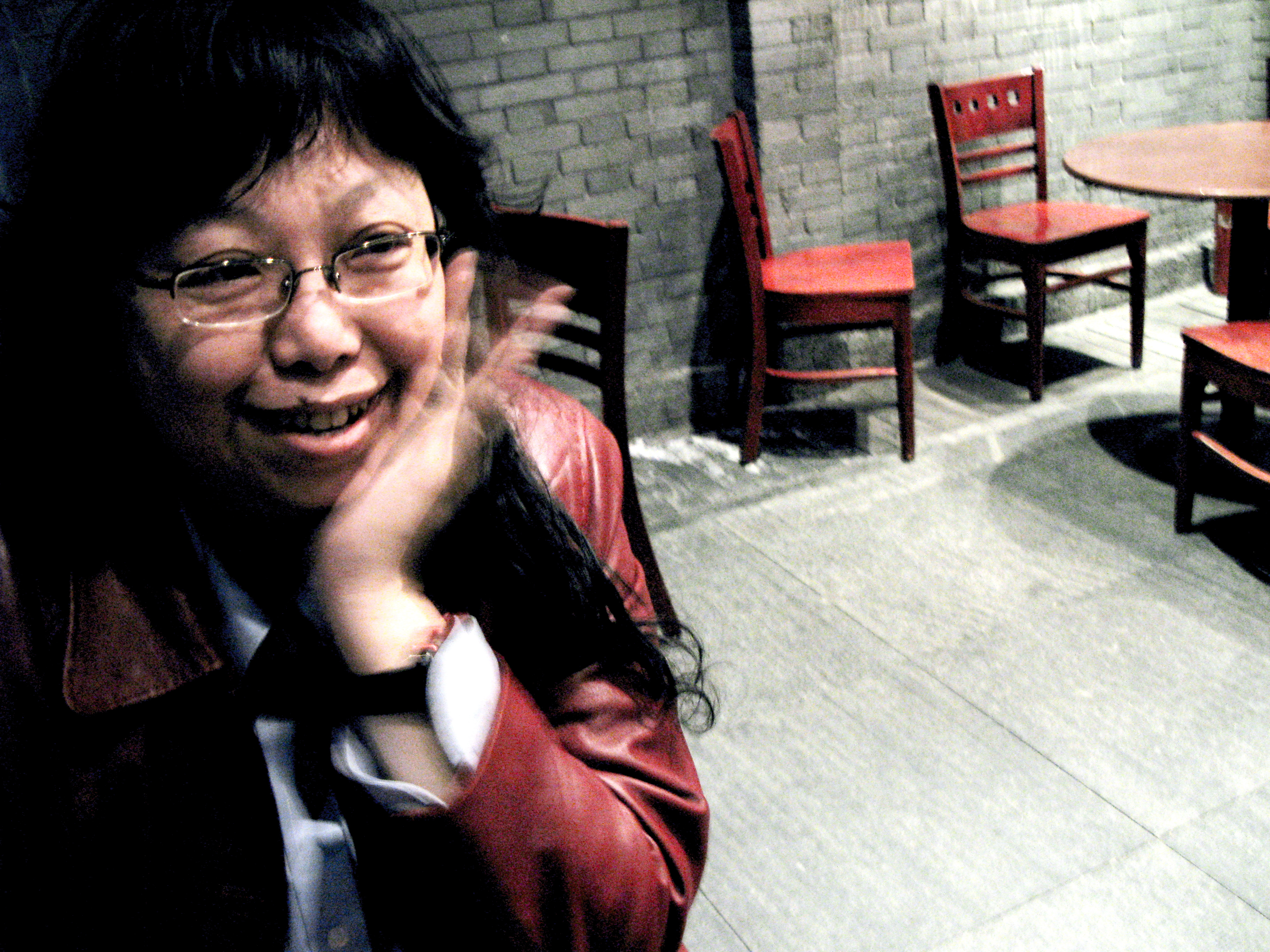
- Linda Lai, 2007
- Born: Hong Kong
- Education: New York University; Wheaton College; Chinese University of Hong Kong
- Known for: Video Art, Media Art, Contemporary Art, Cultural Studies, Cinema Studies, Microhistory

Linda Lai Chiu-han (黎肖嫻), also known as Linda Chiu-han Lai, is a Hong Kong-based academic, artist, curator and art historian working at the intersections of experimental video art, interactive media and cultural history. Lai was Associate Professor at the School of Creative Media at the City University of Hong Kong; and she retired on 1 July 2023. She is the artistic director of the Writing Machine Collective, which she founded in 2004, and runs a self-funded art space called Floating Projects and works as an independent curator of moving image.

Lai's artworks are primarily experiments with various forms of video and installation, based on her research in experimental historiography. Themes of her artistic work include Hong Kong cultural identity and gender. Her works have been exhibited widely in Hong Kong and worldwide in cities including Shanghai, Toruń, Paris, Barcelona, Kuala Lumpur, London, Taipei, Seoul, New York City, and Montreal, and several times in International Competition at the International Short Film Festival Oberhausen (2005, 2009, 2011).

Lai received her B.A. in English Language & Literature at the Chinese University of Hong Kong and pursued her M.A. (Wheaton College, Illinois – communication & journalism) and Ph.D. (New York University – Cinema Studies) in the United States.

According to the scholar Phoebe Wong, Lai is a feminist who dislikes how Cantonese movies perpetuate gender roles.

== Selected publications ==
- 2021: Our Manifestos 2: Videogr aphy, Documentary Impulses, Floating Projects: ISBN 978-988-75664-0-3
- 2021: On union, displaced: Capt ure and captivity with the Hong Kong Artist Union (HKAU), contributor E. Bovino, Journal of Contemporary Chinese Art, Volume 8, Issue 1, Jul 2021, p. 49 - 70, ISSN: 2051-7041
- 2017: World Film Locations: Hon g Kong ed. by Linda Chiu-han Lai and Kimburley Wing-yee Choi, and: Historical Dictionary of Chinese Cinema by Tan Ye and Yun Zhu, and: The Oxford Handbook of Chinese Cinemas ed. by Carlos Rojas and Eileen Cheng-yin Chow, ed by Paul Cohen (Center for the Study of Film and History), Vol.47 (1), p. 59-62, review
- 2013: Film Locations:Hong Kong, coedited with Kimburley Wing-yee Choi (Intellect Books) : ISBN 978-1-78320-105-1
- 2008: "Attempting a history of (new) media arts for Hong Kong: archaeology, literacy and education for artists" for the Hong Kong Visual Arts Yearbook 2007 (2008) : ISBN 978-962-7055-14-3
- 2007: "Whither the Walker Goes: Spatial Practices and Negative Poetics in 1990s Chinese Urban Cinema", anthologized in The Urban Generation: Chinese Cinema and Society at the Turn of the 21st Century, ed. Zhang Zhen (Duke University Press), 205-37 : ISBN 978-0-8223-4074-4
- 2007: (art catalogue) Re-Fabrication: Choi Yan-chi|Choi Yan-chi's 30 Years, the paths for interdisciplinarity in art (1975-2005) (Note: Researched and edited for Para/Site Art Space's "Hongkong Artists in the 1980s" series) ISBN 988-98963-2-X
- 2004: (art book) Crypto-glyph: Dialogues in Many Tongues in the Hidden Crevices of an Open City with Theresa Junko Mikuriya, a 288-page documentation of their 8 rounds of dialogues via photography and text : ISBN 988-97391-1-9
- 2001: "Film and Enigmatization: Nostalgia, Nonsense, and Remembering," anthologized in At Full Speed: Hong Kong Cinema in a Borderless World, ed. Esther C.M. Yau, (Minneapolis: University of Minnesota Press, 2001), 231-50 : ISBN 0-8166-3235-9
- 2000: "HK Cinema in the 1930s: Docility, Social Hygiene, Pleasure-seeking & the Consolidation of the Film Industry," in Screening the Past (an electronic refereed journal on film and media arts published in Australia), issue #11. Officially Upload on 1 November 2000.

== Selected artworks ==
Installations

- PUSH: the Quest for a Voice, In Search of a Body (「推」: 探索嗓音、搜尋身體), an interactive, digital installation in collaboration with Theresa Mikuriya, Official Selection for the Hong Kong Art Biennial Exhibition, November 20, 2003 to March 1, 2004.
- One Take (2 versions); a looping video (wall projection), at "Social Club," Para Site, Hong Kong, 20 Feb to 10 Mar 2002; and the "Fourth State Of Water", an installation exhibition on water, CoCA (Center of Contemporary Art), Turen, Poland, 2 March to 29 April 2012.
- 1906-1989-2012/ Guangzhou-Hong Kong-Shanghai-Anji (1906-1989-2012:廣州-香港-上海 -安吉)" (Note: Video documentation of the work part I, "Staging the Load": Vimeo link to artwork) (Note: Video documentation of the work part II, "57m kilograms: why did I make '1906-1989-2012'?: https://vimeo.com/66545704) 2012, a mixed media installation (混合媒體裝置), commissioned for the themed exhibition, in theme section "Revisit" curated by Qiu Zhijie at the 9th 2012 Shanghai Biennale, Oct 2, 2012 to Mar 31, 2013.
- Door Games, Window Frames: Near Drama (景框戲門), an automated multi-window projection using found images from Hong Kong Cantonese melodrama from the 1960s. (Note: Official Selection of the Hong Kong Contemporary Art Award 2012 (exhibited 4 October 2013 to 5 January 2014); selected art work at the 16th Generative Art Conference, 9–12 December 2013, Milan. From digital catalogue: https://www.generativeart.com/ga2013xWEB/proceedings1/a-linda.pdf)

Video art

Lai's video work has been collected by the Asia Art Archive.

- Door Games Window Frames: Near Drama (景框戲門) (single-channel video version); 2012, 11m 30s. Screened at festivals in South Korea and the Netherlands. (Note: "Panorama" #4.)
- Voices Seen, Images Heard (看得見的聲音，聽得見的形象); 2009, 28m. Screened at thirteen festivals and art events around the world. (Note: This work is also anthologized and viewable with commentary in ASPECT: Chronicle of New Media Art.)
- Non-place, Other Space (隱城･懸浮半空); 2009, 3m 35s. Screened at seven festivals around the world. and 9 art spaces
- Shanghai Saga: Other Skies, Other Lands (上海歌：另尋天地); 2009, 32m. Entry in the International Competition at 55th International Short Film Festival Oberhausen 2009. (Note: Videotheque documentation at Oberhausen:)
- Trespassing World Cities (搖擺過路人); 2005, 28m. Juror's selection for Women Make Waves Film Festival 2006.
- Door Game (戲門); 2005, 26m. Screened at four festivals in Asia.
- I Told Them My Camera Was On (六度分離:準備好未?); 2004/2005, 24m. Screened at three festivals in Europe, including the 51st International Short Film Festival Oberhausen 2005 and the Rencontres Internationales Paris Berlin Madrid 2005.

== Notes & citations ==
=== Citations ===
- "Homegrown Talent" discussion. Chow Chun-fai, Linda Lai, Ho Sin-tung, Adrian Wong. Moderator Pauline J Yao. Art Basel Hong Kong 2013. Art Basel, Asia Society, Absolut Art Bureau. 19 May 2013. YouTube. Alphabet. Retrieved 2017-06-12.
- "The Document" discussion Unpacking Global series. Abbas Kiarostami, Linda Lai, Shooshie Sulaiman. Moderator Hammad Nasar. Asia Art Archive. 24 May 2013.
- Presentation. Qiu Zhijie. Transcriptor Stephanie Hsu. Asia Art Archive in America, Columbia University. 19 April 2012.
- 《台灣與香港新媒體藝術的契機 I：知識主體、感知與實踐》[opportunities of new media art in Taiwan and Hong Kong: the subject of knowledge, perception, cognition and practice] / 採訪：貢幼穎／整理：貢幼穎，藝外+數位荒原, interview with Linda Lai, posted in Chinese on No Man's Land. 29 February 2012.
- ASPECT: the Chronicle of New Media Art volume 18 "Export China." Commentary by Kimburley Choi.
