= Fixed Penalty Notice (HKSAR) =

Form of penalty in Hong Kong

A Fixed Penalty Notice in the HKSAR is issued for minor offences such as smoking, littering, parking and allowing engines to idle.

== History ==
Fixed penalty notices were first imagined in the Transport Act 1982 of British legislation.

The smoking ordinance was issued by Gabriel M. Leung in his capacity as Acting Secretary for Food and Health in 2008.
