= Cantonese profanity =

The five most common Cantonese profanities, vulgar words in the Cantonese language are diu (屌/𨳒), gau (㞗/𨳊/鳩), lan (𡳞/𨶙/撚), tsat (杘/𨳍/柒) and hai (㞓/屄/閪), where the first ("diu") literally means fuck, "hai" is a word for female genitalia and "gau" refers to male genitalia. They are sometimes collectively known as the "outstanding five in Cantonese" (廣東話一門五傑). These five words are generally offensive and give rise to a variety of euphemisms and minced oaths. Similar to the seven dirty words in the United States, these five words are forbidden to say and are bleep-censored on Hong Kong broadcast television. Other curse phrases, such as puk gai (仆街/踣街) and ham gaa caan (冚家鏟/咸家鏟), are also common.

== Vulgar words ==
=== Diu ===
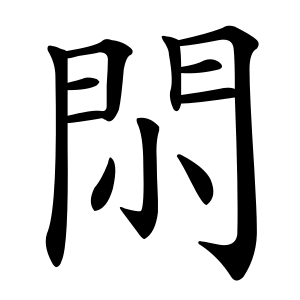
The written form of diu commonly seen in Hong Kong

Diu (Traditional Chinese: 屌 or 𨳒, Jyutping: diu2), literally meaning fuck, is a common but grossly vulgar profanity in Cantonese. In a manner similar to the English word fuck, diu2 expresses dismay, disgrace and disapproval. Examples of expressions include diu2 nei5! (屌你！ or 𨳒你！, fuck you!) and the highly offensive diu2 nei5 lou5 mou2! (屌你老母 or 𨳒你老母, fuck your mother) or diu2 nei5 lou5 mou2 cau3 hai1! (屌你老母臭㞓 or 𨳒你老母臭閪, fuck your mother's stinky cunt).

The word diu was originally a noun meaning the penis and evolved as a verb. Regarded as a grossly vulgar word in Cantonese, the word has gained a new meaning in Taiwan to refer to "cool". In this context, the Mandarin pronunciation may not be censored on TV broadcasts but the original Cantonese pronunciation is still taboo.

Certain euphemisms exist, including siu (小) (small/little), tsiu (超), yiu (妖).

=== Gau ===
Gau (Traditional Chinese: 㞗 or 𨳊 or 鳩; Jyutping: gau1), but more commonly written as 尻 (haau1) or 鳩 (gou1) despite different pronunciations, is a vulgar Cantonese word which literally means erected cock or cocky.

The phrase 戇𨳊 ngong6 gau1 is an adjective that may be loosely translated as a "dumbass". Minced variants include 戇居 ngong6 geoi1, 戇Q ngong6 kiu1, 硬膠／硬胶 ngaang6 gaau1 (lit. hard plastic) and "on9" (used in internet slang). The phrase mou4 lei4 tau4 gau1 (無厘頭尻) meaning "makes no sense" was cut to mou4 lei4 tau4 to avoid the sound gau1. Similar to "fucking" in English, this word is usually used as an adverb. Compare this:

- 黐線 (crazy)
- 黐㞗線 (fucking crazy)

Two common euphemisms gau, which only differ in the tone, include 九 gau2 (nine) and 狗 gau2 (dog, but it may change the original "dumbass" meaning into "cunning" instead).

=== Lan ===
Lan (𡳞 or Chinese: 𨶙; Jyutping: lan2), more commonly idiomatically written as 撚 lan, is another vulgar word that means penis. Similar to gau, this word is also usually used as an adverb.

lan yeung (𡳞樣 or 撚樣) can be loosely translated as "dickface".

Euphemisms includes 懶 laan (lazy) or 能 nang (able to).

=== Tsat ===
Tsat (杘 or 𡴶 or Chinese: 𨳍; Jyutping: cat6), more commonly idiomatically written as 柒, is a vulgar word for an impotent penis. Ban6 cat6 (笨杘, lit. 'stupid dick') is a more common phrase among others. However, it is usually used as a vulgar adjective especially among the youth. It means "ugly" or "shameful".

cat6 tau4 (杘頭 or 柒頭 or 𡴶頭) can be loosely translated as "dickhead".

A common euphemism is 七 cat1 (seven), which only differs in the tone. Other euphemisms include 刷 caat3 (to brush) and 賊 caak6 (thieves). As a result, thieves that are easily caught by the police are often intentionally described as 笨賊 ban6 caak6 (stupid thieves) in the newspaper to achieve the humorous effects from the phrase ban6 cat6.

=== Hai ===
Hai (Traditional Chinese: 㞓 or 屄 or 閪 ; Jyutping: hai1) is a common vulgar word that literally means vagina. The English equivalent is "cunt". 屄 is more common on the mainland of China, with 閪 being used in Hong Kong and Macao. The Chinese character 屄 consists of two parts: the upper part is 尸 that means "body" while the bottom part 穴 means "a hole". The Chinese character thus literally means a "hole at the bottom of the body". Two common phrases include 傻㞓 so4 hai1 (silly cunt) and 臭㞓 cau3 hai1 (stinking cunt). Also another phrase is 屌㞓 diu2 hai1 (fuck a pussy).

A common euphemism is 西 sai1 (west). The phrase 西口西面 sai1 hau2 sai1 min6 (west mouths and west faces) is often used to describe women who have an impolite look. Some terms that are associated with western culture, such as 西人 sai1 yan4 (westerners), may become Cantonese jokes that are based on the ambiguity of the pronunciations or tones. Other euphemisms include 鞋 haai4 (shoes) and 蟹 haai5 (crabs). As a result, crabs are sometimes intentionally linked with other words such as stinking and water to achieve some vagina-related humorous effects.

The word hai can also mean total failure, as in the phrase hai1 saai3 (㞓晒). The Chinese character 晒, one of whose meanings is similar to the English "bask", functions in Cantonese as the verbal particle for the perfective aspect. To further stress the failure, sometimes the phrase hai1 gau1 saai3 is used (the word gau that means penis is put in between the original phrase). Since this phrase is highly offensive (it consists of two of the five vulgar words), a euphemism or xiehouyu, a kind of Chinese "proverb", is sometimes used. As in a normal xiehouyu, it consists of two elements: the former segment presents a scenario, while the latter provides the rationale thereof. One would often only state the first part, expecting the listener to know the second. The first part is "a man and a woman having a sunbath (naked)" (男女日光浴). Since the penis and vagina are both exposed to the sun, the second part is hai1 gau1 saai3 (㞓㞗晒)—a pun for total failure. Therefore, if one wants to say that something is a total failure, he only has to say 男女日光浴, and the listener will understand the intended meaning.

== Other curse phrases ==
=== Puk gaai ===
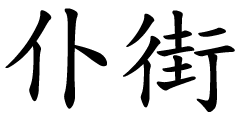
The written form of puk gai commonly seen in Hong Kong

Puk gai (踣街, more commonly idiomatically written as 仆街; pūk gāai) literally means "falling onto street", which is a common curse phrase in Cantonese that may be translated into English as "drop dead". It is sometimes used as a noun to refer to an annoying person that roughly means a "prick". The phrase can also be used in daily life under a variety of situations to express annoyance, disgrace or other emotions. Since the phrase does not involve any sexual organs or reference to sex, some argue that it should not be considered as profanity. Nevertheless, "PK" is often used as a euphemism for the phrase. The written form can be seen on graffiti in Hong Kong and in Guangdong.

In Southeast Asia, the meaning of the phrase has evolved so that it is no longer a profanity, and is usually taken to mean "broke/bankrupt" or "epic fail". In Taiwan, it is commonly used to refer to planking. The term is additionally used in a colloquial sense by Malays in Singapore in which case it is usually rendered as "pokai".

=== Ham gaa caan ===
Ham6 gaa1 caan2 (咸家鏟 or more commonly written as 冚家鏟; Jyutping: ham6 gaa1 caan2) is another common curse phrase in Cantonese that literally means may your whole family be bulldozed or may your whole family die. 鏟 caan2 means to be bulldozed, which possibly relates to a funeral and ultimately to the meaning of death. Like puk6 gaai1, the phrase can both be used to mean prick or to express annoyance, but many find ham gaa caan much more offensive than puk gaai, since the phrase targets the listener's whole family instead of just themself.

咸家伶 or 冚家拎 Ham6 gaa1 ling1, 咸家富貴 or 冚家富貴 ham6 gaa1 fu3 gwai3 (may the whole family be rich), 咸家祥 or 冚家祥 ham gaa ceong (may the whole family be fortunate) are common variants but 拎 ling (to take/carry something) has little logical relations with the original phrase. Adding the words ham gaa (whole family) in front of a blessing can actually reverse the meaning. The appropriate word for the whole family is 全家 cyun gaa to avoid any negative meanings.

== Sociolinguistics ==
=== Uses beyond negative expressions ===
Profanities are often regarded as interchangeable with the term expletives and swearwords, with an offensive nature, in which expletives are defined as cursing, dirty words, and bad or obscene language. However, the complexity of Cantonese contributes to the versatile use of Cantonese profanity, which is not limited to expressing negative emotions but also utilized for different usage in the sociolinguistic aspect, varying with different intonations or scenarios. These usages can be termed into four categories: integrative, aggressive, regressive, and expletive.

==== Integrative ====
Within social groups, Cantonese profanity may serve an integrative function by serving as a partial routine speech of a particular group. This intra-group norm establishes a shared linguistic code which strengthens bonds among members, and reinforces boundaries between groups. For instance, some schoolchildren may incorporate the use of Cantonese profanity in their conversations in the same age group as slang to solidify group cohesion, while refraining from utilizing such language in the presence of people from other social groups or age groups, like teachers or parents, in order to adhere to external norms and expectations to their identity as students.

==== Aggressive ====
It is a prototype usage of Cantonese profanity that is commonly used among various social groups. In situations where bad language is aggressively used, it is deliberately utilized to insult, threaten, shock, or offend others. This intentional use targets to break down social barriers temporarily and to violate someone's social integrity. For instance, verbal attacks may be used with profanity to assert power in discourse or provoke negative emotions from the recipient.

==== Regressive ====
The regressive use of Cantonese profanity is commonly seen in humor and comic contexts, serving as a form of entertainment or pleasurable regression to a childish state by comedians. It is used to add some realism elements to portrayals.

==== Expletive ====
Cantonese profanity can be used as emotional intensifiers in order to serve expletive purposes, or to emphasize certain parts of a sentence to express speakers' strong emotions, which include surprise, pain, happiness, and regret.

== Legal issues ==
In Hong Kong, there are specific by-laws that forbid the usage of profanity in public. For instance, it is not permitted to "use obscene language ... in Ocean Park", for which "an offence is liable on conviction to a fine at level 1 and to imprisonment for 1 month", while in the MTR, it was prohibited to "use any threatening, abusive, obscene or offensive language". However, despite the explicit prohibition by various laws, the exact definition of "obscene language" is not given in the ordinance.

== See also ==
- Cantonese slang
- Hong Kong Cantonese
- Mandarin Chinese profanity

== Notes and references ==
=== References ===
1. Bauer, Robert S.; Benedict, Paul K. (1997). Modern Cantonese Phonology. Berlin: Mouton de Gruyter. ISBN 3-11-014893-5. Part of Chapter 3 concerns Cantonese profanity.
2. Bolton, Kingsley; Hutton, Christopher (1997). "Bad boys and bad language: chou hau and the sociolinguistics of swearwords in Hong Kong Cantonese". In Evans, Grant; Tam, Maria (eds.). Hong Kong: the Anthropology of a Chinese Metropolis. Richmond, Surrey: Curzon. ISBN 0-7007-0601-1.
3. Pang, Chi Ming (2007). Little Dogs are too Lazy to Polish Shoes (小狗懶擦鞋): a Study of Hong Kong Profanity Culture (in Chinese). Hong Kong Subculture Publishing. ISBN 978-962-992-161-3.
