= Toe board =

Construction equipment

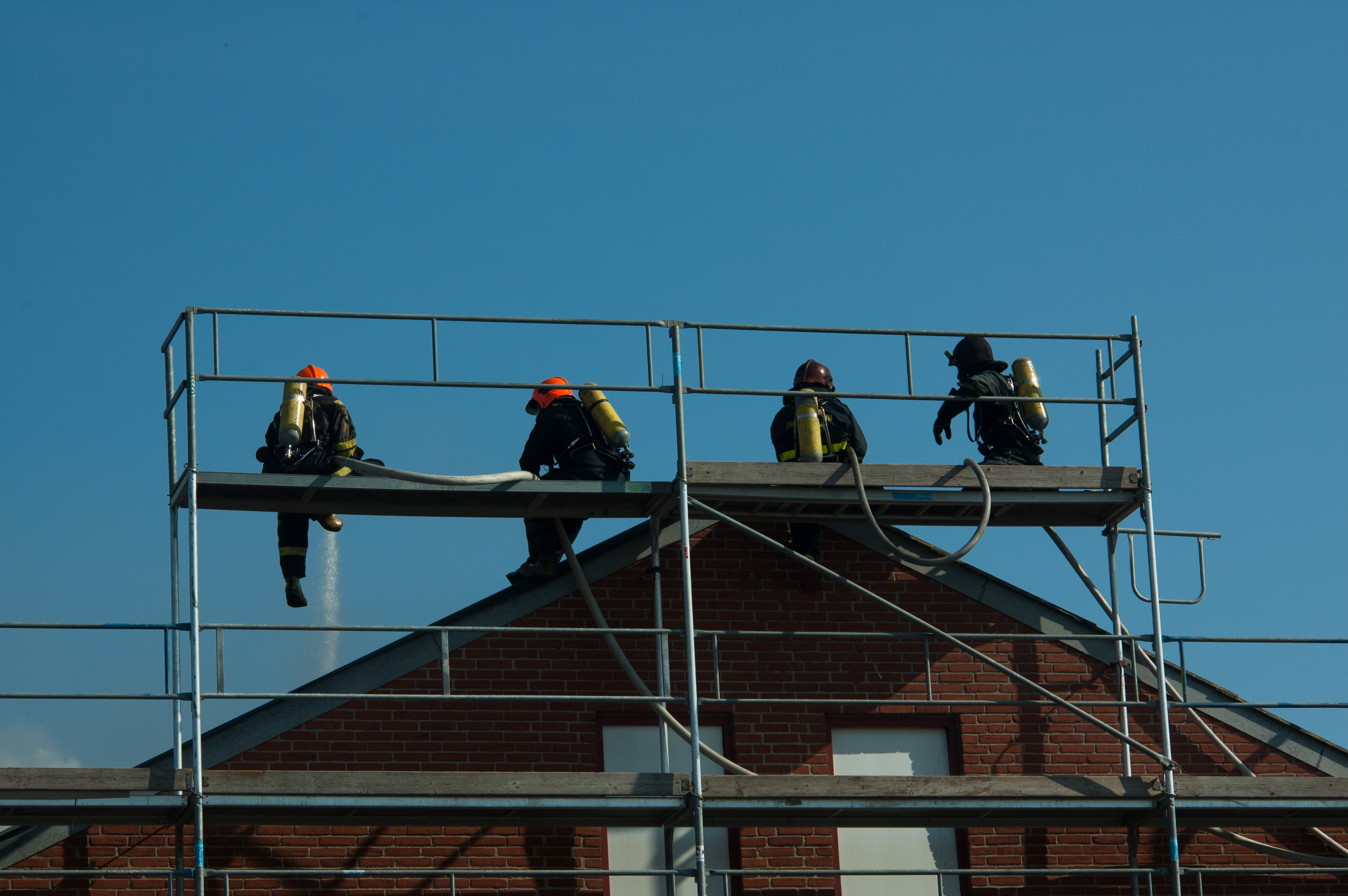
Scaffolding with wooden toe board

A roofing toe board is one of the most basic pieces of safety equipment a roofer can use. A toe board is a long piece of 2 inch x 4 inch (a 2x4) wood nailed horizontally along a roof in various places.

Most roofers work in a variety of weather conditions, sometimes severe heat, and resist wearing an apparatus such as a safety harness. As a result of needing both an uncumbered work environment and the need to stay as cool as possible, roofers prefer the toe board due to its freeness of movement. If an accident happens and a roofer loses his/her footing, the 2x4 would stop the roofer from sliding down and/or off the roof.

More deaths occur in falls than for any other reason in the construction profession.

More generally, a toe board is a small vertical barrier attached to a raised floor or raised platform. A toe board is like a tiny wall - usually between 4 and 12 inches - whose purpose is to prevent objects or people from falling over, or rolling over, the side of a raised platform, such as preventing a screwdriver dropped on the floor of elevated construction scaffolding from rolling off the side onto people or objects below.
