= Cantonese internet slang =

Slang used on the internet in Cantonese

Cantonese Internet Slang (Chinese: 廣東話網上俗語) is an informal language originating from Internet forums, chat rooms, and other social platforms. It is often adapted with self-created and out-of-tradition forms. Cantonese Internet Slang is prevalent among young Cantonese speakers and offers a reflection of the youth culture of Hong Kong.

== Advantages ==
- Save time and ease communication
- Able to type faster with shorter sentences or letters
- Helps create a sense of identity or bonding in online communities
- Becomes a medium for expressing their own ideas and an indication of memberships among Cantonese-speakers

== Disadvantages ==
- Negatively affect Hong Kong students' usage of grammar, vocabulary, and sentence structure in Chinese composition
- Students believe that it is acceptable to make serious grammatical errors and use informal Chinese vocabulary in formal writing.
- Student Chinese compositions are often filled with casual phrases and slang from Internet forums.

== Characteristics ==
- Code-switching

The Cantonese-English code-switching is the insertion of isolated English words into a Cantonese Chinese syntactic frame. It can save time by adding a shorter English word or expression into a Cantonese Chinese sentence without distorting the original meaning.

- Abbreviations

Abbreviation is the shortened form of a word used for saving time, enhancing playfulness and acting more like speech. People can share the same codes of language and thus it fosters a sense of peer-group feeling.

- Rebus Writing

Symbols or words are used to represent another word that is similar in sound, regardless of the original meaning of the symbols. In Cantonese Internet Slang, "88" is often used to represent "bye bye". The sound of "8" is borrowed to represent the word "bye".

== Categories ==
=== Puns and wordplay ===
Netizens often use words humorously as to ‘suggest two or more of its meanings or the meaning of another word similar in sound' as a play on words.

- MK: It is used to categorise some trend followers in unfashionable outfits.
- Sap buk (十卜 sap6buk1): With the meaning of "support".
- Language cancer (語癌 jyu5ngaam4): The word is used to describe someone whose words fail to express what is meant or cannot be understood. Pronunciation of the word is same as that of breasts cancer (乳癌 jyu5ngaam4) in Cantonese.

=== New expressions ===
New expressions are mostly generated from popular HK online forums such as The Golden Forum, AK Zone and Discuss.com. Members of the above forums will discuss subjects ranging from social phenomena to entertainment, sports, and gaming. Forum activists consequently create new terms for easy illustration of their topics.

- Hehe: Gay couple. It is often used to joke about two male friends who are very close as if they are gay.
- Sheshe: Lesbian couple. Similar to Hehe, it is often used to joke about two very close female friends.
- Baa Daa (巴打 baa1daa2): The term is derived from the English word "Brother" and is used to address male users in a forum, hence generate an amiable feeling within it.
- Si Daa (絲打 si1daa2): The term derived from the English word "Sister", similar to "Brother", it is a term used to address active female users in a forum.
- Male Dog (狗公 gau2gung1): It refers to people who aggressively seek love from women, in terms of physical and sexual attention. These people will love a woman without dignity and will strongly defend their loved ones when they are being attacked.
  - Dog rush (狗衝 gau2cung1): The term not only shares similar pronunciation with "male dog", but also resembles with the action of men rushing to women they are interested in.
- Gong Neoi (港女 gong2neoi5): It refers to women exhibiting several negatively viewed behaviours such as narcissism, money-mindedness and blindly worshiping foreign people or goods.
- Gun jam (觀音 gun1jam1): Originally refer to the Buddhist Bodhisattva Guanyin, the term is a negative word to describe women who use various methods to attract men to be her followers.
- Gun jam's soldiers (觀音兵 gun1jam1bing1): It refer to boys who are being absolutely obedient to their "Guanyin" and is willing to do everything for her. So in order to win "Goon yum's" heart they are ready to sacrifice their time, effort and money to please her.
- Goddess (女神 neoi5san4): Similar to "Guanyin", "Goddess" is a slightly positive word to describe women who are worshipped by many men due to their beauty, angelic character, or good behaviours. In other words, these women are known as symbols of perfection.
- Toxic boy (毒男 duk4naam6): It refers to men who are not popular with women. The term originated from Japan, initially describing single men, but gradually came to describe unpopular men within a social circle.
- Plastic (膠 gaau1): The word is used to describe people or things that is stupid or foolish.
- Wash page (洗版 sai2baan2): It refers to the spamming act on social platforms.
- Dive underwater (潛水 cim4seoi2): It is used to describe the inactive behaviour or absence of social media users.
- Above water (上水 soeng5seoi2): It refers to the act of showing up on social media ( e.g. blogs, online forums, chat rooms etc.)
- Uncover (起底 hei2dai2): It refers to doxxing, the act of digging up and exposing the identity, background, or personal information of someone online.
- Broken gag (爛gag laan6gag): It refers to unfunny jokes that will lead to awkwardness after they are told.

=== Numbers ===
Numbers are often used to substitute words of similar pronunciation for time-saving purpose.

- 88 (拜拜 baai1baai1): With the meaning of "Byebye".
- 55: With the meaning of "Yes". The word is derived from the similar pronunciation of Cantonese(唔唔 ng4ng4), with the meaning of agreeing.
- 199 (一舊舊 jat1gau6gau6): It is used to describe the unclarity and confusion of someone's language.

Swear words can also be represented by numbers for similar pronunciation, especially for those which only differ in tones. Examples are:

- 7: With the meaning of the male genital as a noun. When used as an adjective, it describes someone who is ugly and stupid.
- 9: With the meaning of the male genital as a noun, similar to 7 above. When used as an adjective, it describes someone who is either stupid or who has low moral standard.

These two numbers can be combined with a series of phrases to serve as swear words, for instance 898, which means "bye bye" and "fxxk off" at the same time.

=== Political slang ===
Political slangs are mostly obtained from certain political event and are a product of political sarcasm.

- Mr.689: Leung Chun-ying, a former Chief Executive of Hong Kong who got 689 votes in the 2012 Hong Kong Chief Executive Election. This word was used first by Raymond Wong Yuk-Man, the then legislative councilor.
- Grandma 7 (7婆 or 七婆 cat1por4, sometimes written as 柒婆): Carrie Lam, a former Chief Executive of Hong Kong who got 777 votes in the 2017 Hong Kong Chief Executive Election.
- Mr. Rubbish Bin: This refers to Mr. Lau Kong Wah, an infamous former legislative council member. He was given the name after the photo parody of his inability to speak a word during the HKFS-government conference when the Umbrella Revolution happened.
- Mr. 4PM: This refers to Mr. Hui Chun Tak, Steve, the chief superintendent of Police of the Police Public Relations Bureau. He was given the name due to his regular appearance (4:00 p.m.) in everyday police press conference in the course of the Umbrella Revolution.
- Yellow ribbon (黃絲帶 wong4si1daai3, mostly shorterned as 黃絲): It refers to people who are in a supporting stance during Umbrella Revolution or collectively, pro-democracy camp.
- Blue ribbon (藍絲帶 laam4si1daai3, mostly shorterned as 藍絲): It refers to people who support the Hong Kong Police to strictly enforce the law when Umbrella Revolution took place or collectively, pro-Beijing camp.
- Cockroach (曱甴 gaat6 zaat6): A pejorative term to describe the violent “front line” protestors in Hong Kong during the 2019–2020 social unrest.

== See also ==
- Chinese Internet Slang
- Internet Slang
- Cantonese Slang
