= Graffiti in Hong Kong =

Graffiti in Hong Kong is produced in distinguishable forms that are utilized for different reasons. The face of artist Ai Weiwei is one of the more well-known caricatures in the region. Journalists and commentators have considered the graffiti as "street-art", "creative" and the "voice of the young".

Graffiti is often a mode of expression much like other artistic outlets. It can allow artists to vent emotions as well as their opinions on the politics or society around them. Unlike other places around the world, Graffiti in Hong Kong can be used as a way of advertisement for some companies.

Similar to other countries however, graffiti is considered defacing public property and is technically an illegal act in Hong Kong. While graffiti is not prosecuted as commonly as in the United States, fines and arrest still do occur.

== Different styles of graffiti in Hong Kong ==
=== Calligraphy graffiti ===
Tsang Tsou Choi, also known as the "King of Kowloon", was the founder of Hong Kong calligraphy graffiti. His graffiti work is different from general spray painting; he used ink brushes to write words on walls instead of spray painting to express his ideas and thoughts towards society. The aesthetic value of his works of art stirred up much controversy over Hong Kong. Still, most Hong Kong citizens still pay respect and attention to his graffiti, even though he died in 2007.

=== Spray painted graffiti ===
Spray painting graffiti is one of the most popular styles adopted by graffiti artists. Hong Kong graffiti artists have a unique sense on where to do graffiti to reflect different aesthetic feelings of their works. For instance, drawing on rusty surfaces like iron walls produces a vintage feeling of the work. Drawings on uneven stone walls gives a strong dimensional sense.

=== Ai Weiwei's portrait ===
Ai Weiwei, a Chinese contemporary artist and activist, was arrested by Beijing authorities for "economic crimes" . Ai's portrait was later painted on walls facing streets in Hong Kong by a teenage girl, who attempted to raise awareness of human rights and reveal the dark side of the Chinese government. Ai's portrait was even projected on Wall of the People's Liberation Army building via laser.

== Government response ==
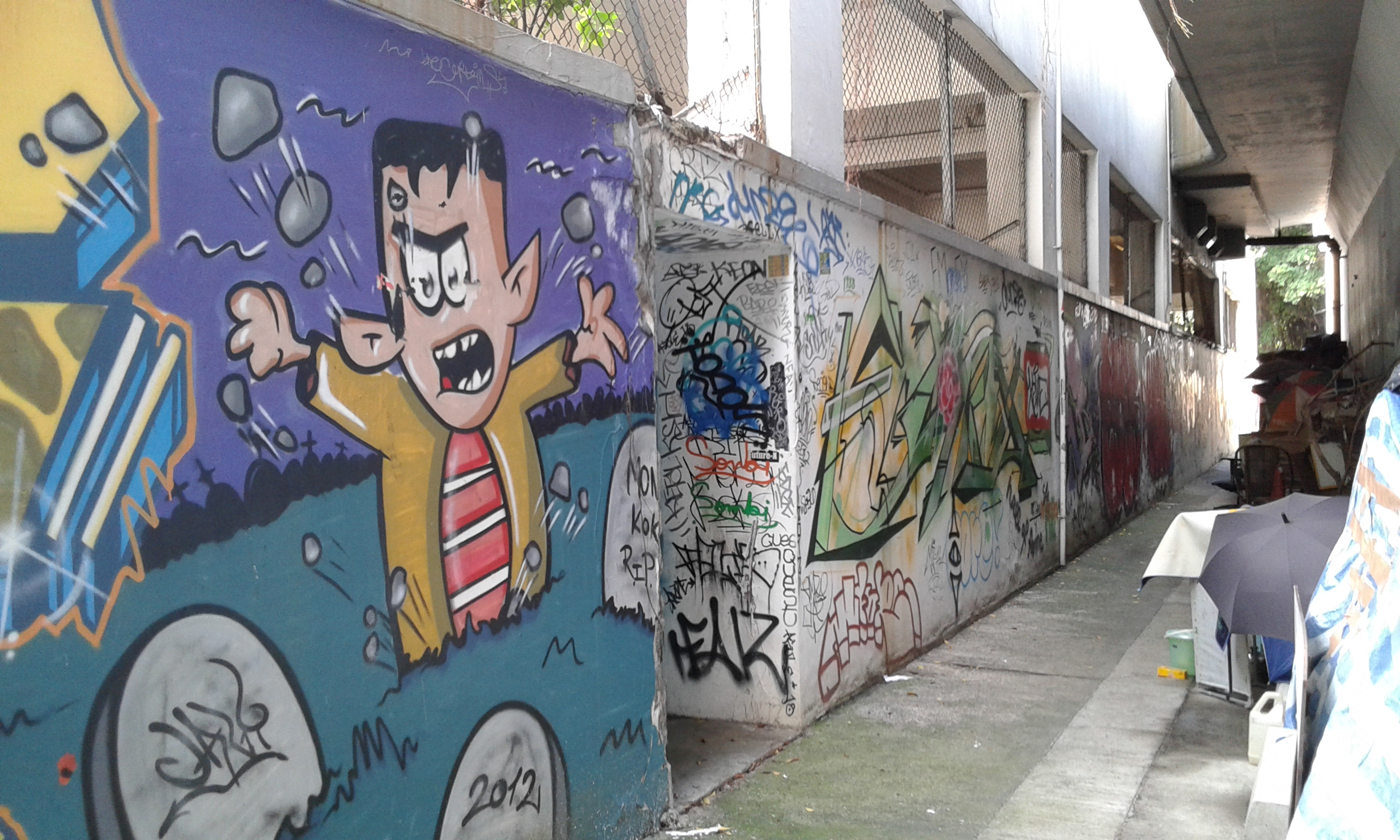
Mong Kok's Graffiti Wall of Fame in 2016.

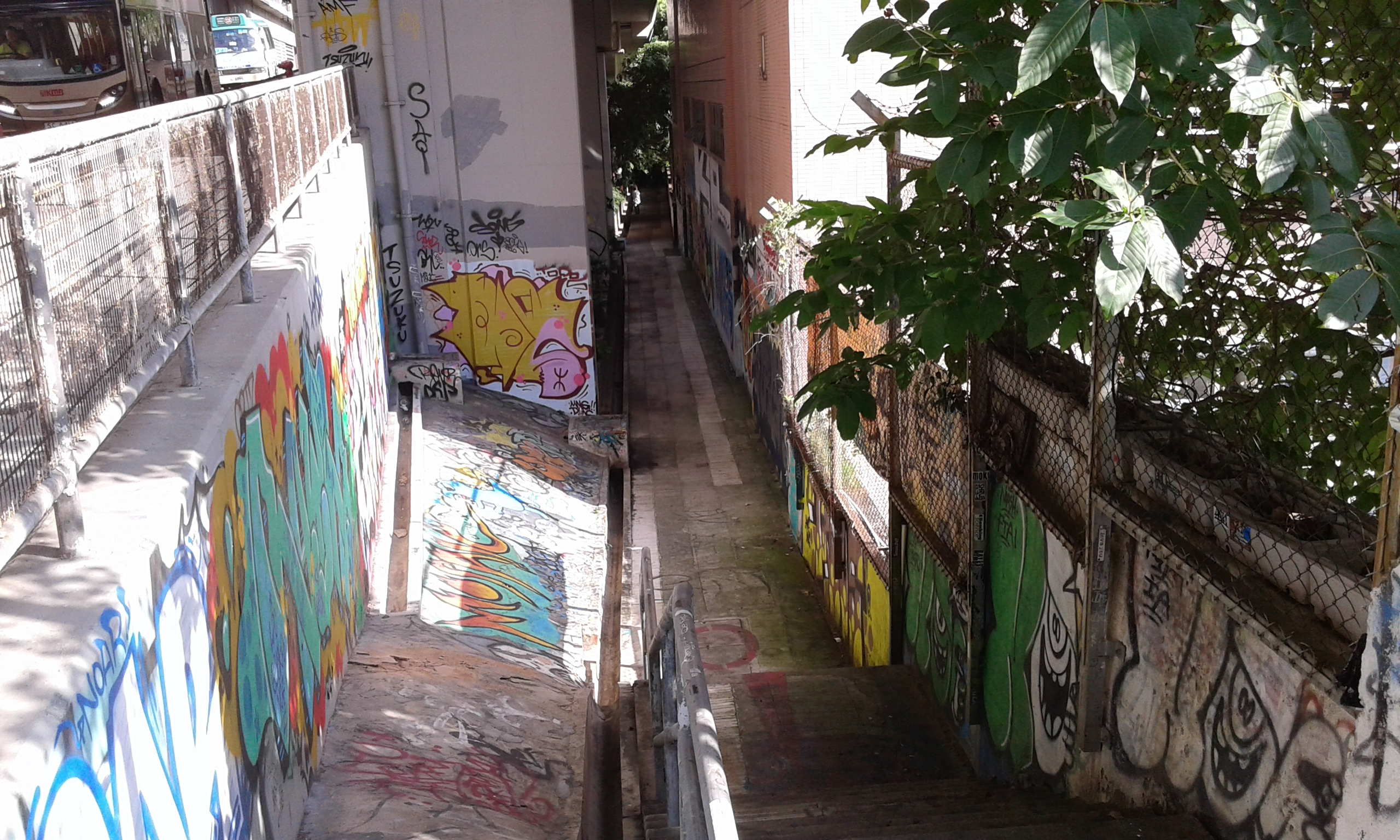
Mong Kok's Graffiti Wall of Fame in 2016.

Per basic law, modifying a public property without permission is illegal in Hong Kong. On 13 July 2009, a French graffiti artist named Zevs painted a Chanel logo on the outside wall of an Armani store in central Hong Kong. He was arrested for his illicit spray-painting and was detained in Hong Kong until August. In 2011, a painted portrait of Ai WeiWei resulted in an investigation by Hong Kong police and the Crime Investigate Detective. Invader, another famous graffiti artist, has been spreading his work in Hong Kong since 2001; he has painted at least 74 mosaic print tiles on city streets. Most of them have been removed. In 2014, a Pac-Man print in Tin Hau also produced by Invader was removed for safety reasons. Such actions have stirred up much disagreement. The public did not agree that tile mosaics on walls would cause any harm and danger to society. Some news articles and journals criticised the government for their actions towards street art. However, the government continued to take down Invader's work.

Though painting on public properties without permission is illegal, Hong Kong's government promised to preserve the painted works of King of Kowloon Tsang Tsou Choi, though most have already been cleaned away. The wall of fame in Mong Kok, in an alleyway linked to Argyle Street, provides a canvas for Hong Kong graffiti artists. The government seems to have accepted the street as a "graffiti community" even though street artists are violating the law. Paintings extend over the wall for two blocks.

== Purposes of doing graffiti in Hong Kong ==
Graffiti in Hong Kong can be divided into three aspects — as an emotional outlet, for political dissatisfaction, and as advertisement.

=== Emotional Outletting ===
Graffiti related to emotions can generally be seen in tunnels and under bridges, where the public might not easily notice. For instance, spray painted words like "free" or "heart broken" can be seen painted on walls. The reason for such placement is to provide artists with an outlet to express their personal emotions. Many people express their feelings through writing and talking. However, there are people who aren't good at oral or written communication. Instead, they are more comfortable with drawing and art. Graffiti is an illegal street art, and some people are attracted to the exciting and rebellious feeling of doing illegal things in an attempt to voice their opinions.

=== Political dissatisfaction ===
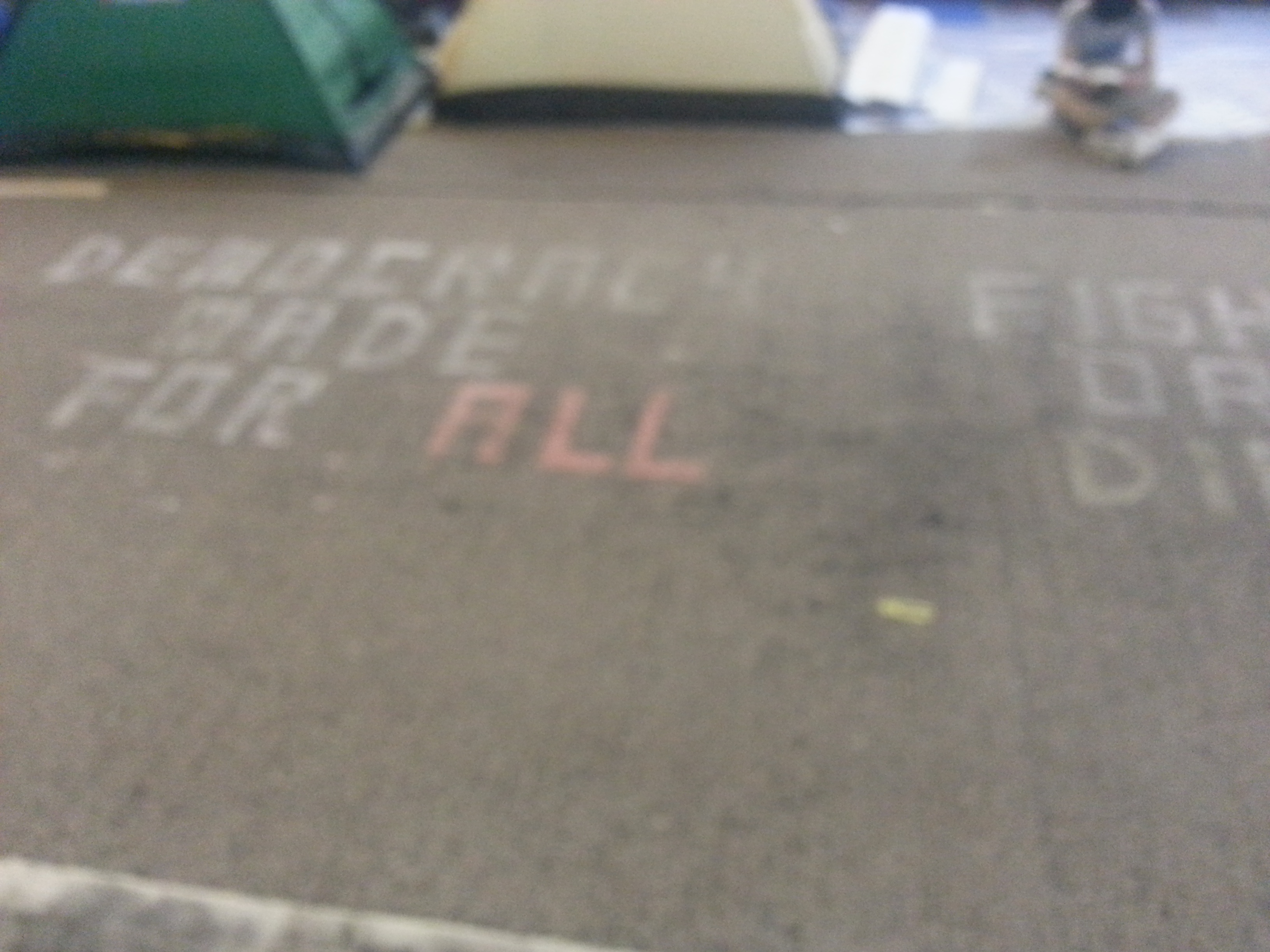
Graffiti on the road (Mong Kok, HK)

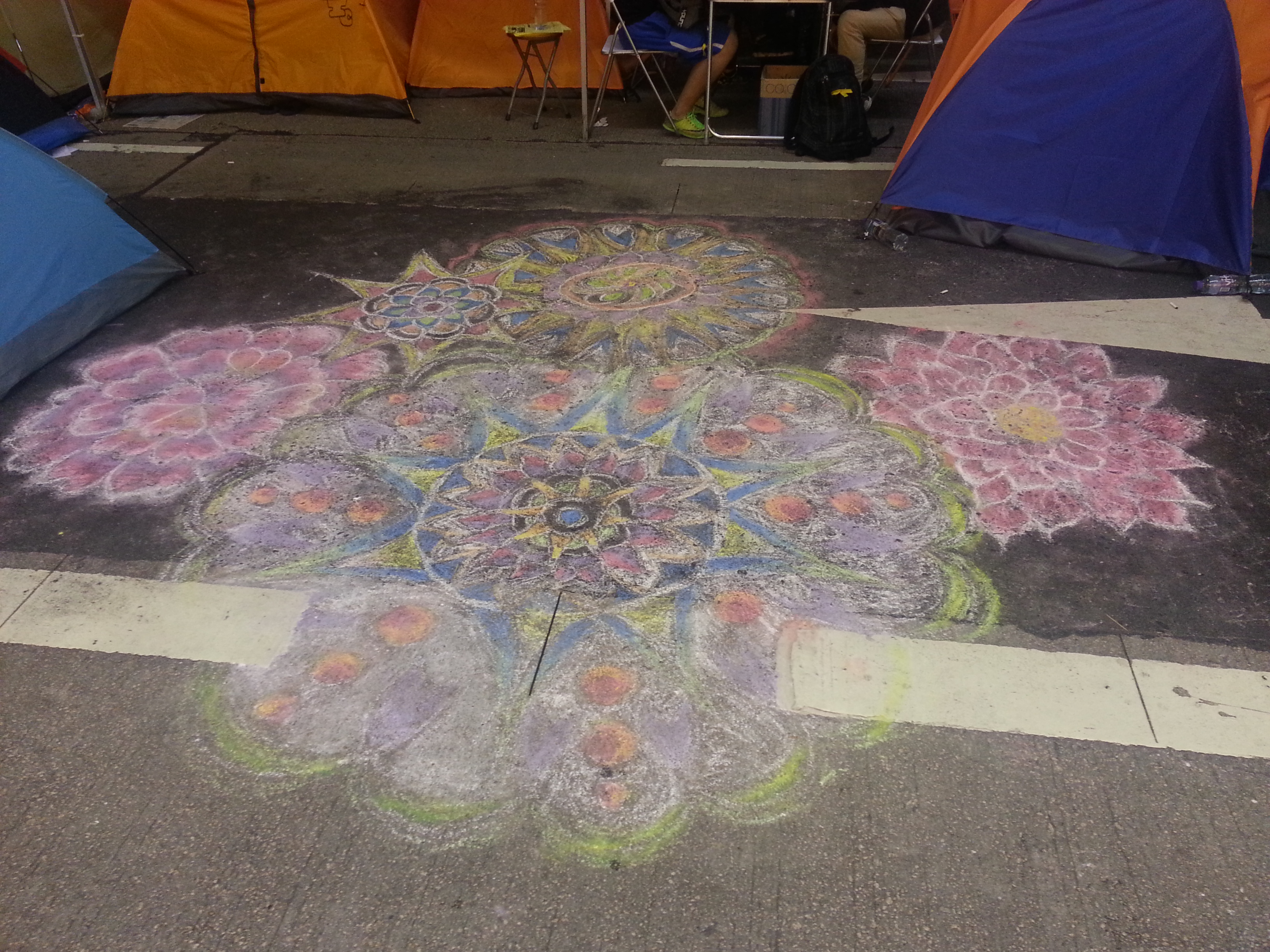
Graffiti on the road (Mong Kok, HK)

Graffiti can also be used to voice opinions and dissatisfaction towards authorities. For instance, there was graffiti related to "real universal suffrage" being drawn in Admiralty during the Occupy Central protests in 2014. Individuals voiced their anger and depression towards both the Chinese and Hong Kong governments through graffiti work. They hoped to make common cause with Hong Kong citizens through graffiti art in order to gain more support for universal suffrage. For example, protesters not only did chalk paint graffiti, but also created a mural made from thousands of Post-It notes with citizens' wishes written on each. Couplets with citizens' petitions were also hung on a footbridge.

=== Advertisement ===
Graffiti can also be used cheaply as a medium to advertise in Hong Kong. It is quite common to see advertisements spray-painted on public facilities, mailslots, transformer boxes, street signs, and so on. Company names and contact data might be written or drawn in an attempt for publication purposes. Such graffiti can be commonly seen in traditional districts such as Sham Shui Po and Kwun Tong. It is a style of graffiti unique to Hong Kong.
