= Diu (Cantonese) =

Cantonese profanity, describing sexual intercourse

The written form of diu commonly seen in Hong Kong

Diu (Chinese: 屌, Hong Kong cangjie: 𨳒 [門+小], jyutping: diu2) is a common profanity in Cantonese. It can be regarded as the Cantonese equivalent of the English word fuck.

== In classic Chinese ==
Diu is a word in the Cantonese language. It appears frequently in the text of the classic novel Water Margin, and is written as 鳥 (meaning "bird", pronounced niǎo in Mandarin and niu5 in Cantonese when used in this usual sense). It is used as an emphatic adjective with a function similar to the English "fucking", "bloody" or "god damned". For example,

武松指著蔣門神，說道：「休言你這廝鳥蠢漢！景陽岡上那隻大蟲，也只三拳兩腳，我兀自打死了！量你這個直得甚麼！快交割還他！但遲了些個，再是一頓，便一發結果了你廝！」Water Margin, Chp. 29

Diu means primarily the penis. It is written as 屌 when used in this sense, but usually as 鳥 when used as an emphatic adjective. For example,

木寸、馬户、尸巾，你道我是個「村驢屌」？Romance of the Western Chamber (西廂記), Act 5, Scene 3 (第五本第三折)

屌 has its female equivalent 屄 (pronounced bī in Mandarin and hai1 in Cantonese) in the traditional Chinese written language. In the Yuan Dynasty operas, the word, meaning penis, is sometimes written as 頹. For example,

我見了些覓前程俏女娘，見了些鐵心腸男子漢，便一生里孤眠，我也直甚頹！lan jiao (救風塵), Act 1 (第一折)

== In Hong Kong and Macau ==
The written form 𨳒 [門+小] is mainly seen in Hong Kong, although the younger generation use 屌 for example on graffiti. In Cantonese, it is used as a transitive verb meaning to copulate. In a manner similar to the English word fuck, it is also used to express dismay, disgrace, disapproval, and so on. For example, someone may shout "diu nei!" ("fuck you!" or "fuck off!") at somebody when they find that other person annoying.

"Diu nei lou mou" (屌你老母 or 𨳒你老母, "fuck your mother") is a highly offensive profanity in Cantonese when directed against a specific person instead of used as a general exclamation. In contrast to the English phrase "fuck your mother", which tells the person to go commit sexual acts with their own mother, the Cantonese expression has the implied meaning of "I fuck your mother".

The form 𨳒 is absent in the Big-5 character set on computers. The Government of Hong Kong has extended Unicode and the Big-5 character set with the Hong Kong Supplementary Character Set (HKSCS), which includes Chinese characters only used in Cantonese, including the Five Great Profanities. The government explained that the reason for these characters being included is to allow for the Hong Kong Police to record criminal suspects' statements. Consequently, these characters are now also in Unicode.

In Hong Kong Cantonese, yiu (妖), tiu (挑), siu (小), chiu (超), biu (表), and hiu (曉) are all minced oaths for diu, as they all rhyme with "iu".

== See also ==
- Cantonese profanity
- Hong Kong Cantonese
