= Department of Fine Arts, Chinese University of Hong Kong =

Hong Kong fine art school

Department of Fine Arts (CUHK)
- 中大藝術系
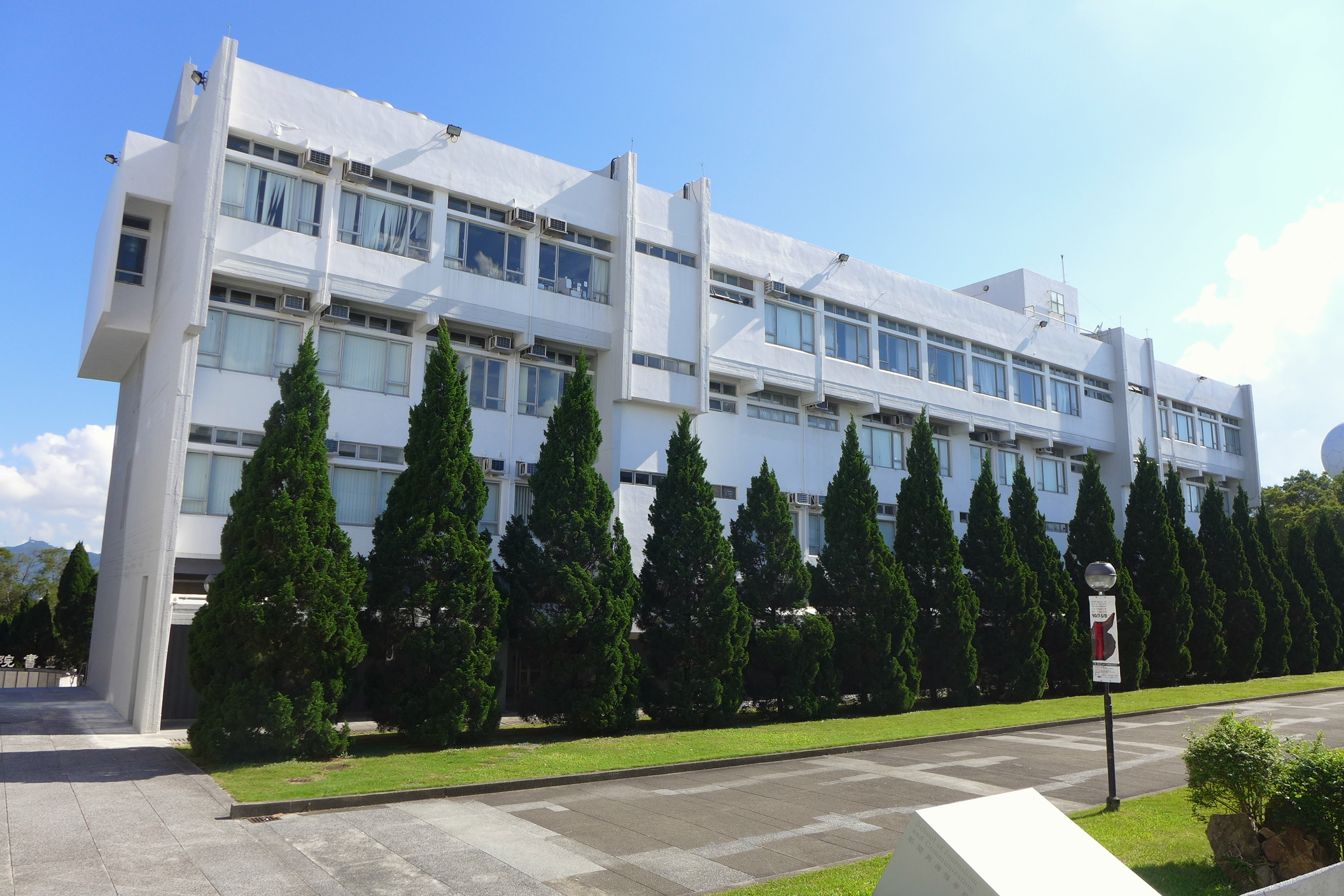
- Cheng Ming Building
- Type: Public
- Established: 1 February 1957
- Parent institution: Chinese University of Hong Kong
- Chairman: Prof. Maggie Wan
- Location: Cheng Ming Building; New Asia College; Shatin, New Territories; Hong Kong; 22.4213°N 114.2079°E
- Campus: Rural
- Website: arts.cuhk.edu.hk/~fadept

The Department of Fine Arts of the Faculty of Arts, Chinese University of Hong Kong, was founded in 1957 as part of New Asia College.

== History ==
The department was founded in 1957 within New Asia College. It initially offered a two-year study programme. One of the founding professors was Chen Shih Wen, who trained at several art schools in France and had previously taught in Shanghai.

The two-year fine arts training programme was expanded to a four-year programme in 1959. Students were required to take courses in Chinese history and literature, as the curriculum emphasized the close relationship between these subjects and Chinese art.

In 1963, the Chinese University of Hong Kong (CUHK) was founded, consisting of three existing Chinese-language post-secondary colleges, namely: New Asia College, United College, and Chung Chi College.

In 1973, New Asia College moved from Farm Road in Kowloon to its newly built campus at CUHK, where it remains today. The Cheng Ming Building was built to accommodate the college administration and the Department of Fine Arts.

The Alumni Association of the Fine Arts Department was established in 1982.

== Campus ==
The Department of Fine Arts is based in the Cheng Ming Building and Humanities Building of New Asia College, within the CUHK campus in Shatin.

== Notable people ==
=== Alumni ===
- Chow Chun Fai
- Ho Sin Tung
- Ho Siu Kee (B.A. in Fine Arts, 1989)
- Huang Yi – author
- Ko Sin Tung
- Koon Wai Bong
- Joey Leung Ka Yin
- Lai Cheuk Wah Sarah
- Jaffa Lam
- Leung Po Shan
- Phoebe Man
- Tozer Pak
- Tang Kwok-hin
- Sara Tse
- Annie Wan
- Wong Chi Hang, Sara
- Wong Wai Yin
- Wong Xiang Yi
- Clarisse Yeung
- Zunzi

=== Teaching staff ===
- Au Hoi Lam – painter
- Chan Yuk Keung
- Luke Ching Chin Wai – conceptual artist
- Liu Guosong
- Stella So – illustrator

== See also ==
- Chinese University of Hong Kong Art Museum
