= Centre for China Studies =

Centre for China Studies 中國研究中心
- Logo since 2012
- Parent institution: Faculty of Arts, CUHK
- Established: 2005 (as CEAS); 2012 (renamed as CCS)
- Focus: Sinology
- Director: Professor Carole Hoyan
- Faculty: 8 (full-time)
- Adjunct faculty: 8 (adjunct professor and part-time)
- Subsidiaries: Yale-China Chinese Language Academy
- Formerly called: Centre for East Asian Studies (until 2012)
- Address: Room 1102, 11/F, Yasumoto International Academic Park, The Chinese University of Hong Kong, Shatin
- Location: Hong Kong
- Website: Official website

Centre for China Studies
- Traditional Chinese: 中國研究中心
- Simplified Chinese: 中国研究中心
Transcriptions
Standard Mandarin
- Hanyu Pinyin: Zhōngguó Yánjiūzhōngxīn
Yue: Cantonese
- Yale Romanization: Jūng gwok yìhn gau jūng sām
- Jyutping: Zung1 gwok3 jin4 gau2 zung1 sam1

Centre for East Asian Studies
- Traditional Chinese: 東亞研究中心
- Simplified Chinese: 东亚研究中心
Transcriptions
Standard Mandarin
- Hanyu Pinyin: Dōngyà Yánjiūzhōngxīn
Yue: Cantonese
- Jyutping: dung1 aa3 jin4 gau2 zung1 sam1

The Centre for China Studies (CCS, Chinese: 中國研究中心), formerly the Centre for East Asian Studies (CEAS, 東亞研究中心), is located in The Chinese University of Hong Kong, providing interdisciplinary undergraduate and postgraduate programs in Chinese Studies taught and examined in English for students from around the world.

== History ==
The centre was established in 2005 as the Centre for East Asian Studies.

Former logo of the centre

In 2012, the centre was reorganised and renamed as the Centre for China Studies. In 2019, the centre became part of the Faculty of Arts.

In 2024, the Yale-China Chinese Language Academy (previously Yale-China Chinese Language Centre) was merged into the CCS.

== Programmes offering ==
=== Undergraduate programmes ===
- Bachelor of Arts in Chinese Studies (Code: CHES)
  - Since 2005/06 academic year
  - Restructured in 2019 (when merged into the Faculty of Arts)
- Bachelor of Arts / Bachelor of Social Science in Contemporary China Studies (Code: CCSS)
  - Transformed to BA in Chinese Studies starting from intake of 2019/20

=== Postgraduate programmes ===
The centre also has the following postgraduate programmes:

- Master of Arts in Chinese Studies
- MPhil in Chinese Studies
- PhD in Chinese Studies

=== Chinese language programmes ===
The centre offers Chinese language programmes via its Yale-China Chinese Language Academy.

== Full-time faculty ==
Below are the full-time faculty of the centre.

- Hoyan Hang-fung, Carole, Director, Professor (at the Department of Chinese Language and Literature)
- Li Chen, Associate Director, Associate Professor, Graduate Division Head of Chinese Studies
- Tim Summers, Assistant Professor, Programme Director of Master of Arts in Chinese Studies
- Zhao Xuyi, Assistant Professor
- Kristof Van den Troost, Senior Lecturer, Programme Director of Bachelor of Arts in Chinese Studies
- Gao Yunwen, Lecturer
- William Moriarty, Lecturer
- Sun Lin, Lynn, Lecturer

== Leadership ==
Name	Years in Office
Professor Hugh Baker	2005-2007
Professor Billy So	2008-2011
Professor David Faure	2011-2020
Professor Jan Kiely	2020-2023
Professor Carole Hoyan	2023-present

== Events ==
The centre has been organising China Studies seminars on a regular basis.

The centre also organised and co-organised large-scale events, including:

Event		Date	Reference
International Poet in Hong Kong		2011	
International Poetry Nights	1st	26-30 November 2009	
International Poetry Nights	2nd	10-13 November 2011	
International Conference on Historical Anthropology and Twentieth Century China		19-20 December 2016	
2019 International Symposium on "Conjuring the Socialist Rural: Locality, Economy, and Imagination of Village Life in 1950s China"		16-18 May 2019	
Policy Innovation in the Greater Bay Area: Smart Inteegration under China's "Dual Circulation" Strategy		5 November 2022	
Lecture on "The Greater Bay Area Development and China's 'Dual Circulation' Strategy: The Perspective of National Economic Security"		8 August 2023	
The Greater Bay Area (GBA) Asia-Europe Dialogue 2024		16 May 2024	
Graduate Seminar on Modern and Contemporary China	16th: Land in China, 1900-2024	4-5 January 2024	
Graduate Seminar on Modern and Contemporary China	17th: State-Business Relations in China	17-18 February 2025	
The Greater Bay Area Policy Innovation Forum		19 November 2025	
International Symposium on Asia-Europe Development	1st: Asia in Flux: Network Power, New Regionalism, and Global Development	16-18 May 2024	
International Symposium on Asia-Europe Development	2nd: China and Asian Connectivity in the Era of Global Geo-economic Fragmentation	18-20 November 2025	
