= Yale-China Chinese Language Academy =

Chinese language-learning institution in Hong Kong

Yale-China Chinese Language Academy 雅禮中國語文研習所
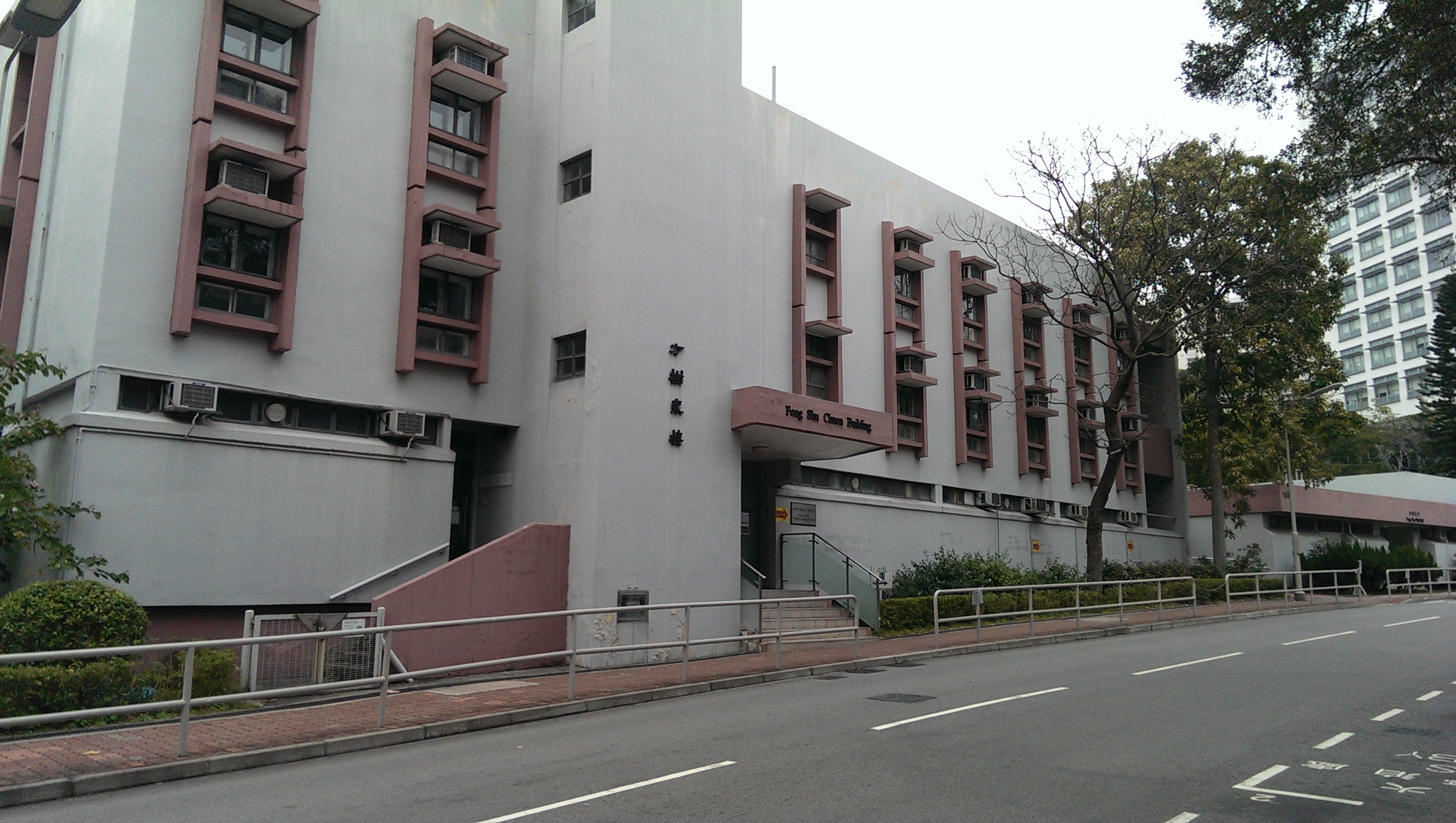
- Fong Shu Chuen Building
- Parent institution: Centre for China Studies, Faculty of Arts, CUHK
- Established: 1961; 65 years ago
- Focus: Cantonese & Mandarin language instruction
- Director: Professor Hoyan Hang-fung, Carole
- Formerly called: New Asia - Yale-in-China Chinese Language Centre (新雅中國語文研習所); Yale-China Chinese Language Centre
- Address: Fong Shu Chuen Building, The Chinese University of Hong Kong, Shatin
- Location: Hong Kong
- Website: Official website

Yale-China Chinese Language Academy
- Traditional Chinese: 雅禮中國語文研習所
Transcriptions
Yue: Cantonese
- Yale Romanization: Ngáh láih jūng gwok yuh màhn yìhn jaahp só
- Jyutping: Ngaa^{5} lai^{5} zung^{1} gwok^{3} jyu^{5} man^{4} jin^{4} zaap^{6} so^{2}

Yale-China Chinese Language Academy (CLA), formerly the New Asia - Yale-in-China Chinese Language Centre, or Yale-China Chinese Language Centre (CLC), is a Cantonese and Mandarin language study centre at The Chinese University of Hong Kong. The CLA offers small-class instruction programmes for students with various objectives. These include Cantonese and Mandarin for foreigners, Mandarin for Hong Kong people, and Cantonese for Mainland Chinese students and migrants to Hong Kong.

The CLA is headquartered at the CUHK campus in Sha Tin, New Territories, and had additional classrooms in Jordan, Kowloon from July 2017 until May 2020. Its name has changed from CLC to CLA in 2024, due to its merger with the Centre for China Studies.

== History ==
The CLA was established by Jennie Mak Ling in 1961 to teach Cantonese to foreigners. Ling studied at Diocesan Girls' School and Yale Divinity School. After returning to Hong Kong, she began teaching Chinese in her family home.

In 1963, the school received support from New Asia College and the Yale-China Association and was renamed New Asia–Yale-in-China Chinese Language Centre. It moved to New Asia in the spring of 1963 and was formally incorporated into The Chinese University of Hong Kong in 1974. The Yale-China Association (then called Yale-in-China) formed a partnership with New Asia College in Hong Kong in the early 1950s, after the victory of the communist revolution.

A new headquarters for the centre, located at the CUHK campus across the street from University station, was built at a cost of $1.5 million with the support of the Fong Shu Fook Tong Foundation. The so-named Fong Shu Chuen Building was opened on 24 January 1980 by Chief Secretary Jack Cater. This building remains the headquarters of the centre.

In 1998, the centre launched a Cantonese-language programme for Mainland Chinese students.

In August 2024, the centre was being merged and became part of the Centre for China Studies, thus was renamed as "Yale-China Chinese Language Academy", while its Chinese name remains unchanged.

== Notable alumni ==
- Lindzay Chan, dancer
- Gregory Charles Rivers, actor
- Sujan R. Chinoy, Indian diplomat
- Arthur Li, member of the Executive Council
- Christine Loh, undersecretary for the environment
- Kevin Rudd, former prime minister of Australia
