= City Vibrance =

Hong Kong art exhibition

City Vibrance 城市變奏
- Exhibition poster
- Date: March 27 – May 2, 1992
- Venue: Special Exhibition Gallery; Hong Kong Museum of Art
- Type: Art exhibition
- Patron: Urban Council
- Organised by: Hong Kong Museum of Art

City Vibrance: Recent Works in Western Media by Hong Kong Artists (Chinese: 城市變奏 : 香港藝術家西方媒介近作展) was an art exhibition held at the Hong Kong Museum of Art from 27 March to 2 May 1992. It showcased the work of a broad cross-section of contemporary Hong Kong artists using a wide range of art media.

== History ==
City Vibrance was the second special exhibition held at the then-new Hong Kong Museum of Art. It was presented by the Urban Council, which also published an exhibition book, and was organised by the curatorial staff of the art museum.

== Theme and content ==
The exhibition was curated by Gerard C.C. Tsang of the Hong Kong Museum of Art. According to Tsang, the exhibition was "an exploration of artistic sensitivity and response to the living environment in a cosmopolitan city like Hong Kong". The artists were asked to contribute works that expressed their feelings about living in Hong Kong at that time.

The featured works made use of a wide variety of so-called Western art media. The exhibition showcased paintings, sculpture, illustrations, photography, and pieces involving video stills and more experimental materials.

== Reception ==
The first special exhibition held at the new Museum of Art, which opened in 1991, was a showcase of French artwork entitled Too French. The event was criticised for being narrow in scope for an opening exhibition at an ostensibly international art gallery, and for being "too far removed from Hong Kong culture". On the other hand, City Vibrance was praised for bringing attention to the work of local artists.

Some art observers were critical of the exhibition's use of the term "Western media". The 1997 handover of Hong Kong was approaching, and it was felt that Hong Kong artists would be disadvantaged in the future if their work was presented as being derivative of Western styles and methods. Critics also accused the Museum of Art of generally taking a narrow-minded view of what constitutes "Hong Kong art", associating the term with the use of traditional Chinese methods such as ink and brush, and treating artists working in other media as being culturally transgressive.

A review in the South China Morning Post called the "City Vibrance" theme "vapid", and observed that the artists all seem to have ignored it and "did their own thing" instead.

== Exhibited artists ==
The exhibition included works by 49 Hong Kong-based artists.

- Rosamond Brown (白朗露)
- Chan Chi-ling (陳志玲)
- Gaylord Chan (陳餘生)
- Chan Wai-bong, Clement (陳偉邦)
- Chan Yuk-keung, Kurt (陳育強)
- Choi Yan-chi (蔡仞姿)
- Chu Hing-wah (朱興華)
- Chung Tai-fu (鍾大富)
- Joseph Fung (馮漢紀)
- May Fung (馮美華)
- Oscar Ho (何慶基)
- Ho Siu-kee (何兆基)
- Hon Chi-fun (韓志勳)
- Josh Hon (韓偉康)
- Kwong Yeu-ting (鄺耀鼎)
- Eric Lam (林永漢)
- Lam Woon-tong (林煥棠)
- Lam Yuk-fai (林旭輝)
- Lau Ching-ping (劉清平)
- Freeman Lau (劉小康)
- Lau Yau-kuen (劉有權)
- Terence Lee (李梓良)
- Rosanna Li (李慧嫻)
- Victor Li (李其國)
- Randi Cass Link (藍地羚)
- Yvonne Lo (盧婉雯)
- Lui Chun-kwong (呂振光)
- Antonio Mak (麥顯揚)
- Comyn Mo (毛文羽)
- Oli Nicole (童路)
- Ellen Pau (鮑藹倫)
- Sydney Pun (潘泝)
- Stella Sze (施潔玲)
- Tang Ying-chi (鄧凝姿)
- Tong Kwok-fai (唐國徽)
- Van Lau (文樓)
- Wang Hai (王亥)
- Wong Kee-chee (黃奇智)
- Wong Pui-kong (黃配江)
- Wong Shun-kit (王純杰)
- Wong Wo-bik (王禾璧)
- Yank Wong (黃仁達)
- Wu Wing-yee (胡詠儀)
- Ricky Yeung (楊秀卓)
- Yeung Tong-lung (楊東龍)
- Jackson Yu (尤紹曾)
- Danny Yung (榮念曾)
- Zhao Hai-tien (趙海天)
- Zheng Siao-ping (鄭小平)
