= Wong Xiang Yi =

Malaysian artist

Wong Xiang Yi is an artist from Malaysia, born in 1987. She graduated from the Chinese University of Hong Kong (CUHK), finishing her bachelor's degree of art in the Fine Arts Department in 2010. In 2016, she completed her master's degree of Fine Arts, majoring in Chinese Ink Painting, in Taipei National University of the Arts (TNUA).

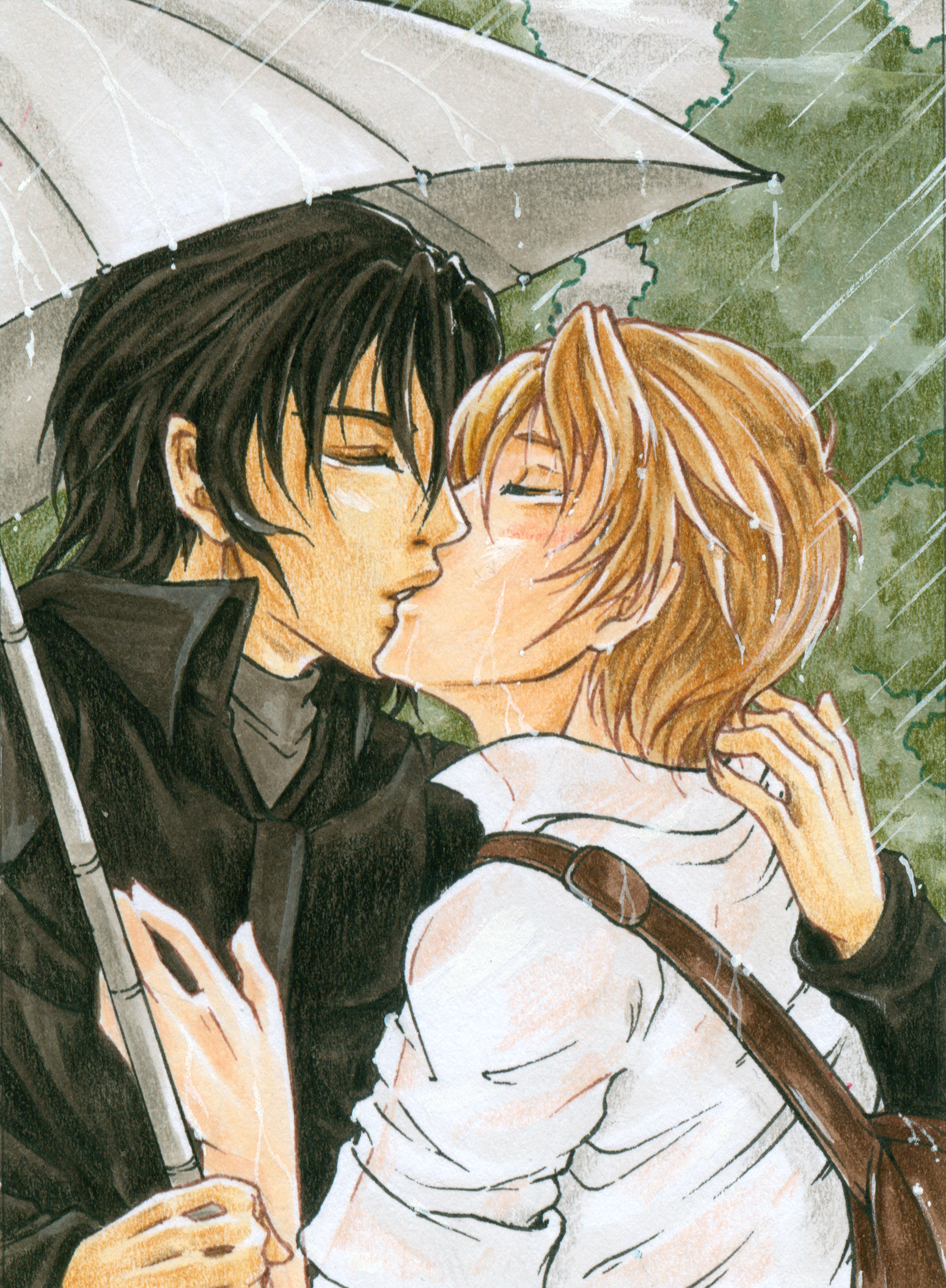
Japanese "BL" manga (YAOI)

She is notable for her artwork related to "Boy's Love" (BL). Due to the Influence by the Japanese comics "BL", Wong expresses her dissatisfaction on the current society's gender differentiation system with her brushes, showing the desire for Utopian love.

Wong's artwork are published and appreciated in numerous exhibitions, held in Hong Kong, Taipei and London respectively. With her distinctive style and perspectives, Wong also gains the recognition by the industry and wins significant awards.

== Background ==
Wong Xiang Yi was born in Malaysia but instead, she studied and grew up in Hong Kong and Taiwan. Therefore, she is deeply affected by different culture of arts from different places. In Malaysia, there are limited resources for her to know more about art. When she started her bachelor's degree in Fine Arts in Hong Kong, she earned a brand new way of understanding and exploring art due to the different culture and social value. Besides, she was able to reach the information related to Japanese popular culture, which mainly contributes to shape her value judgement.

With the support of family, Wong is determined in her art career. As a young contemporary artist, Wong has been passionate in showing her significance to the Hong Kong contemporary art, by participating in exhibitions in Hong Kong throughout the past few years.

== Style ==
Wong's creation is deeply affected by Japanese pop culture (manga), especially “Boy's Love” (which is also called YAOI in Japanese) Her works is inspired by her feminist tendencies. She takes particular offense at the notion that her current exploration of gender, sexuality and ambiguity must stem from some level of female gender related dissatisfaction. However, there is no negativity reflected in her creation. Indeed, she aims to provide neutral idea to let audience imagine and interpret in their unique way. Through Wong's creation, we can see her focus on fantasy and love (the “love-imagination”), romance and the ambiguity. She always paint boys in a soft and weak expression because she believes gender is not the main focus while human are medium of transferring emotion. For the medium that Wong used, she is good at using Gongbi as she believes it is the most suitable tool to express her feeling on the canvas. Wong mentions in her interview with the Arthongkong.net, "However, to me it is the simplest and most honest of the styles to adopt in order to present the mental state (internal emotion) of an artist." Gongbi undeniably is a painting technique that has long tradition and history, like other Chinese painting styles. Wong uses this traditional painting method, with her fabulous skills to reflect her unique contemporary thinking. This shows her significance, of reserving Gongbi, such a traditional tool of China. At the same time, her unique thinking also brings to the society a different point of view.

== Career ==
Starting to study Fine Arts in the CUHK, Wong started her path to become an artist in 2006. Throughout the 11 years of being an artist, Wong participated in a total of 23 exhibitions, in terms of solo and joint exhibition, including 3 solo exhibitions. Wong shows her active participation in the art industry since she participated in at least one exhibition every year, consecutively in 10 years since her first exhibition in 2007.

Wong has been unique in terms of artwork and perspective of romantic narrative, and her talent is recognized by the art industry. She has won numerous awards in previous years, including significant awards such as the Hong Kong Chinese Meticulous Painting Association Creative Award in 2009 and the Grotto Creation Awards (2010). Last but not least, in 2014, Wong has been one of artists on the "100 Painters of Tomorrow", written by Kurt Beers, published by Thames & Hudson, which implies the recognition and the appreciation from the international committees. The 100 Painters were chosen based on their artwork, among around 4300 applicants.

Here is a summarized table of exhibitions where her artwork were published.

Exhibition	Year	Name	Location	Additional Information
Solo	2009	ForwART	Hong Kong	
Solo	2012	P.S	Hong Kong	Grotto Fine Art Limited
Solo	2013	ze•ph•yr	Hong Kong	A-lift Gallery "Checkpoint"
Solo	2019	Casually Peeking	Malaysia	Suma Orientalis
Joint	2007	Come Come	Hong Kong	Year 1 Exhibition
Joint	2007	Two and Thirteen	Hong Kong	Year 2 Exhibition
Joint	2008	Directionalism	Hong Kong	
Joint	2008	So American	Hong Kong	
Joint	2010	Popcorn	Hong Kong	Graduation Exhibition
Joint	2010	New Trend 2010	Hong Kong	Art Commune, Cattle Depot Artist Village
Joint	2010	K9+2	Hong Kong	Local Artists Exhibition, K11
Joint	2010	Ink Art in the New Century	Hong Kong	
Joint	2011	Fotanian 2012	Hong Kong	Studio Opening Project, Fotan
Joint	2012	Flurry	Hong Kong	A-Lift Art Gallery
Joint	2012	Here I am	Hong Kong	A‧lift Gallery x Harbour City
Joint	2013	Octave	Hong Kong	A‧lift Gallery ‘PROJECT’
Joint	2013	AHAF 2013	Hong Kong	A.Lift Gallery, Mandarin Oriental Hotel
Joint	2013	Unspoken Tales: Dreams and Emotion	Hong Kong	ARTIFY GALLERY
Joint	2014	DELINEATION	London	A. Lift Gallery, Art14London
Joint	2014	Affordable Art Fair Hong Kong	Hong Kong	ARTIFY GALLERY
Joint	2015	Lifestyle Guru Haunted by Anxiety	Taipei	Master of Fine Arts, Graduation Exhibition of TNUA
Joint	2015	THE GLAMOROUS INSIGHT	Taipei	
Joint	2016	(ROOM) NO.7	Taipei	Taipei Artist Village (TAIPEI)
Joint	2016	(ROOM) NO.7	Hong Kong	Asia Contemporary Art Show
