= Kitty Ko =

Kitty Ko may refer to:

- Kitty Ko Sin Tung, a Hong Kong artist
- A character in Sidekick
