= Shirley Tse =

Hong Kong-born American contemporary artist (born 1960)

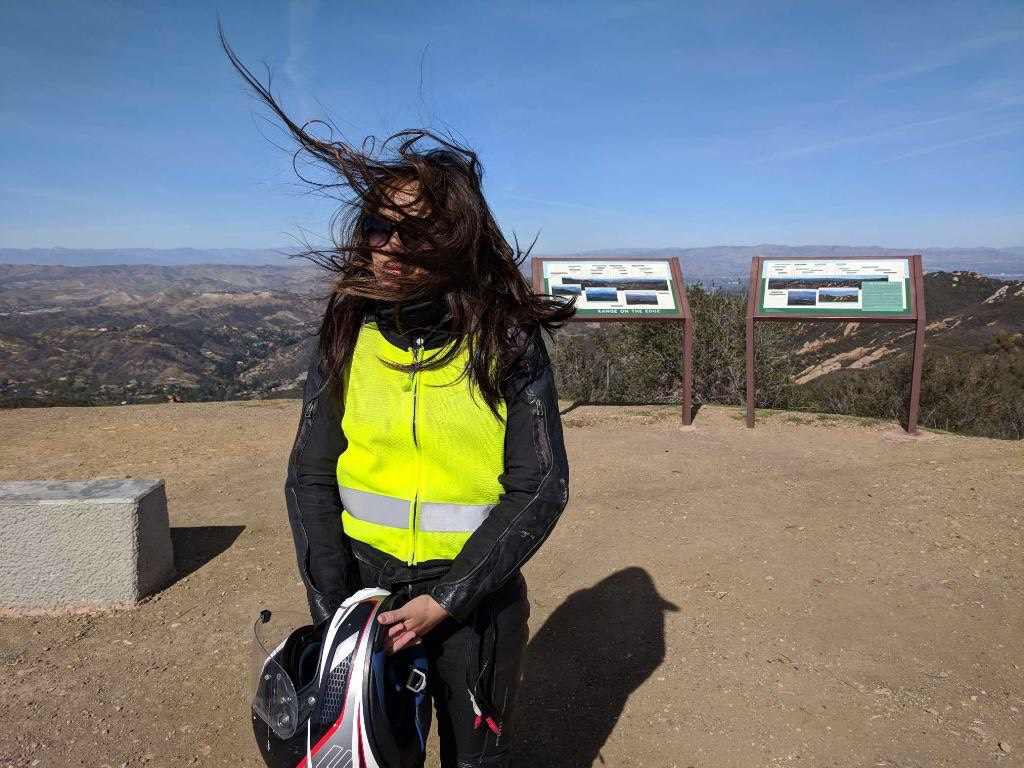
- Artist Shirley Tse, 2019
- Born: 1968 (age 57–58); Hong Kong
- Education: Art Center College of Design, Chinese University of Hong Kong
- Known for: Installation art, sculpture, photography, video
- Awards: Guggenheim Fellowship, California Community Foundation Fellowship, City of Los Angeles (COLA) Fellowship

Shirley Tse
- Traditional Chinese: 謝淑妮
- Simplified Chinese: 谢淑妮
Transcriptions
Standard Mandarin
- Hanyu Pinyin: Xiè Shūnī
Yue: Cantonese
- Jyutping: Ze6 Suk6 Nei4

Shirley Tse (Chinese: 謝淑妮) (born 1968, Hong Kong) is a U.S. contemporary artist based in California. Her art is often installation-based, employing sculpture, photography and/or video that may function as stand-alone works or in relation to one another. She explores conceptual themes including plasticity, multiplicity and multi-dimensional thinking, balancing attention to the physical attributes of raw materials, craft, form and socio-political issues such as global mobility, social negotiation and sustainability. Critic Doug Harvey wrote that Tse has "continually produc[ed] elegant and idiosyncratic artifacts that engage the audience formally, while producing a convincing mash-up of late modernist sculptural concerns and something between identity politics and autobiography."

Tse has exhibited at venues including MoMA PS1, the New Museum, M+, Institute of Contemporary Art, Boston, and San Francisco Museum of Modern Art. In 2019, she was selected to represent Hong Kong in the 58th Venice Biennale, becoming the first woman to present a solo show at the event's Hong Kong pavilion. Her work belongs to the public collections of the New Museum, M+, and Hong Kong Heritage Museum, among others, and she was awarded a Guggenheim Fellowship in 2009. She is on the faculty of the School of Art at California Institute of the Arts (CalArts).

== Early life and career ==
Tse was born in 1968 in Hong Kong, the fourth of five children in a working-class family with a history of diasporic labor. Her younger sister, Sara Tse Suk-ting, is a Hong Kong-based artist; in 2010 they had in a joint show, "Parallel Worlds," at Osage Kwun Tong in Hong Kong. Tse initially planned to study philosophy but turned to art during an education abroad program in 1990–91 at University of California, Berkeley. She completed a BA in fine arts at Chinese University of Hong Kong in 1993, before moving to Southern California to attend Art Center College of Design in Pasadena, where she earned an MFA in 1996.

By the end of her graduate studies, Tse had identified the formal and conceptual motif that would occupy her earlier career: global circulation of cheap plastic consumer goods and packaging. In her first professional decade, she had solo exhibitions at Para/Site (Hong Kong), Murray Guy (New York), Shoshana Wayne Gallery and the Wattis Institute for Contemporary Arts (both California), among others. She appeared in group shows at the Art Gallery of Ontario, Govett-Brewster Art Gallery (New Zealand), Museo d'Arte Moderna di Bologna, New Museum, SFMOMA, and Kaohsiung Museum of Fine Arts (Taiwan), as well as at the 2002 Biennale of Sydney.

Later exhibitions included solos at Shoshana Wayne (2007–22), the 58th Venice Biennale and M+, and surveys at Kettle's Yard (UK), K11 Art Foundation (Hong Kong) and the Pasadena Museum of California Art, among others. Tse has been a faculty member at CalArts since 2001, and was co-director of the Program in Art from 2011–14.

Shirley Tse, Polymathicstyrene, Hand-carved extruded polystyrene, Installation length variable with modular 18" panels, 2000.

== Work and critical reception ==
Tse's working method fuses idea, material and object, bringing diverse correspondences and differences in form, surface and association into play. Critics such as Artforum's Ralph Rugoff note in her work a "conceptual agility [and] formal inventiveness" that "collapses all kinds of seemingly contradictory elements": micro and macro, organic and industrial, machined and handmade, subject and object, natural and cultural, literal and metaphorical. Others have sometimes connected her emphasis on accretion, contingency, handwork and sprawl to the sculptors Eva Hesse and Louise Bourgeois.

In her early work (roughly 1995–2006), Tse focused on synthetic plastics as a medium, using the ubiquitous, malleable material to interweave contemporary concepts ranging from urban development and 20th-century changeability and mobility to her own bicultural identity as an Asian woman living in the United States. Her subsequent installations and exhibitions shifted to a wider range of materials and have explored the plasticity of ideas and narrative, multi-dimensional thought, social negotiation, democracy and climate.

=== Early work, 1995–2006 ===
In the latter 1990s, Tse began attracting attention for sculptures exhibited in group shows that she made of plastic grocery bags, bubble-wrap, clear packing tape and molded polystyrene packaging. Her work then was divided between such objects—often hand-crafted and staged as modular accumulations—and photographic series. In the latter work, she placed vaguely geometric constructions made from inflated plastic bags and sutured solar blankets in national-park settings and photographed them. Critics suggested the rumpled forms initially appeared comically out of place but gradually came to seem no less "natural" than the surrounding rocks, desert and sky. They further noted the reversal of the relationship between surface and structure in Tse's work, with collapsible materials determining form to generate re-readings of the art-historical legacies of minimalism) or the earthworks of Robert Smithson, for example.

Tse's first major American solo exhibitions (at the Shoshana Wayne and Murray Guy galleries in 2000) centered on the work Polymathicstyrene (1999–2000), an ice-blue, shelf-like polystyrene structure that ran, waist-high, around the perimeter of gallery spaces reaching 200 feet. It featured abstract surfaces created by laborious power routing that Doug Harvey described as elegant reliefs recalling "architectural models, elaborate micro-circuitry or Gigeresque blends of flesh and technology"; New York Times critic Ken Johnson called it "intricately sculptured … into a series of abstract topographical designs that suggest miniature land- or cityscapes, ancient and futuristic. [The] telescoping of space, time, illusion and form is exhilarating."

Shirley Tse, Sink Like a Submarine, Cast resin, found resin (factory rejected machine mounts for submarines), brass and carved jade, 81" x 36" x 20", 2006.

Tse's exhibition "Polytocous" (2002) featured what Artforum called "proliferating, self-consuming nonpaintings": minimal but painterly, 48" square wall panels of cut, excised, twisted and sutured pieces of pastel polyethylene-vinyl acetate (PEVA) that evoked surrogate skins, prosthetic devices and motherboard circuitry. With Shelf Life (2002), a platform-like structure of 20 enormous blocks of white, high-density packing foam that visitors were encouraged to climb upon, she moved to an environmental scale. Los Angeles Times critic Christopher Knight likened its abstract, micro-macro shape to "a cross between a virus and a space station, a sperm and a sperm whale" and its carved, spare surface to hieroglyphs. In the large-scale, free-standing, plastic "Power Towers" (2004), Tse made her first moves toward overt representational imagery and direct reference to ecological issues.

=== Later exhibitions and series, 2007–present ===
Tse's later work is distinguished by its shifts to organic and other non-plastic materials, legible imagery and identifiable references derived from history, literature and theory, among other sources. Her exhibition "Sink Like a Submarine" (2007) drew unexpected connections between forms, raw materials and processes associated with military weaponry, handicraft and the loom, the industrial revolution and information systems. Its sculptures—described as wry, "wonderfully wacky," and "tender and disturbing"—had indeterminate forms that evoked imagined purposes ranging from machine to shelter. The show's title assemblage bore a human heart of carved jade both cradled and caged in a small tower (made of cast replicas of recovered submarine parts) that resembled a booby-trap land mine.

Critic David Pagel described Tse's playful "Quantum Shirley Series" (2007–19) as "a cartoon-style fusion of physics, ethnicity and self-portraiture." The wide-ranging sculpture-installations have employed maps, fabric, music stands, stones, text and video in explorations of multidimensional identity and experience that drew upon quantum theory, the history of colonial trade, and both personal and Chinese diasporic stories. For example, in Platform (2010) she crumpled and sewed a world map into a mini mountain, highlighting global connections, family migration histories and the notion of multiple, parallel selves.

In her exhibition inspired by Oscar Wilde's children's tale "The Happy Prince" ("Lift Me Up So I Can See Better," 2016), Tse considered multiple perspectives, hope, sadness and the possibility of change through two quasi-figurative, interrelated groups of handcrafted sculpture. She arrayed a series of small, wire-mesh, head-like sculptures with irregular, bulbous glass "eyes" like spectators on bleachers witnessing loose enactments of the story by a set of quirky, totem-like sculptures mounted to self-fashioned stands.

Shirley Tse, Negotiated Differences, Hand-turned wood, 3d prints with wood, metal and plastic filament, Dimension variable, 2019. Collection of M+, HK.

Tse's site-responsive installation for 58th Venice Biennale, "Stakeholders" (2019)—and a significantly reworked version, "Stakes and Holders" at M+ (2020)—centered on themes of accommodation, interdependency, plurality, improvised play and contemporary life in the 21st century. She produced this work using new methods (woodturning, 3D printing), media (HAM radio) and materials, creating unexpected likenesses and configurations with varied components and ordinary objects. Negotiated Differences was a central work in the shows—a sprawling, creature-like, floor-to-ceiling sculpture of carved wood spindles and 3D-printed joints made of wood, metal and plastic filament that were slotted together like toy-building set pieces with joints made by 3D printing. Reviews described it as a marriage of difference, old and new, subtraction and addition, which served as a metaphor for cooperation, symbiosis and the entanglements and knots of daily life. Playcourt referenced Tse's childhood memories and colonial histories, exploring negotiation and reclamation through sculptures that used badminton rackets, radio antennas and "shuttlecocks" made of vanilla pods and rubber—both once colonial commodities.

After Tse relocated to Lompoc, CA during the COVID-19 pandemic, she turned more intently to the theme of sustainability, in both an ecological sense (she used no store-bought materials) and economic sense—as a conceptual choice she priced the work based on her studio rental cost, shifting the focus from commodity to the conditions necessary to make art. Her resulting exhibition, "Lompoc Stories" (2022), presented a video and nine sculptures made with materials gleaned from her new environs (which included a space base, oil field and prison) that meld the natural with the human-made: cat fur, snake skin, diatomite, fiber optics, a helmet and a basement window, among other things. She continued to focus on found materials, sustainability and the concept of "degrowth" in the sculptures and video work of her show, "Portal, Virus, Arctic" (2023).

== Recognition ==
Tse has received a John Simon Guggenheim Foundation Fellowship in 2009, fellowships from the City of Los Angeles (COLA, 2008) and California Community Foundation (2012), a Durfee Foundation grant (2001), and a commission from Capp Street Project in San Francisco in 2002. She was awarded artist residencies at the America Art Foundation Project (Vietnam), Arctic Circle Residency (Norway), Banff Center for the Arts, Linkshouse Orkney Arts (Pier Arts Centre, Scotland) and Skowhegan School of Painting and Sculpture. Tse's work belongs to the public collections of the Hong Kong Heritage Museum, M+, New Museum, RISD Museum and Vancouver Art Gallery.
