= Ju Qing =

- 居慶
- Occupation: Poet, painter
- Spouse(s): Yu Danjiu
- Children: Yu Shimei
- Parent(s): Ju Heng

Ju Qing (Chinese:居慶; fl. 1856–1865), also known by the courtesy name Yuzheng (玉徵) and the art names Yushan nüshi and Yuzheng nüshi, was a Chinese Qing Dynasty flower painter who specialized in the peony.

Ju Qing was a third-generation member of a celebrated family of flower and bird painters from Geshan, Panyu, Guangzhou. She was the eldest daughter of Ju Heng and her uncles were the painters Ju Chao and Ju Lian. Her younger sister was the poet and painter Ju Ying (Peizheng). Little biographical information is known about Ju Qing's life and her life only be dated by inscriptions from two paintings dated 1856 and 1865. Historians have identified her as the unnamed flower painter mentioned in the Unofficial History of the Qing Dynasty (Qingchao yeshi daguan, 清朝野史大觀) who became the ninth wife of Yu Dan. Her son Yu Shimei (Yu Huiruo, 1865-1915) was a calligrapher, painter, and public official.

Ju Quin painted in the style of Yun Shouping. She also employed the laborious techniques of the Geshan style favored by her family, water application (zhuangshui) and powder application (zhuangfen). The former involves adding diluted pigment and leaving it to dry to create fine watermarks and the latter involves spreading white powder to create texture. In her flower paintings, she favored the peony, a symbol of prosperity dating back to the Sui Dynasty. Her paintings of women resemble the work of Tang Yin and Fei Danxu, featuring oval faces, downcast eyes, and tiny mouths. Extant works by Ju Quin are in the collections of the Macao Museum of Art and the Chinese University of Hong Kong Art Museum.

She was also the author of The Songs of Grass from a Mild Spring Chamber (Yichun ge yincao, 宜春吟草).
