= Joey Leung Ka Yin =

Chinese contemporary gongbi artist in Hong Kong

- Born: 1976 (age 49–50)
- Education: Chinese University of Hong Kong
- Occupation: Visual artist

Chinese name
- Traditional Chinese: 梁嘉賢
- Hanyu Pinyin: Liáng Jiāxián
- Yale Romanization: Lèuhng Gāyìhn
- Jyutping: Loeng4 Gaa1-jin4

Joey Leung Ka-yin (born 1976, Hong Kong) is a contemporary gongbi artist in Hong Kong. Trained in the meticulous style of traditional Chinese fine brush painting, Leung's works combine tradition with modern subject matter. Leung's work is subjective and personal as she uses her art to comment on urban city life and its related issues in a witty and imaginative way. Leung's works reflect her strong desire to confront conventional habits and beliefs in order to present new perspective and provoke alternative interpretations of modern life.

In most of her paintings, the combination of the subject (which is often a girl), the scenery (which is usually related to nature) and the rhythmic doggerel evokes a poetic space for imagination in the viewers. The girl, which is a dominant motif, in Leung's paintings is imbued with agency to freely interact with the other objects and the environment. It is a reversal of the long-held notion of women taking a backseat and are often the objects to be looked at by men.

== Early life and education ==
Joey Leung received her Bachelor of Arts (2000) and Master of Fine Arts (2007) from the Department of Fine Arts, Chinese University of Hong Kong.

At the University, she started to pick up gongbi painting from 1998. Although this realistic technique of ancient Chinese painting is generally considered unimaginative and inexpressive, Leung imbues in it a modern spirit through her choice of subject matter, media and format.

== Style ==
If gongbi painting that often depicts birds and flowers is generally looked upon as uninspired and rooted in the nostalgic, Joey Leung has provided a new twist to it as she integrates tradition with popular culture in her works. Drawing upon her personal experiences of city life, her artworks often represent an ironic twist to mundane everyday happenings.

The juxtaposition of words and images in Leung's paintings recalls both the Chinese art form of Lianhuanhua (picture story book) popular in China in the 1920s as well as the pop art of Japanese comics (manhua) in Hong Kong prevalent in the 80s & 90s. Using the sequential structure, it provides a strong narration in her paintings whereby the viewer can derive meanings from both text and images. To comprehend Leung's paintings, it is important that viewer understands the riddle-like doggerels that she writes in Cantonese, the vernacular language to Hong Kong.

Leung also expands the art media in her painting to include Chinese ink, gouache, acrylic, pencil, colored pencil, ball pen, drawing pen and markers.

== Works ==
Leung's most recent works include Goddess of Luo River《 洛神》, Fragments of Time 《時間的碎片 》and The Listless Lion《獅子沒精神》that she completed in 2017. In her Pool of Muscle 《人間肉池》(2016), it comprises a series of three paintings titled Dream Balcony, Scenery of the Moment and Firework is Everywhere.

In 2015 Leung produced six paintings: Something that Mr. Chow didn't Mention《周公沒說》,Worrywart And The Cat with Bell《 自尋煩惱的人與掛鈴貓 》,Expired Memory: Weeping Willow And Octopus 《過期的記憶：垂柳與八爪魚 》,Transient 1 《無常她 1 》Transient 2 《無常她 2 》and Wait a Moment《等等 》.

In 2014, her works include Romantic Encounters Happen Only in Movies 《浪漫偶遇只在電影發生 》,Oil fish Melon Soup with Egg Drop 《牛油魚瓜蛋花湯 》,The Despised Monday《被嫌棄的星期一 》, Chicken Stock is Powerless to Help 《鷄汁無力救 》.

== Exhibitions ==
=== Solo exhibitions ===
Joey Leung won the prestigious Y.S. Hui Arts Award for her mixed media work in 2000 upon her graduation. In the same year, she held her first solo exhibition Idling Away a Second in Galerie Martini, Hong Kong. From 2008 to 2014, Leung held three solo exhibitions in the Grotto Fine Arts, Hong Kong and one in Aquvii Tokyo in Japan. Her exhibition Beyond Presumption 《 那些人我以為的事》(2008) is about imaginary stories presented in the first-person or third-person narrative to express her feelings about the world she lives in. Leung's paintings in Cloudy Fairy-tales《陰天的童話》(2010) were inspired by figures from famous fairy tales in the Western world like Snow White, Cinderella as a way to comment on her observations of city life and its people. This is followed by her Garden of Hesitation 《猶豫園》 (2012) and Unpoetic Poems 《不詩意詩集》 (2014) at Grotto Fine Art, Hong Kong.

=== Joint exhibitions ===
Joey Leung is active in many joint exhibitions held both in Hong Kong and overseas.

2015

- Walking In The Dreams ( Hong Kong Heritage Museum)
- Plenitude in Commonality--- Invitational Exhibition of MFA Graduates in Chinese Media of CUHK (Hui Gallery, New Asia College, CUHK)
- 〔PURPLE〕: women of mankind (One East Asia, Singapore)

2014

- She Looks Blue by Cold Ears Factory---Eastman Cheng + Joey Leung (Art Projects Gallery, Hong Kong)
- OrienTellers ( Palazzo Incontro, Rome) Exhibited digital print-out replicas

2013

- The 8th International Ink Painting Biennial of Shenzhen (Guan Shanyue Museum of Art)
- Now & Then: Contemporary Ink vs Antiquities (The Fringe Club, Hong Kong)
- New Ink - An Exhibition Of Ink Art By Post 1970 Artists From The YiQingZhai Collection ( Sotheby's Hong Kong Gallery)
- Art Basel Hong Kong ( Hong Kong Convention and Exhibition Center )
- Fete en Papier ( Harbour City, Hong Kong)
- Fotanian Open Studios 2013 (Cold Ears Factory, Hong Kong)

2012

- Connect Hong Kong Contemporary Art Exhibition and Hong Kong Cancer Fund Charity Auction. (Fine Art Asia 2012, Hong Kong Convention and Exhibition Center)
- Painting On and On (I): The Repository of Coherent Babbles(SOUTHSITE, Hong Kong)
- Desire - Sculptures and paintings by Eastman Cheng and Joey Leung Ka-yin(Goethe Institut, Hong Kong)
- Picks of the Harvest 2012 (Thinkspace Gallery, Culver City, LA, USA)
- Cracking Creamy Face ‧ Cotton Landscape - Fotanian Open Studios 2012 (Cold Ears Factory, Hong Kong)

2011

- Homeroom (Subtext Gallery, San Diego, USA)
- Vision - Hong Kong Contemporary Art Exhibition and Hong Kong Cancer Fund Charity Auction (Fine Art Asia 2011, Hong Kong Convention and Exhibition Center)
- Octopus- Nine Contemporary Artists from Hong Kong (Hanina, Tel Aviv, Israel)
- Legacy and Creations - "Ink Art vs Ink Art" (Hong Kong Museum of Art)
- HK ARTcomics 2011 (Artist Commune, Hong Kong)
- Fotanian Open Studios 2011(Cold Ears Factory, Hong Kong)

2010

- The 7th International Ink Painting Biennial of Shenzhen (Guan Shanyue Museum of Art, Shenzhen, China)
- You Are Here, I Am Not - From Ho Siu Kee to Kong Chun Hei (Osage Gallery, Hong Kong)
- The Linear Dimension - Contemporary Hong Kong Art (Grotto Fine Art, Hong Kong)
- My Humble House - An Exhibition of A New Generation (My Humble House, Taipei)
- Legacy & Creations – Ink Vs Ink Art Exhibition ( Shanghai Art Museum, Shanghai, China)
- Fotanian Open Studios 2010 (Cold Ears Factory, Hong Kong)

2009

- Shore – International Literary and Visual Art Exhibition cum Charity Sale ( Central Plaza, OC Gallery, Hong Kong)
- Ink Contemporary: ReXPERIMENT (Artist Commune, Hong Kong)
- Urban Spirituality - Contemporary Hong Kong Art (Rossi & Rossi in association with Grotto Fine Art, London)
- Liners’ Paradox (Grotto Fine Art, Hong Kong)
- Hong Kong‧Water‧Ink‧Colour – Exhibition of Chinese Paintings 2009 (Hong Kong Central Library)

2008

- The Pivotal Decade: Hong Kong Art 1997-2007 (Hong Kong Art Center)
- Fotanian:Fotan Artists Open Studios 2008 (Tone's Quarter, Hong Kong)

2007

- Ink Non Ink - joint exhibition (Artist Commue, Hong Kong)
- Think After Ink - A new interpretation of brush and ink by Hong Kong Artists (Blue Lotus Gallery, Hong Kong)
- 6 Degrees of Separation (Edge gallery, Hong Kong)
- The Pivotal Decade: Hong Kong Art 1997-2007 (Chinese Arts Centre, Manchester, UK )
- Autobiobliophiles – joint exhibition (Studio Bibliothèque, Hong Kong)
- Brushwork - Fotanian Open Studio 2007 ( Yi Liu Painting Factory, Hong Kong)

2006

- away – joint exhibition (1a space, Hong Kong)
- The Art of CUHK 06 ( Cheung Ming Building, CUHK)

2005

- City Art Trail – joint exhibition ( Soho, Hong Kong )

2001

- Hong Kong Art Month - joint exhibition (Art Scene china, Hong Kong)

2000

- Salon d'hiver iii - joint exhibition (Galerie Martini, Hong Kong)
- At the Posts - Graduate Exhibition of the Department of Fine Arts, CUHK (Art Museum, CUHK)
- Enough ． In Love – Law Man Lok, Leung Ka Yin Collaboration Exhibition (Hong Kong Art Centre)

1999

- Last 7 days - joint exhibition of mixed media (Artist Commue, Hong Kong)
- “…” Ko Siu Hong, Leung Ka Yin, Wong Chung Yan- joint exhibition ( Sir Run Run Building, CUHK)

== Publication ==
=== Book ===
2012 HONG KONG ARTISTS - 20 Portraits, Edited by Cordelia and Christoph Noe, Published by Verlag für moderne Kunst, pg122-129

=== Periodical ===
2013 Wang Ruosi, Covering Danger with Poetic Veil. Art and Design February 2013, Issue 158. pp 70–77

2011 Lai Tsz-yuen, The Logic of Sense: A Review on Joey Leung Ka-yin's Drawings. Twenty-First Century. December 2011, Issue128. pp 88–91

2008 劉浩敏，「似是而非」的現代工筆。C for Culture. September 2008, Issue5. pp 40–41

=== Collection ===
Hong Kong Museum of Art

Ashmolean Museum, Oxford University (UK)
