= Wong Wo Bik =

- Chinese: 王禾璧
Transcriptions
Standard Mandarin
- Hanyu Pinyin: Wáng Hébì
Yue: Cantonese
- Jyutping: wong4 wo4 bik3

Wong Wo Bik (Chinese: 王禾璧) is a fine arts photographer and one of the few active female photographers in Hong Kong. She is best known for her photographic documentation of buildings and architecture with historical and cultural significance in Hong Kong. Her work also involves artistic manipulations, as these photographs retell her experience and stories at the sites. In 2013, she received an award from the Hong Kong Women Excellence in the Six Arts, Hong Kong Federation of Women. Wong also has a long and active career as a curator, researcher and art educator.

== Early life ==
Born in Hong Kong, Wong Wo Bik received her Bachelor of Fine Arts in sculpture and printmaking at the Columbus College of Art and Design, Ohio, US in 1977 and Master of Fine Arts in Photography from the Tyler School of Art, Temple University, Philadelphia, US in 1979. She currently lives and works in Hong Kong.

== Life as a photographer ==
=== History and memory ===
She began her photography career in the 1980s, capturing photographs of historical architecture and landscapes in Hong Kong. Instead of preserved heritage buildings, she is interested in exploring old buildings that may be destroyed or demolished as time goes by. Her works are not just a historical record of old buildings but a reflection of her own experience "vanquishing time and space" at the site. She tries to use art as a way for her to express and shed perspective on these various destinations because she believes that the architecture she sees around the streets of Hong Kong reveals stories about the people who lived there. Through artistic fabrications, by only setting up two lights and flaw angles, she attempts to reinvent and retell these stories as well as her own subjective narrative of her experiences during her exploration at the site.

=== Directional photography ===
Wong becomes interested in the missing images after one of her friends told her that she remembers seeing a family photo taken back in the 1930s but had been lost. Photography, to her, is not an instrument of memory but also a tool for the invention of memory. At the Woman Wanted exhibition at the Hong Kong Heritage Museum, she display the photograph reconstructed by her in a way that she recruits her friends to simulate the original in the 1930s. She also create the Polaroid series to simulate crime scene in a still frame in a way that mimic thriller film.

=== Light and meaning ===
Wong has her persistent interest in spatial and temporal exchange. Her work uses light, coming in through different forms and materials and with space and non-space to symbolise transitions from the known to the unknown, especially for the photography taken during her travel journey. Viewers of the work tend to turn around the work having their focuses unknowingly shifted.

=== Advisory and education ===
Wong is also one of the founding members of Hong Kong International Photo Festival (Hong Kong Photographic Culture Association), and has been the Museum Honorary Advisor for the Leisure and Cultural Services Department since 1996.

Wong had also taught photography and communication at Hong Kong Arts Centre and multiples universities in Hong Kong, such as The University of Hong Kong, The Chinese University of Hong Kong and City University of Hong Kong, and worked as a researcher at Hong Kong Heritage Museum.

== Exhibitions ==
=== Solo exhibitions ===
- 1981: Colour Images, Hong Kong Arts Centre. Presented by the Polaroid Far East Limited, Hong Kong.
- 1985: Photography Exhibition by Wong Wo Bik, USIS American Library, Hong Kong
- 1986: Impression, Alliance Francaise de Hong Kong, Hong Kong
- 1988: Plastic Motion, a photo-installation collaborating with a dance performance aurelo, City Contemporary Dance Company’s gallery and theatre, Hong Kong
- 2009: Seized Moments: The Photographic Journey of Wong Wo Bik, Hong Kong Fringe Club (Organized by Asia One Product & Publishing Limited), Hong Kong
- 2011 Memory and Fiction, Blindspot Gallery, Hong Kong
- 2014 Not Just a Fashion Parade, Lumenvisum, Hong Kong
- 2017 City of Exchange: Liverpool/Hong Kong, Open Eye Gallery, Liverpool, UK, as part of the Liverpool International Photography Festival

=== Group exhibitions ===
- 1978: East Coast Consortium, Tyler School of Art, Temple University, USA
- 1992: City Vibrance, Hong Kong Museum of Art

== Collections ==
- Archive of Modern Conflict, London, UK
- Guangdong Museum of Art, Guangzhou, China.
- Hong Kong Heritage Museum
- Hong Kong M+ Museum

== Publications ==
- Tam, Eve; Wong Wo Bik (2009). Hong Kong/China Photographers – Volume Four – Wong Wo Bik. Asia One Product & Publishing Limited. ISBN 978-988-17998-5-2.
- Wong Wo Bik (1983). Color & Consent. Polaroid Far East (HK) Limited.
