= University of Hong Kong Faculty of Arts =

HKU Faculty of Arts
- 香港大學文學院
- Faculty of Arts General Office, Room 4.05, 4/F, Run Run Shaw Tower, Centennial Campus, The University of Hong Kong

Information
- Established: 1912
- Dean: Professor David Pomfret
- Website: http://arts.hku.hk/

The Faculty of Arts of The University of Hong Kong (Chinese: 香港大學文學院) is one of the oldest faculty of the University of Hong Kong, and is considered to be one of Asia's best Arts and Humanities faculties.

== History ==
The Faculty of Arts, along with the Faculty of Engineering and Faculty of Medicine, are one of the first Faculties of the University of Hong Kong when it was established in 1912. Professor A.E. Wrottesley-Salt, elected in September 1913, was the first Dean of Arts.

== Degrees offered ==
The Faculty comprises four Schools and three Centres:

- School of Chinese
- School of English
- School of Humanities
- School of Modern Languages and Cultures
- Centre for Applied English Studies
- Centre for the Humanities and Medicine
- Centre of Buddhist Studies,

The Faculty offers a 4-year Bachelor of Arts program, three 5-year double-degree programs: BA - BEd in Language Education - Chinese, BA - BEd in Language Education - English and BA in Literary Studies - LLB in conjunction with other faculties of the university. It also offers various research postgraduate programs, including MA, MFA, MPhil and PhD.

== Notable alumni ==
- Anson Chan, former Chief Secretary in British Hong Kong and the Hong Kong SAR government
- Regina Ip, Hong Kong Politician, Convenor of the Executive Council of Hong Kong (ExCo), former Secretary for Security of the Hong Kong SAR government
- Stephen Chan Chi-wan, Chief Advisor of Commercial Radio Hong Kong, former chief executive officer of Commercial Radio Hong Kong and former general manager of Television Broadcasts Limited (TVB).
- Edward Chen, former President of Lingnan University of Hong Kong
- Alex Law Kai-Yui, Hong Kong film director, screenwriter and producer
- Mabel Cheung, Hong Kong film director
- Eileen Chang, modern Chinese writer
- Rafael HUI Si-yan, former Chief Secretary for Administration of Hong Kong
- Sir Yuet-keung Kan, Hong Kong banker, politician and lawyer
- Li Tse-fong, Hong Kong entrepreneur and politician
- Frederick Ma Si-hang, former Secretary for Commerce and Economic Development of the Hong Kong SAR government
- Rita Lau Ng Wai-lan, former Secretary for Commerce and Economic Development of the Hong Kong SAR government
- Dr Margaret Ng Ngoi-yee, Hong Kong politician, barrister, writer and columnist
- James Wong, a Cantopop lyricist and songwriter

== Notable professors ==
- John Carroll, Associate Dean (Global) of the Faculty, author of A Concise History of Hong Kong
- Adam Jaworski, Associate Dean (Research) of the Faculty
- Yang Binbin, Associate Dean (Teaching & Learning) of the Faculty
- Wai Ting Siok, Associate Dean (Postgraduate) of the Faculty
- Song Gang, Associate Dean (Undergraduate) of the Faculty
- David Pomfret, Head of the School of Humanities
- Julia Kuehn, Head of the School of English

== See also ==
- The University of Hong Kong
- CUHK Faculty of Arts
