= Choi Yan-chi =

Hong Kong artist

Choi Yan-chi (Chinese: 蔡仞姿; pinyin: Cài Rènzī; Jyutping: coi3 jan6 zi1, born 1949) is "one of few veteran female artists in Hong Kong." She is considered one of the pioneering artists, educators, and cultural advocates in Hong Kong, introducing new art forms such as installation and performance to the local art scene. In 1985, she presented a solo exhibition titled "An Extension into Space," which is considered the first major solo exhibition of installation art in Hong Kong. She has presented her work in numerous exhibitions in Hong Kong, New York, Germany, and Canada She is the co-founder of 1aspace, one of the oldest nonprofit art spaces in Hong Kong.

== Biography ==
=== Education ===
She was born in Hong Kong in 1949, and received education in the city. She graduated in 1969 from Northcote College of Education and in 1970 from Grantham College of Education. After having her first solo show at the American Library in 1972, she attended Columbus College of Art and Design in 1973, and then the School of the Art Institute of Chicago from 1974 to 1976. She obtained MFA from the same school in 1978.

=== Career ===
Choi began teaching at Hong Kong Polytechnic Swire School of Design, the University of Hong Kong and the Chinese University of Hong Kong in 1979. She had her first participation in performance in 1980, at an experimental theatre performance by The Hong Kong Art Centre called "Journey to China"(中國旅程).

Afterwards, she participated in stage design for Parting at River Yi (易水送別), Othello (嫉) and Fu (負), before retreating from full-time teaching in 1986. She participated in an RTHK 13-week television art magazine program called 流光聚影 in 1988. Then, she resided in New York and Toronto in the 1990s, and returned to Hong Kong in 1997.

In 1998, she received fundings from Hong Kong Arts Development Council to start 1a space, a non-profit-making art space. She also resumed full-time teaching in the same year, in the Institute of Vocational Education. Afterwards, she moved to Hong Kong Baptist University.

In 2011, Choi was granted an award by the Hong Kong Secretary of Home Affairs’ Commendation Scheme.

== Selected exhibitions and curatorial work ==
=== Group exhibitions ===
Her group exhibitions include “Contemporary Hong Kong Art”, Hong Kong Biennial 雙年展, Hong Kong Museum of Art (2001); “Landscape”, HK Cultural Center (2000); “Home Affair” 家事展, HK Heritage Museum at Sam Tung Uk Gallery (1999); “Bad Rice” show 歪米展, Next Wave Festival, Melbourne, Australia (1998); “Bad Rice” show 歪米展, Damen Art Foundation, Taipei, Taiwan (1999); “Hong Kong Festival” 香港藝術節, Munich, Germany (1997); “River” 河流展︰新亞洲藝術對話在台北, Taipei. Taiwan (1997); “City at the end of time”, Vancouver, Canada (1997); “Journey to China” 中國旅程 Center for the Arts, HK University of Science and Technology (1997); City Vibrance 城市變奏, Hong Kong Museum of Art (1992); “Turn of the Decade” 轉變的年代, Hong Kong Arts Centre (1989); “Out of Context”, on a mansion on Kennedy Road organised by Hong Kong Arts Centre (1987); ”10 Years of Hong Kong Paintings”’ 香港十年繪畫展, Hong Kong Arts Center (1985); and “Into the 80's” 八十年代–香港繪畫. Hong Kong Arts Center (1984).

=== Solo exhibitions ===
Her solo exhibitions include Re-Fabrication - A Research-based Exhibition on Choi Yan-chi's 30 Years: Paths for Inter –Disciplinarity in Art (1975-2005), Para Site, Hong Kong (2006); [Re-]Vision, 1aspace, Hong Kong (2006); Red Head Gallery, Toronto, Canada (1996); Mercer Union, Toronto, Canada (1994); Haus der Kulturen der Welt, Berlin, Germany (1993); ”The First Asia-Pacific Triennial” 第一屆亞太三年展, Queensland Art Gallery, Australia (1993); Asia American Arts Center, New York (1991); “An extension into spaced” 空間內外, (the first exhibition of installation works in Hong Kong), Hong Kong Arts Centre (1985); and "From the Wall to the Floor," Hong Kong Arts Center (1979).

Her 206 retrospective exhibition was accompanied by a 332-page catalogue with the same title as the exhibition, published by Para Site.

=== Performances ===
Her performances include Melting 溶, presented by Hong Kong Goethe-Institut for Joseph Beuy’s exhibition, Hong Kong Arts Centre (1991); Object-activi-ties 東西遊戲, presented by Hong Kong Institute for the Promotion of Chinese Culture (1989); As Slow as Possible 慢之極, presented by Hong Kong Regional Council (1988); and Journey to the East, Part III 中國旅程三, presented by the Hong Kong Arts Centre (1980).

=== Curatorial work ===
She curated several exhibitions, including Tree-Man: retrospectives of Danny Yung〈樹．人〉(榮念曾回顧展), 1a Space (2003); Behind the Eyeball (2002); Paintings in Hong Kong 繪畫香港 (1998); and Beyond the Stock Market and Kungfu Movie: Hong Kong Art, an introduction in Toronto, Hong Kong Trade & Economic Office in Canada (1996).

== Grants and awards ==
The grants and awards she received in Hong Kong include “Artist of the Year”, Hong Kong Arts Development Council (1998); Visiting Artist Grant; British Council to travel England (1990); and C.I.T.I.C. Grant of Asia Cultural Council. Artist-in-residence (New York) and travel in the U.S. (1989–91).

The grants, awards, and residencies she received overseas include Visual Artist Grant, Artist-in-education, Ontario Art Council, Canada (1996); Travel Grant, Canada Council, Canada (1996); Visual Artist Grant, Artist-in-education, Ontario Art Council, Canada (1995); Visual Artist Grant, Artist-in-residence, Ontario Art Council, Canada (1994); B Grant (for artists with achievement), Canada Council, Canada (1994); Travel Grant, Canada Council, Canada (1993); Artist-in-residence, ‘Heinrich-Boll-Stiftung’ Grant, Berlin, Germany (1992); Artist-in-residence, Yellow Spring Art Institute, Penn, U.S.A. (1990); CITIC Fellowship, Artist-in-residence in New York and travel in US, Asian Cultural Council (1989–90); and Fellowship Show, the School of the Art Institute of Chicago, awarded and sponsored by the Art Institute of Chicago Museum (1976).

== Teaching ==
She was Assistant Professor at the Academy of Visual Arts, HK Baptist University (2005–); Lecturer at the Hong Kong Baptist University, Department of Music and Fine Arts (2003–05); Lecturer at the Institute of Vocational Education, Design Department (1998–2003); Part-time Lecturer at the Hong Kong University, Department of Fine Art (1984–93); Lecturer at the Hong Kong Polytechnic, Swire School of Design (1978–86).

== Work for nonprofit arts organizations ==
She served Adjudicator for the Hong Kong Art Biennial, Hong Kong Museum of Art (2003); part of Steering Group, Hong Kong Pavilion at the Venice Biennale, Hong Kong Arts Development Council (2002); Co-op member for the Hong Kong Arts Development Council, Visual Arts Section (1999); Chairperson at 1a space (1998-04); and Co-Founder and Chairperson of the Board of Directors of 1a space (1998).

== Publications ==
- 1992 “Contemporary Asia Arts Conference”, Asia Society, New York.
- 1998 “Space and Passion, the art of Hon Chi-Fun”, partially funded by Hong Kong Arts Development Council
- 2003 “Art Education and Visual Culture,” HKSEA (Society of Education in Art).
- 2006 [Re-]Fabrication: Choi Yan-chi's30 years, paths of inter-disciplinarity in art; researched and edited by Linda Chiu-han Lai, supported by Hong Kong Arts Development Council; part of the "Hong Kong Artists in the 1980s" series, Para Site Art Space.

== Participation to international programs ==
- The First Asian Pacific Triennial, Queensland Art Gallery (1993)
- “Contemporary Asia Arts Conference,” a paper presented in the first conference by Asia Society, New York (1992)
- "Global Forum on Human survival and the Arts" – an international conference on the issues of arts and environmental protection in Shimane, Japan (1992)
