= Stella So =

Hong Kong artist

- Self-portrait of the artist at work
- Born: 1977 (age 47–48)
- Occupation: Illustrator

Stella So Man-yee (Chinese: 蘇敏怡, born 1977) is a Hong Kong illustrator, comic artist and writer.

== Biography ==
So began drawing from a young age and grew up with Japanese manga such as Doraemon, Dr. Slump, Heidi, as well as the work of Hayao Miyazaki. She cites the influence of her uncles and her secondary school art teacher Mrs. Lam on her early artistic development.

In 2002, So graduated from the School of Design of the Hong Kong Polytechnic University. Her graduation piece, an animated short called Very Fantastic, won an IFVA gold award in the short film/animation category in 2002. The film explores the disappearing tong lau of Hong Kong.

So's work draws inspiration from the sights and sounds of Hong Kong, in particular traditional cityscapes and shops. She advocates an appreciation for the cultural and aesthetic value of old Hong Kong buildings and districts, as well as their connection to local history and collective memory. So visits, explores, and records areas of Hong Kong slated for redevelopment, and incorporates images of these neighbourhoods into her work in order to draw attention to their disappearance and "wake up the people to parts of life soon to be lost". So has been cited as one of several artists expressing opposition to the "ravages of corporatism" in Hong Kong.

She also authors the Old Girl (老少女) comic series. This was originally published on a weekly basis in the Ming Pao newspaper, and is a semi-autobiographical, light-hearted account of the daily life of a single woman and her cat, presented in an episodic (diary-like) format. The comic strips have been republished in several compilation books. A sculpture of the "Old Girl" character was included in the Hong Kong Avenue of Comic Stars in Kowloon Park.

So also worked as an instructor at the Department of Fine Arts at the Chinese University of Hong Kong.

== Selected works ==
- An Artist’s Impression of Hong Kong’s Intangible Cultural Heritage (2018) – series of illustrations depicting Hong Kong intangible cultural heritage. Commissioned by Leisure and Cultural Services Department and displayed inside Hong Kong International Airport on a temporary basis.
- Streets and Alleys of the Western District (2014) – public art inside HKU station. Led by So, 150 local students helped create illustrations depicting the people, culture, landmarks, and general townscape of Western District. The artwork is a digital print applied to the corridors and lift interiors of one exit of an underground station.
- Don't Want to Let Go, Eason Chan (2008) – album artwork
- 下落不明, Anthony Wong Yiu-ming (2003) – animated music video
- Very Fantastic (2002) – animated short

== Books ==
- So, Stella; Wu, Yim-chung (2016). 盂蘭的故事 (in Traditional Chinese). Hong Kong: Joint Publishing. ISBN 9789887742104.
- So, Stella (2015). 老少女之我是村姑! (in Traditional Chinese). Hong Kong: Joint Publishing. ISBN 9789620434716.
- So, Stella (2013). 老少女心事 (in Traditional Chinese). Hong Kong: Joint Publishing. ISBN 9789620432453.
- So, Stella (2009). 老少女基地 (in Traditional Chinese). Hong Kong: Joint Publishing. ISBN 9789620428135.
- So, Stella (2008). 粉末都市：消失中的香港 (in Traditional Chinese). Hong Kong: Joint Publishing. ISBN 9789620426056.
- So, Stella (2007). 好鬼棧 : 不可思議的戰前唐樓 (in Traditional Chinese). Hong Kong: Joint Publishing. ISBN 9789620426087.

== See also ==
- Hong Kong comics
