= Chow Chun Fai =

Hong Kong artist

Chow Chun Fai (Chinese: 周俊輝; born 1980) is a Hong Kong contemporary artist specialized in visual art. He is a chairman of Fotanian Artist Village in Fo Tan, in Hong Kong and one of the few artists who are actively engaged in politics. In 2012, he ran unsuccessfully for a cultural post in the Hong Kong legislative council election in the Sports, Performing Arts, Culture and Publication constituency.

== Biography ==
Chow was born in Hong Kong in 1980. He graduated from the New Asia College of the Chinese University of Hong Kong (CUHK), where he earned a BA and an MFA from the Department of Fine Arts. In 2001, his father became ill, he took on the former's taxi licence and worked as a taxi driver until 2007 in addition to his studies. During this early period, his focus turned to portraying the Hong Kong landscapes he witnessed as a taxi driver, resulting in his series of paintings "Hong Kong Taxi" (2003–2005) and "Hong Kong Street" (2004–2005) rendered in either enamel as well as oil on canvas or board.

Chow's artworks usually convey messages about politics or the current Hong Kong society. His artworks can mainly divided into several categories including "painting on movie", "Video on painting", "photo installation", "Hong Kong street", "Hong Kong Taxi", "Daily life" and "Portrait". His works have been exhibited in Hong Kong, Beijing, Shanghai, Singapore, Manchester, Munich, Salzburg, Vienna, Palermo, and Verona. Recent exhibitions include Liverpool Biennial, and Saatchi Gallery.

== Awards ==
Award	Year
Hong Kong Arts Centre 30th Anniversary Award Grand Prize	2008
the Sovereign Asian Art Prize	2008
selected as the Top Ten visual Art event in 2005, by “AMpost”	2006
Sovereign Art Prize Finalist	2006
Sovereign Art Prize Finalist	2005
Sovereign Art Prize Finalist	2004
Selected entries in the Hong Kong Art Biennial Exhibition	2003
Hui’s Fine Arts Award in Chinese Painting	2003
Ting Yen Yung Memorial Artistic Achievement Award	2003
Ramon Woon Creative Prize	2003
Gallery Ferry Competition, A Dynamic City, Two-dimensional Art Award	2003
Philippe Charriol Foundation 18TH Annual Art Competition Finalist (Painting)	2003
Philippe Charriol Foundation 18TH Annual Art Competition Finalist (Painting)	2002
Shatin Drama Festival the Best Script	1998

== Solo exhibitions ==
Year	Title	Place'
2016	CHOW Chun Fai: Everything Comes With an Expiry Date	Klein Sun Gallery, New York
2015	CHOW Chun Fai: I Have Nothing to Say	Hanart, Hong Kong
2013	CHOW Chun Fai: I Have Something to Say	Hanart, Hong Kong
2009	Reproduction of Reproduction	Hanart, Hong Kong
2009	Not Fine Art	Hanart, Hong Kong
2008	Shanghai Tan	Galleria dell"Arco, Moganchan, Shanghai
2008	VIENNAFAIR-Paintings by CHOW Chun Fai	Vienna
2008	China International Gallery Exposition	Beijing
2008	Paintings, Videos and Photography by Chow Chun Fai	Hanart, Hong Kong
2005	Significance Form: Paintings by Chow Chun Fai	GrottoFineart, Hong Kong
2004	Paintings by Chow Chun Fai	State of Arts Gallery, Hong Kong
2003	Painting, Grass, Ceiling	Hong Kong Art Centre

== Group exhibitions ==
Date	Title	Place
2016	Chinese Whispers	Zentrum Paul Klee, Bern, Switzerland
2013	A Better Tomorrow	Beijing
2013/05	Art Basel	Hong Kong
2013/05/08	Painting On and On	Lingnan University of Hong Kong
2013/03	Cultural Rights – Artist Running An Election	The Hong Kong University of Science and Technology
2013/1	Fotanian: Fotan Artists Open Studios 2013	Fotan, Hong Kong
2012	Hong Kong Eye	Saarchi Gallery London
2012/9	All Are Guests - Liverpool Biennial	Liverpool, England
2011/1	Fotanian: Fotan Artists Open Studios 2011	Fotan, Hong Kong
2010/9/19	Lui Chun Kwong. You Are Here, I Am Not. From Ho Siu Kee to Kong Chun Hei	Osage Gallary, Kwun Tong, Hong Kong
2010/9	Fungshui Sculpture and Installation	Woofer Ten, 404 Shanghai Street, Hong Kong
2009/7	Not-Fine-Art: Chow Chun Fai	Hanart TZ Gallery, Hong Kong
2008/12	Hong Kong, Hong Kong	Hanart TZ Gallery, Hong Kong
2008/10	Effettp Stalker #2	Galleria Dell'Arco, Palermo, Italy
2007	The Pivotal Decade	Chinese Art Centre, Manchester, UK
