= Ho Sin Tung =

Hong Kong visual artist (born 1986)

Ho Sin Tung (Chinese: 何倩彤; born 1986) is a visual artist who lives and works in Hong Kong.

== Background ==
Ho was born and raised in Hong Kong, and grew up in Tai Po before moving further north near Lok Ma Chau. Ho began her artistic training at the age of three when she attended workshops in a studio called "Cultural Corner" founded by a Hong Kong painter, Gaylord Chan (陳餘生). She graduated from the Salem-immanuel Lutheran College in 2005, and graduated with a Bachelor of Fine Arts from the Fine Arts Department of The Chinese University of Hong Kong in 2008. Ho participated in SeMA Mediacity Biennale Seoul (2014) and the 9th Shanghai Biennale (2012), and received Hong Kong Arts Development Award 2012 – Award for Young Artist and Hong Kong Contemporary Art Award 2012. Ho is now a full-time artist and operates a studio in Fo Tan.

Ho's work is multidisciplinary and cross-media. She uses a variety of texts and materials and weaves impressions of varied objects, stories, movies, as well as personal memories and imaginations into various forms of representations. She may use pencil, graphite and watercolour as art media in combination with found and ready-made images such as stickers, maps, charts, and rubber-stamps to create artwork. She also creates video art and process-led projects that interpret and extend different narrative frameworks.

Apart from drawing, installation and video, Ho also considers writing as one of her essential practices. Ho's translations, reviews and fictions are published in various medias and literal magazines. Ho enjoys reading a lot and spends most of her time in a day reading.

Ho is inspired by the cinema, martial arts, literature and film culture. These are all sources of inspiration for her artistic creations. Ho is obsessed with films, with a particular interest in European movies, for Ho enjoys the depth and darkness depicted in movies. Ho believes that films are more than an escape to her, films teach her about emotions and actions that are larger than life. Drawn to horror scenarios, Ho believes in ghosts and expresses some of her deep fears in her drawings. Her depiction and artwork of human bodies are often at the edge of reality and surreal, reflecting her fantasies, pains and obsessions.

Ho respects non-living items, storiese and knowledge as if they are living animals or humans. She believes non-living items should be easily categorised or defined^{.}

Ho currently operates a gym-cultural space called Good Night which serves as a platform for interdisciplinary practice, leveraging the power of sports to train and empower practitioners as stronger individuals and communities.

Ho is represented by Hanart TZ Gallery in Hong Kong and Chambers Fine Art in New York and Beijing.

== Artist residencies ==
- Living in Creative Fongshan, Kaohsiung, Taiwan (Oct 2016)
- Vermont Studio Centre, Johnson, Vermont, US (Oct – Nov 2013)
- SeMA Nanji Residency, Seoul Museum of Art, Seoul, South Korea (Jul – Sep 2013)

== Exhibitions ==
=== Selected solo exhibitions ===
- 2017 – Maybe They Will Die For Us Tomorrow, Oil Street Art Space, Hong Kong
- 2017 – Surfaced, Chambers Fine Art, New York, US
- 2016 – Dusty Landscape, Chambers Fine Art, Beijing, China
- 2015 – Icarus Shrugged, Hanart TZ Gallery, Hong Kong
- 2013 – The Void of Course Monday, Para Site, Art Basel Hong Kong
- 2012 – Hong Kong Inter-vivos Film Festival, Hanart TZ Gallery, Hong Kong
- 2011 – You Are Running A Business Called None of My Business, Abu Dhabi Art Fair, Abu Dhabi, UAE
- 2011 – Folie à deux, Experimenta, Hong Kong
- 2010 – Don't shoot the messenger, Hanart TZ Gallery, Hong Kong

=== Selected group exhibitions ===
- 2019 – Shek O-Sublime, Gallery EXIT, Hong Kong
- 2018 – The D-Tale, Video Art from the Pearl River Delta, Times Art Center, Berlin, Germany
- 2018 – How To See [What Isn't There], Langen Foundation, Neuss, Germany
- 2018 – Wan Chai Grammatica: Past, Present, Future Tense, Pao Galleries, Hong Kong Arts Centre, Hong Kong
- 2018 – Women in Art: Hong Kong, Sotheby's Hong Kong Gallery, Hong Kong
- 2017 – CUHK Fine Arts Department 60th Anniversary Feature Exhibition, Cattle Depot, Hong Kong
- 2017 – Ambiguously Yours: Gender in Hong Kong Popular Culture, M+ Pavilion, West Kowloon Cultural District, Hong Kong
- 2016 – Living in Creative Fongshan, C9-15 Dayi Area, Pier-2 Art Center, Kaohsiung, Taiwan
- 2016 – Animamix Biennale: Space in Mind, MoCA Shanghai, Shanghai, China
- 2016 – The (non) Existing Memory of Hong Kong in Literary Text, Comix Home Base, Hong Kong
- 2016 – Next Destination: Hong Kong, Exhibition of William Lim's Living Collection, Sotheby's Hong Kong Gallery, Hong Kong
- 2015 – The Human Body: Measure and Norms, Blindspot Gallery, Hong Kong
- 2015 – A Journey of Innovation, Hong Kong Convention and Exhibition Centre, Hong Kong
- 2015 – Polyphony III – Ecological Survey of Chinese Art – Pearl River Delta, Hall 3 of Art Museum of Nanjing University of the Arts, Nanjing, China
- 2015 – Here Is Where We Meet, Duddell's, Hong Kong
- 2015 – After/Image, Studio 52, Pure Art Foundation, Hong Kong
- 2015 – Sovereign Asian Art Prize Finalists' Exhibition, SOHO189 Art Lane / Level 18, Hong Kong
- 2014 – SeMA Biennale Mediacity Seoul 2014: Ghosts, Spies and Grandmothers, Seoul Museum of Art, Seoul, Korea; Korean Film Archive, Seoul, Korea
- 2014 – The Part In The Story Where A Part Becomes A Part Of Something Else, Witte de With, Rotterdam, The Netherlands
- 2014 – Animamix Biennale 2013–14: This Slow.That Fast, Run Run Shaw Creative Media Centre, City University of Hong Kong, Hong Kong
- 2013 – Hong Kong Contemporary Art Award 2012, Hong Kong Museum of Art, Hong Kong
- 2013 – Framed: Ai Wei Wei and Hong Kong Artists, Duddell's, Hong Kong
- 2013 – HETEROTOPIA, SeMA Nanji Exhibition Hall, Seoul, Korea
- 2013 – The Floating Eternity, Para Site, Hong Kong
- 2013 – Drawing: Expression and Limit, Hall 2 of Art Museum of Nanjing University of the Arts, Nanjing, China
- 2013 – The Rencontres Internationales Paris/Berlin/Madrid, Haus der Kulturen der Welt, Berlin, Germany
- 2013 – Hong Kong Eye, ArtisTree, Hong Kong
- 2012 – The Rencontres Internationales Paris/Berlin/Madrid, Palais de Tokyo, Paris, France
- 2012 – Hong Kong Eye, Saatchi Gallery, London, UK
- 2012 – The 9th Shanghai Biennale: Reactivation, Shanghai Museum of Contemporary Art, Shanghai, China
- 2012 – The Repository of Coherent Babbles, Southsite, Hong Kong
- 2012 – CAFAM.FUTURE, China Central Academy of Fine Arts Museum, Beijing, China
- 2012 – 'Traits, Ox Warehouse 2nd floor showroom, Macau
- 2012 – Market Force, Osage Kwun Tong, Hong Kong
- 2012 – The 17th Hong Kong Independent Short Film & Video Awards, Hong Kong Space Museum, Hong Kong
- 2011 – Octopus, Hanina Contemporary Art, Tel Aviv, Israel
- 2011 – Urban Utopia: if and only if, Goethe Institute, Hong Kong
- 2011 – Societe Generale Chinese Art Awards 2010 Tour Exhibition, Hong Kong / Beijing / Shanghai / Taipei / Paris / Singapore / London
- 2010 – You're Here, I'm Not., Osage Gallery, Kwun Tong, Hong Kong
- 2010 – Drawing Out Conversations: Taipei, Nanhai Gallery, Taipei, Taiwan
- 2010 – Shifting Topography, Hanart Square, Hong Kong
- 2010 – The Hong Kong Contemporary Art Biennial Awards 2009, Hong Kong Museum of Art, Hong Kong
- 2010 – Labium, Gallery EXIT, Hong Kong
- 2009 – A place changes when we look, agnes b's Librairie Galerie, Hong Kong
- 2009 – Fresh, Amelia Johnson Contemporary, Hong Kong
- 2009 – Drawing Out Conversations: Hong Kong Leg, Studio Bibliothèque, Fotan Artists Open Studios 2009, Fotan, Hong Kong
- 2008 – Hong Kong, Hong Kong, Hanart TZ Gallery, Hong Kong

== Selected awards ==
- 2015 – Finalist of Sovereign Asian Art Prize, Sovereign Art Foundation
- 2013 – Finalist of Lu Xun Culture Award - Award for Best Artwork, Soho.com and Lu Xun Culture Foundation
- 2012 – Hong Kong Arts Development Award 2012 - Award for Young Artist, Hong Kong Arts Development Council
- 2012 – Hong Kong Contemporary Art Award 2012, Hong Kong Museum of Art
- 2010 – Finalist of Societe Generale Chinese Art Awards 2010, Societe Generale
- 2009 – Finalist of Hong Kong Contemporary Art Biennial Awards 2009, Hong Kong Museum of Art
- 2008 – Hui Yeung Sing Fine Arts Award, Chinese University of Hong Kong
- 2007 – Cheung's Fine Arts Awards, Chinese University of Hong Kong
- 2006 – Gaylord Chan Painting Award, Chinese University of Hong Kong
- 2006 – Lui Lup-fun Creative Award, Chinese University of Hong Kong
