= Leung Po Shan =

Hong Kong artist

- Born: 1974 (age 51–52); Hong Kong
- Education: Department of Fine Arts, CUHK; MA in History of Art, University of Leeds, UK; Ph.D. in Cultural Studies, CUHK
- Known for: Performance art; Installation art; Art criticism
- Notable work: Women and Blood Series (1993–1995); Love the Fucking Country (1997, 2000); Ten Steps One Kneel to Xin Ya (1996, 2003, 2005)

Leung Po Shan (Anthony, Chinese: 梁寶珊, pen name: 梁寶山) is a Hong Kong artist specialized in installation and performance art. She worked as curator, editor and art critic. She was born 1974 in Hong Kong. Leung graduated from the Chinese University of Hong Kong, majoring in Fine Arts and pursued a Masters of Philosophy degree there. She studied at the University of Leeds on a Hong Kong Arts Development Council Scholarship. Playing with images, texts and body in theater, performance and installation, she has been involved in many major exhibitions, both locally and internationally.

== Education ==
During her adolescence, Leung studied at St. Catharine's School for Girls. She recalled that the headmistress encouraged students to be independent, although they turned out to be rude and casual. This open and free environment influenced her.

While studying Fine Arts she was inspired and supported by guest professor Wu Mali (吳瑪悧) from Taiwan to make her first formal performance artwork: Series of Women and Blood, No.1,1993. Other artists inspired her including 侯俊明 and 楊秀卓.

After pursuing a M.Phil. degree at the CUHK on History of Chinese Art, she was awarded a scholarship from the Arts Development Council and gained an M.A. in History of Art at the Leeds University. In 2005, she started another master's degree in Cultural studies at the Lingnan University.

In 2011, she suspended writing art criticism and creating works. She went back to CUHK, aiming for a Ph.D. degree in culture studies. She has completed the thesis on art labour in 2017.

== Work and experience ==
She was involved in the experimental theater group '20 Beans Show'. Her major works include, 'Love the Fucking Country' (1997 Hong Kong Cultural Festival, Munich)(2000 Jazz Club, Macau), 'The Sun Never Goes Down on the British Empire'(1999 Perth, Australia 1999), 'The Devotion I' (also known as the Flower Inscription) (2001 Para/Site Art Space; Gwanju Biennial 2002), 'Empty Jacket (9 +/-)' (adaptation of Jean Genet Balcony, collaboration with Steve Pang, 2001 Hong Kong Arts Center and The Old Ladies House, Macau), and transformation double (20 Beans + A Box Production, Inspired by Double Body and Metamorphosis, 2003 Hong Kong Arts Center), On-on-One Solo Installation + Performance (2002/03, On&On Theater Workshop/ Girl Plays Women Art Festival), Spiderwoman (2004, Cruel/Loving Bodies, Dolun Modern Art Museum, Shanghai).

Her project, 'Shadow-in-time', is a meditative long-duration performance and installation in various sites, encompassing embodiment and disembodiment. She was the 'Breathe' resident-artist at the Chinese Art Center 2007 and participated in the 'Vital: Chinese Live Art Festival'.

She joined Para/Site Art Space in 1998, later becoming its General Manager of Para/Site Art Space and the Chief Editor of PS magazine. Her art criticism has been published in Hong Kong Economic Journal and Ming Pao Daily. Her most recent publication is From Transition to Handover: An Anthology of Seven Visual Critics (Co-edited with Edwin Lai Kin Keung). Leung was researcher/curator of the exhibition, 'The Red Twenty Years of Ricky Yeung Sau-churk', the second exhibition of Hong Kong Artists in the 1980s series presented by Para/Site.

Leung joined the Inmedia(Hong Kong) in 2004 and served as an editorial member till 2011. She was then actively involved in the Factory Artist Concern Group and assisted artist Chow Chun Fai to run for the Legislative Council election in 2012. Following this, she went on to found Hong Kong Culture Monitor, another pressure group that concerns about cultural policy in Hong Kong. She is also a member of the Art Appraisal Club, an art critic collective.

=== Publications ===
- PS visual arts and culture magazine, editor, issue no.14 (Spring 2001) to 16(Winter 2002); issue no.7(May 1999)to no.13(Feb 2001)
- Para/Site 1996-2000, editor, Hong Kong: Para/Site Art Space, May 2002.
- From Transition to Millinieum: an anthology of art criticism, Co-editor with Lai Kin Keung, Hong Kong: Hong Kong Arts Center, 2001.
- The Red Twenty-years of Ricky Yeung Sau-churk, author and editor, Hong Kong:Para/Site Art Space, December 2002.
- QK-Specimen Collection of Chan Yuk Keung, author and editor, Hong Kong: Para/Site Art Space, August 2003.
- Fotanian 2004: Open Studio, author and editor, Hong Kong: Fotanian, 2004.
- Pak Sheung Chuen, "Visual/Textual City" series: See What Walk of 1 July & Odd One In: Hong Kong Diary, editor and curator, Hong Kong: Artopia & 70+arts/words, 2005
- 活在平常, author, Hong Kong: Kubrick Press, 2012
- 我愛Art Basel: 論盡藝術與資本, author, Dirty Press, 2018.

== Installations and performance art ==
=== Series of Women and Blood, No.1—1993 ===
Leung's first formal performance was a collaboration with her college classmate Wong Yuen Shan. The two women wore white dresses, carrying huge plastic bags filled with red paint on their backs. They walked around the college campus while the paint, symbolic of women's menstrual blood, leaked from the bags behind them. The action challenged the social taboo of touching or witnessing women's sexuality, which was considered to be impure and inappropriate. The follow-up series were later performed in Sheung Wan (HK) and Tokyo.

=== The Death of Siu Ling—1995 ===
Leung's next work was inspired by her stage performance at 20 Beans Theater, where female character Siu Ling committed suicide. The play attempted to portray the female as the violator (in contrast to the traditional view that females are victims). Leung assumed the role of Siu Ling and performed the role in a small room. Audiences stood outside, listening to classic music while observing her through a glass window. Ling, in the closed room without music, used a hammer to smash tomatoes until they spread across a white sheet "like blood". She painted the glass window with tomato sauce until the audience's view of Ling was completely obscured. Leung believed that females can be violent and that symbols used to represent female characteristics can also reflect harshness, such as needles and music. To Leung, tenderness and violence are two sides of the same coin. Leung utilized violence as the tool to attack stereotypical female images and then dislocated herself from the 'crime scene'. Leung's performance was attacked for erasing the performer's female identity.

=== Ten Steps One Kneel to Xin Ya—1996, 2003, 2005 ===
Besides her challenges to people's perception of female characteristics, Leung laments the loss of humanistic spirit. Ten Steps One Kneel to Xin Ya is a performance piece she revealed in 1996 at CUHK. At that time she read several books authored by Chi'en Mu, a master in sinology studies and realized that few students know about this scholar. The performance Carrying the book Xin Ya Yi Duo by Qian Mu showed her kneeling every ten steps while going up the mountain in Chinese University. The first time was a tribute to the college's spirits, the second time a personal struggle between studying and personal development and the third time in the middle of teaching languages.

=== Coffee Shop: a Para Site members’ collaboration— 1998 ===
This exhibition is a collaboration of Para Site members including Patrick Lee, Anthony Leung Po Shan, Leung Chi Wo, Leung Mee Ping, Phoebe Man Ching Ying, Kith Tsang Tak Ping, Sara Wong Chi Hang.

=== Love the Fucking Country—1998, 2000 ===
Leung once said that the elements and motives of creation were responding to the social environment. She felt that creative works should change with changes to the surrounding world. Love the Fucking Country was born in response to the 1997 transition "hangover". Leung projected the image of national flag on the ground for people to walk on. Later the image was projected on a melting ice cube, which then showed a twisted reflection of the flag.

== Ideas ==
She defined the relationship between her performance arts and visual arts as: 1) No matter how you use your body to achieve expression, it considers the visual perception first; 2) She combined her body with visual effects. Most of her movements were planned in advance with clear steps and procedures.

She emphasized textual information. Hr work started as texts. She responded to others and created works based on her own words. Leung also believed that hybrid curator/artist/critics could expose unique benefits. Leung claimed that scholars who could write about local art history correctly are more important than creative artists.
