= Au Hoi Lam =

Chinese painter (born 1978)

Au Hoi Lam (Chinese: 區凱琳; born 1978 in Hong Kong) is a Chinese painter. She has won several awards including the Nokia Arts Awards (2000) and the Hong Kong Arts Development Awards 2013 – Award for Young Artist (Visual Arts).

== Biography ==
Born and raised in Hong Kong, Au earned a Bachelor of Arts (2001) and a Master of Philosophy (2009) from the Chinese University of Hong Kong. In 2004 she debuted her catalogue Au Hoi Lam Painting Journal, as well as establishing her studio Tone Quarters in Fo Tan. She established studio Qiáng also in Fo Tan in 2010, with artists Tsang Chui-mei, AMA, and Vivian Poon. She is a part-time lecturer at the Department of Fine Arts, Chinese University of Hong Kong.

== Art ==
Au's first solo exhibition was in November 1999 when she presented paintings at Shaw College. She has held numerous solo exhibitions in Hong Kong and at MoCA, Shanghai where she was selected to exhibit in Reversing Horizons, where emerging contemporary artists reflected on the Hong Kong Handover for its 10th anniversary. She has also been part of group exhibitions in Hong Kong and South Korea. Au's works are documented in the Asia Art Archive. In 2006, Au showed works influenced by Guan Daosheng's poetry in the exhibition When Words are Sweet...Paintings by Au Hoi-lam at the Hong Kong Central Library.

Au's painting style is delicate and her paintings typically take a long time to produce. Her painting Handkerchief 86400 is typical of her meticulous approach to painting and featured 86,400 tiny squares, one coloured square for each second of a day. Her figurative paintings look like children's drawings and often use faded, pale colors. Au also produces wall-hung mixed media art works that are autobiographical and address key family events. These include My Father is Over the Ocean, in which Au brought together paintings and installations made in response to her father's illness and death, and Elsewhere (2011), which reveals the secret birth of her daughter.

Au's paintings have been collected by the Hong Kong Museum of Art.
