= Lai Cheuk Wah Sarah =

Hong Kong painter

Lai Cheuk Wah Sarah (born 1983) is a painter from Hong Kong. Her paintings are often sceneries and objects recreated by a signature pale palette.

== Background ==
Lai graduated from the Fine Arts Department, Chinese University of Hong Kong in 2007. In the same year, she received the Ramon Woon Creative Prize, Grotto Fine Arts Ltd.'s Creative Award and Cheng's Fine Arts Award in Western Painting.

Lai is also a finalist of the 2010 Sovereign Asian Art Prize.

== Style ==
Spotting the light onto a light (2012)

Lai's motif is the mundane. She describes her works as being based on things that are “ordinary...and missed easily.” Her works are about diverse subjects, ranging from the Moon and the sea to swimming pools, street corners and water towers.

== Solo exhibitions ==
- 2013 Spotting the light onto a light, SOUTHSITE, Hong Kong
- 2011 Safety Island, Gallery EXIT, Hong Kong
- 2010 Gallery EXIT, Hong Kong International Art Fair, Hong Kong Convention and Exhibition Centre, Hong Kong
- 2008 Bloom, Stage 1, Blue Lotus Gallery, Hong Kong

== Group exhibitions ==
- 2006 Annual Exhibition of Fine Arts - Year One Exhibition, Cheng Ming Building, New Asia College, CUHK, Hong Kong
- 2005 Year One Exhibition, Hui Gallery, New Asia College, CUHK
