= Tang Kwok Hin =

Tang Kwok Hin (Chinese: 鄧國騫) is a Hong Kong mixed media artist, working as an independent curator and writer. He was born in 1983 in Hong Kong. He received his Master of Fine Arts and Bachelor of Arts (major in Fine Art) from the Chinese University of Hong Kong in 2008 and 2006 respectively. His works were based on the exploration of the relationships between art and society by means of collage, he also tries giving new meanings to some ready-made objects by exploration and reconstructions.

== Career ==
Tang’s artwork is known for focusing on the theories of occasion, space, time and hidden rules which are existing in daily life. He describes his works as conceptual based symbolic collage himself. After quitting his place as a part-time visual arts teacher at the Hong Kong Institute of Contemporary Culture (HKICC) Lee Shau Kee School of Creativity, he now works as a full-time artist as well as a regular speaker at some educational talks and seminars in order to promote art. His works have been collected by a variety of art organizations such as the Hong Kong Museum of Art, Amelia Johnson Contemporary, Deutsche Bank and other private art collectors around the world. He also got many exhibition chances, the most significant one in Art Basel Hong Kong in 2013, displaying his work The weak are meat, while recently, in 2015, he also got solo exhibitions in Hong Kong and Taipei. Moreover, Tang also cooperates with some foreign and local artists in group exhibitions.

== Personal life ==
Tang Kwok Hin was born and raised in a walled village in Kam Tin, which makes him more into the relationship between urban development and nature. Most of the time, Tang's works focuses on the theme of city's development, which he tries finding something sceptical on. Tang has a good relationship with his family. As an artist who has just started his path, his parents are more than willing to help him with the artwork, by simply collecting or purchasing materials.

== Awards ==
=== 2011 ===
He got the honor to receive Hong Kong Arts Development Awards 2010, the Young Artist Award of Visual Arts presented by the Hong Kong Arts Development Council, the Special Prize “Personal Exhibition” and Selected Entry in the 5th International Arte Laguna Prize by Italian Cultural Association MOCA and Arte Laguna Office, as well as a place for Artists in the Neighbourhood Scheme V by Leisure and Cultural Services Department and Hong Kong Art Promotion Office.

=== 2010 ===
His work, Entanglement was selected to the entry of Finalist, Sovereign Asian Art Prize 2010 and he received 40 Under 40 Awards presented by Sovereign Art Foundation and Perspective Magazine respectively.

=== 2009 ===
He won First prize at Hong Kong Contemporary Art Biennial Award 2009 with his work, The Photo Book of Mu Mu Dao.
