= Chan Yuk Keung =

Hong Kong artist

Chan Yuk Keung (also known as Kurt) (陳育強) (1959-) is a Hong Kong artist.

Chan Yuk Keung was born in 1959. He graduated from the Department of Fine Arts of the Chinese University of Hong Kong in 1983. Later, he completed his Master of Fine Art in painting at the Cranbrook Academy of Art, Michigan, United States.

Chan started teaching in the Department of Fine Arts at Chinese University, lecturing on Western media design. He was the course leader of the Master of Fine Arts program there.

Chan has participated in over 80 exhibitions, including the 51st Venice Biennial and the 2nd Asia Pacific Triennial. His research interests are Hong Kong's local art, mixed media art, and public art. He was the editor of the Hong Kong Visual Arts Yearbook since 2000, the art governor of City Art Square, and also the advisor of the Asia Art Archive.

== Achievements ==
- First Prize of Public Art Scheme Competition (Tai Po Central Town Square) (1999)
- Second Prize of NORD/LB Art for Expo Competition (1999)
- Finalist for the Sculpture Competition for the Hong Kong Central Library (2000)

The Department of Fine Arts of the Chinese University of Hong Kong, Hong Kong Tramways, and advertising company POAD launched Phase 3 of ARTram Shelters. Chan worked on urban-inspired artworks that were displayed at tram shelters in Causeway Bay and Wan Chai.

In addition to providing tram shelters as street-level exhibition stage, Phase 3 further supports emerging artists via a mentorship arrangement with Chan Yuk Keung.

== Research publications ==
Project title	Place	Date
Hong Kong Art Appreciation for Primary School and Craft Teachers	Hong Kong Museum of Art, organized by the Education Department	20 November 1999
Opening Exhibition of the Art Section of Hong Kong Heritage Museum: A Piece of Digital Installation	Hong Kong: Hong Kong Heritage Museum	17 December 2000
Hong Kong Art 2000” (An installation "A Collection of Daily Specimen")	Hong Kong Museum of Art	25 November 2000
Local Accent - 12 Artists from Hong Kong	Pickled Art Centre, Beijing, China, organized by the Para/Site Art Space	27 December 2003
Hong Kong Visual Arts Yearbook 2003	Department of Fine Arts, The Chinese University of Hong Kong	September 2004
