= Chinese University of Hong Kong Art Museum =

The Chinese University of Hong Kong Art Museum
- 香港中文大學文物館
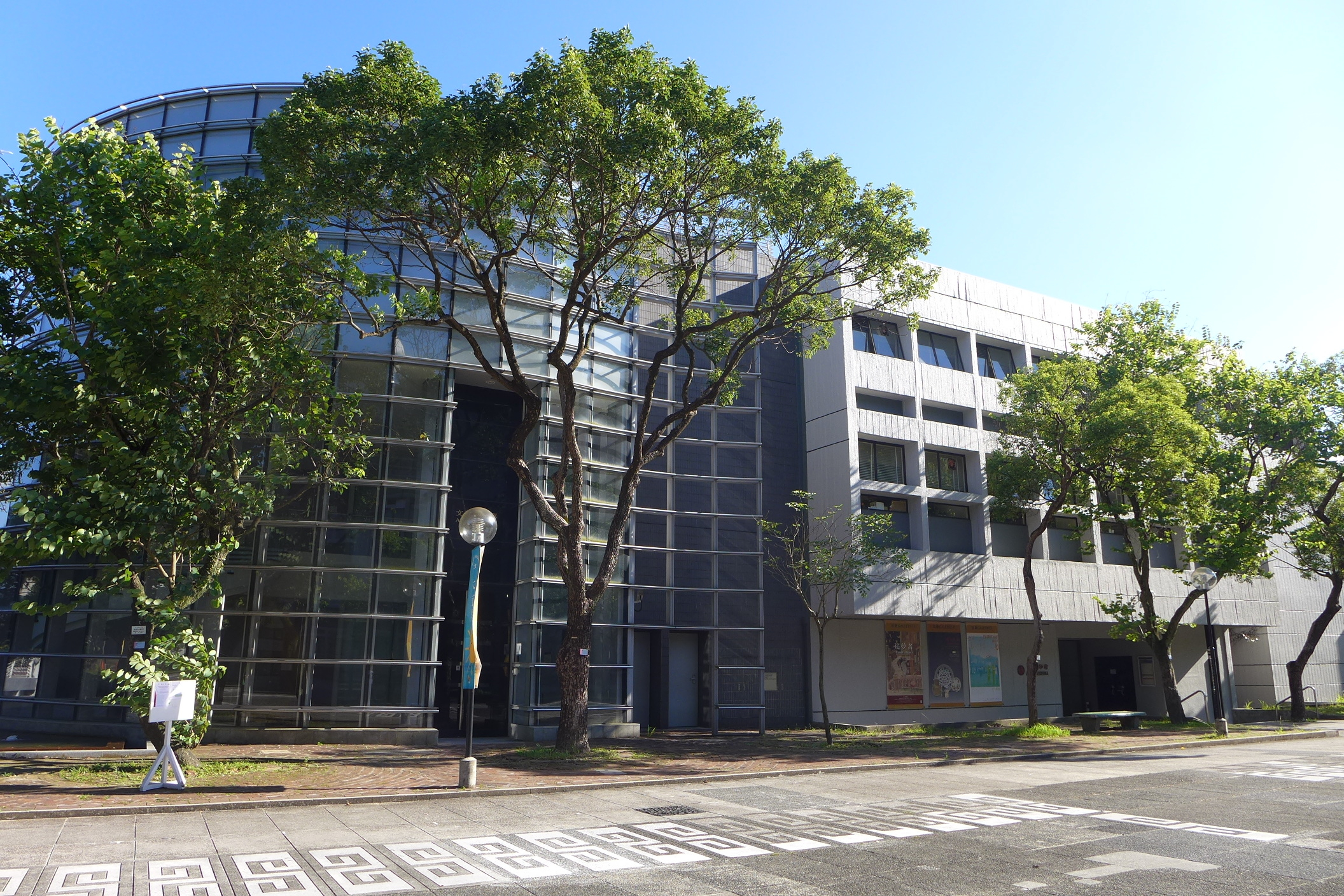
- The Chinese University of Hong Kong Art Museum
- Established: 1971
- Location: Chinese University of Hong Kong
- Coordinates: 22.419211°N 114.206062°E
- Type: Art museum
- Website: artmuseum.cuhk.edu.hk/en

Chinese name
- Traditional Chinese: 香港中文大學文物館
Transcriptions
Yue: Cantonese
- Yale Romanization: Hēung góng jūng màhn daaih hohk màhn maht gún
- Jyutping: Hoeng1 gong2 zung1 man4 daai6 hok6 man4 mat6 gun2

The Chinese University of Hong Kong Art Museum is an art museum located on the main campus of the Chinese University of Hong Kong.

== See also ==
- Department of Fine Arts, Chinese University of Hong Kong
- List of museums in Hong Kong
