= David Faure (historian) =

Hong Kong historical anthropologist

David William Faure (born 1947) is a Hong Kong historical anthropologist, and is an expert in the economic and social history of Southern China.

== Biography ==
Faure was born and educated in Hong Kong. He graduated from St. Paul's College and the Department of History of the University of Hong Kong, and later obtained a PhD in sociology from Princeton University.

From 1990 to 2006, he lectured Modern Chinese History at St. Anthony College, Oxford University, where he is now an Emeritus Fellow. He also taught in Indiana University. From 2010 to 2017, he led the project "The Historical Anthropology of Chinese Society" commissioned by the Hong Kong Government.

He is currently a retired professor in the Department of History at the Chinese University of Hong Kong (CUHK), and a former editor of the Journal of History and Anthropology (Chinese:歷史人類學學刊) as well as a former director of the Centre for China Studies, CUHK.

== Publications ==
- Faure, David (1986). The structure of Chinese Rural Society: Lineage and Village in the Eastern New Territories, Hong Kong. East Asian Historical Monographs. Hong Kong: Oxford University Press. ISBN 0-19-583970-6.
- Emperor and Ancestor: State and Lineage in South China, Stanford: Stanford University Press 2007. 皇帝和祖宗—华南的国家与宗族，江蘇人民出版社，2009。
- China and Capitalism, A History of Business Enterprise in Modern China, Hong Kong: Hong Kong University Press 2006.
- "La solution lignagere: la revolution rituelle du xviesiecle et 1 tat imperial chinois," Annales, Histoire, Sciences, Sociales 2006, 61:6, pp. 1291-1316.
- "The Yao Wars in the mid-Ming and their impact on Yao ethnicity," in Pamela Kyle Crossley, Helen Siu and Donald Sutton, eds. Empire at the Margins: Culture, Ethnicity and Frontier in Early Modern China, Berkeley: University of California Press, 2006, pp. 171-189.
- 人類學與中國近代社會史：影響與前景，東吳歷史學報，14, 2005, 頁 21-36。
- "The common people in Hong Kong history: their livelihood and aspirations until the 1930s," in Lee Pui-tak, ed. Colonial Hong Kong and Modern China, Interaction and Reintegration, Hong Kong: Hong Kong University Press, 2005, pp. 9-37.
- "Between house and home, the family in south China," in Ronald G. Knapp and Kai-yin Lo, eds. House Home and Family: Living and Being Chinese, Honolulu: University of Hawaii Press, 2005.
- “The local official in commercial litigation in early nineteenth-century China,” University of Tokyo Journal of Law and Politics, 2004, vol. 1, pp. 144-155.
- 《告別華南研究》，華南研究會編：《學步與超越﹕華南研究論文集》﹐香港﹕文化創造出版社﹐2004﹐頁9-30。
- A Documentary History of Hong Kong, vols. 2 Society and 3 Economy, (volume 3 co-edited with Pui-tak Lee), Hong Kong: Hong Kong University Press, 1997 and 2004.
- Colonialism and the Hong Kong Mentality, Hong Kong: Centre of Asian Studies, University of Hong Kong, 2003.
- “The original translocal society and its modern fate: historical and post-reform south China,” (with Helen Siu) Provincial China 8:1, 2003, pp. 40-59.
- 《祠堂與家廟: 從宋末到明中葉宗族禮儀的演變》，《歷史人類學學報》，1:2, 2003, 頁 1-20。
- “The Heaven and Earth Society in the nineteenth century: an interpretation,” in Kwang-ching Liu and Richard Shek, eds. Heterodoxy in Late Imperial China, Honolulu: University of Hawaii Press, 2004, pp. 365-392.
