= Koon Wai Bong =

Visual artist from Hong Kong

Koon Wai Bong (Chinese: 管偉邦; born 1974) is a visual artist from Hong Kong, specializing in landscape painting in ink, as well as installation.

== Biography ==
In Koon's youth, he was interested in visual art subjects like Western art, oil painting and drawing. In 1992, he entered the Department of Fine Arts, New Asia College, The Chinese University of Hong Kong. He began exploring Chinese painting, inspired by guohua artist Johnson Chou. He attained his bachelor's degree shortly afterwards through his study of various skills and the concepts of Chinese Literati Painting. Between 2000 and 2002, he studied in the MFA program at Chinese University of Hong Kong. The ink master Lü Shoukun became his role model as he explored a new style, embracing old and new traditions. In 2012, he gained his DFA degree from RMIT Melbourne.

His artworks are included in the permanent collections of the Asian Art Museum of San Francisco, M+, Los Angeles County Museum of Art, Ashmolean Museum (University of Oxford), and Hong Kong Museum of Art. He is currently living in Hong Kong and working as an artist and assistant professor at Hong Kong Baptist University.
