= Sara Tse =

Hong Kong visual artist

Sara Tse (Tse Suk Ting, Chinese: 謝淑婷; born 1974) is a Hong Kong visual artist. She uses porcelain as her medium of expression. She combines a mastery of technique with sophisticated lyricism by transforming common objects, which resonated with her, into porcelain, evoking feelings, memories and history. During the period of her study in university, she pioneered in using porcelain to present her creation concept, rather than solely an objects appreciated from aesthetics perspective. She is the chairperson of the Hong Kong Ceramics Association.

== Education ==
Sare Tse graduated from the Chinese University of Hong Kong with a major in Fine Arts. She received her MFA degree from the Royal Melbourne Institute of Technology, Australia.

== Works and exhibitions ==
Her works have been shown in many solo and group exhibitions in Hong Kong, Shanghai, Taiwan, New York, Chicago, Tokyo, Madrid, Queensland and Melbourne since 1995. Her works are in the collections of M+, Hong Kong Heritage Museum, Hong Kong Museum of Art and the Queensland Art Gallery, Australia. The venues included Queensland Art Gallery, Hong Kong Museum of Art (2003, 2010–2011) and Fukuoka Asian Art Museum (2009).

She had a site specific exhibition "Of Being There ..." in 2023 in Hong Kong, which was about the rich history of Wyndham street as well as the viewer's own experiences of Hong Kong's urban and natural landscapes, together with the sharing of her childhood memories. The exhibition's Chinese title "Sheng, Cun, Zai" conveys the idea of living with the dual intention of preserving the past while being mindful of the present. Porcelain objects, installation, sculptures, drawings and videos were found in the exhibition. Some newly created some created by the artists since 2009. Porcelain casts made from leaves collected in school she studied were displayed. Vintage illustrations of flowers and newly created paper flowers by artists - a homage to a 19th-century botanical garden that served as a sanctuary for exotic plants.

Her work "Time Traveller", created in 2014, was acquired by M+ and displayed in the M+ exhibition "Hong Kong - Here and Beyond" in November 2021 - June 2023. The installation work consists of old sewing machine, rocking chair, dressing table, on which placed with a number of white color objects (ball of yarn, embroidery cloth, hat, teddy bear, diary etc) which looks like real objects but are porcelains indeed.

In 2018, she had an exhibition " Re Visit " in Hong Kong in Tai Kwun, a homage to the historical buildings and their surroundings. She referenced old hand-painted maps, using Chinese calligraphy brushes to trace along the lines of these maps onto expendable rice paper, then turned the latter to porcelain replicas similarly to the real maps. Some of these were then cut and displayed in the form of slides through a projector. Some porcelain common objects were also displayed : a pair of socks, a young girl's qipao, a toddler's crocheted cardigan, and even a plush teddy bear. All were reconstructions of actual items into porcelain by heating up the clay soaked items. The objects were incinerated and what remained after the process was the exact replica of the objects, but in porcelain.

== Awards ==
She was the award winner of the Hong Kong Art Biennial Exhibition in 2003 and she also won the Ceramic Award from The Friends of the Pottery Workshop in 1998. She received a number of grants including "Fond Des Artistes" from Alliance Francaise in 2006 and project grants from the Hong Kong Arts Development Council in 2002 and 1999.
