= CUHK Faculty of Arts =

Faculty of the Chinese University of Hong Kong

The Chinese University of Hong Kong Faculty of Arts is the arts faculty of the Chinese University of Hong Kong.

== History ==
It was founded in 1963.

Yu Ying-shih, one of the Arts Faculty's first generation of graduates, was a student of Qian Mu and a former pro-vice-chancellor of the university. He was a historian and a recipient of the John W. Kluge Prize for lifetime achievement in the humanities.

== Degrees offered ==
The faculty offers both undergraduate and postgraduate level degree programmes.

=== Undergraduate ===
- Anthropology
- Chinese Language and Literature
- Cultural Management
- Cultural Studies
- English
- Fine Arts
- History
- Japanese Studies
- Linguistics
- Music
- Philosophy
- Religious Studies
- Theology
- Translation

The faculty also offers the following programmes to students:

- BA (Translation) and JD: A double-degree programme, where JD is a postgraduate degree, jointly offered with the Faculty of Law.
- LLB and BA (Translation): A double-degree programme, jointly offered with the Faculty of Law.
- BA (Chinese Language and Literature) and BEd (Chinese Language Education): A co-terminal double-degree programme, jointly offered with the Faculty of Education.
- BA (English Studies) and BEd (English Language Education): A co-terminal double-degree programme, jointly offered with the Faculty of Education.

=== Postgraduate ===
Research (Doctor/Master)

- Anthropology
- Chinese Language and Literature
- Cultural Studies
- Applied English Linguistics
- Literary Studies
- Fine Arts (Master only)
- History of Chinese Art
- History
- Japanese Studies (Master only)
- Linguistics
- Music
- Philosophy
- Religious Studies
- Translation

Taught (Master)

- Anthropology
- Anthropology of Chinese Societies
- Chinese Language and Literature
- Intercultural Studies
- Cultural Management
- Visual Culture Studies
- Applied English Linguistics
- Fine Arts
- Comparative and Public History
- Japanese Language and Teaching
- Linguistics
- Chinese Linguistics and Language Acquisition
- Music
- Philosophy
- Religious Studies
- Christian Studies
- Divinity
- Theological Studies
- Translation
- Computer-Aided Translation

Taught (Postgraduate Diploma)

- Cultural Anthropology
- Chinese Language and Literature

== Honorary professors ==
- The current dean of the Faculty of Arts: Professor Leung Yuen Sang
- Associate dean of arts (student affairs): Professor Cheng Chung Yi
- Associate dean of arts (education): Professor Lai Pan Chiu
- Associate dean of arts (research): Professor Thomas Lee Hun Tak
- Sin Wai Kin Professor of Chinese Culture: Professor Leo Ou Fan Lee
- Wei Lun Professor of Humanities: Professor Pai Hsien-yung
- Professor of humanities: Professor Zhao Zhenkai (Bei Dao)

== Campus ==
The headquarters of the Faculty of Arts is at the Fung King Hey Building located in the Chinese University of Hong Kong.

== See also ==
- Chinese University of Hong Kong
- Department of Fine Arts, Chinese University of Hong Kong
- Faculty of Arts
- University of Hong Kong Faculty of Arts
