= Ko Sin Tung =

Visual artist from Hong Kong

- Chinese: 高倩彤
Transcriptions
Standard Mandarin
- Hanyu Pinyin: Gāo Qiàntóng
Yue: Cantonese
- Jyutping: gou1 sin6 tung4

Ko Sin Tung (Chinese: 高倩彤; born 1987) is a visual artist from Hong Kong. She is a graduate from the Department of Fine Arts at The Chinese University of Hong Kong. Her art explores the relationship with the urban environment, domestic space, and impact of condition. She is represented by Edouard Malingue Gallery in Hong Kong.

Ko has exhibited at the Tai Kwun Contemporary, Para Site in Hong Kong, National Taiwan Museum of Fine Arts, and Central Academy of Fine Arts Art Museum in Beijing, amongst other locations.

== Biography ==
She graduated from Chinese University of Hong Kong in 2009 with a Bachelor of Arts in Fine Arts.

Ko's works include Dust and Trivial Matters (2019), which she uses "plastic film stretched over aluminium frames blocks off portions of each room (of a bunker) and creates narrow alleyways and low ceilings", and "leaves it to the audience to decide whether they are being protected from or deprived of something."; Adaptation (2019), is "a group of white-spray-painted cast-silicon molds of home and garden accessories"; Surface (2019), a work "initially looked like exposed drywall"; 無敵海景 (Spectacular sea view) (2015), "a rueful spin on a real estate catchphrase associated with multimillion dollar apartments"; and ‘Modern Home Collection’ (2013), an array of framed, pixelated prints of domestic objects collected from Internet searches.

== Exhibitions ==
=== Solo exhibitions ===
- Adaptation, Edouard Malingue Gallery, Hong Kong (2019)
- Dust and trivial matters, The Bunker, Beijing, China (2019)
- Absent Store, Holy Motors, Hong Kong (2016)
- Underground Construction: Failed, Edouard Malingue Gallery, Hong Kong (2015)

=== Group exhibitions (selected) ===
- Rehearsal, Tai Kwun Contemporary, Hong Kong (2018)
- Women in Art: Hong Kong, Sotheby's, Hong Kong (2018)
- From Ocean to Horizon, Centre for Chinese Contemporary Art, Manchester, UK (2017)
- Breathing Space, Asia Society (2017)
- Eros, University Museum and Art Gallery, The University of Hong Kong, Hong Kong (2014)

== Awards and residencies ==
Ko is the recipient of awards including Project Grant (Emerging Artists Scheme) from the Hong Kong Arts Development Council (2014), the Pure Art Foundation Grant 2013–2014 (2014) and Jury’s Special Prize of Huayu Youth Award (2016).
