= Gongbi =

Realist technique in Chinese painting

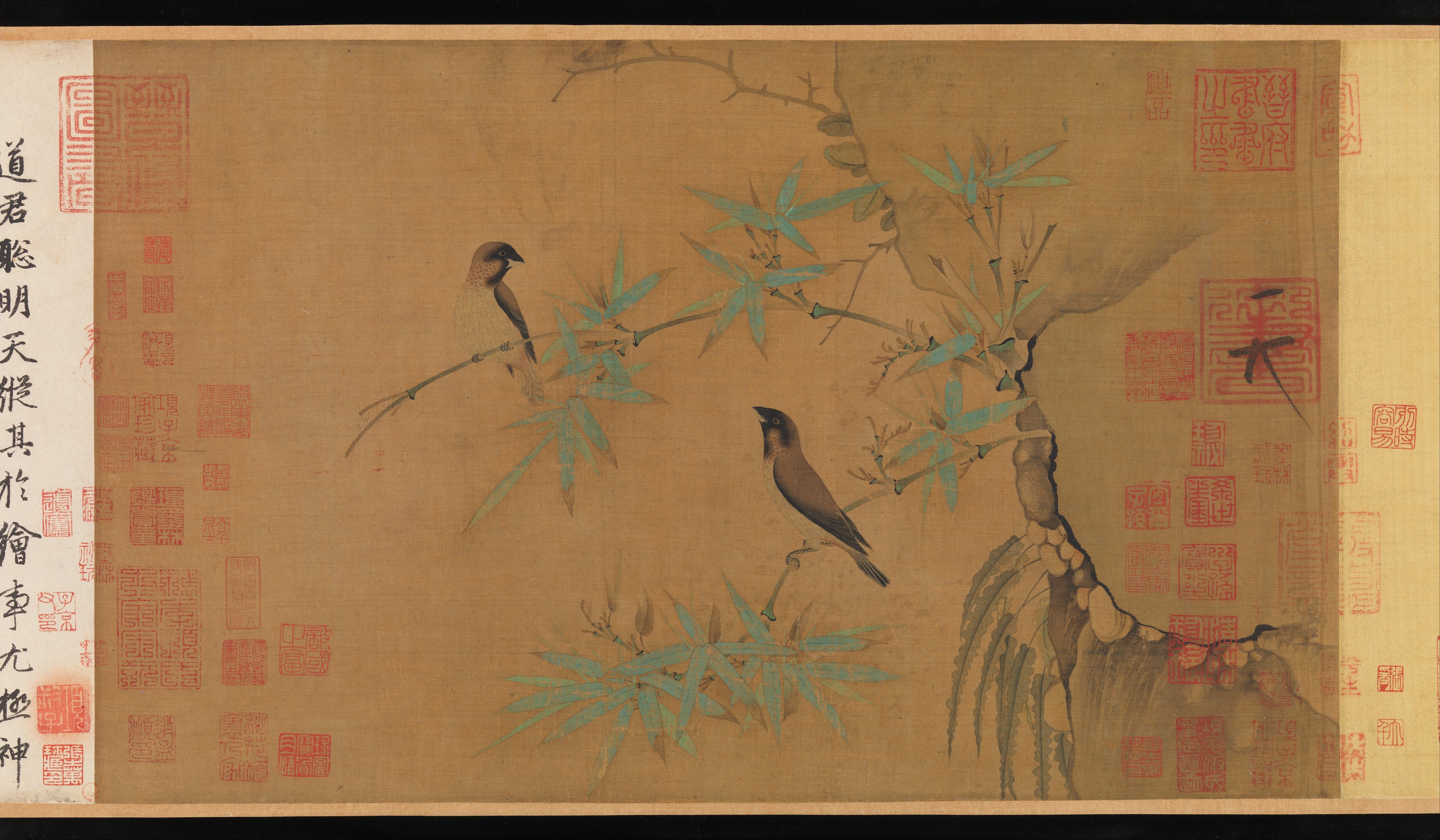
Finches and Bamboo (11th century) by Emperor Huizong of Song

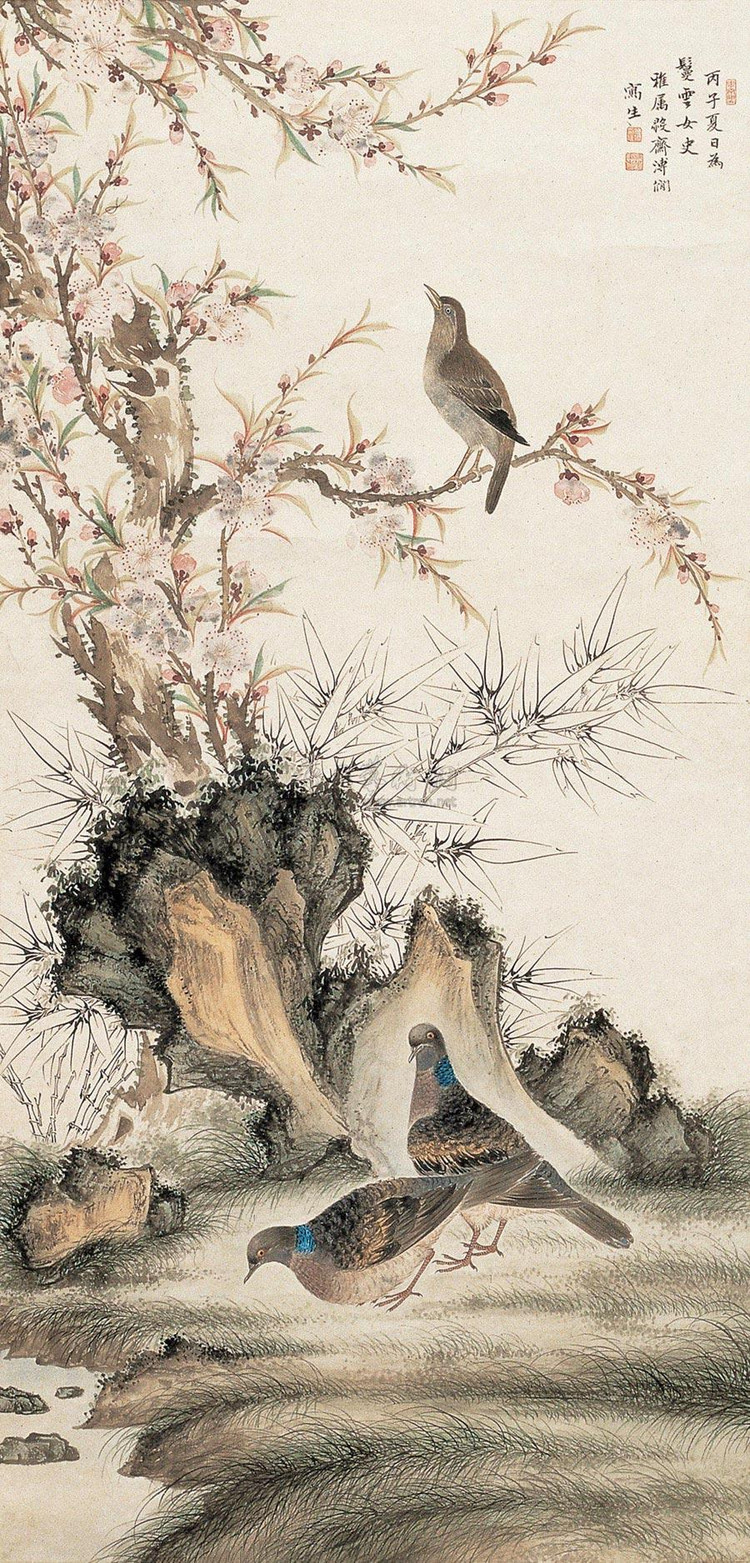
by Puxian, a Beile of the Qing dynasty

Gongbi (simplified Chinese: 工笔; traditional Chinese: 工筆; pinyin: gōng bǐ; Wade–Giles: kung-pi) is a careful realist technique in Chinese painting, the opposite of the interpretive and freely expressive xieyi (寫意 'sketching thoughts') style.

The name is from the Chinese gong jin meaning 'tidy' (meticulous brush craftsmanship). The gongbi technique uses highly detailed brushstrokes that delimits details very precisely and without independent or expressive variation. It is often highly colored and usually depicts figural or narrative subjects.

The term related to gongbi, jiehua (Traditional: 界畫, Simplified: 界画) meaning "boundary painting", refers to the accurate depiction of architectural forms aided by the ruler.

== History ==
The gongbi style had its beginnings approximately 2000 years ago during the Han dynasty (206 BC – 220 AD), when Han's political stability and its prosperity favored the advancement of the arts. These paintings peaked out between the Tang and Song dynasties (7th to 13th centuries) when these refined paintings were endorsed and collected by the royal families of China. To perfect this style, the gongbi artists must totally commit themselves to these techniques. Only the wealthy could afford such artists. This style of art was accomplished in secret in royal palaces and private homes. Gongbi is one of the oldest Chinese painting techniques that feature narratives or high authority figures in them.

== Tools ==
When using brushes to paint gongbi, there are specific types for contouring and colouring. There are four types of brushes for contouring; Hong Mao (red hairs), are used to draw thick strokes mainly for landscape and background visuals. Yi Wen is used for longer lines to paint clothing, for example. Ye Jing brushes are used to contour flowers and bedsheets. Xie Zhua is the finest contour brush used to paint strokes of dragonflies and specific detail in the painting. There are three sizes of brushes used to colour the surface of the painting: Da Bai Yun (large white cloud), Zhong Bai Yun (average white cloud) and Xiao Bai Yun (small white cloud). Rough drafts are usually drawn on Xuan paper. If there is only one draft, a special type of paper called Xuan paper is used. There are two different kinds of Xuan paper. One is called Shu Xuan paper (cooked rice paper). It is usually used for Gongbi. Another kind is Sheng Xuan paper (raw rice paper). It is usually used for Xieyi ( 'sketch-thought style painting'). The soft paper is able to absorb water well, best used for Chinese painting and calligraphy. Silk can also be used, which is sized as well.

== Process of the craft ==
Gongbi requires drawing with fine lines first to represent the exaggerated likenesses of the objects, and then adds washes of ink and color layer by layer, so as to approach the perfection of exquisiteness and fine art. The practice of Gongbi is specifically on rice paper when sketching out the design and layout of the drawing. Typically, pencil is used before beginning the second draft with the tipped brushes. The variation and detail in strokes are important especially when layering each wash of ink on top of each other. There are upward and downward strokes used that emphasize detailed pictures such as facial features and insects. After hundreds of years, a technique was developed for all gongbi artists as a system. Lines are used first to contour the figure and determine the fine outlines of the painting. Modest colors are added to the painting that add onto a sense of nature; flamboyant colors are used when the content of the painting has accentuated lines.

== Gongbi painters ==
Listed chronologically:

- Yan Liben (c. 600–673)
- Zhang Xuan (713–755)
- Zhou Fang (c. 730–800)
- Gu Hongzhong (937–975)
- Emperor Huizong of Song (1082–1135)
- Tang Yin (1470–1524)
- Qiu Ying (1494–1552)
- Chen Hongshou (1598–1652)

== See also ==
- Art movement
- Creativity techniques
- List of art media
- List of artistic media
- List of art movements
- List of most expensive paintings
- List of most expensive sculptures
- List of art techniques
- List of sculptors
