= Ho Siu Kee =

Hong Kong artist (born 1964)

Ho Siu Kee 何兆基
- Born: 1964 (age 61–62); Hong Kong
- Education: Department of Fine Arts, CUHK (1989); MFA degree in Sculpture from the Cranbrook Academy of Art (1995); Doctor of Fine Art degree from Royal Melbourne Institute of Technology (2003)
- Known for: Performance Art, Installation Art, Sculpture
- Notable work: Women and Blood Series (1993–1995); Love the Fucking Country (1997, 2000); Ten Steps One Kneel to Xin Ya (1996, 2003, 2005)

Ho Siu-Kee (Chinese: 何兆基; born 1964) is a visual artist from Hong Kong. His artistic and academic research focuses on exploring bodily perceptions as a means and process of aesthetic expression.

== Education ==
Ho received a Bachelor of Fine Arts degree from the Department of Fine Arts, Chinese University of Hong Kong in 1989. He graduated from Cranbrook Academy of Art in 1995 with an MFA majoring in sculpture, and received his Doctorate in Fine Art from the RMIT University, Australia in 2003.

== Career ==
Ho's works focus on the bodily experience, using his own body to heighten his senses and spatial awareness, employing different media including sculpture, installation, photography and video.

He is also an art educator. He worked in the School of Design at Hong Kong Polytechnic University from 1997 to 2000. In 2000, he joined the Hong Kong Arts Centre to help the establishment of its art education division namely Hong Kong Art School. Before teaching at Hong Kong Baptist University, Dr. Ho was the Academic Head of Hong Kong Art School.

== Exhibitions ==
=== Solo exhibitions ===
Year	Title	Venue
2012	Aureola: Ho Siu Kee	Grotto Fine Art, Hong Kong
2012	Heavenly Mundanity: sculpture x photography by Ho Siu Kee	Lumenvisum, Hong Kong
2009	Ho Siu Kee: The Constrained Body	Grotto Fine Art, Hong Kong
2006	Ho Siu-kee: Body Gesture	Grotto Fine Art, Hong Kong & Hong Kong Arts Centre
2003	The Visible Form of Intention – Works by HO, Siu-kee	Grotto Fine Art, Hong Kong
2000	Connotative Body - Works by Ho, Sui kee	IT Park, Taipei
1999	Per / Con-Ceptural Body: Works by Ho, Siu-Kee	Hong Kong Arts Center

=== Group shows ===
Year	Title	Venue
2015	The Human Body: Measure and Norms	Blindspot Gallery, Hong Kong
2013	Déjà Disparu	Pearl Lam Galleries, Hong Kong
2012	Cityzening	Jorge B. Vargas Museum and Filipiniana Research Center, Quezon City, Philippines
2011	Strolling on the Water - Hong Kong Contemporary Art Exhibition	Westlake Museum of Contemporary Art, Hangzhou, China
2010	You Are Here, I Am Not. From Ho Siu Kee to Kong Chun	Osage Gallery, Hong Kong
2009	Charming Experience	Hong Kong Museum of Art
2007	Reversing Horizon	MOCA Shanghai
2007	Pivotal Decade – Hong Kong Art 1997-2007	Chinese Arts Centre, Manchester, UK
2004	Speed Up	Swiss Sports Museum, Basel
2004	Gods Becoming Men	Frissiras Museum, Athens
2001	Translated Acts – Performance and Body Art from East Asia	Haus der Kulturen der Welt, Berlin & Queens Museum of Art, New York
1999	Fast>>Forward: New Chinese Video Art	Fundacao Oriente Contemporary Art Museum, Macao; Galerie Rudolfinum, Czech Republic
1998	Inside/Out: New Chinese Art	Asia Society, New York & San Francisco Museum of Modern Art
1997	Hong Kong Art 1997	National Museum of Fine Arts, Beijing and Guangdong; Museum of Art, Guangzhou
1997	Cities on the Move	Vienna Secession, Austria & capc Musee d’art Contemporain de Bordeaux, France & P.S.1 Contemporary Art Center, New York
1992	City Vibrance	Hong Kong Museum of Art

== Awards ==
- 2012 Associate Member of the Royal Society of Sculptors.
- 2015 Artist of the Year (Visual Arts), Hong Kong Arts Development Awards.
