= Hong Kong Reincarnated – New Lo Ting Archaeological Find =

Hong Kong Reincarnated – New Lo Ting Archaeological Find (香港三世書之再世書：盧亭考古新發現) was an exhibition held at the Hong Kong Arts Centre from 20 June – 14 July 1998.

Oscar Ho, the curator, considered the Lo Ting (a fictional tribe of half-man, half-fish creatures) as a purported ancestor of the Tanka tribes from whom the indigenous Hong Kongers descended. Drawing inspiration from archaeological findings, anthropological interpretations of myths and stories, paleobiological data, and literature sources, the curator invited artists to create “tangible and intangible evidence” of the Lo Ting. It was the second installment of a series of exhibitions that looked into an alternative version of local histories. The history of Lo Ting was first presented in the exhibition Museum 97: History, Community, Individual (九七博物館：歷史社群個人, 23 June - 12 July 1997, Hong Kong Arts Centre). Hong Kong Reincarnated – New Lo Ting Archaeological Find was an ambitious attempt to further elaborate on the historical narratives of the mythical creature that enabled visitors to decipher the historical discourses and the processes related to local identities.

== Myth of the Lo Ting ==
According to New Narratives of Guangdong by the Qing scholar Qu Dajun, the Lo Ting, a half-man, half-fish hybrid, were living around the Lantau Island area. The aquatic creatures looked human with yellowish-dark eyes and bodies covered with short, brownish hair. The story tells of a man who brought a female Lo Ting onto the land, offering her food and clothes and teaching her to talk. Curiously, Lo Ting does not appreciate such kindness and wants to return to the sea, choosing an "uncivilised form of living".

== Exhibition concept ==
In creating a fictional but convincing narrative, this exhibition intended to adopt a disembodied, omniscient voice of authority, to offer “objective” readings of the presence and absence of archaeological findings. First, it addressed participating artists as members from Team 20, a department of excavation affiliated with the Research Centre of Ancient History in Nanhai. They were assigned to be involved in the curatorial process at different organisations, such as the fictional Hong Kong Lo Ting Research Association and Friends of Lo Ting. These “unofficial organisations” were ingenious appropriations of the academic units that had conducted surveys and investigations on Chek Lap Kok Island, the archaeological site of the rich relics from the Middle Neolithic period, about 6,000 years ago.

The curatorial team meticulously designed the exhibition space to look like a modernist museum. Exhibits were shown in glass cases with wooden frames and miniature models, and maps were used to illustrate the geographical environment of the Lo Ting settlements. The “artifacts” were framed within the disciplinary context of archaeology, using photographs, diagrams, documents, and scientific data (such as the measurements of objects) to demonstrate how the artifacts were excavated and to depict their historical significance. By blurring the boundaries between historical facts and imaginative fabrication, many of the creative works were flawed in some way to allow audiences to question the “museum presentation” as a constructed convention. Thus, it created a condition for audiences to examine, verify, and interpret the historical narratives based on their thoughts and beliefs.

== About the curator ==
Oscar Ho was the Exhibition Manager of HKAC in the 1990s, and started to include local art and visual cultures in his exhibition programmes in the early 1990s.

In Search of Art (25 October – 17 November 1990) (co-conceived by art historian David Clarke and Oscar Ho) was a landmark exhibition that addressed the viewing publics and their perceptions of art in Hong Kong. Members of the public were asked to nominate objects as art, accompanying by a short statement to explain their choices. The resulted exhibition featured many objects that were largely related to personal memory and fantasy.

As an artist, Ho has mounted an installation-exhibition titled Engaging Tradition: Violation (19 March – 14 May 1994) at the University Museum and Art Gallery, HKU, to create a dialogue with the pasts and traditions reflectively by juxtapositing everyday objects from contemporary life and the Museum's collection.

Oscar Ho has long term interest in institutional critique in art, and in the context of the "Museum 97" series, he revisited how history being told in institutional setting and by authority, and against the grand narratives. “Since the early nineties, when Hong Kong's return to China was becoming imminent, its people have discussed the question of Hong Kong's cultural identity with increasing fervor. Out of insecurity, we have exaggerated our uniqueness and have tried hard to solidify, even fabricate, a distinctive cultural identity, which for some did not exist. As a presenter of culture, a curator can play a role in helping to shape this discourse.” Oscar Ho put in an essay in 1998.

== Participating artists ==
The artists include AU Kawai, CHAN Chihang, CHAN Kachun, HO Yuenleung, LAU Ying, LEUNG Wanyee Janice, LIU Chiwai, Luke CHING, NG Chiwai, NG Tszkwan, NG Waiming, SHEK Mingfai Phil, SIT Likhoi, WAN Laikuen Annie, YAN Patto, YAU Puiwah, YEUNG Waikeung, and YU Chiushan.

== See also ==
- HA Bik Chuen Archive, (1998) Hong Kong Reincarnated: New Lo Ting Archaeological Find (Set of 51 photographs) Accessed on 23 November 2019.
- HO, Hingkay, Oscar, et al. (1997) Museum 97: History, Community, Individual. Hong Kong: Hong Kong Arts Centre.
- HO, Hingkay Oscar (1998) Hong Kong Reincarnated – New Lo Ting Archaeological Find. Hong Kong: Hong Kong Arts Centre.
- HO, Hingkay Oscar (1999) “Invented History”, in Ho, O. and Wear, E. (eds), Hong Kong Art Review (Hong Kong: The International Association of Art Critics), 46–53.
- HO, Hingkay Oscar (2016) "Critical Curatorship", UNESCO Observatory Multi-Disciplinary Journal in the Arts 5:2, 1–13.
- HO, Hingkay Oscar (2016) Deconstruct and Edit: Oscar Ho on the Art of Curating. Hong Kong: MMCM Creations.
- Art Criticism for the People : News Clippings Collection of Oscar Ho Hing-Kay 1980-90s. Typesetter Publishing, 2020. [In Chinese]
- Para Site Art Space (2004) Mapping Identities: The Art and Curating of Oscar Ho. Hong Kong: Para Site Art Space.
- WONG, Michelle, (2017) "What Two Hong Kong Exhibitions Reveal about the Handover, Identity, and Contemporary Art", IDEAS: AAA Online Journal Accessed on 23 November 2019.
