= David J. Clarke =

David James Clarke (born 1954) is honorary professor of modern and contemporary art history at the University of Hong Kong where he taught from 1986 to 2017. He was born in Somerset, England, earned his PhD in art history from the Courtauld Institute of Art, University of London, in 1983. As an art historian he specialises in the art of Europe, North America and China from the eighteenth century to the present day. He is also active as a visual artist, particularly as a photographer.

== Selected publications ==
=== Journal articles ===
Clarke’s scholarly articles have been published in journals such as Art History, Art Journal, Journal of American Studies, Oriental Art, Public Culture, The American Journal of Semiotics, Art Criticism, Postcolonial Studies, Journal of Visual Culture, Early Music, Semiotica, Asian Art News, Curtis’s Botanical Magazine, Hong Kong Journal of Applied Linguistics, Localities, and Third Text.

=== Books ===
- Modern Art: A Graphic Guide, Camden Press, 1987.
- The Influence of Oriental Thought on Postwar American Painting and Sculpture, Garland Publishing, 1988.
- Art and Place: Essays on Art from a Hong Kong Perspective, Hong Kong University Press, 1996.
- Modern Chinese Art, Oxford University Press, 2000.
- Hong Kong Art: Culture and Decolonization, Reaktion Books, 2001.
- Reclaimed Land: Hong Kong in Transition, Hong Kong University Press, 2002.
- Hong Kong x 24 x 365: A Year in the Life of a City, Hong Kong University Press, 2007.
- Water and Art, Reaktion Books, 2010.
- Chinese Art and its Encounter with the World, Hong Kong University Press, 2011.
- Interruptions (co-author with Xu Xi), University Museum and Art Gallery, The University of Hong Kong, 2016.
- China-Art-Modernity: A Critical Introduction to Chinese Visual Expression from the Beginning of the Twentieth Century to the Present Day, Hong Kong University Press, 2019.

== Online projects ==
- "A history of modern art in 73 lectures by David Clarke". YouTube. 4 June 2017.
- "Hong Kong Art Archive". arthistory.hku.hk.
- "Hong Kong in Transition" "An open access photographic archive for anyone interested in Hong Kong and its history". arthistory.hku.hk. Archived from the original on 20 March 2025.

== Selected solo exhibitions ==
- Hong Kong Nocturne, Goethe-Gallery, Goethe-Institut Inter Nationes, Hong Kong, 2002
- 1968 / 2002, University Museum and Art Gallery, The University of Hong Kong, Hong Kong, 2003
- Reclaimed Land: Hong Kong in Transition, University Museum and Art Gallery, The University of Hong Kong, 2005
- A Year in the Life of a City: Recent Photographs by David Clarke, University Museum and Art Gallery, The University of Hong Kong, 2007
- Hong Kong Experience: An Exhibition of Photographs by David Clarke, Brewhouse Gallery, Royal William Yard, Plymouth, England, 2007
- From Photography to Music: a creative dialogue between David Clarke and Chan Hing-yan, University Museum and Art Gallery, University of Hong Kong, 2013
- Interruptions, University Museum and Art Gallery, The University of Hong Kong, 2016

== Selected group exhibitions ==
- Museum 97: History, Community, Individual. (Hong Kong Incarnated), Hong Kong Arts Centre, Hong Kong, 1997
- Human Rights, Museum of International Contemporary Art, Florianópolis, Brazil, 1998
- Asian Traffic, Asia-Australia Arts Centre, Sydney, Australia, 2004
- Copied Right, Para/Site Art Space, Hong Kong, 2007
- Critical Proximity, Lianzhou, Guangdong Province, China, 2007
- Para/Site Portfolios, I/xx: Hong Kong Flat, The Rotunda, Exchange Square, Hong Kong, 2007
- Pan-demonium, at AC Institute, New York, US, 2009
- SoundGate, Kunsten, Utzon Centre, and Platform4, Aalborg, Denmark, 2010
- Market Forces, Osage Kwun Tong, Osage Art Foundation, Hong Kong, 2012
- City Impressions, Agnes b Cinema, Hong Kong Arts Centre, 2016
- ‘20/20: Hong Kong Print Art Exhibition’, Hong Kong Heritage Museum, Hong Kong, 2020–21
- New Horizons: Ways of Seeing Hong Kong Art in the 80s and 90s, Hong Kong Museum of Art, Hong Kong, 2021–22
- Hong Kong Cultural Day, Quedam Shopping Centre, Yeovil, Somerset, England, 2022

== Creative writing ==
- A poem by Clarke was included in the anthology Fifty-Fifty: New Hong Kong Writing (ed. Xu Xi, Haven Books, 2008).
- A poem was set to music in Hong Kong Odyssey, presented in the 2017 Hong Kong Arts Festival.
- ‘A jellyfish explains life’, a short fictional text, was presented on the website of the literary magazine Cha in 2022.

== Public service ==
Clarke has played a variety of public service roles in Hong Kong. He was External Moderator for the Strategic Planning Group which developed the Hong Kong Arts Development Council’s first strategic plan (1994-1996) and also served on the HKADC’s Visual Arts Committee from 1995-6. He served as a member of the Board of Governors of the Hong Kong Arts Centre between 1994 and 2005. Clarke was involved with setting up the Hong Kong Art School, acting as the first chair of its Academic Committee and as a founding member of its Council (2000-2010). He was also a member of the Museums Advisory Group (2005-2006) which developed the conceptual plan for M+ (opened in 2021). He served on the West Kowloon Cultural District Authority’s Museum Committee between 2014 and 2016 and as a member of the Board of the Corporate Trustee of the M+ Collections Trust (which holds legal ownership of the M+ collections on behalf of the Hong Kong people as the beneficial owners) from 2016–2022.

In roles outside of Hong Kong, Clarke served on the College Art Association’s International Committee (2002-2005), and as a member of the External Review Panel, Arts Quality Assurance Framework, Singapore Ministry of Education, 2018–2020.
