= Hong Kong in Transition 1995–2020 =

Freely accessible photography archive focusing on Hong Kong recent history

Hong Kong in Transition 1995–2020 is an online and freely accessible photography archive that focuses on the recent history of Hong Kong.

The archive comprises more than 40,000 photographs taken by artist and academic David J. Clarke who taught modern and contemporary art history and theory at the University of Hong Kong until his retirement in 2017. Documenting everyday life, the photographs span twenty-five years, from 1 January 1995 to 1 January 2020. The archive is hosted by the Department of Art History at the University of Hong Kong. The archive highlights a period that includes key moments in Hong Kong's recent history, including the Handover of Hong Kong, the Asian financial crisis, and the SARS crisis.

The archive is browsable by dates and keywords such as artists' names, street names, arts organizations, and broader categories including architecture, barricades, clouds, disasters, food, memorials, nightlife, and temples, among others. It serves as a resource about Hong Kong visual culture and communities, and is open to members of the public as well as students and researchers. Users are free to download a limited number of low-resolution images for educational use and personal use of non-commercial nature.
