= Leung Mee Ping =

Hong Kong artist

- Born: 1961 (age 64–65)
- Education: École nationale supérieure des Beaux-Arts
- Occupation: Artist

Chinese name
- Chinese: 梁美萍
- Hanyu Pinyin: Liáng Měipíng
- Yale Romanization: Lèuhng Méihpìhng
- Jyutping: Loeng4 Mei5-ping4

Leung Mee Ping (梁美萍; born 1961) is a Hong Kong artist. Leung's research-based artistic practice integrates elements of theatre, design, and social space. Leung's works explore issues and themes related to visual culture, effects of globalisation, memory, and material culture.

== Personal life and education ==
Leung Mee Ping grew up in a broken family. While studying in primary school, she won a drawing competition. Since that time, she started to fall into drawing and calligraphy.

Leung moved out when she was very young after her parents separated. Despite this, she has always been close to her mother and sisters, who support her and are a main theme of Leung's artworks. After working in a bookstore for two years, Leung saved up and was admitted into École nationale supérieure des Beaux-Arts. In 1983, Leung Mee Ping left Hong Kong and began her art studies in Paris. There, she learned to paint in abstract and expressionist styles. Before she graduated from L' École nationale supérieure des Beaux-Arts a Paris in 1991, she started exploring with alternative materials to create art. She began creating her work, "Elsewhere (1991-2014)", initiated by a close friend's passing, during this time. It is a mixed media installation consisting of thousands of tea bags sewn together. Made through the repetitive action of sewing teabags, Leung's work is meditative contemplation on being and death. She won the Premier prix Rocheron Award for this work in 1991. Apart from tea bags, various objects such as quail eggs, photos, tiles etc. began to be incorporated in Leung's mixed media art and installation works.

After returning to Hong Kong in 1994, she held her first solo exhibition "Mixed-Media Work by LEUNG MEE PING" in Fringe Club. Leung also worked as an art editor of the Hong Kong Economic Times (hket, a financial daily in Hong Kong). In early 1996, she became a founding member of Para Site, helping to set up the new artist-run space. In 1998, she emigrated to USA and obtained her MFA from California Institute of Arts in 2000.

Following her MFA, Leung obtained a PhD from Chinese University of Hong Kong (Religious & Cultural Studies Department). In 2018, she became a professor at the Academy of Visual Arts, Hong Kong Baptist University.

== Exhibitions ==
Leung's works mainly focuses on the ethic, community and memories of the human living situation, They also examine daily life through the perception of daily life itself. Art genres include mixed-media, video, multi-media installation and site-specific event-based project.

=== Solo exhibitions ===
Year	Title	Location
2015	Display Distribute: Made in Shenzhen	Display Distribute, Yau Ma Tei, Hong Kong
2014	Star Pupas	FLEETING LIGHTS Project, Lower Piazza, Hong Kong Science Museum, Hong Kong
2014	Made in Hong Kong	Osage Gallery, Hong Kong
2013	Don't Blame the Moon	Singapore Art Fair, Hong Kong AP Contemporary, Singapore
2012	Reality—Leung Mee-ping Installation Art Exhibition	OX Warehouse, Macau
2011	Made in Hong Kong	Pemalamo Gallery, Taipei, Taiwan
2010	Miniature Flat G, No 7	Giormani Home Gallery, Hong Kong
2006	Room with View	Centre de Reflexion sur I'image et Ses Contexts, Sierre, Switzerland
2004	In Search of Insomnious Sheep	Tai Mei Tuk Sea Activity Centre, 1a Space, Hong Kong
2004	Memorize the Future II	Exhibition Hall, Tsuen Wan City Hall, Hong Kong / Western Market, Sheung Wan, Hong Kong
2003	Hong Kong Contemporary—Water Tone: Leung Mee Ping 1992-2003	Kaoshsiung Fine Art Museum, Kaoshsiung, Taiwan
2002	Memorize the Future	Hong Kong City Hall, Hong Kong
2000	Close at a Distance	Lime Gallery, California Institute of the Arts, USA
1999	Memorize the Future	Main Gallery, California Institute of the Arts, USA
1998	A Poem without a Title	Para / Site Art Space, Hong Kong
1995	Beyond Hong Kong	Hong Kong Museum of Arts, Hong Kong
1994	Mon-Hair	Gallery Fringe, Hong Kong
1994	Mixed-media Works by Leung Mee Ping	Heineken Gallery, Hong Kong
1993	Liens	Galerie Catherine Flectcher, Paris, France
1991	Graduation Exhibition of Leung Mee Ping	L'Ecole Nationale Superieure des Beaux-Arts a Paris, France

=== Group exhibitions ===
Year	Title	Location
2022	Hong Kong: Here and Beyond	M+, Hong Kong
2021	Poetic Heritage	Tai Kwun Contemporary, Hong Kong
2021	New Horizons: Ways of Seeing Hong Kong Art in the 80s and 90s	Hong Kong Museum of Art, Hong Kong
2020	Hi! Flora, Fauna	Hong Kong Zoological and Botanical Gardens, Hong Kong
2020	Classics Remix: The Hong Kong Viewpoint	Hong Kong Museum of Art, Hong Kong
2019	Present Passing: South by Southeast	Osage Gallery, Hong Kong
2018	Collection of Terry, Debbie and Harry	Tai Kwun Contemporary, Hong Kong
2018	Land Art Mongolia 5th Biennial 2018 - WHO ARE WE NOW?	Mongolian National Modern Art Gallery, Ulaanbaatar, Mongolia
2018	Shenzhen Biennale 2018 - Open Source	LuoHu Art Museum, Shenzhen, China
2015	Shanghai Urban Space Art 2015 Season	West Bund Art Centre, Shanghai, China
2015	"ArtBat" Public Art Festival	Almaty, Kazakhstan
2015	Walking in the Dreams	Hong Kong Heritage Museum, Hong Kong
2015	Urban Exotic Dilemma	Koo Ming Kown Exhibition Gallery, Hong Kong
2015	Artspiration: About Light	Oil Street Art Space / HKICC, Lee Shau Kee School of Creativity, Hong Kong
2015	Art Basel － Hong Kong Osage Gallery	Hong Kong Conventional Center, Hong Kong
2014	Star Pupas	Lower Piazza, Hong Kong Science Museum, Hong Kong
2014	Delivering Poem	Chifra Art Park, Shuntak, East Coast, Guangdong, China
2014	Tighttrope Walking Fish	Shenzhen Public Sculpture Exhibition 2014, Shenzhen, China
2014	All are Guest — Home Coming	Hong Kong Museum of Art, Hong Kong
2014	FLEX IT! My Body My Temple Project	The Parthenon Museum, USA
2014	Unseen Presence	Irish Museum of Modern Art, Ireland
2014	Home	Fangsou Commune, Guangzhou, China
2014	Art Basel- Hong Kong Osage Gallery	Hong Kong Conventional Center, Hong Kong
2014	Elsewhere- Hong Kong Osage Gallery	Art Cologne, Germany
2014	Kanhaiya & Kumari---[en]counters 2014: Is There Love in The Air	Judith Beach, Mumbai, India
2014	One for One—The Free Marketeers	Hong Kong Cultural Centre, Hong Kong
2014	Journeys of Leung Ping-kwan' Exhibition (1949–2013)	Hong Kong Central Library, Hong Kong / Huashan 1914 Creative Park, Taiwan
2013	10th Busan International Video Art Festival	Openspace Bae, Busan, Korea
2013	Lost & Found	Z Space, Taichung, Taiwan
2013	All Are Guests—Hong Kong Week Exhibition	Husashan 1914 Creative Park, Taiwan
2013	Contemporary Hong Kong Art Biennial Exhibition	Hong Kong Museum of Art, Hong Kong
2013	Haein Art Project—International Exhibition of Contemporary Art	Sungbo Museum, Haeinsa Temple, South Korea
2013	Made in India ---[en]counters 2013: powerPLAY	Studio X, Mumbai, India
2012	Coin Making—Workshop	Free Space Fest, West Kowloon Culture District, Hong Kong
2012	Of Human Scale: Art and Environment	The Hong Kong Art Centre, Hong Kong
2012	Philosopher's (knock-off) Stone: Turning Gold into Plastic	Osage Gallery, Hong Kong
2012	All are Guests - Liverpool Biennial	LJMU Copperas Hill Building, Liverpool, England
2012	Inwards Gazes—Documentaries of Chinese Performance Art	Museu de Arts de Macau, Macau
2012	LOUD: Mapping the Aesthetics of Visual Silence	The Visual Festival Fringe, Kassel, Germany
2012	Market Force	Osage Gallery, Hong Kong
2012	Mobile M+ YAU MA TEI	M+ (Museum of Visual Culture, WKCD) Hong Kong
2010	Each Other	Pemalamo Gallery, Taipei, Taiwan
2010	Videoholica -International Video Art Festival	Varna, Bulgaria
2010	Prelude	CVA Exhibition Hall, Hong Kong Baptist University, Hong Kong
2010	Convection	Dafen Museum of Art, Shenzhen, China
2010	Home Stay	Osage Shanghai Gallery, Shanghai, China
2010	Art of the World Exposition: The City of Forking Paths	Shanghai Art Expo Main Path, Shanghai, China
2010	Lending Art Work Project	Shanghai Street Art Space, Hong Kong
2010	Arrivals and Departures	Urbis, Manchester, UK
2003	Mapping Asia -- The 18th Asian International Art Exhibition	Hong Kong Heritage Museum, Hong Kong
2003	Re-appearance of OTsing Fsou Choi?	Learning Centre Galleries, Noh Kong Art Centre, Hong Kong
2003	OCEM project	West Space, Melbourne, Australia
2003	Moving On	NUS Museum, National University of Singapore
2003	Sharjah International Biennial	Sharjah Museum of Art, Sharjah, U .A .E

== Awards ==
Year	Awards
2015	Hong Kong Best Annual Artist Award Hong Kong art Development Council
2014	IMMA Fellowship Irish Museum of Modern Art, Ireland
2013	President's Award for Outstanding Performance in Scholarly Work (Service). HKBU
2012	Artist Residency Slade School of Fine Art, University College London, Britain
2011	President's Award for Outstanding Performance in Scholarly Work (Creative / Professional Work) HKBU.
2010	Outstanding Artists of 2010: Martell –NDmedia Art Salon. Martell Art Foundation in China
2009	Daily Permanent Public Sculpture, National Museum Southern Branch, Chiayi Prince Boulevard, Taiwan
2008	Civitella Ranieri Fellowship Civitella Ranieri Foundation, Italy
2007	Two Sites Permanent Art in Public, Zhang Jiang High Technology Park, Shanghai, China
2004	Freeman Foundation Fellowship Freeman Foundation, USA
2003	Starr Foundation Fellowship offered by Asian Cultural Council, USA
2002	Hong Kong Contemporary Art Biennial Award

== Notable works ==
=== Elsewhere (1991–2002) ===
Initiated by a close friend's passing, Leung began collecting tea bags to create Elsewhere in 1991. Elsewhere is mixed media installation consisting of thousands of tea bags sewn together. Made through the repetitive action of sewing teabags, Leung's work is meditative contemplation on being and death. In 1991, Leung won the Premier prix Rocheron Award for this work.

=== Memorise the Future (1998–2006) ===
Memorise the Future (1998-2006), first shown at the Hong Kong Museum of Art, is an installation composed of 3,000 children shoes made of human hair (4 to 5 inches for each). Leung collected the hair from over 10,000 people, encompassing one hundred nations, various demographics, also symbolising disparate and diverse 'memories'. She then mixed, knit and wove the collected hair, blurring geographical boundaries and identities. The shoes themselves also carry meaning, pointing towards the future.

=== Out of place (2005–2011) ===
Out of place (2005-2011) is a series of video installation which feature different places (including Hong Kong, Shenzhen, Taipei, Beijing, Shanghai, Sri Lanka and Macau). Leung followed a number of individuals wondering aimlessly through the streets of varying locales, attempting to discover new psychogeographical routes through the mapping of purposeless.

=== I Miss Fanta (2012) ===
I Miss Fanta was presented as part of Mobile M+: Yau Ma Tei, a series of nomadic pre-opening exhibitions organised by M+. I Miss Fanta consists of three iconic outdoor neon signs of Coca-Cola, Fanta, and Sprite previously installed along Macau's main shopping artery Avenida de Almeida Ribeiro, where they were an integral and memorable part of the urban visual landscape. After Leung discovered that two of the signs, had recently been removed, she found and transplanted the signs in this work, re-lighting the neon in the process. She displayed them on the ground of the park in Yau Ma Tei, echoing how they were found on the platform in the Coca-Cola factory in Macau, and documented the move in videos shown in a nearby junk and recycling shop. Leung transforms all these visual symbols related to personal and collective memory into a sculptural installation, bringing the tension between heritage conservation and urban gentrification to the surface as well.

=== Star Pupas (2014) ===
In 2014, Leung enrolled in Fleeting Light, a large scale media arts exhibition presented by The Hong Kong Arts Development Council. The exhibition was held outside Hong Kong Science Museum during 14 September to 28 September 2014.

For this exhibition, Leung designed a mobile app called Star Pupas where visitors could scan images of stars in the sky, "name" said stars and leave messages for friends. The images and the messages were then projected onto a dome-shaped tent. The more stars that are shared, the more light there will be in the tent. Leung aimed to claim back starlight, which is often obscured by light pollution in urban cities, and also to invite visitors to 'look up' away from their smartphones, not only to the sky but also to the community around them.

=== Pearl River Delta Series I: Made in Hong Kong (2014) ===
Leung Mee Ping's Pearl River Delta Series I: Made in Hong Kong was a mixed-media installation investigating the relationships between cities in the Pearl River Delta—Hong Kong, Shenzhen and Macau. In particular, Leung was curious about the souvenir painting trade, which had recently moved from Hong Kong to Shenzhen. Leung herself went to Dafen to apprentice herself as a trainee to learn about the rapid painting production. She then commissioned a number of paintings of various Hong Kong scenes, which were created sometimes by herself or by other trainees. She signed each of the paintings, no matter who had created them. Leung questions ideas of origin, identity, gaze and ownership in this installation as viewers are invited to look on a set of souvenir paintings depicting mundane, everyday scenes in Hong Kong.
