= Phoebe Man =

Hong Kong artist

Phoebe Ching Ying Man
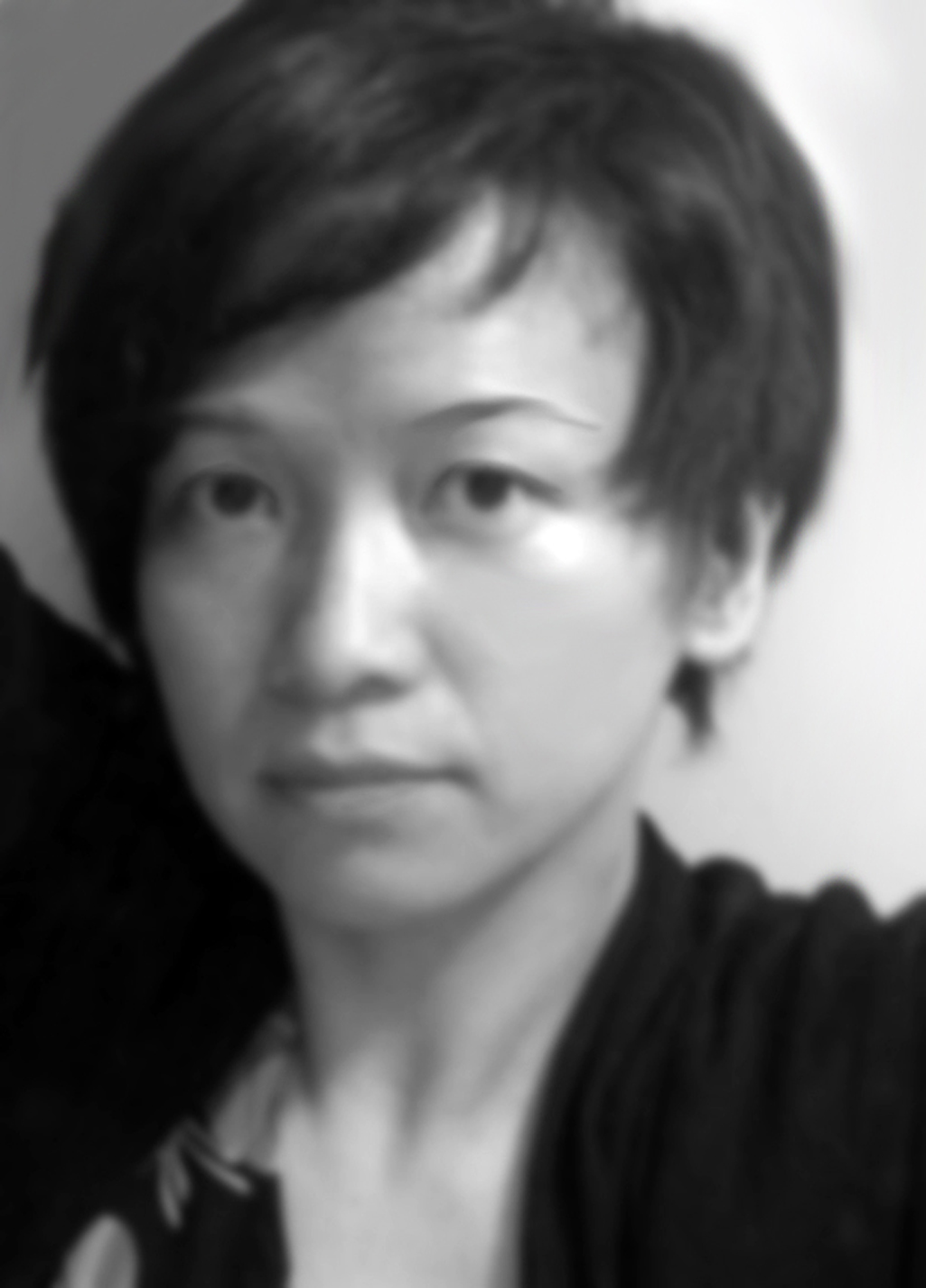
- Born: 1969 (age 56–57); Hong Kong
- Education: BA, Chinese University of Hong Kong; MFA, San Francisco Art Institute; DFA, Royal Melbourne Institute of Technology
- Known for: Feminist art

Phoebe Man (Man, Ching Ying) (Chinese: 文晶瑩) (born 1969 in Hong Kong) is a conceptual artist, media sculptor and independent curator based in Hong Kong. Her works have been shown in local and international art exhibitions, including Venice Biennale, Shanghai Biennale, Gwangju Biennale, and European Media Art Festival. Her works were included in Asian Art, The Art of Modern China and Hong Kong Eye: Hong Kong Contemporary Art.

== Early life and education ==
Man studied at the Chinese University of Hong Kong from 1987 to 1991, where she majored in Fine Arts. She received her master's degree in Fine Arts (New Genres Major) from San Francisco Art Institute in 2000. She pursued and received her DFA in the Royal Melbourne Institute of Technology in 2012.

== Career ==
Phoebe Man
- Traditional Chinese: 文晶瑩
- Simplified Chinese: 文晶莹
Transcriptions
Standard Mandarin
- Hanyu Pinyin: Wén Jīngyíng
Yue: Cantonese
- Jyutping: man4 zing1 jing4

Man is Associate Professor in the School of Creative Media at City University of Hong Kong. She is also the Advisor (Education) and Grant Examiner of Hong Kong Arts Development Council.

Her multi-media works explore the relationships between art history and the audience. Pursuing a cross-disciplinary practice, Man uses different mediums, including sculpture, installation, performance, video art and web art. Man develops a series of artworks concerning the sexual violence issue with profound background research. Although much of her work can be read through a feminist perspective, she contends that her work “is never an illustration of feminist theory”. She wishes to have "more room for imagination" and "take the position of a human being rather than a feminist" when she works.

She also works as a curator and often organizes shows to promote Hong Kong art. She served as the director of Asian Experimental Video Festival in Hong Kong, the guest curator of a number of local and international experimental video festivals, and is one of the co-founders of Para/Site Art Space.

== Awards and accomplishments ==
Man's video work "Rati" won the Hong Kong Independent Short Film & Video Award and was invited to show in more than 30 festivals and art events in Brazil, France, Norway, Netherlands and Germany from 2000 to 2019. She received a fellowship from the Asian Cultural Council and the Urban Council Fine Arts Award from the Hong Kong Museum of Art in 1998. She was also selected as one of the ten "Smart Women of the 21st Century" by Marie Claire in the same year. She has received a number of grants from the University Grants Committee and Hong Kong Arts Development Council.

== Artworks ==
- "Phoebe Man's Augmented Reality public art: "How are you?" and "A" (2018)
- "Birthday Cakes" (2015)
- "Love China Love Hong Kong Thick Toast" (2015)
- "One Pyeong of Golden Bricks" (2015)
- "Erosion of Home" (2014-15)
- "If I Were" (2014-5)
- "One Person One Heart" (2014)
- "Touch the Moon" (2014)
- "Home Sweet Home" (2012)
- "Rewriting History" (2010)
- Washing the Light (2003)
- "Rati" (2000-01)
- "Orange" (1997)
- "Beautiful Flowers" (1996)
- "A Present For Her Growth" (1996)
- "Rice Bed" (1994)
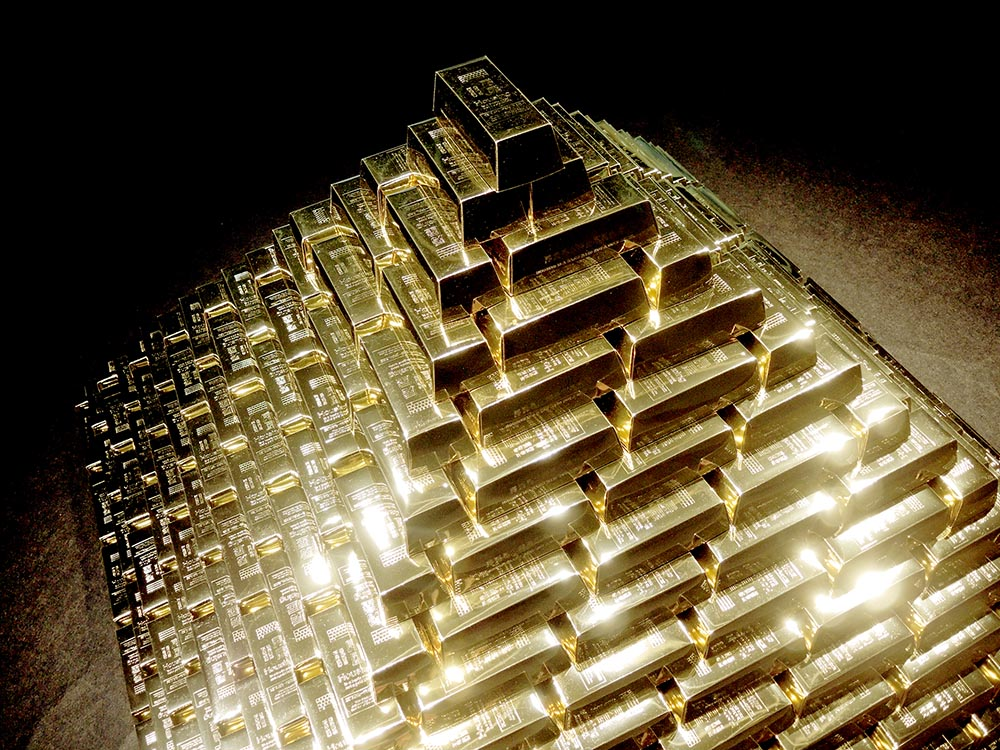
One Pyeong of Golden Bricks (2015) An artwork reflects housing problem in Hong Kong and Taiwan.

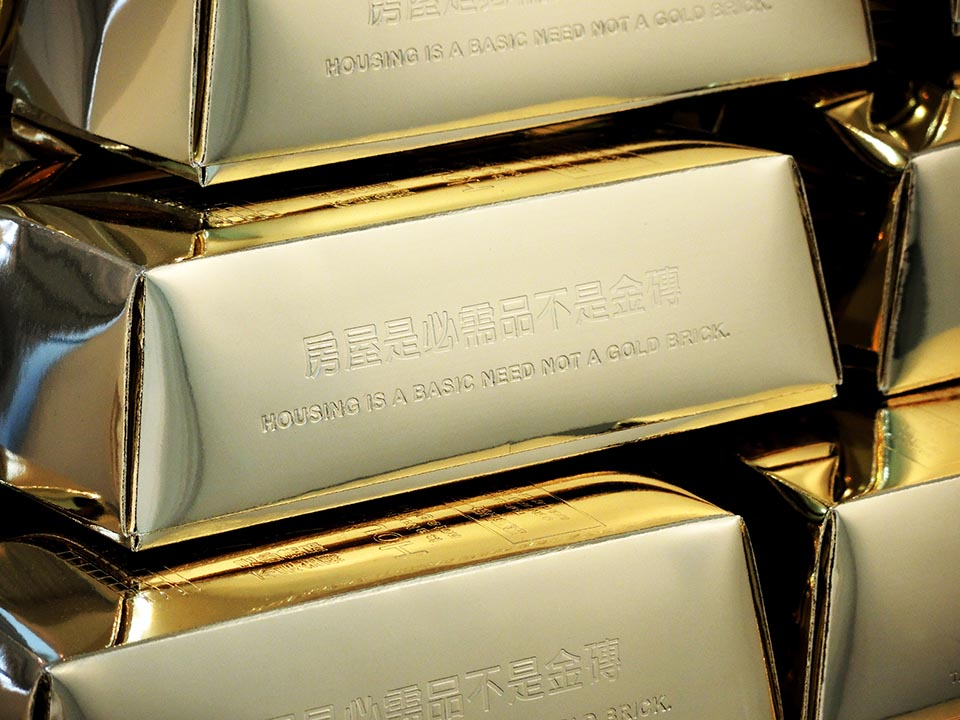
One Pyeong of Golden Bricks (2015) Man believes "Housing is a basic need not a gold brick." Inside each brick, there is a bag of rice. The bricks were distributed to the audience at the end of the exhibition in order to convey Man 's idea to different family.

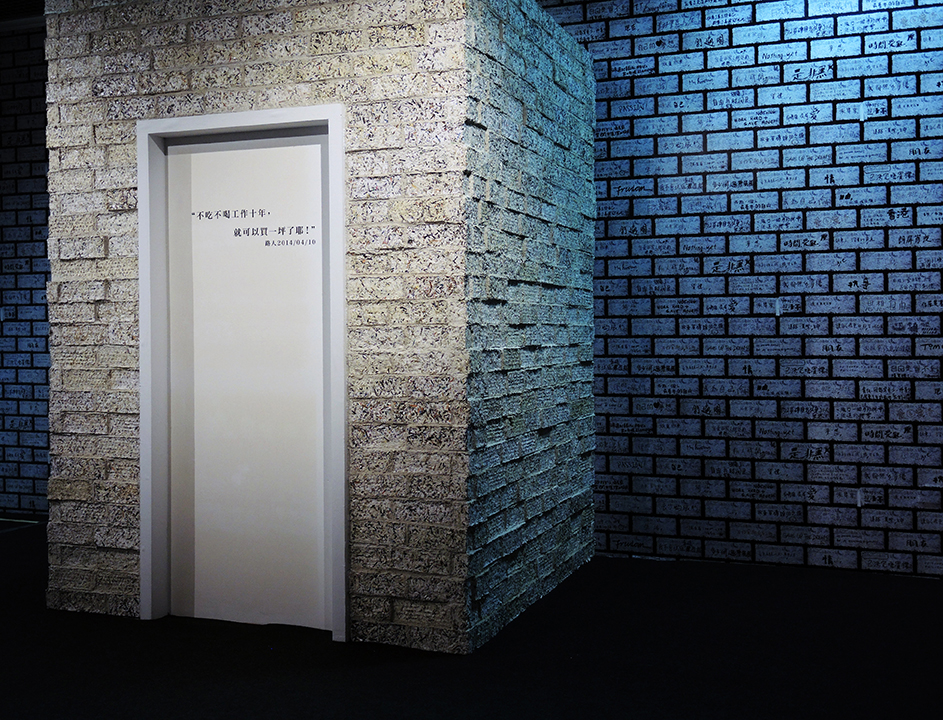
Erosion of Home (2015) Another artwork shows the living problem caused by soaring property price in Hong Kong and Taiwan.

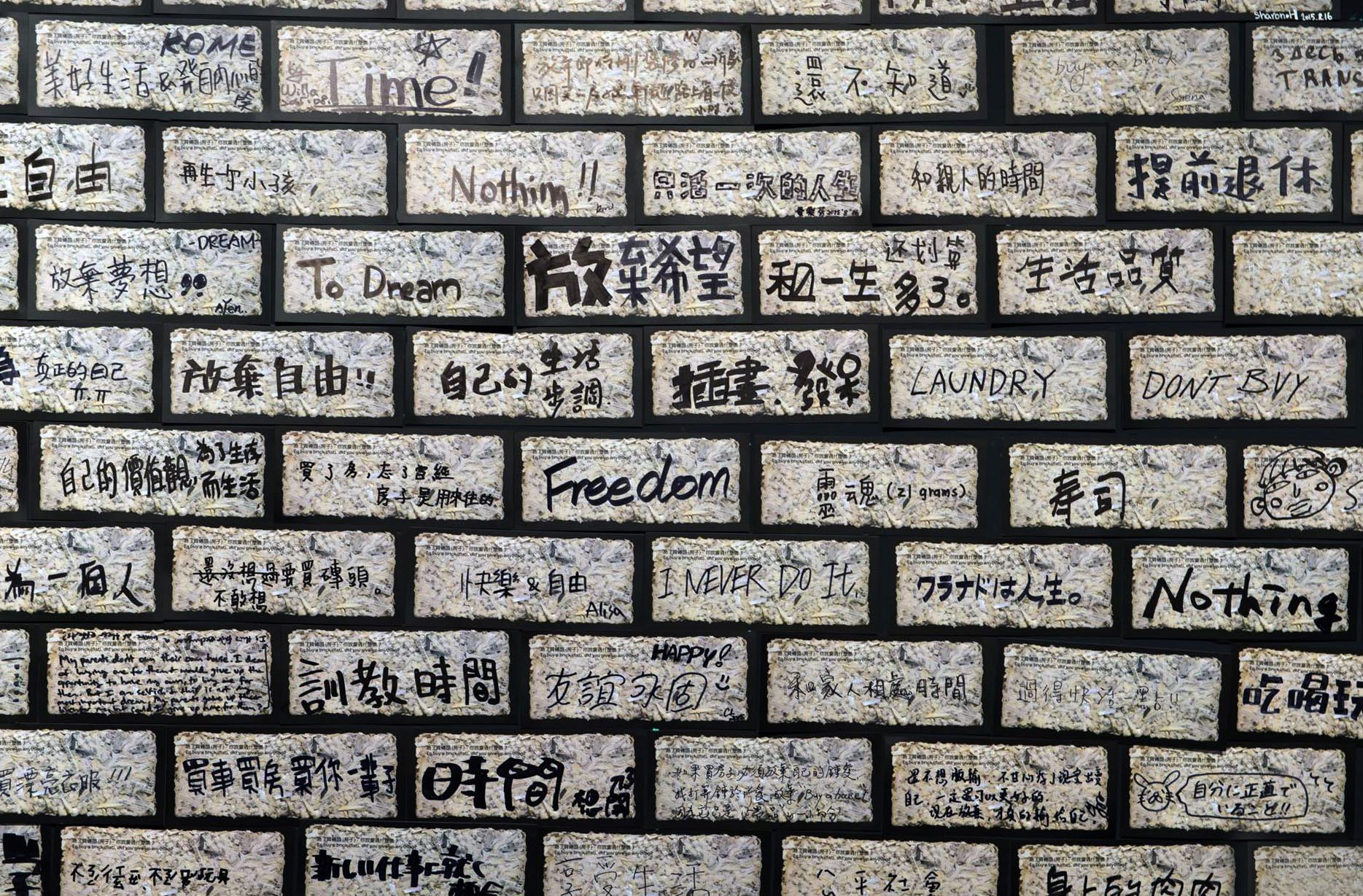
Erosion of Home "Did you give up anything to buy a flat?" (2015) The audience can participate in the creation process by answering Man's question and sticking the paper on the wall for interaction.

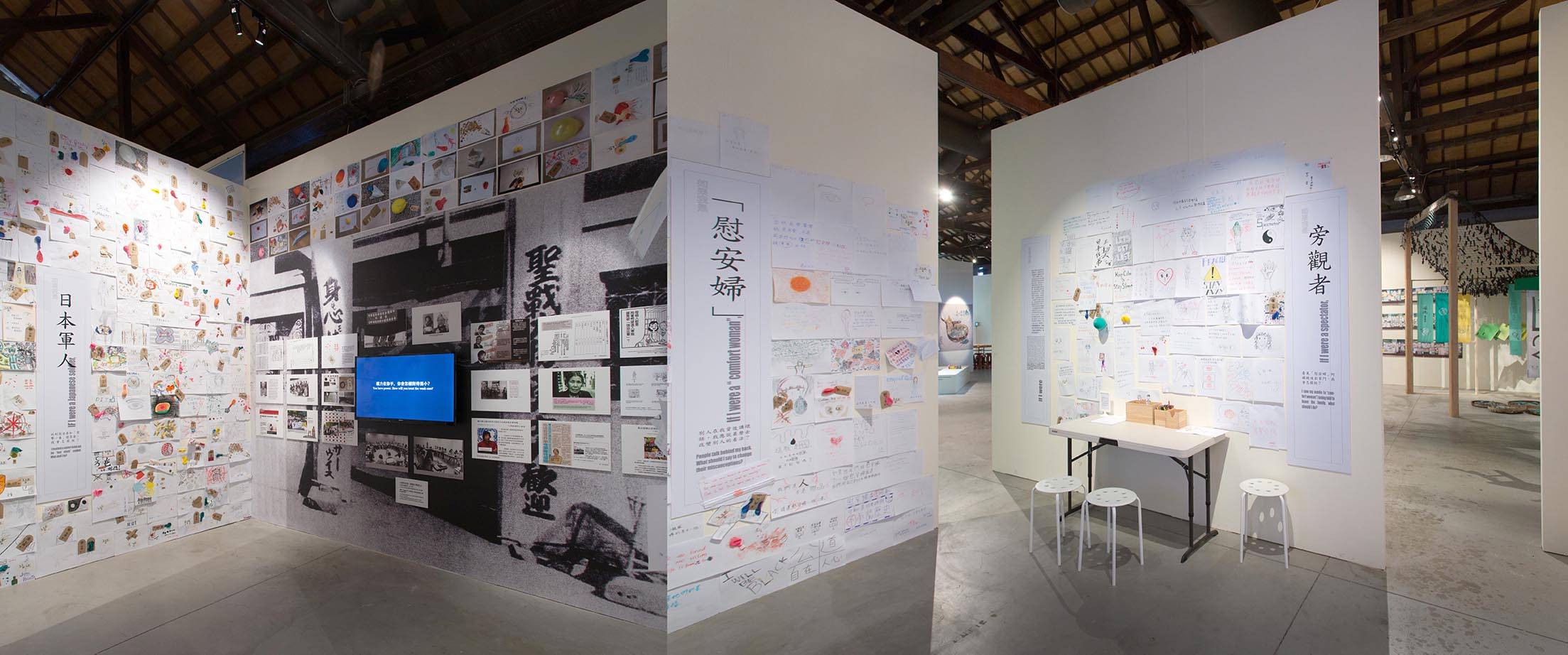
If I Were (2014) It is an artwork related to sexual violence issues in the war. Man would like to engage audience ’s participation in her work to encourage discussion and to explore if empathy can be developed during wartime.

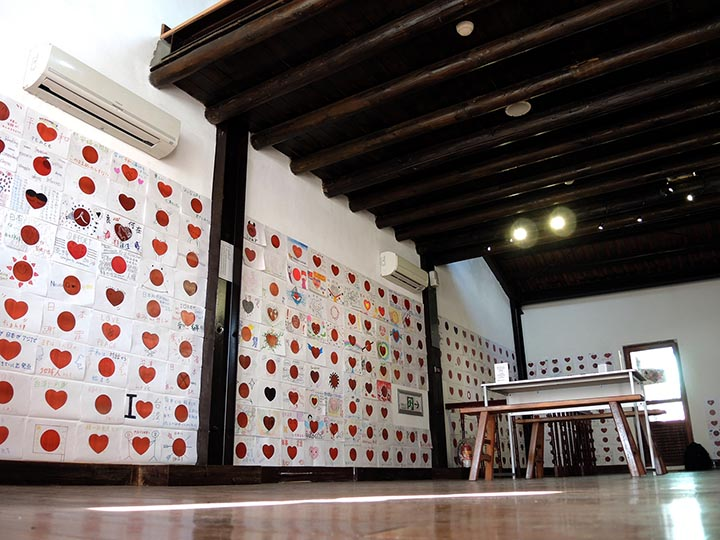
One Person One Heart (2014) A socially-engaged art against sexual slavery in World War II which concerns about the issue of comfort women.

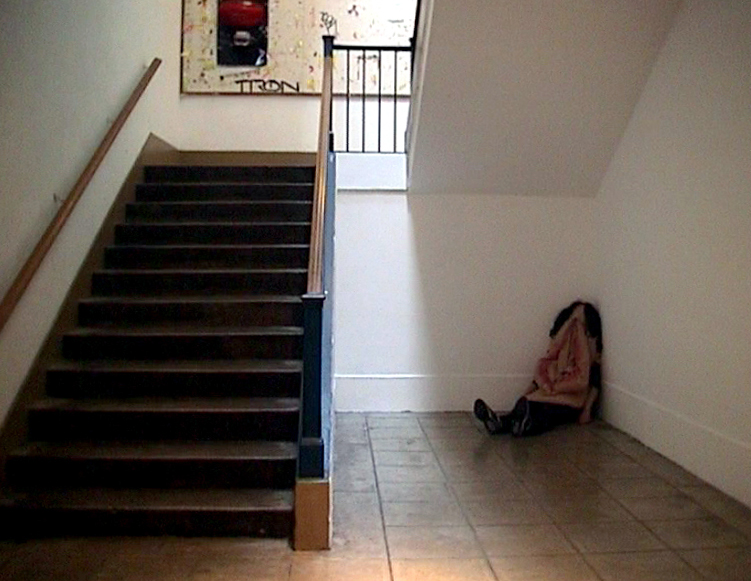
Rati by Phoebe Man (2001) Inspired by the body presentation of people in the chatroom, Man questioned "are women just pieces of meat?". In order to answer the question, she created a walking vagina, Rati. Audience could see Rati 's daily life in the video and tried to explore the question.

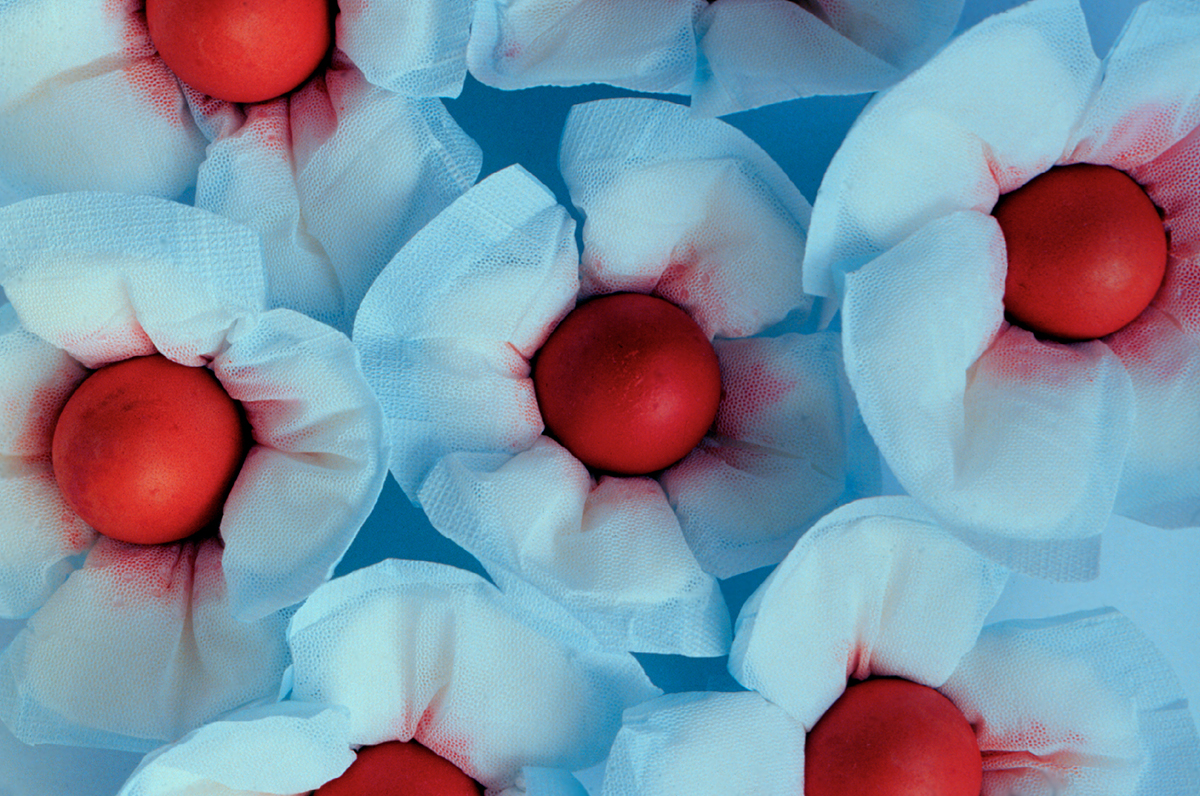
A Present For her Growth 1 (1996) “The artwork is about the burden of female — menstruation and pregnancy.” Roger Lee commented that this series of artwork “can be read as an essentialist feminist work and at the same time a play of feminism…the flowered chair becomes a personification of the presence of women in Hong Kong society and is art world”
