= Wong Chi Hang Sara =

Wong Chi Hang Sara (黃志恆; born 1968) is a Hong Kong–based visual artist and landscape architect. Wong graduated with a BA degree in Fine Arts from the Chinese University of Hong Kong in 1992 and an MA in Landscape Architecture from the University of Hong Kong.

Wong was born in Hong Kong. She was one of the founding members of Para Site, a Hong Kong gallery and organisation dedicated to contemporary art forms which opened in 1996. She is part of the Fotanian artists studio community at Fo Tan in Hong Kong. Her work brings together the fields of architecture and art, addressing the ways people move through spaces by creating large sculptural forms. Wong works alone and collaboratively with artists including as Leung Chi Wo Warren on socially engaged art projects such as City Cookie (1999-2003)

Wong's exhibitions include: Shanghai Biennale (2000), 50th Venice Biennale (2001), Gwangju (2002).

== Public collections ==
- Kardist Art Foundation
- Hong Kong Heritage Museum, Hong Kong, China

== Awards ==
- Artist Grant of the Centre de Reflexion sur l'Image et ses Contextes, Switzerland (2000);
- Most Promising Artist of the Philippe Charriol Foundation, Hong Kong (1994);
- Ramon Woon Art Creative Prize, The Chinese University of Hong Kong (1992).

== Artist-in-residence ==
- PS1 Contemporary Art Center, New York (1999),
- The Bronx Museum of the Arts (2000), New York;
- Ecole Cantonale d'Art du Valais (ECAV), Sierre, Switzerland (2000)
- the Nordisk Kunstnarsenter Dalssesen, Norway (2002).

== Solo exhibitions ==
- "City Cookie (collaboration with Leung Chi Wo)", Vitrines, Gallery 44, Toronto, Canada (2003)
- "Have a Slice of…", Para/Site Central at Hanart TZ Gallery, Hong Kong, China (2001)
- "City Cookie (collaboration with Leung Chi Wo)", Hong Kong Visual Arts Centre, Hong Kong, China (2001)
- "1:100 1:500 1:1000", Shanghai Street Art Space, Hong Kong, China (2001)
- "Al Gore", Sound Art Project in the train station in Sierre, Switzerland (2000)
- "Local Orientation: Video Installation by Sara Wong", Para/Site Art Space, Hong Kong, China (1998)

== Group exhibitions ==
- "Metropolis Strip(p)ed", The Substation, Singapore (2005)
- "Fridge", Pao's Gallery, Hong Kong Art Centre, Hong Kong, China (2004)
- "Id-map, Real-scpe", Tezz Gallery, Tokyo, Japan (2004)
- "Para/Site: Open Work", Centre of Contemporary Chinese Art, Vancouver, Canada (2004)
- "Navigating the Dot", 50th Venice Biennale, Venice, Italy (2003)
- "Local Accent: 12 artists from Hong Kong", Pickled Art Centre, Beijing, China (2003)
- "Art, plastics, and Recycling", Potsdamer Platz subway station (U3), Berlin, Germany (2002)
- "Street Life Film Festival", Sox 36, Berlin, Germany (2002)
- "Videominuto 2002", Luigi Pecci Centre for Contemporary Art, Prato, Italy (2002)
- "Moving Violation", Red Dog Gallery, Hong Kong, China (2002)
- Gwangju Biennale 2002, Gwangju, South Korea (2002)
- "Social Club", Para/Site Art Space, Hong Kong, China (2002)
- "Wo-Man", Old Lady,'s House, Macau, China (2001)
- Contemporary Hong Kong Art Biennial, Hong Kong Museum of Art, Hong Kong, China (2001)
- 49th Venice Biennale, Venice, Italy (2001)
- "Migration (part of the Next Wave Festival), " West Space, Melbourne, Australia (2001)
- "Hot Pot: Exhibition of Contemporary Chinese Art", Kunstnernes Hus, Oslo, Norway (2001)
- "Shanghai Biennale, Shanghai Art Museum, Shanghai, China (2000)
- "berlin in Hong Kong", Tama Site, Hong Kong, China (2000)
- "Double Space", Young-Un Museum of Contemporary Art, South Korea (2000)
- "One Day on the Beach (performance and exhibition)", PS1 Contemporary Art Centre, New York, USA (2000)
- "Clockwork 2000", Clockwork Gallery of PS1 Contemporary Art Center, New York, USA (2000)
- "Artist in the Marketplace", Bronx Museum of the Arts", New York, USA (2000)
- "Queens Focus 1", Queens Museum of Art, New York, USA (2000)
- "Festival of Vision 2000: Hong Kong/Berlin", Haus der Kulturen der Welt (House of the World Culture), Berlin, Germany (2000)
- "Women of the World", White Columns, New York, USA; Flint Institute of Arts, Michigan, USA; Volvo Showroom, Stockholm, Germany (2000)
- "The Free Tribe", Hong Kong Arts Centre, Hong Kong, China (2000)
- "ARTscope Hong Kong 2000, Morphe 2000, Tokyo", Gallery of the City University of Hong Kong, Hong Kong, China (2000)
- "7th International Shoebox Exhibition", University of Hawaii Art Gallery, Honolulu, Hawaii (2000)
- "Shaufenster In pie Welt (Show Window to the World)", Showcase in Public Space Project, Kassel, Germany (1999)
- "Home Affairs", Sam Tung Uk Museum, Hong Kong, China (1999)
- "Home: In Exploration of Home and City", Para/Site, Hong Kong, China (1999)
- "Festival Now '98: Monument of Unknown", Hong Kong Arts Center, Hong Kong, China (1998)
- "Coffee Shop", Para/Site, Hong King, China (1998)
- "Junge Kunst aus Hongkong (Contemporary Art and Culture of Hong Kong)", co-organized by the Goethe Institute and Muffriatle, Munich, Germany (1997)
- "Hyperplace", Virtual Design Project on the Internet (1997)
- "Site-Seeing: Installation by Sara Wong and Phoebe Man", Para/Site, Hong Kong, China (1996)
- "Autour de Roger Vivier", (curated by Galerie Enrico Navara, Paris) The China Club, Hong Kong, China (1996)
- "Shirt Art Exhibition", Art Gallery of Elite Bookstore, Taipei, Taiwan (1996)
- "Cheap (but good) Art", Hong Kong Arts Centre, Hong Kong, China (1996)
- "Ac.cul.tu.ra.tion: Art in Time of Change", Hong Kong City Hall, Hong Kong, China (1995)
- "HK/SYD/HK: An Exhibition of Hong Kong and Sydney Artists", Fringe Club, Hong Kong, China (1995)
- "Black Box Exercise III: an exhibition of installation art", Hong Kong University of Science and Technology, Hong Kong, China (1995)
- "Space in Transition", Hong Kong Arts Centre (1995)
- "Off the Wall", Club 64, Hong Kong, China (1995)
- "The Box Show", Heineken Gallery: The Fringe Club, Hong Kong, China (1994)
- "4 Sides, 4 Spheres – starting from sketches…", Heineken Gallery: The Fringe Club, Hong Kong, China (1994)
- The Exhibition of Finalists' Works in the Modern Art Competition, Philippe Charriol Foundation, Ocean Terminal and Hong Kong Landmark, Hong Kong, China (1994)
- "Sheun Wan – Behind the Horizon", Exhibition Hall, Sheung Wan Civic Centre, Hong Kong, China (1994)
- "AHmen!", Art Gallery, First Institute of Art and Design, Hong Kong, China (1994)
- "Material → Material, Art Gallery, Design First Institute of Art and Design, Hong Kong, China (1993)
- The Exhibition of Finalists' Works in the Modern Art Competition, Philippe Charriol Foundation, Ocean Terminal and Hong Kong Visual Art Centre, Hong Kong, China (1993)
- "Infinity", Dept. of Fine Arts Gallery, University of Hong Kong, Hong Kong, China (1993)
- "Manulife Young Artists Series '92", Pao's Gallery, Hong Kong Art Centre, Hong Kong, China (1992)
- "SHUN SHI DONG XI", Pao's Gallery, Hong Kong Art Centre, Hong Kong, China (1992)
- "The Juiner Exhibition", Andison Gallery, Virginia Commonwealth University, Virginia, USA (1991)

Documentation of her works can be found in the Hong Kong Art Archive
