= Osage Gallery =

Contemporary art gallery in Kwun Tong, Hong Kong

- 奧沙畫廊
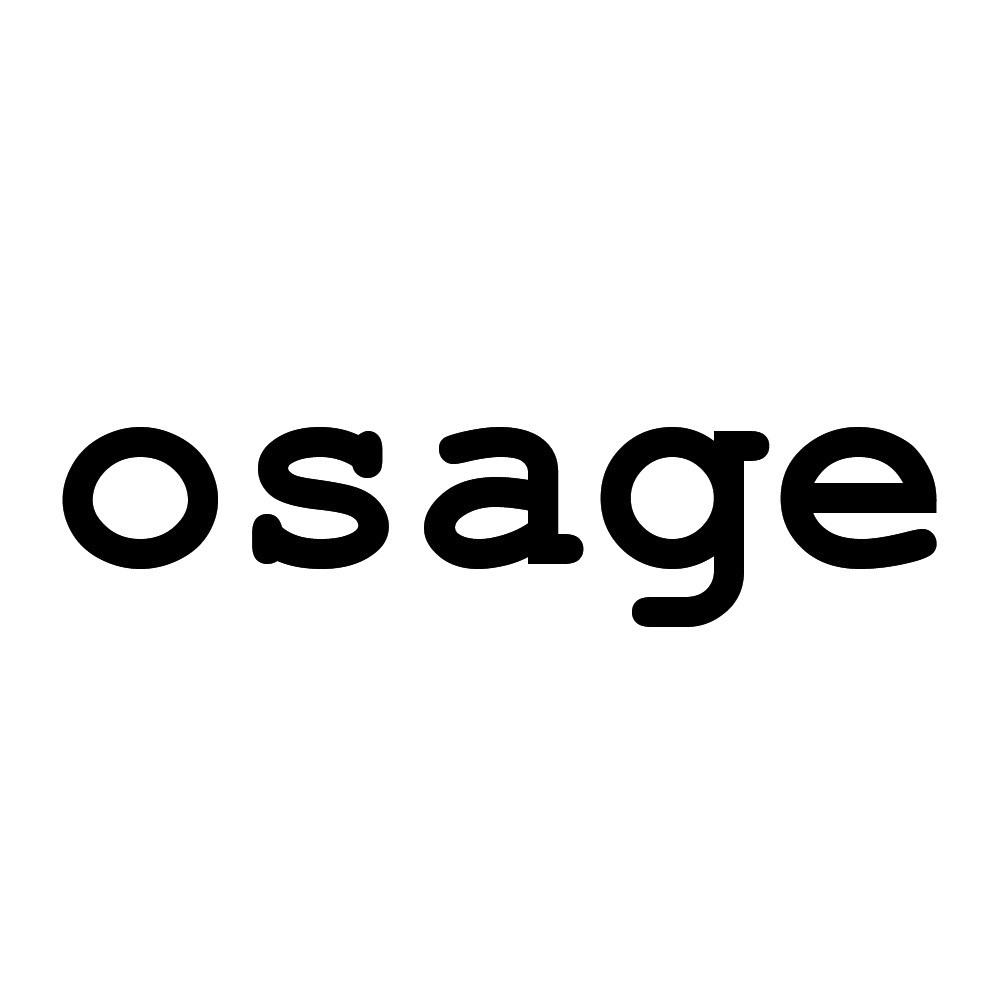
- Established: 2004
- Location: Unit A, 1/F, King Yip Factory Building, 59 King Yip St, Kwun Tong, Hong Kong
- Director: Agnes Lin
- Website: http://osagegallery.com

Osage Gallery (Chinese: 奧沙畫廊) is a contemporary art gallery located in Hong Kong.

Osage Gallery was founded in 2004, and has since established itself as a major interdisciplinary platform for Asian and international contemporary art. Osage has organized solo exhibitions by artists such as Miao Xiaochun, Sun Yuan & Peng Yu, Leung Mee Ping, Maurice Benayoun, Nipan Oranniwesna, and Masaki Fujihata, as well as notable group exhibitions. It has become best known in the art world for exhibiting dramatic installations and performance artworks, often with challenging and critical subject matters. Osage Gallery has hosted art fairs such as Art Basel, where it was the first Hong Kong gallery to be featured. Since its establishment in Hong Kong, Osage has opened satellite galleries in Shanghai, Beijing, and Singapore.

The organization is currently headed by Founder and Director, Agnes Lin.

== History ==
Osage Gallery was founded by Agnes Lin in 2004 in SoHo, Hong Kong. In 2005, Osage expanded into Mainland China, opening two venues in Beijing - a two-storey gallery in a converted wine factory in the Chaoyang District, and an artists' studio in Suojiacun. In 2007, it opened galleries in Shanghai in a former 1920s mansion, and in Singapore in an iconic former mission school. In 2009, Osage Gallery launched a platform called Sigma Projects which explored interdisciplinary art projects, combining music, dance, performance and film works. Osage relocated its main exhibition space in 2013, to its present-day location in the Union Hing Yip Factory Building in Kwun Tong, Kowloon.

Osage was the first Hong Kong gallery to feature in Art Basel in 2011, the Spotlight section at Frieze Art Fair's Frieze Masters in 2012, Arte Fiera in 2014, Art Cologne in 2014. It was one of the first Hong Kong galleries to participate in the Museum of the Moving Image in New York in 2014. Osage has participated in Art Hong Kong from 2008 – 2012 and in Art Basel from 2013 – 2016. Art Basel's Magnus Renfrew noted that "Osage [has] strong programming that [is] different from the purely commercial objectives of the city’s [other] galleries".

== HKACT! ==
In 2015, Osage Gallery announced a new platform called HKACT! (Hong Kong Art Culture and Technological Innovation). HKACT! showcases artworks that utilize new media, such as virtual reality, augmented reality, and other emerging technologies.

Notable exhibitions featured in the HKACT! programme include BeHere, a large-scale public augmented reality installation by Masaki Fujihata, Kowloon Forest (Chinese: 靜影九龍), a virtual reality film and solo exhibition by Alexey Marfin, and WYSIWYG, a solo exhibition by Jeffrey Shaw. HKACT! has also chaired events such as a public symposium with Siegfried Zielinski, Yuk Hui and Scott Lash, on the topic of interactive arts, and the expanded field between arts, sciences and technologies (HKACT! Act 4).

== Osage Art Foundation ==
Osage Art Foundation (Chinese: 奧沙藝術基金) is Osage's not-for-profit arts development organization and production company, founded in 2004. It is a registered charity in Hong Kong, which raises funds to provide support for art projects, ranging from experimental performances and installations, to art education workshops and outreach programs.

The foundation has helped to introduce a number of contemporary Asian artists to the wider international art world, such as the Philippine artist Roberto Chabet (1937 - 2013).
