= Para Site =

Art space in Hong Kong

- 藝術空間
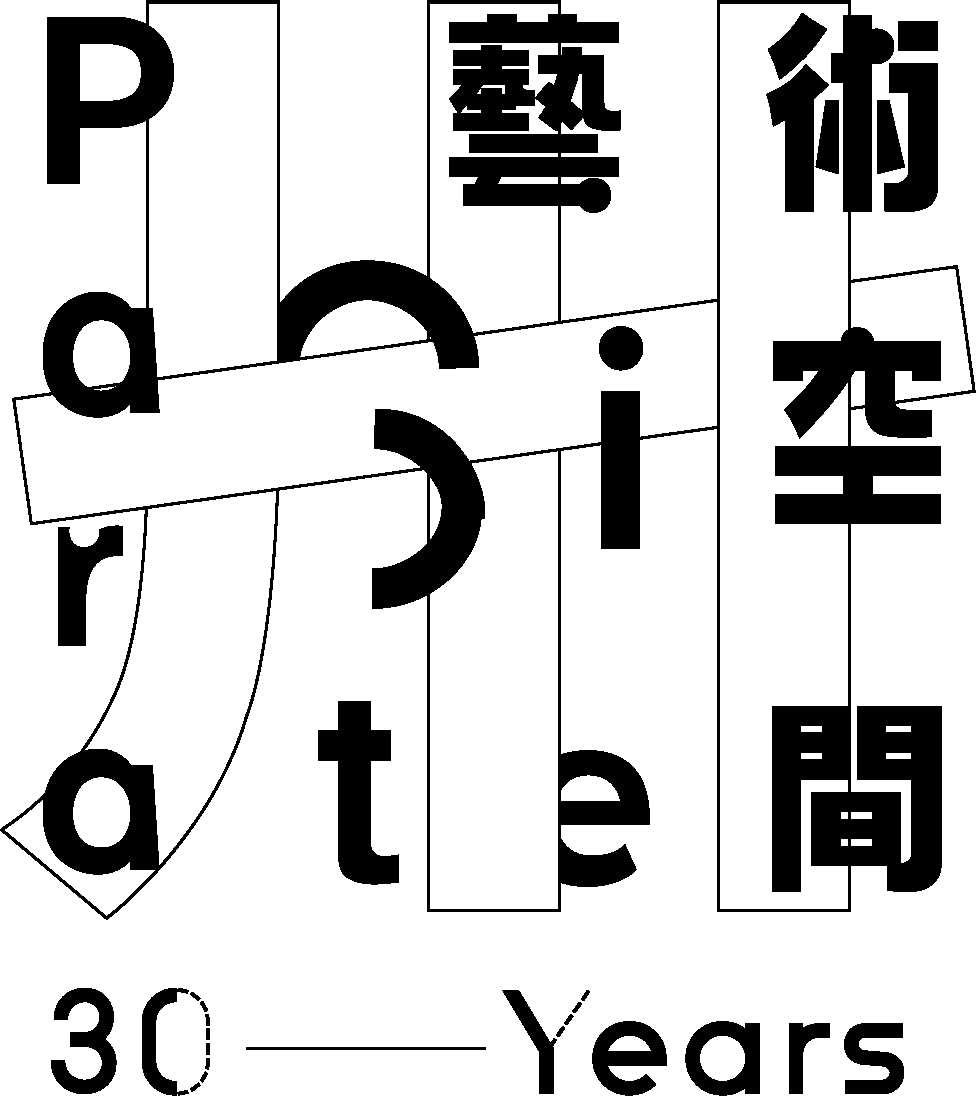
- Established: 1996
- Location: 22/F, Wing Wah Industrial Building, 677 King’s Road, Quarry Bay, Hong Kong
- Type: Independent non-profit
- Founders: Patrick Lee, Leung Chi-wo, Phoebe Man Ching-ying, Sara Wong Chi-hang, Leung Mee-ping, Tsang Tak-ping, Lisa Cheung
- Executive director: James Taylor-Foster
- Chairperson: Alan Lo
- Website: http://www.para-site.art

Para Site (Chinese: 藝術空間) is an independent, non-profit art space based in Hong Kong. It was founded in 1996 by artists Patrick Lee, Leung Chi-wo, Phoebe Man Ching-ying, Sara Wong Chi-hang, Leung Mee-ping, Tsang Tak-ping and Lisa Cheung. It produces exhibitions, public programmes, residencies, conferences and educational initiatives that aim to develop a critical understanding of local and international contemporary art.

Founders of Para Site (from left to right) Patrick Lee, Leung Chi-wo, Phoebe Man Ching-ying, Sara Wong Chi-hang, Leung Mee-ping, Tsang Tak-ping (not pictured: Lisa Cheung)

As Hong Kong’s first artist-run art space, it has helped bring recognition to local artists. It has since grown into a site of international relevance with a reputation for cutting-edge programming for the visual arts.

== History ==
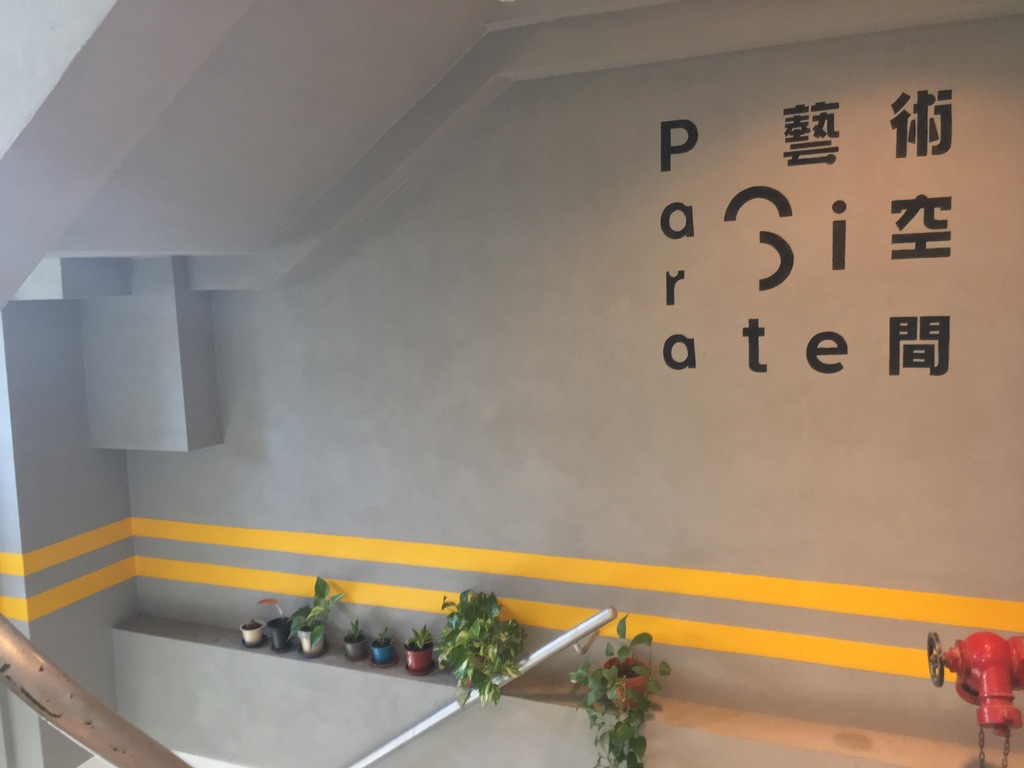
Entrance to the art space in Quarry Bay

Para Site was first founded in Kennedy Town in 1996. It moved to a 500-sq-ft space in Po Yan Street, Sheung Wan in 1997. In March 2015, it relocated to its current premises in North Point, a neighbourhood which had previously been a refugee camp and gathering place for mainland Chinese from the 1930s to late 1940s.

The move facilitated an expansion of Para Site’s programs with upgraded exhibition amenities, such as a room dedicated to education projects. Tobias Berger, curator at M+ and Executive Director of Para Site at the time, said that the move represented ‘a big step forward for the non-profit sector’.

== Exhibitions ==
Para Site produces 8-10 exhibitions a year, engaging local and international artists and curators. These are accompanied by regular talks, screenings, performances, and guided tours.

=== Recent exhibitions ===
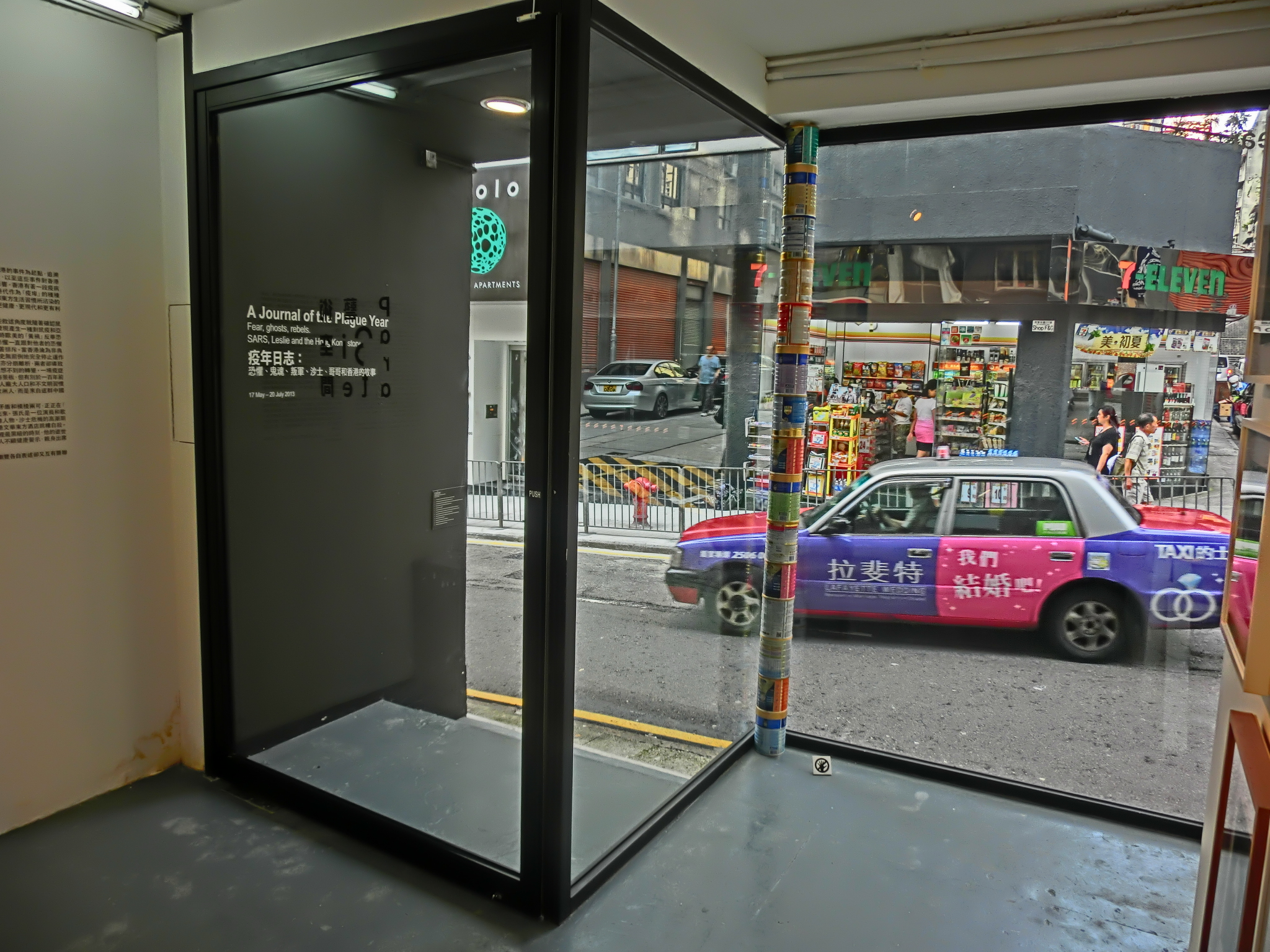
A Journal of the Plague Year at Para/Site Art Space, Sheung Wan in 2013

- Koloa: Women, Art, and Technology, 2019-2020
- Café do Brasil, 2019
- Bicycle Thieves, 2019
- An Opera for Animals, 2019
- Ellen Pau: What about Home Affairs? - A Retrospective, 2018-2019
- Crush, 2018
- KOTODAMA, 2018
- A beast, a god, and a line, 2018
- Chris Evans, Pak Sheung Chuen: Two Exhibitions, 2017
- Soils and Stones, Souls and Songs, 2017
- In Search of Miss Ruthless, 2017
- That Has Been, and May Be Again, 2016
- Afterwork, 2016
- The world is our home. A poem on abstraction, 2015-16
- A Luxury We Cannot Afford, 2015
- Imagine there’s no country, Above us only our cities, 2015
- A Hundred Years of Shame – Songs of Resistance and Scenarios for Chinese Nations, 2015
- Ten Million Rooms of Yearning. Sex in Hong Kong, 2014
- Great Crescent: Art and Agitation in the 1960s—Japan, South Korea, and Taiwan, 2013-2014
- A Journal of the Plague Year. Fear, ghosts, rebels. SARS, Leslie and the Hong Kong story, 2013

=== Major travelling exhibitions ===
- Koloa: Women, Art, and Textiles, Langafonua Center, Nuku'alofa, Tonga, 2019.
- A beast, a god, and a line, Kunsthall Trondheim, Norway, 2019; Museum of Modern Art in Warsaw, Poland, 2018; Pyinsa Rasa Art Space at The Secretariat & Myanm/art Gallery, Yangon, 2018; Dhaka Art Summit, 2018.
- An Opera for Animals, Rockbund Art Museum, Shanghai, 2019
- Chris Evans, Pak Sheung Chuen: Two Exhibitions, Hong-gah Museum, Taipei, 2019
- Great Crescent: Art and Agitation in the 1960s—Japan, South Korea, and Taiwan in Mexico City, Museo Universitario Arte Contemporáneo, Mexico; Mori Art Museum, Tokyo, 2015-2016.
- A Journal of the Plague Year, Kadist Art Foundation, San Francisco; Arko Art Center, Seoul, Korea; TheCube Project Space, Taipei, Taiwan; 2014-2015.
- Taiping Tianguo: A History of Possible Encounters: Ai Weiwei, Frog King Kwok, Tehching Hsieh, and Martin Wong, e-flux, New York; NUS Museum, Singapore; SALT, Istanbul; 2013-2014.

== Education ==
=== Conferences ===
Since 2013, Para Site has hosted an annual international conference. The three-day event brings together professionals in the field from both Hong Kong and abroad in debating issues of relevance in contemporary exhibition making. The conferences are free of charge and open to the public.

=== Emerging Curators Program ===
The annual emerging curators programme is an open-call process that culminates in a summer exhibition at Para Site. It was initiated in 2014. Past exhibitions stemming from the program include Imagine there’s no country, Above us only our cities, by Jims Lam Chi Hang, in 2015 and That Has Been, and May be Again, by Leo Li Chen and Wu Mo, in 2016.

=== Workshops for Emerging Professionals ===
In 2015, Para Site launched a week-long series of workshops for emerging professionals in conjunction with its annual conference. The curatorial mentorship program includes participants from varying professional backgrounds from across the region and the world.

== Residencies ==
The Para Site International Art Residency (PSIAR) is an invitation-only programme that brings artists, curators and writers to Hong Kong for a period of up to two months. Participants engage with the local and regional art scene through studio visits, performances, screenings and talks.

== Publications ==
Para Site published a quarterly bilingual magazine, P/S, from 1997 to 2006. It was Hong Kong’s first visual arts magazine, and provided a platform for the development of art writing. It has also published numerous catalogues, such as exhibition readers for its travelling exhibitions Taiping Tianguo: A History of Possible Encounters (2012) and A Journal of the Plague Year (2013).

== Other Programs ==
=== Migrant domestic workers project ===
From July 2015 to 2016, Para Site organized a series of photography, art, education and literature programmes to engage the migrant domestic worker community. Collaborating with local grassroots organizations, these projects included “Room to Read”, an initiative that brought the writings of domestic workers into the wider community through reading groups, as well as photography workshops, in partnership with Lensational.

== Board of Directors ==
Para Site is a registered charity with the Hong Kong Inland Revenue Department. It maintains a Board of Directors that includes, as of 2026, Shane Akeroyd, Dr. Yeewan Koon, Alan Lau, Agnes Lew, Alan Lo (Chair), Adeline Ooi, Federico Tan, Honus Tandijono, Yuki Terase, and Sara Wong Chi Hang.

=== Executive Directors ===
Since 2005 Para Site has been led by the following curators:

- Tobias Berger (2005-2011)
- Cosmin Costinaș (2011–2022)
- Billy Tang (2022-2025)
- James Taylor-Foster (2026-)

=== Funding ===
Para Site receives financial support from the Hong Kong Arts Development Council, private patrons, and an annual fundraising auction. It also receives grants from the S.H.Ho Foundation and the Foundation for Arts Initiatives.

In 2014, it was awarded a consecutive Springboard Grant of HK$4.5 million from the Home Affairs Bureau, Art Capacity Development Funding Scheme.
