= Society-related comics =

Society-related comics are comics (manhua) that reflect societal issues and topics. In Hong Kong, some of them are about social satire; some talk about daily lives of Hongkongers; some caricaturists also talk about past lives of Hong Kong in order to recall a collective memory, etc. McDull is the first well-known society-related comic. McDull was created by two local caricaturists, Alice Mak and Brian Tse. They use a hilarious way to express the core value, diligence.

== Purpose and platform ==
Society-related comics are often seen in different social media such as Facebook, Twitter, blogs and Instagram. In contemporary society, social media has become one of the most powerful and accessible channels for people to share and get new information. As social media has become more specialized, like Instagram, which focused on pictures, and Twitter, which set a limited word count for every post, society-related comics have become an alternative way for people to post what they want to share. On average, a post which has a society-related comic or drawing uses relatively fewer words.

It is also common to read society-related comics in newspapers. The editor aims to make a dig at a social issue but does not want to make it directly, so they use comics to convey the message in a humorous way. The typical example was the comic talking about unauthorized building work of Henry Tang Ying-yen.

And, society-related comic books can be found in bookshops. Ideas for stories included in such comics books always come from everyday life and social phenomena. For example, in a book It Is Just A Work (打份工啫) written by Aken Leung, the idea behind the stories is office politics. As the ideas are connected with daily experiences, this kind of book can always resonate with readers.

== Famous examples ==
One of the famous cartoonists is called Malone (馬龍). He started to draw themed comics in 1984 and his drawing style and theme were based on political humor. Malone chose the pseudonym Ma Sing (馬星) and started to draw the children's comic strip series White Cat Black Cat (白貓黑貓).

Another Hong Kong cartoonist, Zunzi (尊子), formerly known as Wong Kei-kwan (黃紀鈞), is keen on drawing political cartoons. He has worked for Ming Pao, Apple Daily and Next Magazine.

The old muddled series (老懵董系列) is another key example. Famously ironic, it was launched by "sub-culture hall" in 2000. It is a political comics series. The cover of the comics depict a seemingly old Tung sitting naked on the toilet. It is so extremely sarcastic. The comics used irony to depict the first SAR Hong Kong Chief Executive Tung Chee-hwa's perceived failure to manage the society.

Moreover, Bi Bi Pig is a Facebook fan page in which many posts consist of society-related comics since the start of 2014. Bi Bi Pig is the main character of those comics and the drawings that describe his adventures have theme such as “the things that drive you crazy” or “my childhood memory”. As Bi Bi Pig is set as a Hongkonger, his memories and experience are often shared by other Hong Kong people as well. In addition, I Am An Airline Stewardess uses Facebook as its platform but it is more oriented towards jobs. All the comics posted in that page are about the work of airline stewardesses. By reading those pictures, more people can learn more about that profession.

Other examples of society-related comic books include Fell In Love With Mr. Depression, by Lucia (2008), and There Is No Young Master In The Air written by Master E (2010). Also, SiuTung Illustration is another example of blogs with society-related comics.

== Influence ==
Teenagers are perhaps the most influenced by society-related comics. Firstly, social networking sites play a key role in their leisure activities and they can get information from surfing the internet easily. During adolescence, most people do not actively read up on social issues. However, society-related comics have made social affairs seem more interesting and funny for teenagers to read and investigate. It is common to see teenagers sharing these comics on Facebook. Led by the creation of those comics, more teenagers are willing to engage in social affairs activities.

Besides, society-related comics help to develop social cohesion. As the content is about the society of Hong Kong, it reflects common concerns. For example, in Bi Bi Pig, there is a comic called "My Childhood’s Candies" and nearly twenty two thousand people liked it. They bring a significant connection of Hongkongers with each other.

In addition the comics have been used in education. Liberal Studies is an integral part of the New Senior Secondary curriculum in Hong Kong. In this course, the Hong Kong Examinations Assessment Authority have used society-related comics as topics of examination. Students need to interpret the content of the comics and theme that reflects the comics. With the popularity of society-related comics, the assessment authority prefers to use comics instead of a long article for the examinations.
