= Avenue of the Stars =

The Avenue of the Stars or the Avenue of Stars may refer to:

== Locations ==
- Avenue of the Stars (Los Angeles), an avenue in Los Angeles, California, United States
- Avenue of Stars, Hong Kong, an avenue in Hong Kong honoring the Hong Kong film industry
- Hong Kong Avenue of Comic Stars, an avenue in Hong Kong honoring Hong Kong comics
- Avenue of the Stars, a street in Cedar Park, Texas where the Cedar Park Center is located
- Avenue of the Stars, a street in Frisco, Texas where the Dr Pepper Arena is located
- Avenue of Stars, London, a former exhibition in London, England

== Other ==
- Avenue of the Stars: 50 Years of ITV, a television special from 2005 to celebrate 50 years of ITV
- List of halls and walks of fame
