= The People Will Not Forget =

1989 non-fiction book

- Author: 64 journalists
- Original title: 人民不會忘記
- Genre: Non-fiction
- Publisher: Hong Kong Journalists Association
- Publication date: December 1989
- ISBN: 978-988-97622-4-7

People Will Not Forget: A Chronicle by 64 Hong Kong Reporters (Chinese: 人民不會忘記) collects the personal experiences of 64 Hong Kong journalists who covered the 1989 Tiananmen Square protests and massacre in Beijing. The title People Will Not Forget was taken from a slogan displayed on the Monument to the People's Heroes.

== History ==
The first edition was published in July 1989, followed by an expanded edition in December 1989. In 2009, on the 20th anniversary of June 4, a further 10,000 copies were printed. The reprinted edition has a new preface and additional chronology of major events in the 1989 democracy movement. The publisher, Hong Kong Journalists Association, pledged to allocate proceeds from sales of the book to the "People Will Not Forget Fund", which aims to promote freedom of the press and freedom of publication in mainland China and Hong Kong. Since 2010, the book is available online free of charge.

In 2019, a related documentary, titled I am a Journalist, My June 4 story, was released. It collects the story of 30 journalists.

== Censorship ==
After the political cartoonist Zunzi was fired from Ming Pao, the Leisure and Cultural Services Department removed his works from Hong Kong Public Libraries. Books related to the June 4th Incident were also removed, including The People Will Not Forget.

In 2024, while imprisoned under the national security law, Chow Hang-tung's mother attempted to send her four books, including People Will Not Forget, in accordance with prison procedures. The Correctional Services Department withheld all four, citing their “biased descriptions of social events" and stating that they might foster "an awareness of resistance to governance." Chow subsequently sought judicial review, challenging the decision as an infringement of her freedom of expression under the Basic Law. After the chief executive issued a certificate declaring the books related to "national security." Chow withdrew the case.
