= Ma Long (disambiguation) =

Ma Long or Malong may refer to:

== People ==
- Ma Long (Jin dynasty) (fl. 251–290; 马隆/馬隆/Mǎ Lóng), Cao Wei and Jin dynasty military general
- Ma-long (馬龍/马龙/mǎlóng/maa5 lung4), Hong Kong political cartoonist
- Ma Long (born 1988; 马龙/馬龍/Mǎ Lóng), Chinese table tennis player
- Ma Long (footballer) (born 1990; 马龙/馬龍/Mǎ Lóng), Chinese football player

== Other ==
- Malong County (马龙县/Mǎlóng Xiàn), in Qujing Prefecture, Yunnan, China.
- Malong, the tube skirt from Southeast Asia
- Malong, Meichuan, a village in Meichuan, Wuxue, Huanggang, Hubei
- Malong Revolt (1660–1661), see Philippine revolts against Spain#Malong Revolt (1660–1661)

== See also ==
- Longma (龙马/龍馬/lóngmǎ/lung-ma), the dragon horse of Chinese mythology
