= Ma Xingyuan =

Ma Xingyuan may refer to:

- Ma Sing-yuen, Hong Kong caricaturist and Chinese ink artist
- Ma Xingyuan (politician), Chinese politician, governor of Fujian province 1979–1983
