= Fong She-mei =

Fong She-mei 方舒眉
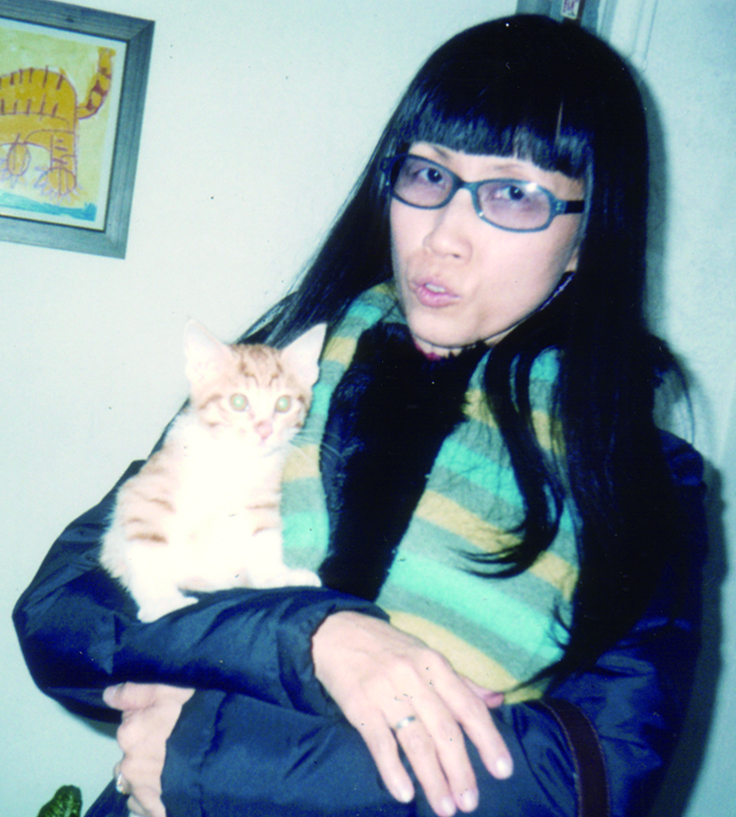
- Portrait of Fong She-mei

Fong She-mei
- Chinese: 方舒眉
Transcriptions
Standard Mandarin
- Hanyu Pinyin: Fāng Shūméi
Yue: Cantonese
- Jyutping: fong1 syu1 mei4

Fong She-mei (Chinese: 方舒眉) is a writer, publisher and journalist in Hong Kong. She was an educator, a journalist and editor for various newspapers and magazines before starting her career as a writer. She graduated in Journalism from Hong Kong Shue Yan College in 1982 and received her master’s degree from Lancaster University in 1991. Her works had received numerous awards.

== Career ==
Between the 1980s and the late 1990s, Fong worked as a journalist and editor for various newspapers and magazines.

In 1998, Fong co-founded Century Culture Ltd, a book and magazines publisher in Hong Kong, with caricaturist Ma Sing-yuen.

In 2004, Fong began writing children's literature, including the White Cat Black Cat series with Ma.

The success of the White Cat Black Cat series earned them a Ming Pao interview in 2012.

In 2014, invited by Sing Tao Education (Chinese), Fong and Ma created a series of comics based on 12 classical Chinese texts.

In 2015, Fong and Ma published the book “Fun with Classical Chinese”. The book was one of the best-selling publications that year in Hong Kong.

In 2018, Fong published two books: “Flying Over Misery” and “The Passage of Time”. A proportion of the proceeds of the former one was donated to the United Nations High Commissioner for Refugees (UNHCR). She was later interviewed by the online media “Singjai” about her thoughts and feelings of these two books.

From 2015 to 2016, she recalled her journey as a writer and introduced tips on written communication on the “Young Writers Training Programme” of Ming Pao; In 2018, she was the host of “Rainbow Palette”, a 13-episode programme of the RTHK; and was invited as a guest speaker at the radio programme “Literature Literary Literati”.

Since 2019, Fong served as the director and an instructor for the “Promotion of Chinese” programme” and the “Cartoon Story Writing and Creative Writing Workshop” of the Standing Committee on Language Education and Research (SCOLAR) of Hong Kong.

== Works ==
=== Prose ===
- “Urban Legends” （都市傳說）
- “Tender Proses by Fong She-mei”（方舒眉柔情短篇）
- “Banquet”（晚宴）
- “Butterflies’ Wings”（蝴蝶翅膀）
- “Right Now: the Happiest Times”（此時此刻最快樂）
- “Tomorrow is Always Waiting There”
- “The Pursuit of Spiritual Purity”（心靈充實潔淨的追求）
- “Finding the Feeling of Happiness”（尋找幸福的感覺）
- “Buddhism Changes Our Lives”（禪轉人生）
- “Urban Romances”（城市之戀）
- “Between the Brows, in the Heart”（眉間心上）
- “Flying Over Misery”（飛越苦難）
- “The Passage of Time”（流光月淘）

=== White Cat Black Cat Series ===
- “Detective Cat Series” （傻貓神探系列）
- “Chinese History Journey Series”（中國歷史大冒險系列）
- “World Classics Theatre”（世界經典名著系列）
- “The Blue Planet Series”（藍地球系列）
- “Funny Liberal Study Series”（奇趣通識系列）
- “School Detective Series”（校園小偵探系列）
- “Funny Comic Strips Series”（六格爆笑彈系列）

== Awards ==
=== The Best Ten Book Picks Award (Hong Kong Reading City) ===
- 7th Edition of Hong Kong Reading City, in 2009: Best Ten Books, “Splendid Festival Legends”
- 9th Edition of Hong Kong Reading City, in 2011: Detective Cat – “The Mayan Warrior”
- 9th Edition of Hong Kong Reading City, in 2011 : 3rd Prize, "Funny Comic Strips Vol.42"
- 12th Edition of Hong Kong Reading City, in 2014 : 5th Prize, "Mystery of Dinosaurs"
- 13th Edition of Hong Kong Reading City, in 2015 : 1st Prize, "School Detective II"
- 13th Edition of Hong Kong Reading City, in 2015 : 4th Prize, "Detective Cat - Against the Sky"
- 14th Edition of Hong Kong Reading City, in 2016 : Best Ten Books, "Detective Cat - Capture the Vampire"
- 17th Edition of Hong Kong Reading City, in 2020: 3rd Prize, “Look Here, Phubbers!”
- 17th Edition of Hong Kong Reading City, in 2020: 4th Prize, “Fun with Global Literature”

The Best Ten Books Election is held by Hong Kong Reading City every year and is based on a trial reading system, with students choosing their favourite books and authors.

=== Hong Kong Publishing Biennial Awards ===
- 1st Edition of Hong Kong Publishing Biennial Awards, in 2017 : "Language Education" category Prize, Fun with Classical Chinese
- 2nd Edition of Hong Kong Publishing Biennial Awards, in 2019: “Psychology and Self-Help” category Prize, “Flying Over Misery”
- 3rd Edition of Hong Kong Publishing Biennial Awards, in 2021: “Children and Young Adult” category Prize, “Fun with Global Literature”
