= Chan Ya =

- 陳也
- Born: 1963
- Spouse: Zunzi

Chan Ya (Chinese: 陳也, born 1963) is a Chinese cartoonist and newspaper columnist. She is the second prominent female cartoonist to work in Hong Kong.

Chan Ya was born in 1963. She worked as a newspaper columnist before publishing cartoons. Her cartooning work was first published in January 1989 in the daily newspaper Sing Wan Pao (New Evening News). She also drew cartoons for the women's magazine Sisters to accompany her written pieces.

Her comic strips for Sing Wan Pao centered on a woman deliberately depicted in an unattractive manner, a loud woman with large lips. Wong and Culklanz note that Chan Ya used the grotesque to both subvert conventional standards of beauty and to provide an "outsider critique" of events in Hong Kong. Her political commentary targeting the Chinese government was disliked by the publications management, and her work also was critiqued by feminists, who disliked her depiction of women. Her strip was cancelled following the Tiananmen Square massacre that June. She collected over 160 comic strips in a 1989 book called 一個女人三個墟 ("One Woman Can Make Three Markets"). The title refers to the proverb that "three women can make a market," about the noise made by the conversation of women.

Following the cancellation of her strip and the publication of her collection, she did not publish more cartooning work. She later wrote for the newspaper Ming Pao.

== Personal life ==
Chan Ya married the cartoonist Wong Kei-kwan (Chinese: 黃紀鈞) who uses the pen name Zunzi (Chinese: 尊子). They had a son in 2004.

== Bibliography ==
- 一個女人三個墟. ("One Woman Can Make Three Markets") Chuangjian Publishing Group, 1989.

== Notes ==
^1 The proverb appeared in English in George Herbert's Outlandish Proverbs (1640), translated from the Italian version in Stefano Guazzo's La Civil Conversatione (1604).
