= Ma Sing-yuen =

Malone Ma (Ma Sing-yuen)
- 馬龍（馬星原）
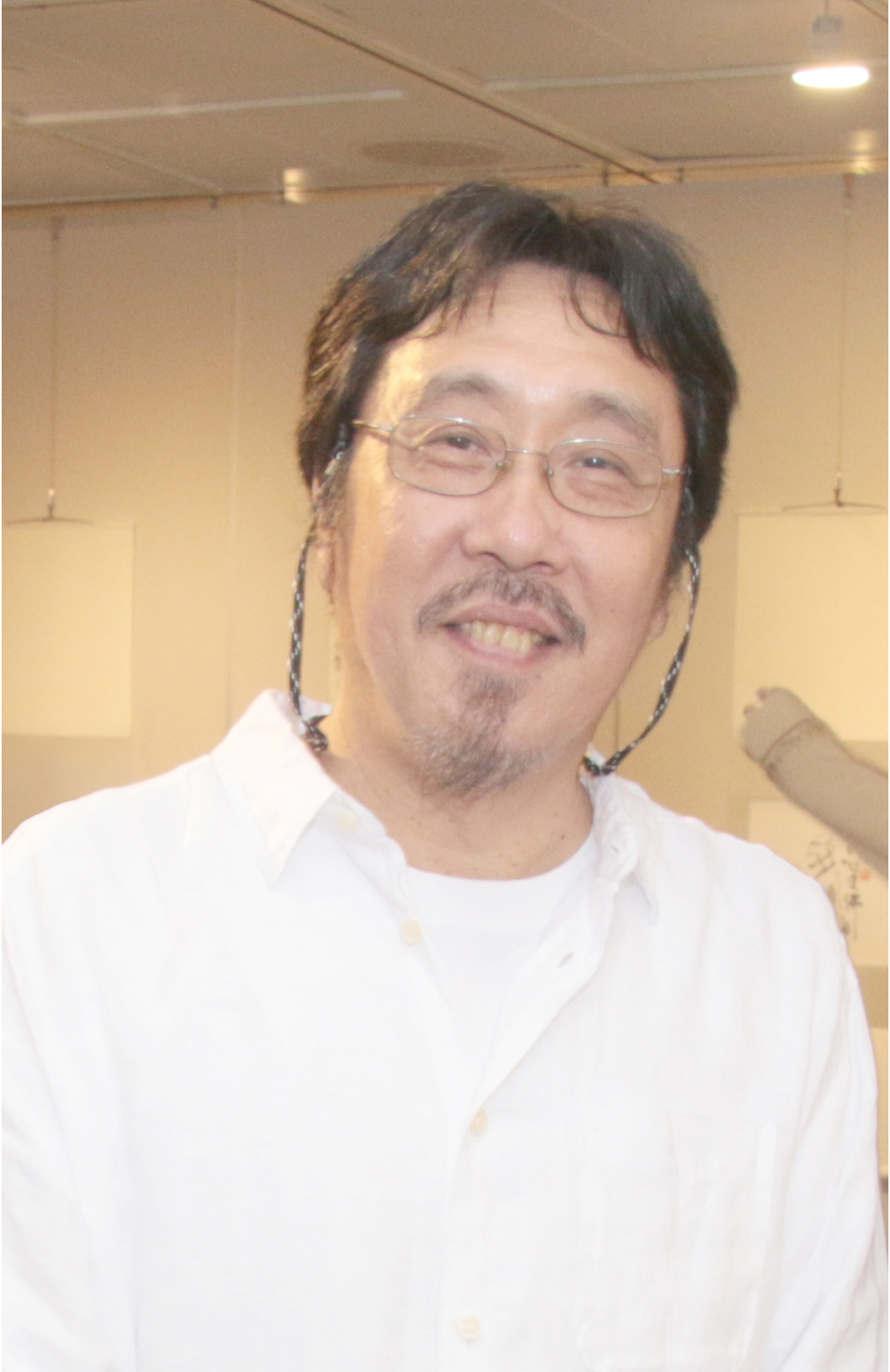
- Portrait of Malone Ma (Ma Sing-yuen)

Ma Sing-yuen
- Traditional Chinese: 馬龍（馬星原）
- Simplified Chinese: 马龙（马星原）
Transcriptions
Standard Mandarin
- Hanyu Pinyin: Mǎ Lóng (Mǎ Xīngyuán)
Yue: Cantonese
- Jyutping: Maa5 Lung4 (Maa5 sing1 jyun4)

Malone Ma (Caricaturist) (Chinese: 馬龍), also known by his pen name Ma Sing-yuen (Chinese: 馬星原), is a Hong Kong caricaturist and Chinese ink artist. As of 2024, he has held 6 solo art exhibitions.

Themes of his comics include history, biography, slice-of-life and children’s educational caricatures. He used to work as an art director and art editor for newspapers and magazines and has been publishing his works in several major newspapers in Hong Kong since 1984. His works have received numerous awards. He created the “White Cat Black Cat” series with writer Fong She-mei, and a sculpture of its protagonist- “Q Boy”, is now established at Kowloon Park and Golden Bauhinia Square.

== Career ==
Ma sent his first piece of artwork to a newspaper in 1973, which marked the start of his career. Shortly after, he started working as a caricaturist and then an art director for several newspapers and magazines.

In 1983, Ma co-founded the “Hong Kong Cartoonist Association” with other caricaturists/cartoonists who upheld mutual interests: Zunzi, Mok Wah, Yat Muk, and Yeung Wai-pong. The association hosted several local comic exhibitions and exchange activities with Mainland Chinese caricaturists.

Ma created the “White Cat Black Cat” series together with writer Fong She-mei in 2004. Q boy, the protagonist of the “White Cat Black Cat” series, was one of the 24 classic local comic characters selected by the Hong Kong Comics and Animation Federation (HKCAF) in 2012. The three-dimensional sculpture of Q boy was displayed at the Hong Kong Avenue of Comic Stars in Kowloon Park, Tsim Sha Tsui; and at Golden Bauhinia Square in Wan Chai. The success of the “White Cat Black Cat” series earned them a Ming Pao interview later that year.

In 2014, invited by Sing Tao Education (Chinese), Ma and Fong created a series of comics based on 12 classical Chinese texts. Meanwhile, his works were presented at the “An Encounter with Xuanzang” exhibition held by the Shanghai Zhongwai Culture Art Exchange Association.

In 2015, Ma held his first Chinese brush paintings exhibition at the City Hall High Block. The same year, Ma and Fong published the book “Fun with Classical Chinese”. The book was one of the best-selling publications that year in Hong Kong.

In 2016, "The Daily Life of the Wise," created under the name "Ma Xingyuan," was reported on by Sing Tao Daily [12]. Later that year, Ma and Fang were jointly interviewed by The Epoch Times, sharing their life journeys, values, and more. In 2020, they participated in the "Against the Current: Elegance of Hong Kong Ink — Exhibition of Famous Works."

In 2017, Ma's second Ink Painting Exhibition was held at Fo Guang Yuan Changhua Art Gallery (Hong Kong). Moreover, Ma was invited to a seminar during the 2017 Hong Kong Book Fair to recall his journey of art creation. Then in July, he joined the Hong Kong Art Gallery Association (HKAGA) where two of his ink paintings. “Bodhidharma Across the River” and “Bodhidharma Facing the Wall”, were exhibited at the seminar “Visions Present and Future”.

In 2018, Ma held his third Chinese Poetry and Ink Painting Exhibition ‘Glimpse of the Bygone: Ma Sing Yuen's Chinese Poetry and Ink Painting Exhibition’ at the Tsimshatsui Book Centre of the Commercial Press in Hong Kong, which drew inspiration from Fun with Classical Chinese, which he had jointly produced with Fong She-mei. He was also invited abroad to have a solo exhibition in September at the Nan Tien Temple Fo Guang Yuan Art Gallery in Sydney.

Furthermore, in 2018, Ma and Fong hosted “Rainbow Palette”, a 13-episode programme of the RTHK. Later, they were interviewed by online media “Singjai”.

Since 2019, Ma has been serving as an arts instructor for the “Promotion of Chinese” programme and the “Cartoon Story Writing and Creative Writing Workshop” of the Standing Committee on Language Education and Research (SCOLAR) of Hong Kong.

In 2024, Ma co-hosted the “In Memory of the 105th Anniversary of Master Hongyi’s Ordination: The Li Lijuan-Ma Singyuen Ink Painting and Calligraphy Joint Exhibition” with Li Lijuan. In the same year, he also held the "Happy Ink Paintings: Ma Singyuen Ink Painting Exhibition" at Hong Kong City Hall.

In March 2025, their renowned "Peach Blossom Spring" series won the Gold Award at the Japan NPO International Calligraphy and Painting Exchange Exhibition, and in May of the same year, they were invited to exhibit at the Pinghu Museum [15].

In July of the same year, they participated in a calligraphy and painting art fair organized by Daye Art Bookstore in Central, showcasing a series of ink comic square paintings, observing the world with a smile through these works.

In March 2026, they held an ink painting exhibition titled "Peach Blossoms Bloom in the Spring Breeze" at the Yilu Art Gallery in Guangzhou Cultural Park

== Works ==
=== White Cat Black Cat Series ===
- Digital Journey to the West （數碼西遊）(Volumes 1 to 70)
- The Adventures of Chinese History（中國歷史大冒險） (Volumes 1 to 13)
- Funny Comic Strips （六格爆笑彈）(Volumes 1 to 92)
- White Cat Black Cat Monthly （白貓黑貓漫畫月刊）(Volumes 1 to 248)

=== Ink Paintings ===
- A Hill is Nothing But A Hill （見山只是山） 96 cm×177 cm
- Hanshan Contemplates Shide （寒山問拾得） 39 cm×39 cm
- The Carrot of Zhenzhou （鎮州蘿蔔） 39 cm×39 cm
- Bodhidharma Across the River （達摩渡江） 143 cm×25 cm
- The Eighteen Ahrats （十八羅漢） 30 cm×30 cm

== Others ==
He has argued that libraries should pay royalties to Hong Kong authors.
