= Standing Committee on Language Education and Research =

Hong Kong quasi-governmental advisory body

The Standing Committee on Language Education and Research is a quasi-governmental advisory body set up to carry out research into language education, including public consultation exercises, and to give advice on language education policy including medium of instruction policy to the Hong Kong Government's Education and Manpower Bureau (formerly the Education Department).

It is currently chaired by Anissa Chan, a Hong Kong educator.

It continues active work in the field, including sponsorship of various activities to support the teaching and learning of English, including the English‑Speaking Union (Hong Kong).
