= White Cat Black Cat =

- Traditional Chinese: 白貓黑貓
- Simplified Chinese: 白猫黑猫
Transcriptions
Standard Mandarin
- Hanyu Pinyin: Báimāo Hēimāo
Yue: Cantonese
- Jyutping: baak6 maau1 hak1 maau1

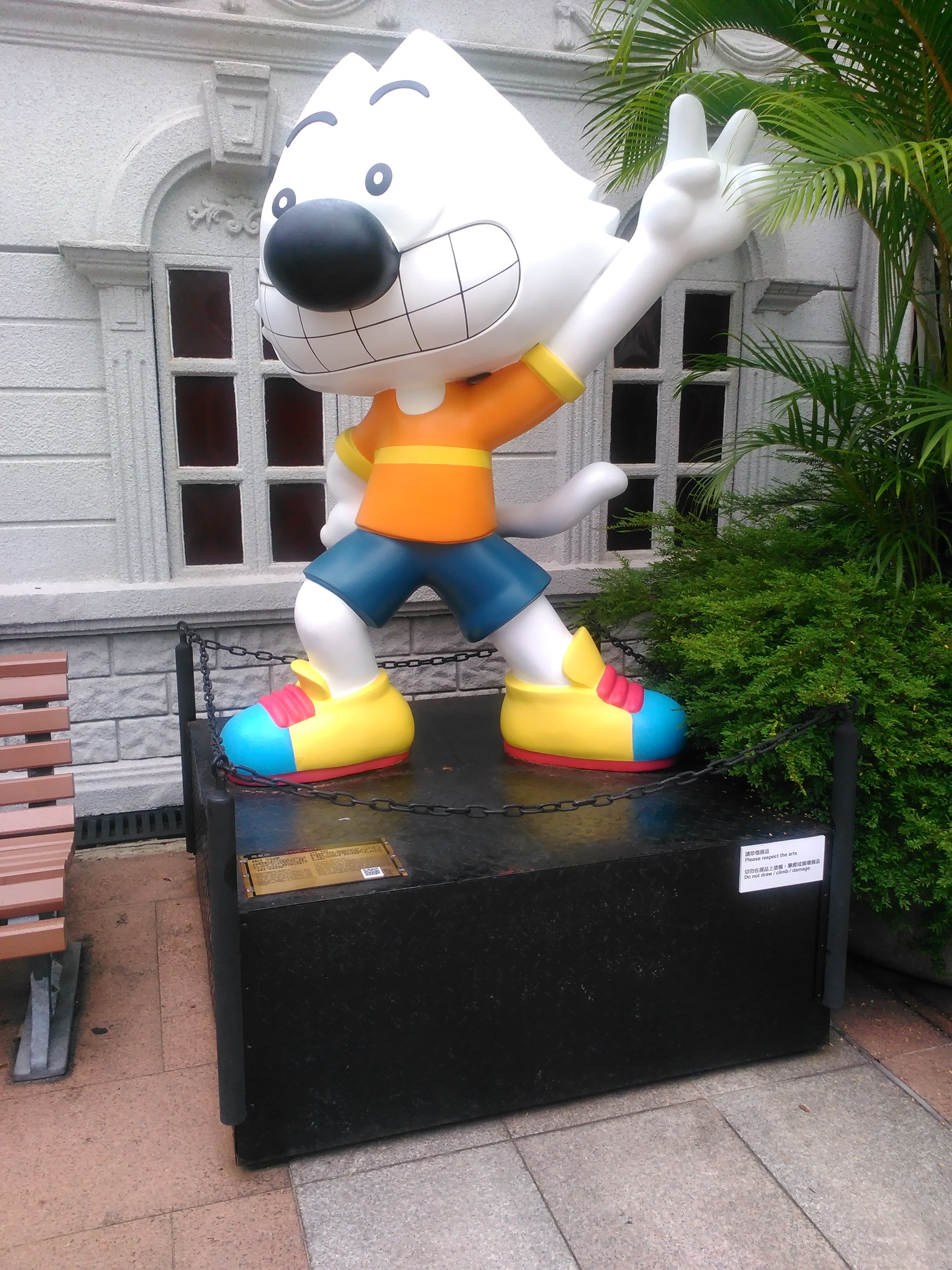
Q-Boy in the Hong Kong Avenue of Comic Stars

Q Boy (first from left) and Doctor A (third from left)

The White Cat Black Cat (Chinese: 白貓黑貓) is a book series that was founded by Ma Sing-yuen and Fong She Mei in 2004.

== Characters ==
The main characters are a white cat named Q Boy (Q小子; Q-siu2 zi2; Q-xiǎozǐ) and a black cat scholar named Doctor A (A博士; A-bok3 si6; A-bóshì). They are characters created by Ma Sing-yuen (Ma-long).

Q Boy is the main character of the White Cat Black Cat series. He is one of the 24 classic local comic characters selected by CreateHK in 2012. The three-dimensional sculpture of Q Boy was displayed at Kowloon Park in Tsim Sha Tsui and Golden Bauhinia Square in Wan Chai.

Q Boy asks questions and Doctor A, who is the uncle of Q Boy, has answers. Their names refer to the English words "question" and "answer". Besides the characters mentioned above, Ma Sing-yuen created several other characters as well, like cat girl Miu Miu, Q Boy's little brother Chocolate, and Q Boy's best friend Little D. The series was established in 2004.

== White Cat Black Cat Series ==
- Funny Cat Detective Series
- Fascinating Knowledge Series
- History Adventure Series
- Funny Liberal Studies Series
- White Cat Black Cat View the World Series
- Digital West Series
- Six Box Comics Series

== Recognition ==
Century Culture had published over 800 publications and 10 series of '' White Cat Black Cat'' since its establishment. The books include '' Detective Cat'' series, '' Jokes Series'', '' and the Digital Journey to the West '' series.

The series has won several book awards in Hong Kong. Ma Sing-yuen and Fong She Mei won the Best Ten Books Election Award from Hong Kong Reading City several times, including 3rd Prize in 2011, 5th Prize in 2014, and 1st Prize in 2015.

Because of the popularity of White Cat Black Cat, Fong She-mei and Ma Sing-yuen had a Ming Pao interview in 2012.

In 2014, Sing Tao Daily invited Fong She-mei and Ma Sing-yuen to create a new section, Comics about 12 Traditional Chinese Model Essay.

Hong Kong Reading City

The Best Ten Books Election Award

- 9th Edition of Hong Kong Reading City, in 2011: 3rd Prize, Six Box Comics Vol. 42
- 12th Edition of Hong Kong Reading City, in 2014: 5th Prize, Mystery of Dinosaurs
- 13th Edition of Hong Kong Reading City, in 2015: 1st Prize, Little Detective of Schoolyard II

The Best Ten Books Election is held by Hong Kong Reading City every year. The election is based on a trial reading system. Students can choose their favourite books and writers.

== See also ==
- Black Cat, White Cat, a Serbian film
