= Zunzi =

Hong Kong comics artist

Wong Kei-kwan
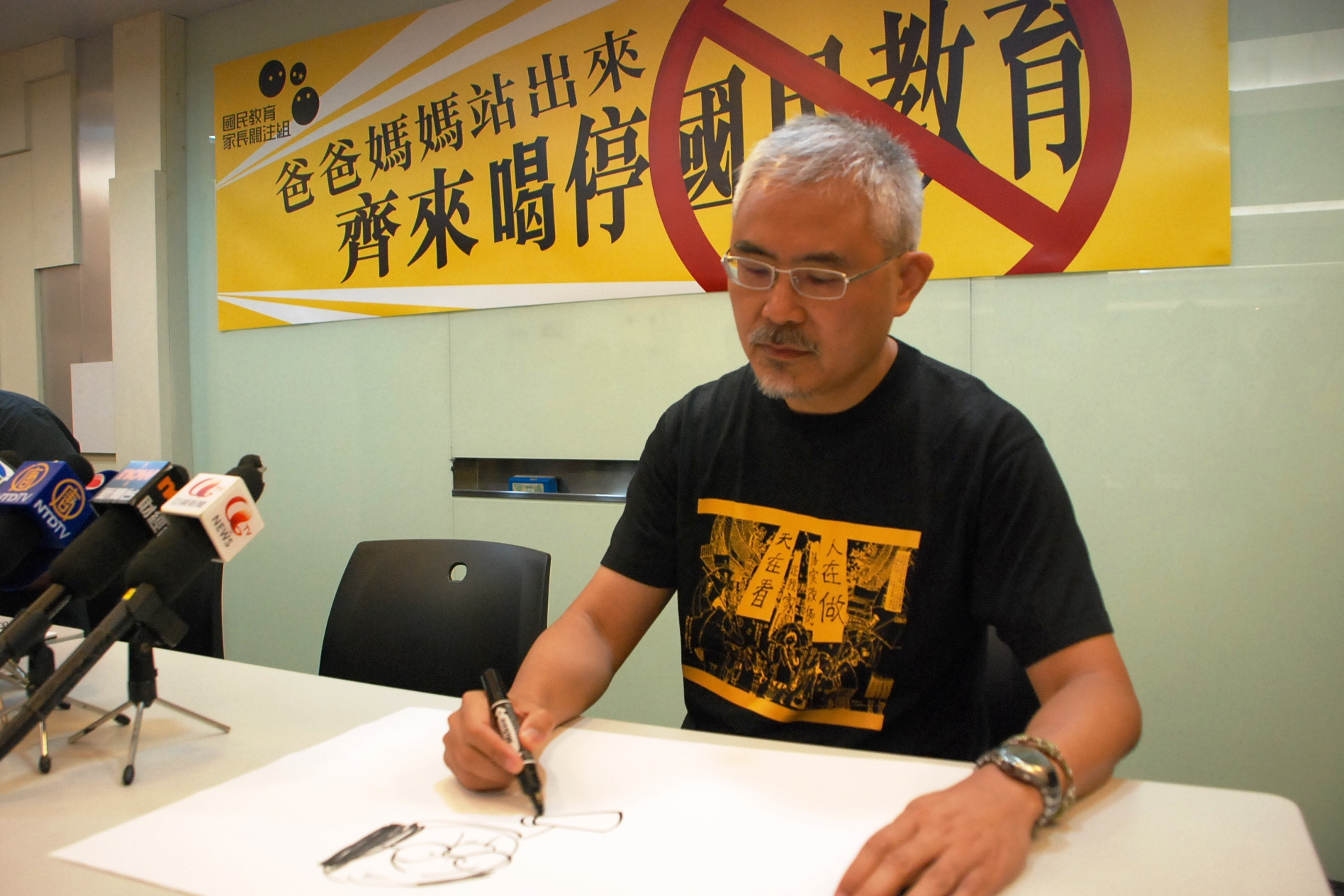
- Wong Kei-kwan(Zunzi) during a press conference
- Traditional Chinese: 黃紀鈞
- Simplified Chinese: 黄纪钧
Transcriptions
Standard Mandarin
- Hanyu Pinyin: Huáng Jìjūn
Yue: Cantonese
- Jyutping: wong4 gei2 gwan1

Zunzi
- Chinese: 尊子
Transcriptions
Standard Mandarin
- Hanyu Pinyin: Zūnzǐ
Yue: Cantonese
- Jyutping: zyun1 zi2

Wong Kei-kwan (Chinese: 黃紀鈞, born 1955), better known by his pen name Zunzi (Chinese: 尊子), is a Hong Kong political cartoonist known for his satire and pro-democracy stance and has been described as "the territory's most prominent political cartoonist".

== Career ==
Zunzi was born in 1955 and grew up in Ma Tau Wai Estate. He was educated at Diocesan Boys' School and graduated from the Department of Fine Arts at the Chinese University of Hong Kong. After a spell teaching, he joined Ming Pao as an editor for foreign wire services.

He began his career as a political cartoonist in 1983 at Ming Pao, at the invitation of newspaper founder Louis Cha as Hong Kong people were growing more politically aware during the Sino-British negotiations on Hong Kong's sovereignty. His cartoons were also published in Apple Daily and Next Magazine until those publications were forced to disband for allegedly violating the local national security law in 2021. He also drew cartoons for pro-Beijing newspapers New Evening Post and Ta Kung Pao, earning just HK$50 for each published item.

His cartoons were known for their political satire about Hong Kong and Chinese politics and his pro-democracy stance, covering topics such as the 1989 Tiananmen Square massacre, 2008 Chinese milk scandal, 2014 Hong Kong protests and the abolition of the term limits for the President of China in 2018.

=== Censorship ===
At an art exchange event in Singapore in 1998, Zunzi refused a request to change the content of a cartoon about Singapore's first Prime Minister Lee Kuan Yew and then Prime Minister Goh Chok Tong, causing all of his works to be removed from display. While some Hong Kong media reported that this was done by Singaporean officials, Ming Pao identified the action as by the Singapore Art Museum.

In 1999 soon after the handover of Macau, Zunzi, his wife and 11 Macanese artists were detained by the police for three hours for organising an "alternative" handover celebration activity.

In 2020, more than half of 13 Zunzi's illustrations in a liberal education textbook published by Ming Pao were censored, including satirical cartoons about Chief Executives Leung Chun-ying and Carrie Lam, the 2014 NPCSC Decision on Hong Kong that ruled out universal suffrage of Hong Kong in 2017, and the Causeway Bay Books disappearances.

Between 2022 and 2023, the Hong Kong government on six different occasions criticised Zunzi's cartoons for "inaccuracy". On 5 January 2023, Chief Secretary for Administration Eric Chan posted on Facebook criticising Zunzi's cartoon for "biased, misleading and untrue allegations against the Chief Executive in fulfilling his constitutional duty to maintain national security".

On 2 April 2023, Secretary for Security Chris Tang criticised a Zunzi illustration that mocked the government for allocating huge amount of funding to the Hong Kong Police's equipment renewal, accusing Zunzi of "using some misleading accusations to incite dissatisfaction with the government".

Following Tang's remarks, the state-run Ta Kung Pao commentary on 4 April said Zunzi always "smears" the policies of the central and SAR governments, supports anti-China forces and mocks patriotic forces. The commentary urged the SAR government to prosecute Zunzi for defamation.

In May, a Zunzi cartoon mocking the proposed District Council election overhaul was criticised by the Home and Youth Affairs Bureau, which repeatedly condemned Ming Pao for "misleading remarks" against the government proposal, "which is an act of politics over morality".

On 11 May, Ming Pao announced that, from 14 May, Zunzi cartoons would no longer be published, thanking him for "witnessing the changes of time with us in the past 40 years", without further explanation. The Hong Kong Journalists Association (HKJA) "expressed sorrow that officials backed by huge resources targeted an individual" which showed that criticism was not tolerated. it also feared it would further fuel self-censorship. Chris Tang "strongly condemned" the HKJA's claim that the government does not respect the freedom of speech and said Ming Pao's decision was "responsible".

It was reported that Zunzi's publications were also taken down in Hong Kong public libraries around 11 May. The LCSD would not confirm the report, but said that "any book with suspected content that may violate national security or Hong Kong laws will be removed immediately for review".

== Awards ==
Zunzi was awarded the Kofi Annan Courage in Cartooning award in 2024 citing his dismissal by the newspaper Ming Pao and criticism by the Chinese government. They noted that China ranked 140 out of 180 countries in the Reporters San Frontieres press freedom index. Zunzi received the award along with India's Rachita Taneja.

== Personal life ==
Zunzi is married to Chan Ya, a Ming Pao reporter and columnist. The couple have a son, born in 2004.

== See also ==
- Society-related comics
- Headliner, a RTHK political satires TV programme running from 1989 to 2020
