= Hong Kong Avenue of Comic Stars =

- Traditional Chinese: 香港漫畫星光大道
- Simplified Chinese: 香港漫画星光大道
Transcriptions
Standard Mandarin
- Hanyu Pinyin: Xiānggǎng Mànhuà Xīngguāng Dàdào
Yue: Cantonese
- Jyutping: hoeng1 gong2 maan6 waa6*2 ing1 gwong1 daai6 dou6

Hong Kong Avenue of Comic Stars (Chinese: 香港漫畫星光大道) is an area of Kowloon Park in Hong Kong which has statues of characters from Hong Kong comics ranging from the 1960s to the 2010s, named after Avenue of Stars, Hong Kong. The section, built for HK$1.5-2 million to HK$2 million, opened in 2012. It was organized by the Hong Kong Comics and Animation Federation and the Hong Kong Productivity Council.

Characters include Tiger and Dragon Heroes protagonist Wang Xiaohu (Chinese: 王小虎; pinyin: Wáng Xiǎohǔ; Jyutping: wong4 siu2 fu2), White Cat Black Cat protagonist Q-Boy, and Old Master Q. Each statue has a height of up to 3 metres (9.8 ft).
