= Hong Kong Chinese =

Hong Kong Chinese may refer to:

- One of the official languages of Hong Kong
- Hong Kong written Chinese, written Chinese in Hong kong
- Hong Kong Cantonese, the prominent Chinese language spoken in Hong Kong
- Hong Kong people, with Chinese nationality or of Chinese ethnicity
- Hongkong Chinese Bank, a bank in Hong Kong
