= Comparison of national standards of Chinese =

The Chinese language enjoys the status as official language in mainland China, Hong Kong, Macau, Singapore and Taiwan. It is recognized as a minority language in Malaysia. However, the language shows a high degree of regional variation among these territories.

== Differences in vocabulary ==
In many cases, those in China, Hong Kong, Macau, Malaysia, Singapore, and Taiwan use different words for the same meaning.

This section seeks to illustrate the differences in vocabulary by a limited selected examples. Note that language used in Hong Kong is almost identical to that of Macau, and that Malaysian vocabulary is identical to Singaporean vocabulary.

Meaning	China	Hong Kong	Macau	Malaysia	Singapore	Taiwan
Meaning	Simplified	Traditional	Traditional	Simplified	Simplified	Traditional
bus	公交车／大巴 / 公共汽车	巴士	巴士	巴士	巴士	公車
taxi	出租车, 的士, 计程车	的士, 的	的士, 的	德士	德士	計程車, 小黃
police	公安/警察	差人／警察	差人／治安警／司警	警察/警卫/马达	警察/警卫/马达	警察 / 員警/警衛
town square	广场	廣場	前地	广场	广场	廣場
laser	激光, 镭射	鐳射, 雷射, 激光	鐳射, 雷射, 激光	激光, laser	激光, laser	雷射
rapid transit	轨道交通／地铁	地鐵	地鐵	地铁	地铁	捷運
light rail	轻轨, 有轨电车	輕鐵	輕軌	轻轨	轻轨	輕軌
instant noodles	方便面, 泡面	即食麵, 公仔麵	即食麵, 公仔麵	泡面, 快熟面	泡面, 快熟面	泡麵, 速食麵, 生力麵
Cantonese	粤语/广东话/广州话	粵語/廣東話/廣州話	粵語/廣東話/廣州話	广东话	广东话	粵語
Mandarin	国语/普通话	國語/普通話	國語/普通話	华语	华语	國語
Hokkien	闽南语/闽南话	-	-	福建话/闽南话/闽南语	福建话/闽南话/闽南语	台語/閩南語/閩南話
potato	土豆, 马铃薯, 地蛋, 洋芋	薯仔	薯仔	马铃薯	马铃薯	馬鈴薯, 洋芋
pineapple	凤梨/菠萝	菠蘿, 鳳梨(only in 鳳梨酥)	菠蘿	黄梨	黄梨	鳳梨, 黃梨(in Hakka language), 菠蘿(in 菠蘿包)
lorry/truck	卡车(large truck);货车	貨車, 貨櫃車(cargo container truck)	貨車, 貨櫃車(cargo container truck)	罗里	罗里	貨車, 貨櫃車(cargo container truck)
tights/pantyhose	裤袜/连裤袜	襪褲	襪褲	裤袜	裤袜	褲襪
lunch box/bento	盒饭	飯盒	飯盒	便当, 盒饭	便当, 盒饭	便當, 飯盒
butter	黄油	牛油	牛油	牛油	牛油	奶油
air-conditioner	空调	冷氣機	冷氣機	冷气机	冷气机	冷氣機
paperclip	回形针/回纹针	萬字夾	萬字夾	回形针	回形针	迴紋針
rock paper scissors	石头剪子布	包剪揼	包剪揼	剪刀石头布	剪刀石头布	剪刀石頭布
plastic bag	袋子/塑料袋	膠袋	膠袋	塑胶袋, 塑料袋	塑胶袋, 塑料袋	塑膠袋
wet market	商场	街市	商場	巴刹	巴刹	商場
printer	打印机	打印機	打印機	打印机	打印机	印表機

== See also ==
- British and Malaysian English differences
- North–South differences in the Korean language
- Portuguese dialects#Notable features of some dialects
- Comparison of Indonesian and Standard Malay
- Variants of Standard Chinese
  - Beijing dialect
  - Hong Kong written Chinese
  - Taiwanese Mandarin
  - Malaysian Mandarin
  - Singaporean Mandarin
- Regional variants of Cantonese
  - Guangzhou Cantonese
  - Hong Kong Cantonese
  - Malaysian Cantonese
