= Sze-Wing Tang =

- Born: British Hong Kong
- Awards: Wang Li Award in Linguistics

Academic background
- Education: Chinese University of Hong Kong (MPhil); University of California, Irvine (PhD)
- Thesis: Parametrization of Features in Syntax (1998)
- Doctoral advisor: C.-T. James Huang

Academic work
- Discipline: Linguistics
- Sub-discipline: Generative grammar; Cartographic syntax
- Institutions: Chinese University of Hong Kong
- Doctoral students: Chaak-Ming Lau

Chinese name
- Traditional Chinese: 鄧思穎
- Simplified Chinese: 邓思颖
Transcriptions
Standard Mandarin
- Hanyu Pinyin: Dèng Sīyǐng
Yue: Cantonese
- Jyutping: dang6 si1 wing6
- Website: https://www.swtang.net/

Sze-Wing Tang is a linguist from Hong Kong. He is a professor of the Department of Chinese Language and Literature at the Chinese University of Hong Kong. He served as the ninth president of the Linguistic Society of Hong Kong in 2002–2003. His main research interests include syntactic theory and comparative linguistics, with a focus on Cantonese and other Chinese varieties. In 2017, he received the Wang Li Award in Linguistics for his monograph Lectures on Cantonese Grammar.

== Publications ==
- 2003.《漢語方言語法的參數理論》[A Parametric Theory of Chinese Dialectal Grammar]. Beijing: Peking University Press. ISBN 9-787-30106-1077
- 2010.《形式漢語句法學》[Formal Chinese Syntax]. Shanghai: Shanghai Educational Publishing House. ISBN 9-787-54443-0104
- 2015.《粵語語法講義》[Lectures on Cantonese Grammar]. Hong Kong: Commercial Press. ISBN 9-789-62070-3959
- 2018.《語法分析》[An Analysis of Grammar]. Hong Kong: Commercial Press. ISBN 9-789-62077-2801
- 2019.《形式漢語句法學（第二版）》[Formal Chinese Syntax (second edition)]. Shanghai: Shanghai Educational Publishing House. ISBN 9-787-54448-9577

== Honours ==
- 2012: Silver award of the 2011–2012 Li Fang-Kuei Book Awards in Linguistics from the Li Fang-Kuei Society for Chinese Linguistics for his monograph Formal Chinese Syntax
- 2017: Second prize of the 17th Wang Li Awards in Linguistics from Peking University for his monograph Lectures on Cantonese Grammar

== Views on Putonghua as the Medium of Instruction ==
From 2008, Hong Kong's Standing Committee on Language Education and Research had the intention of promoting a policy of "Putonghua as the medium of instruction" (PMI), and the Education Bureau also set this policy as a long-term goal. On the relevant policies, Tang believes that the medium of instruction should be the language most familiar to students and teachers. He finds that even though education in Hong Kong is supposed to enforce biliteracy and trilingualism, much more attention is placed on Putonghua and English, and the general public, and even teachers, lacks basic factual knowledge of Cantonese, such as romanization or grammar. Thus, he suggests that primary and secondary education should have more instruction on the phonology and grammar of Cantonese to help students improve their conversational and writing skills in Cantonese.
