= Hong Kong language =

Hong Kong language can refer to

- Languages of Hong Kong, the wide variety of languages used by different communities and racial groups in Hong Kong.
- Hong Kong Cantonese, the form of Cantonese spoken in Hong Kong, which is often known as the Hong Kong speech.
