= Languages of Hong Kong =

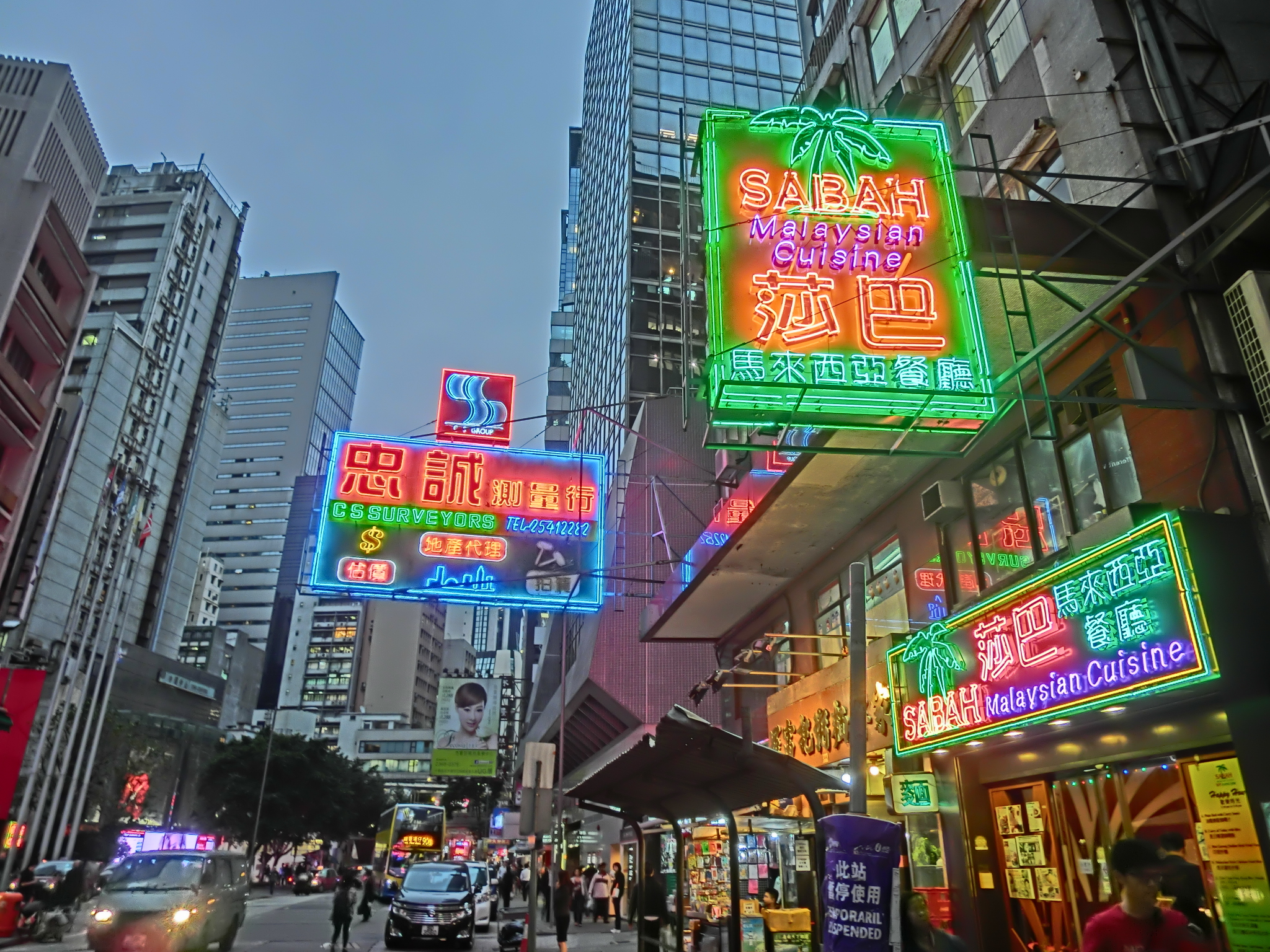
- English and Chinese signage on Queen's Road
- Official: Chinese, English
- Main: Hong Kong Cantonese, Hong Kong English
- Minority: Hakka, Southern Min (Hokkien, Teochew, Haklau), Mandarin, Shanghainese
- Immigrant: Filipino, Thai, Vietnamese, Indonesian, Japanese, Korean, Hindi, Urdu, Punjabi
- Foreign: French, German
- Signed: Hong Kong Sign Language
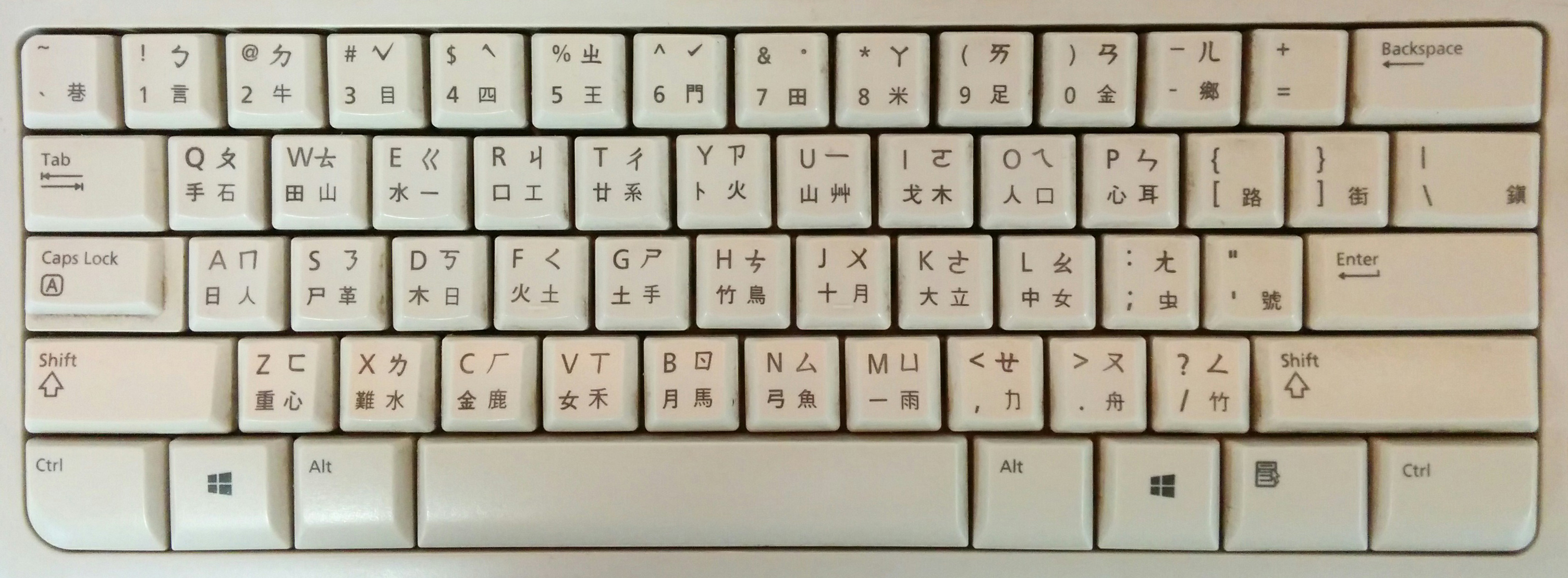
- Keyboard layout: QWERTY, Cangjie, Dayi, Bopomofo

During the British colonial era, English was the sole official language until 1974. Today, the Basic Law of Hong Kong states that English and Chinese are the two official languages of Hong Kong. All roads and government signs are bilingual, and both languages are used in academia, business and the courts, as well as in most government materials today.

According to the 2021 Hong Kong census, 93.7% of the population aged 5 or above could speak Cantonese, 58.7% could speak English, and 54.2% could speak Mandarin; in terms of usual spoken language, 88.2% of the population aged 5 and over spoke Cantonese, 4.6% spoke English and 2.3% spoke Mandarin.

== Official languages ==
Native languages of Hong Kong (2021)
Languages	percent
Cantonese (official)	88.2%
English (official)	4.6%
Mandarin	2.3%
Other Chinese varieties	2.8%
Other languages	2.1%

Language proficiency in Hong Kong (1996, 2016)
Language	Year	percent
Cantonese	1996	95.2%	−0.6%
Cantonese	2016	94.6%	−0.6%
English	1996	38.1%	+15%
English	2016	53.1%	+15%
Mandarin	1996	25.3%	+23.3%
Mandarin	2016	48.6%	+23.3%

English was the sole official language of Hong Kong from 1883 to 1974. Only after demonstrations and petitions from Hong Kong people demanding equal status for Chinese did the language become official in Hong Kong from 1974 onward. Annex I of the 1984 Sino-British Joint Declaration provided that English may be used in addition to Chinese for official purposes in the future Hong Kong Special Administrative Region. In March 1987, the Official Languages Ordinance was amended to require all new legislation to be enacted bilingually in both English and Chinese. In 1990, the Hong Kong Basic Law affirmed English's co-official language status with Chinese after the 1997 handover. No variety of Chinese has been specified to be official in Hong Kong, though it is usually understood to be spoken Cantonese and written vernacular Chinese.

== Chinese languages ==
As a result of immigration into Hong Kong from Guangdong, Cantonese is the dominant Chinese variant spoken in the territory with smaller numbers of speakers of other dialects. There are also numerous Chinese languages spoken by the native peoples of the New Territories, many of which are mutually unintelligible.

=== Written Chinese ===
The written language used in official and formal settings is written vernacular Chinese in Traditional Chinese characters. The local name for written Chinese is 書面語 (Jyutping: syu1 min2 jyu5; lit. 'Written language'), in contrast to 口語 (Jyutping: hau2 jyu5; lit. 'Spoken language'), i.e. Cantonese. This form of written Chinese must be distinguished from written Cantonese on the one hand and from Putonghua, the standard language/national variety of Mainland China, on the other. Thus it has also been called Hong Kong-style Chinese (Chinese: 港式中文; Jyutping: gong2 sik1 zung1 man4) to distinguish it from Putonghua. Although texts in Hong Kong-style Chinese are read in Cantonese phonology, its grammar and lexicon are largely derived from the Mandarin-based Modern Standard Chinese. Consequently, people proficient in other varieties of Standard Chinese, like Beijing Mandarin or Taiwanese Mandarin, are able to understand it at least in writing.

There is also a written language based on the vocabulary and grammar of spoken Cantonese known as written Cantonese. Although the "biliterate and trilingual" policy implies an absence of support for written Cantonese, it has gained popularity in news media where entertainment and local news are related. Written Cantonese is unintelligible to non-Cantonese speakers and is considered nonstandard by some educators despite its widespread usage in Hong Kong. Some have also credited written Cantonese for solving the challenges that standard written Chinese had faced in popular culture. As a written language, Cantonese became more popular with the boom of the Cantonese-language Hong Kong entertainment industry in the 1980s. Movie subtitles, magazines, popular literature, and comics have been published in written Cantonese. The publication of the Government Common Character Set (GCCS) in 1995 and the Hong Kong Supplementary Character Set (HKSCS) in 1999 by the Information Technology Services Department further helped with standardizing the Chinese character set used for writing Cantonese.

Simplified Chinese is seen in some posters, leaflets, flyers and signs in the tourist areas, but hold limited-to-no legal authority.

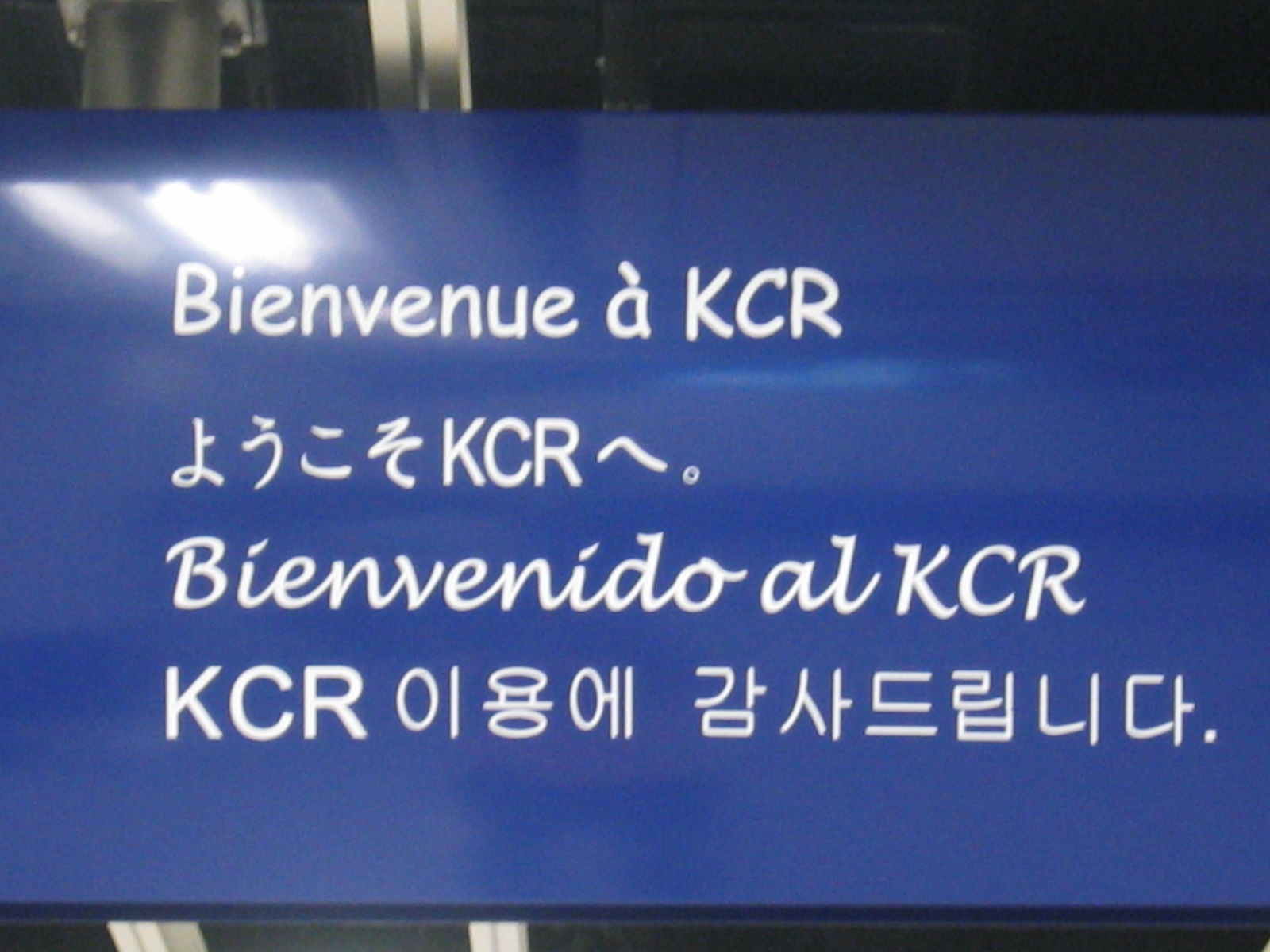
Part of a multilingual welcoming signboard at the former KCR East Tsim Sha Tsui station. (From the top: French, Japanese, Spanish and Korean).

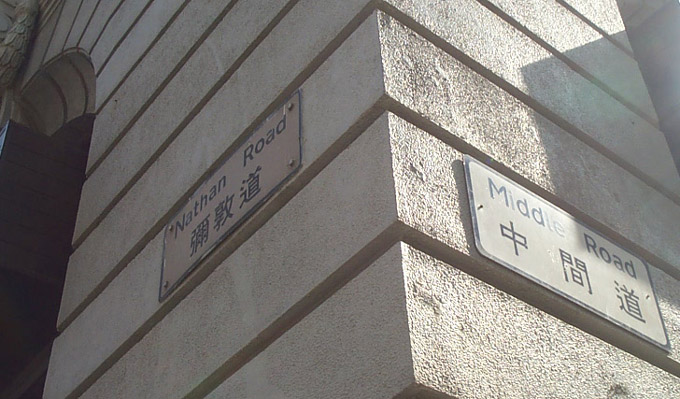
Road signs in Hong Kong are written in both Chinese and English.

=== Yue ===
The primary vernacular language of Hong Kong is standard Cantonese, spoken by 88.9% of the population. It is used in all areas of daily life, government, and administration. A few closely related dialects to standard Cantonese continue to be spoken in Hong Kong. Most notable is the Weitou dialect (圍頭話), which is mostly spoken by the older generation living in walled villages in New Territories. Additionally, the Tanka people (Chinese: 蜑家人, 疍家人, 水上人) from the fishing villages on outlying islands speak their own variant of Cantonese. However, this dialect is now largely limited to those middle aged and above. Taishanese came from migrants. The language can still be found in some areas in Hong Kong where migrants concentrated, such as Sai Wan.

=== Mandarin ===
When Hong Kong was a colony of the United Kingdom, Mandarin Chinese was not widely used in Hong Kong. With the establishment of the Republic of China in 1912, educational materials were imported into the then British colony and schools teaching Modern Standard Chinese, the official language of the Republic, were established there as well. Yet, due to the British colonial government favouring English over Chinese for most of its rule, there was not much official effort to further regulate the language.

Since the 1997 handover, the huge increase in inbound tourism from the mainland has led to much more widespread use of Mandarin, particularly in tourism-related commerce, though little impact has been seen in locally based commerce or public services.

In addition, the large number of soeng1 fei1 (雙非) children (children born in Hong Kong whose parents are both from the Mainland) has increased the number of Mandarin-speaking people, particularly in districts close to the border, such that Mandarin-speaking children make up large proportions or even the majority of primary-school students in those districts, causing the beginnings of a language shift in those areas.

=== Hakka ===
Hakka is indigenous to many villages in the New Territories and within Hakka communities in Hong Kong. Nowadays, outside these rural villages and older populations, younger Hakka Chinese populations communicate primarily in Cantonese.

=== Min ===
Hokkien (especially Quanzhou Hokkien), Teochew, and Haklau are the Southern Min varieties commonly found in Hong Kong. However, their usage is largely limited to the migrant families from the around the 20th century or so, especially the Cold War era after the communist takeover of China in 1949, to the 21st century, such as middle aged descendants of immigrants from native Chinese regions of these variants, specifically for Haklau speakers from Swabue, Teochew speakers from the Chaoshan (such as Chaozhou, Chaoyang, etc.) of Southeast Guangdong, and Hokkien speakers from Southern Fujian (such as Quanzhou, Xiamen, Zhangzhou) and Cold War era returnee migrants from Southeast Asia, such as the Philippines, Indonesia, Malaysia, Singapore, etc. since many of them migrated out to the aforementioned Southeast Asian countries during the late 20th century before the Handover of Hong Kong but some also remained or came back to Hong Kong, especially around North Point and nearby areas.

=== Wu ===
Shanghainese, or Wu Chinese in general, was commonly spoken by migrants who escaped Shanghai after the communist takeover of China in 1949. Their descendants assimilated into mainstream Cantonese-speaking society. However there is still a sizeable immigrant community after the reform and opening up in 1978, and about 1.1% of the population speaks Shanghainese according to a 2016 census.

== English ==
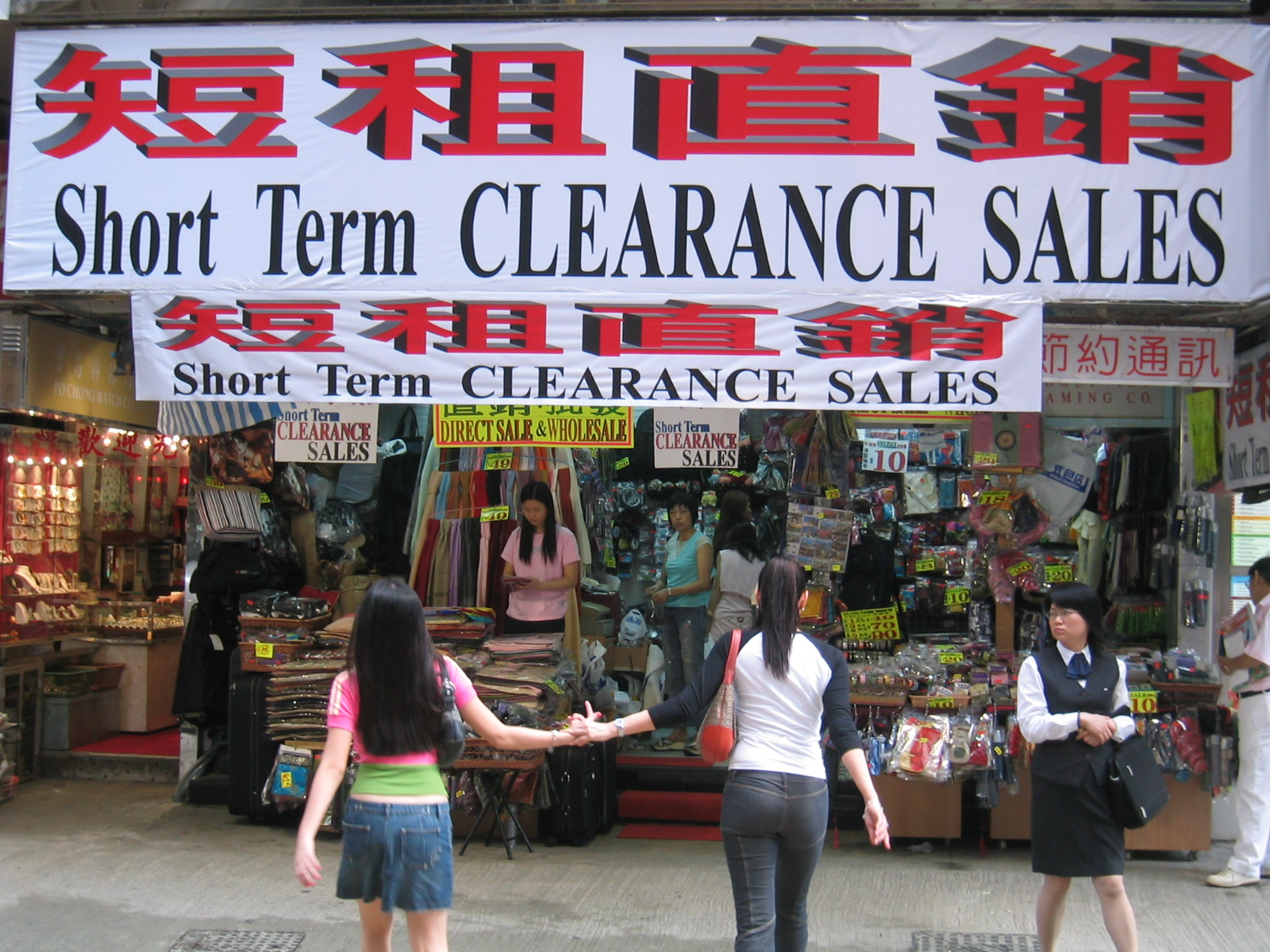
A bilingual sale banner hung in front of a shop in Causeway Bay.

English is a major working language in Hong Kong, and is widely used in commercial activities and legal matters. Although the sovereignty of Hong Kong was transferred to the PRC by the United Kingdom in 1997, English remains one of the official languages of Hong Kong as enshrined in the Basic Law.

=== Code-switching between Cantonese and English ===
Many Hong Kong people use both Cantonese and English, or "code-switch", in the same sentence when speaking. For example, "唓，都唔 make sense!" ("Wow, it does not make sense!"). The code-switching can freely mix English words and Chinese grammar, for instance "你 un 唔 understand?" ("Do you understand?") which follows the Chinese grammar syntax 'verb - not - verb' to ask "Do you (verb)?".

Some code-switched words are used so often that they have become loanwords in Cantonese, for example,

- "like", pronounced "lai-kee" /laːi^{55}kʰi^{35}/.
- "Partner", pronounced "pat-la" /pʰaːt̚^{55}laː^{21}/.
- "File", pronounced "fai-lo" /faːi^{55}lou^{35}/.
- "Number", pronounced "lum-ba" /lɐm^{55}pa^{35}/.
- "Case", pronounced "kei-see" /kʰei^{55}si^{35}/.

== Other spoken languages ==
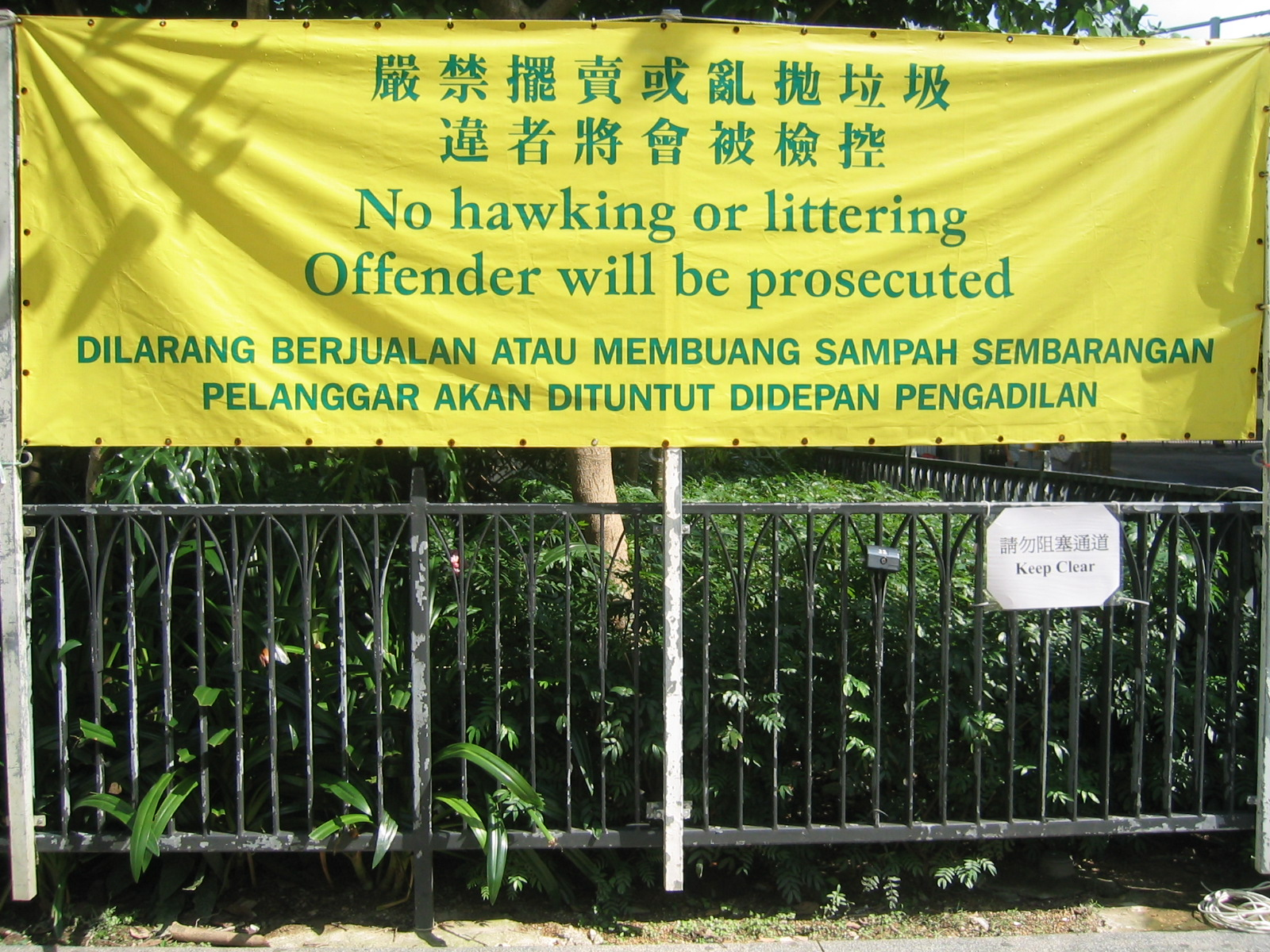
A trilingual sign in Chinese, English and Indonesian in Victoria Park

In addition, immigrants and expatriates from the West and other Asian countries have contributed much to Hong Kong's linguistic and demographic diversity. The geographical element of this diversity can be seen in the Hong Kong language maps, which shows oral languages from the 2011 Census, and oral and written languages from the 2016 Census. Statistics for the 27 self-reported spoken languages/dialects reported in the 2011 Census, can be found in the report: Language Use, Proficiency and Attitudes in Hong Kong and for the spoken and written languages in the 2016 By-Census in the report: The Contribution of Minority Languages and Dialects to Hong Kong’s Linguistic Landscape.

=== South Asian languages ===
In 2006, there were at least 44,744 persons of South Asian descent living in Hong Kong. Signboards written in Hindi or Urdu can be seen, and conversation in South Asian languages including Nepali, Sindhi and Punjabi, as well as Urdu, Hindi and Tamil can be heard.

Hong Kong has two Nepali language newspapers, The Everest and the Sunrise Weekly Hong Kong. In 2004, the Home Affairs Bureau and Metro Plus AM 1044 jointly launched radio shows Hong Kong-Pak Tonight in Urdu and Hamro Sagarmatha in Nepali.

The history of Indians in Hong Kong can be traced back to the early days of British Hong Kong. When the Union flag of the United Kingdom was hoisted on 26 January 1841, there were around 2,700 Indian troops that participated, and they played an important role in the development of Hong Kong in the early days. The most prominent contributions were the founding of the University of Hong Kong (HKU), the Hong Kong and Shanghai Banking Corporation (HSBC) and the Star Ferry.

Although nearly all of the Indian people who live in Hong Kong speak and write Indian English, some have maintained the usage of Hindi as a second language.

=== Japanese ===
There are over 25,000 Japanese people in Hong Kong, so it is not uncommon to hear Japanese conversations. More than 10,000 people in Hong Kong had taken the JLPT in 2005. Hong Kong-based R by R Production produces a television travel show set in Japan, which, as of April 2016, is broadcast on ViuTV. However, the language is often misused.

Japanese culture, especially popular culture, has been popular in Hong Kong for decades. Hong Kong people occasionally replace Chinese characters with Japanese kanji. In addition, the Companies Registry also permits the hiragana の ‘no’ in Chinese business names that are registered in Hong Kong. The hiragana の is usually used in place of the Chinese character 之 (Jyutping: zi1; Sidney Lau: ji^{1}) and is read as such in Hong Kong. In fact, Aji Ichiban has adopted の in their company name (優の良品).

The Japanese shinjitai kanji 駅, eki, has been used to substitute 站 (Jyutping: zaam6; Sidney Lau: jaam^{6}) (both 站 and 駅 mean "station" in their respective languages), as in Nu Front (東角駅), a shopping mall for Hong Kong youngsters in Causeway Bay. There are also some private estates named with the kanji 駅. The Japanese 駅 is the shinjitai of the hanzi 驛 (Jyutping: jik6; Sidney Lau: yik^{6}). However, 驛 has fallen out of usage to 站 in modern Cantonese and become obsolete. Therefore, it is not uncommon to mispronounce 駅 as its phonetic compound 尺 (Jyutping: cek3; Sidney Lau: chek^{3}).

=== Korean ===
Koreans in Hong Kong only make up a small minority (as of 2021, 1.4% of the ethnic minority population, equivalent to 0.12%) of the population, while Korean culture has been gaining popularity through the hallyu since the early 2000s. Korean pop music was the first Korean media to enter Hong Kong's market. Since then, several Korean TV series such as Dae Jang Geum have been broadcast to numerous audiences. There are roughly 1,000 students that took Korean courses at the Chinese University of Hong Kong each year, including undergraduates as well as professionals who enrolled in continuing education programs. Roughly 3,000 people took the Test of Proficiency in Korean in the period starting from its introduction to Hong Kong in 2003 until 2009. Surveys and statistics from course enrolments have shown that nine-tenths of the students studying Korean in Hong Kong are female.

As of 2025, Korean is available as a category 3 elective language subject for HKDSE, and in a 2022 survey, was found to be the second most widely studied foreign language at secondary school in Hong Kong, although in practice the subject is taken mostly in after-school classes. For Korean families resident in Hong Kong, the Korean International School of Hong Kong in Sai Wan Ho offers an educational curriculum using the Korean language as the medium of instruction.

=== French ===
As of 2022, French is the third most studied foreign language after Japanese and Korean. Many institutions in Hong Kong, like Alliance française, provide French courses. Local universities, such as the University of Hong Kong, the Chinese University of Hong Kong and Hong Kong Baptist University, offer programmes which aim at developing proficiency in French language and culture. The language was included as a subject in the HKCEE, but not in HKALE, the two former public exams that Hong Kong high school students took before the year 2012, with accordance to British International General Certificate of Secondary Education (IGCSE) standards. The IGCSE French syllabus used by the University of Cambridge Local Examinations Syndicate (UCLES) had been adopted in the examination. The post-2012 equivalent, the HKDSE, continues to offer French as a category C subject.

The only French book store, Librairie Parentheses, in Hong Kong is located on Wellington Street, Central.

Real estate developers in Hong Kong sometimes name their buildings in French, such as Bel-Air, Les Saisons and Belle Mer. This kind of foreign branding is also used in boutiques and restaurants. An example is Yucca de Lac in Ma Liu Shui. Sometimes only French elements such as articles and prepositions are added to the name, as in the case of the restaurant chain Café de Coral. Similar mixing of English and French can be seen on the menu of Délifrance, a French-style restaurant chain in Hong Kong.

=== German ===
The number of German speakers in Hong Kong is about 5 thousand, significant enough for the establishment of the German Swiss International School (Deutsch-Schweizerische Internationale Schule), which claims to number more than 1,000 students, at The Peak of Hong Kong Island. Many institutions in Hong Kong provide German courses. The most well-known one is the Goethe-Institut, which is located in Wan Chai. After spending a certain period in learning German, students can take the German Test as a Foreign Language (Test Deutsch als Fremdsprache; TestDaF for short) and Start German A1-C2. There are currently two test centres for TestDaF in Hong Kong: the Goethe-Institut and the Hong Kong Baptist University(HKBU). The latter one also offers a European Studies degree course of German Stream, Bachelor of Social Science in European Studies (German Stream), in parallel with the French stream. A minor programme of German is offered at the Language Centre of HKBU. The Hong Kong University offers a Major in German. The Chinese University of Hong Kong offers a Minor in German and popular summer courses. The Hong Kong University of Science and Technology offers German for science and technology.

=== Filipino ===
Filipino (Tagalog) and other Philippine languages are used by Filipinos in Hong Kong, most of whom are employed as foreign domestic workers.

Newspapers and magazines in Filipino can also be easily found in Central, Hong Kong. There are also a small number of churches in Hong Kong that have masses or services in Filipino, for example the afternoon masses provided by the St. John's Cathedral in Central.

=== Indonesian ===
Indonesian is the common language for the significant number of Indonesians working in Hong Kong, though Javanese is also widely spoken. Most are domestic workers; On their days off, they often gather at Victoria Park in Causeway Bay where Indonesian languages can be heard.

=== Thai ===
Thai prevails among the Thai population in Hong Kong, who mostly work as domestic workers. The Thai language is found in many shops and restaurants owned by Thais in Kowloon City. A number of Thai movies have been imported since the early 2000s, such as The Wheel in the medley Three, Jan Dara, the Iron Ladies, My Little Girl, and Ong-Bak: Muay Thai Warrior and Tom-Yum-Goong starring Tony Jaa.

=== Vietnamese ===
Vietnamese is used in Hong Kong among the ethnic Chinese from Vietnam who had initially settled in Vietnam and returned to Hong Kong. The language is also used by Vietnamese refugees who left their home during the Vietnam War.

=== Arabic ===
Arabic is used frequently among members of Muslim communities in Hong Kong. Some Islamic organisations do teach the language as well, but the current status can best be described as developing.

== Sign language ==
Hong Kong Sign Language is used by the deaf community of Hong Kong; it is derived from the southern dialect of Chinese Sign Language, but is now an independent, mutually unintelligible language.

== See also ==
- Bilingualism in Hong Kong
- Code-switching in Hong Kong
- Debate on traditional and simplified Chinese characters
- Hong Kong Cantonese
- Hong Kong English
- Hong Kong Sign Language

== Bibliography ==
- Bruce, Nigel (1996). Language in Hong Kong Education & Society: A Bibliography
- Pennington, Martha C. ed. (1998). Language in Hong Kong at Century's End. Hong Kong: Hong Kong University Press. ISBN 962-209-418-X.
- Dickson, Peter; Alister Cumming, eds. (1996). "Hong Kong Language Policy". National Profiles of Language Education in 25 Countries (PDF). Berkshire, England: National Foundation for Educational Research. Archived from the original (PDF) on 19 December 2005.
- Law Drafting Division (1998). "Interpretation of Bilingual Legislation – A Paper Discussing Cases Where the Two Language Texts of an Enactment are Alleged to be Different" – via Hong Kong e-Legislation.
