= Chaak-Ming Lau =

Hong Kong educator

Academic background
- Education: University of Hong Kong (MPhil); Chinese University of Hong Kong (PhD)
- Thesis: On the Structure of Sentential Periphery from the Perspective of Cantonese Sentence-Final Particle 'ah' (2019)
- Doctoral advisor: Sze-Wing Tang

Academic work
- Discipline: Linguistics; Digital humanities
- Institutions: Education University of Hong Kong

Chinese name
- Traditional Chinese: 劉擇明
- Simplified Chinese: 刘择明
Transcriptions
Standard Mandarin
- Hanyu Pinyin: Liú Zémíng
Yue: Cantonese
- Jyutping: lau4 zaak6 ming4
- Website: https://chaak.net/

Chaak-Ming Lau (Chinese: 劉擇明; Jyutping: Lau4 Zaak6 Ming4) is a linguist from Hong Kong. He is a professor of the Department of Linguistics and Modern Language Studies at the Education University of Hong Kong since 2020 and president of the Linguistic Society of Hong Kong. He received his PhD in Chinese Language and Literature from the Chinese University of Hong Kong in 2019. He started several projects providing digital resources for Cantonese, including the online dictionary words.hk and the keyboard input software TypeDuck.
