= HKWC =

HKWC may refer to:

- Hong Kong West Cluster, hospital cluster under the Hospital Authority in Hong Kong
- Hong Kong written Chinese
