= Proper Cantonese pronunciation =

Movement to teach "correct" Cantonese pronunciation in Hong Kong

Proper Cantonese pronunciation (Chinese: 粵語正音運動; Jyutping: jyut6 jyu5 zing3 jam1 wan6 dung6) is a campaign in Hong Kong started from the 1980s and led by scholar Richard Ho (何文匯) to promote the "proper pronunciation" in the Cantonese language. The prescriptive nature of the campaign has led to controversies.

== Origins and influences ==
The very idea of proper pronunciation of Cantonese is controversial, since the concept of labeling native speakers' usage and speech in terms of correctness is not generally supported by linguistics. Law et al. (2001) point out that the phrase 懶音 laan5 jam1 "lazy sounds," most commonly discussed in relation to phonetic changes in Hong Kong Cantonese, implies that the speaker is unwilling to put forth sufficient effort to articulate the standard pronunciation.

The promotion of proper Cantonese pronunciation is partly in reaction to sound changes found in younger people's speech. These include:

1. merge of initial n- and l-, for example, pronouncing 男 (naam4) as 藍 (laam4)
2. merge of initial ng- and dark-toned null/glottal onsets, for example, pronouncing 愛 (oi3) as ngoi3
3. loss of initial ng- on light-toned words, for example, pronouncing 我 (ngo5) as o5
4. omission of the labialization -w- of gw- or kw-, for example, pronouncing 國 (gwok3) as 角 (gok3)
5. confusing the final consonants -k and -t, for example, pronouncing 塞 (sak1) as 失 (sat1).
6. confusing the final consonants -n and -ng, for example, pronouncing 冷 (laang5) as 懶 (laan5)
7. confusing the syllabic consonants m and ng, for example, pronouncing 吳 (ng4) as 唔 (m4)

The nine attested phonetic sound changes in Hong Kong Cantonese, or "lazy sounds", in the format of the International Phonetic Alphabet (IPA) can be tracked in the following table:

Context	Sound change or phonetic variation	Examples	Origins
Syllable-initial position	1. [n-] > [l-]	男 "boy" [naːm4] > [laːm4]	First appeared in speech in the early 1940s when it was found that there was a new (non-standard) pronunciation for original syllable-initial [n-]. This became increasingly common in the 1970s.
Syllable-initial position	2. [ŋ-] > ∅-	牛 "cow" [ŋɐu4] > [ɐu4]	H.N. Cheung discovered that [ŋ-] can be added in syllable-initial positions preceding syllable-initial vowels [a, ɐ, ɔ, o] in standard Cantonese. This became overused and preferred for words which originally had either syllable-initial [ŋ-] or syllable-initial ∅- until at least the early 1970s.
Syllable-initial position	3. ∅- > [ŋ-]	屋 "house" [ʊk] > [ŋʊk]	H.N. Cheung discovered that [ŋ-] can be added in syllable-initial positions preceding syllable-initial vowels [a, ɐ, ɔ, o] in standard Cantonese. This became overused and preferred for words which originally had either syllable-initial [ŋ-] or syllable-initial ∅- until at least the early 1970s.
Before /ɔ/	4. [kʷ-] > [k] OR [kʷʰ-] > [kʰ-]	果 "fruit" [kʷɔ2] > [kɔ2]	This phenomenon of the disappearing process of labialization in a syllable-initial environment and preceding the vowel [ɔ] was first mentioned and studied by H.N. Cheung in the 1970s.
Individual syllable	5. Syllabic [ŋ̍] > [m̩]	五 "five" [ŋ̍5] > [m̩5]	Syllabic [ŋ̍] was suggested to have originated from the syllable [ŋu], while [m̩] was found in colloquial forms of dialects. This change remained intact in the first half of the twentieth century.
Syllable-final position	6. [-ŋ] > [-n]	香(蕉) "banana" [hœŋ1] > [hœn1]	First appeared in R.S. Bauer's 1979 study presenting the discovery of alveolarization (or fronting) in syllable-final [-ŋ] that becomes [-n]. The phenomenon of alveolarization started to grow in the 1950s.
Syllable-final position	7. [-n] > [-ŋ]	乾 "dry" [kɔn1] > [kɔŋ1]	The phenomenon of velarization was only found in the 1970s.
Syllable-final position	8. [-k] > [-t]	腳 "foot" [kœk8] > [kœt8]	The phenomenon of velarization was only found in the 1970s.
Syllable-final position	9. [-t] > [-k]	渴 "thirsty" [hɔt8] > [hɔk8]	The phenomenon of velarization was only found in the 1970s.

To, Mcleod and Cheung delve deeper into these sound changes in contemporary Hong Kong Cantonese, and focus in particular on the four syllable-final consonants: [-ŋ], [-n], [-k], and [-t]. After conducting original research on the pronunciation of words containing these syllable-final phonetic changes, To et al. argue that syllable-final environment sound changes occur due to the tongue position at the preceding vowel, as it opts for maximum ease. Thus, their argument attests for two process: alveolarization (occurring in [-ŋ] > [-n]transitions and [-k] > [-t] transitions) and velarization (occurring in [-n] > [-ŋ] transitions and [-t] > [-k] transitions).

The following table shows the environments where the processes of alveolarization and velarization tend to occur:

Sound change	Environment	Description
[-ŋ] > [-n] and [-k] > [-t]	/ {ɛ, œ, ɐ, a}___#	Alveolarization is facilitated by a preceding mid-front/central vowel.
[-n] > [-ŋ] and [-t] > [-k]	/ ɔ___#	Velarization may occur when preceded by mid-back vowel [ɔ].
[-ŋ] (no change) and [-k] (no change)	/ {ɪ, ʊ}___#	The originally attested syllable-final velar consonants are not alveolarized when preceded by the high, front, lax vowel [ɪ] and the near-close near-back rounded vowel [ʊ].

Alveolarization tends to occur when there is a preceding mid-front or central vowel, and velarization tends to occur when the attested preceding mid-back vowel [ɔ] is present. The last example in table 2 indicates that the attested [ɪŋ] sequence does not change, as the position of the tongue for the high, lax, front vowel is already in close proximity to the position needed to make the velar consonants.

To et al.'s research presents that the process of co-articulation accounts for the birth of lazy sounds. In Hong Kong Cantonese at present, alveolarization is a more popular phenomenon than velarization, and the syllable-final alveolar consonants [-n] and [-t] tend to be preserved even when the preceding vowels prompt a tongue position that is further back. An example would be “dry” [kɔn]. It is rare for people to pronounce this with a syllable-final [-ŋ], although it still occurs, as 7.1% of adults tested by To et al. do this.

This result is presented alongside a ranking of attested preceding vowels of the [-ŋ]~[-n] pair that demonstrate the process of alveolarization, from least likely to have a succeeding alveolarized consonant, to most likely: ʊ = ɪ > ɔ < ɛ < ɐ < a < œ. The vowels [ʊ] and [ɪ] share the same percentage of alveolarization, resulting in a 0.0% chance of sound change, while the highest ranking vowel, [œ], resulted in a 37.5% chance of sound change.

TV and radio programs, including game shows, have been made to promote proper pronunciation. The campaign has also influenced the local media. Some news reporters and masters of ceremonies in Hong Kong have adopted the proper pronunciations.

== Arguments ==
The proper readings promoted by Richard Ho are based on the fanqie spelling of Guangyun, an ancient rime dictionary reflecting the sounds of Middle Chinese. Ho states that, Cantonese phonology being the descendant of the Guangyun system, there are highly regular correspondences between the sounds of Middle Chinese and those of modern Cantonese. He also holds that the flat (平) and sharp (仄) tonal distinction in Middle Chinese is the most important feature from which modern Cantonese should not deviate, especially when reciting ancient literature. He allows exceptions in some cases of colloquial speech, but not in any cases in reading ancient literature.

Ho's approach to pronunciation is prescriptive. For instance, talking about the wrong pronunciation of final consonants of the youth, he says:

In general, today's youth pronounces the final consonants in the wrong way because they have, since childhood, unconsciously imitated the wrong pronunciations of the broadcasters and artists, and those of their seniors and friends. Fortunately, there are still some families which insist on proper pronunciation. Therefore, the wrong pronunciations have not spread to the whole society, and there is still a ray of hope to right the wrongs. (現在，一般年輕人錯誤的韻尾發音，主要是從小不自覺模仿播音員、藝員、長輩或朋輩的錯誤發音所造成的。幸好有些家庭堅守發音要正確的原則，這種錯誤發音才不至於擴散到整個社會，使撥亂反正仍有一線希望。) (Ho 2001:33)

He expresses his attitude towards sound changes, when talking about the gradual merge of [n-] and [l-] initials in Cantonese:

Regarding sound changes, we can study them objectively. When the changes are fixed, there is no need to restore them. Now if [n-] and [l-] have already merged, a change is impossible. But the fact is [n-] has yet to disappear in Cantonese. More and more people are pronouncing [n-] as [l-] only because of the bad influences of some language teachers and broadcasters, who inadvertently made the mistake. We still can, and should, correct the error. (我們硏究語音的變化，可以客觀地研究變化的現象。變化定了，也無須刻意去回復舊觀。所以，如果現在粵音[n-]已和[l-]相混，那也沒辦法。但目前情況卻非如此，[n-]在粵音中並未消失。越來越多人所以把[n-]讀成[l-]，只不過是一些把[n-]讀成[l-]的語文敎師和廣播員無意中造成的不良影響而已。現在要改正過來是絕對可以的，也是我們應該盡力去做的。) (Ho 1995:154–155)

A major critic of Ho's approach is Wong Ting Tze. He calls Ho's prescriptive pronunciations demonic. One of his concerns is that Cantonese comprises six historical strata, not just the one represented by the Guangyun.

== Media ==
Ever since the arguments made around the correct way of pronouncing Chinese characters in Cantonese, different media companies in China have used their own interpretation of the correct pronunciations when broadcasting.

=== Effects outside Hong Kong ===
Changes in pronunciation in Hong Kong Cantonese have affected the Cantonese spoken in other regions such as Guangdong and Guangxi provinces, and in colloquial Malaysian Cantonese.

Variations in Cantonese pronunciation across different regions are still a major topic of discussion. Some are seen as too informal while others are seen as having other flaws.

== See also ==
- Cantonese phonology
