= Malaysian Cantonese =

Variety of Cantonese spoken in Malaysia

- 馬來西亞廣東話
- Native to: Malaysia
- Region: Perak, Pahang, Negeri Sembilan, Klang Valley, Sabak Bernam, Sarikei, Sandakan
- Ethnicity: Malaysian Chinese
- Language family: Sino-Tibetan: Sinitic; Chinese; Yue; Yuehai; Cantonese; Malaysian Cantonese
- Writing system: Chinese characters (Written Cantonese)

Language codes
- ISO 639-3: –
- Glottolog: None
- IETF: yue-MY

Malaysian Cantonese
- Traditional Chinese: 馬來西亞廣東話
- Jyutping: Maa5loi4sai1aa3 Gwong2dung1waa2
Transcriptions
Standard Mandarin
- Hanyu Pinyin: Mǎláixīyà Guángdōnghuà
Yue: Cantonese
- Yale Romanization: Máhlòihsāia Gwóngdūngwá
- Jyutping: Maa5loi4sai1aa3 Gwong2dung1waa2
Southern Min
- Hokkien POJ: Má-lâi-se-a Kńg-tang-ōa / Má-lâi-se-a Kńg-tang-ōe
- Tâi-lô: Má-lâi-se-a Kńg-tang-uā / Má-lâi-se-a Kńg-tang-uē

Alternative name
- Traditional Chinese: 馬來西亞廣府話
- Jyutping: Maa5loi4sai1aa3 Gwong2fu2waa2
Transcriptions
Standard Mandarin
- Hanyu Pinyin: Mǎláixīyà Guǎngfǔhuà
Yue: Cantonese
- Yale Romanization: Máhlòihsāia Gwóngfúwá
- Jyutping: Maa5loi4sai1aa3 Gwong2fu2waa2
Southern Min
- Hokkien POJ: Má-lâi-se-a Kóng-hú-ōa / Má-lâi-se-a Kóng-hú-ōe
- Tâi-lô: Má-lâi-se-a Kóng-hú-uā / Má-lâi-se-a Kóng-hú-uē

Malay name
- Malay: Bahasa Kantonis / Bahasa Konghu

Malaysian Cantonese (Chinese: 馬來西亞廣東話; Jyutping: maa5 loi4 sai1 aa3 gwong2 dung1 waa2) is a local variety of Cantonese spoken in Malaysia. It is the lingua franca among Chinese throughout much of the central portion of Peninsular Malaysia, being spoken in the capital Kuala Lumpur, Perak (Kinta Valley, Batang Padang, Hulu Perak, Kuala Kangsar, Bagan Datoh, Hilir Perak and Perak Tengah), Pahang, Selangor, Putrajaya and Negeri Sembilan, it is also widely understood to varying degrees by many Chinese people throughout the country, regardless of their ancestral language.

Malaysian Cantonese is not uniform throughout the country, with variation between individuals and areas. It is mutually intelligible with Cantonese spoken in both Hong Kong and Guangzhou in mainland China but has distinct differences in vocabulary and pronunciation which make it unique.

== Geographic spread ==
Green indicates areas where Minnan (Including Hokkien & Teochew) predominates; Orange indicates areas where Cantonese predominates; Light blue indicates areas where Hakka predominates; Purple indicates areas where multiple languages predominate.

Cantonese is widely spoken besides Malaysian Mandarin in the capital Kuala Lumpur and throughout much of the surrounding Klang Valley (Petaling Jaya, Gombak, Ampang, Cheras, Rawang, Putrajaya, Selayang, Sungai Buloh, Puchong, Shah Alam, Kajang, Bangi, Semenyih and Subang Jaya) excluding Klang itself where Hokkien predominates. It is also widely spoken in the town of Sekinchan in the Sabak Bernam district of northern Selangor. It is also used or widely spoken in northeast and central areas as well as parts of southern Perak, especially in the state capital Ipoh and the surrounding towns of the Kinta Valley region (Gopeng, Batu Gajah and Kampar) as well as the towns of Tapah and Bidor in the Batang Padang district of southern Perak and to a lesser extent in the districts of Kuala Kangsar, Perak Tengah, Hilir Perak, Bagan Datoh and Hulu Perak (Cantonese of Kwongsai origins from Guangxi). In Pahang, it is spoken in the state capital town of Kuantan and also widely found or spoken amongst the local Chinese populace in other districts such as Raub, Maran, Jerantut, Bentong, Rompin, Kuala Lipis, Bera, Pekan, Temerloh and Cameron Highlands. Cantonese is also spoken throughout most of Negeri Sembilan, particularly in the state capital Seremban (but a lesser extent also widely spoken by the local Chinese in other towns of the state such as Jempol, Kuala Pilah, Tampin, Rembau, Port Dickson, Gemas and also Bahau with a special exception in Jelebu, where the Hakka dialect predominates mostly along with the towns of Nilai and Mantin, which are outer suburbs of Seremban city). It is widely spoken in Sandakan, Sabah and Cantonese speakers can also be found in other areas such as Segamat, Johor, Keningau, Sabah, Sarikei, Sarawak, Batu Pahat, Johor, Miri, Sarawak, Mersing, Johor and Kanowit, Sarawak.

Due to its predominance in the capital city, Cantonese is highly influential in local Chinese-language media and is used in commerce by Malaysian Chinese. As a result, Cantonese is widely understood and spoken with varying fluency by Chinese throughout Malaysia, regardless of their language group. This is in spite of Hokkien being the most widely spoken variety and Mandarin being the medium of education at Chinese-language schools. The widespread influence of Cantonese is also due in large part to the popularity of Hong Kong media, particularly TVB dramas.

== Phonology ==
A sizeable portion of Malaysian Cantonese speakers, including native speakers, are not of Cantonese ancestry, with many belonging to different ancestral language groups such as Hakka, Hokkien and Teochew. The historical and continued influence of their original language has produced variation and change in the pronunciation of particular sounds in Malaysian Cantonese when compared to "standard" Cantonese. Depending on their ancestral origin and educational background, some speakers may not exhibit the unique characteristics described below.

- Many Malaysians have difficulty with the ⟨oe⟩ sound and will substitute it with other sounds where it occurs. Often these changes brings the pronunciation of most words in line with their Hakka pronunciation, and for many words their Hokkien pronunciations as well.
  - Words that end with ⟨-oeng⟩ & ⟨-oek⟩ (pronounced [œːŋ] & [œːk̚] in standard Cantonese) such as 香 hoeng1, 兩 loeng5, 想 soeng2 and 著 zoek3, 腳 goek3, 約 joek3 may be pronounced as [iɔŋ]/[eɔŋ] and [iɔk̚]/[eɔk̚], which by local spelling conventions may be written as ⟨-iong/-eong⟩ and ⟨-iok/-eok⟩ respectively, e.g. 香 hiong1/heong1, 兩 liong5/leong5, 想 siong2/seong2 and 著 ziok3/zeok3, 腳 giok3/geok3, 約 jiok3/jeok3. This change brings the pronunciation of most words in line with their Hakka pronunciation, and for many words their Hokkien pronunciations as well.
  - Words with final ⟨-eon⟩ & ⟨-eot⟩ (pronounced [ɵn] & [ɵt̚] in "Standard" Cantonese) such as 春 ceon1 and 出 ceot1 may be pronounced as ⟨-un⟩ [un] & ⟨-ut⟩ [ut̚] respectively.
  - Words with final ⟨-eoi⟩ (pronounced [ɵɥ] in "Standard" Cantonese) such as 水 seoi2 and 去 heoi3 may be pronounced as ⟨-oi⟩ [ɔi], ⟨-ui⟩ [ui] or even ⟨-ei⟩ [ei] depending on the word.
- Many Malaysians also have difficulty with the ⟨yu⟩ sound (pronounced as [yː] in Standard Cantonese) which occurs in words such as 豬 zyu1, 算 syun3, 血 hyut3. This sound may be substituted with [iː], which in the case of some words may involve palatalisation of the preceding initial [◌ʲiː].
- Some speakers, particularly non-native speakers, may not differentiate between long and short vowels, such as between ⟨aa⟩ [aː] and ⟨a⟩ [ɐ].
- Due to the influence of Hong Kong media, Malaysian Cantonese is also affected by so-called "Lazy Sounds" (懶音 laan5 jam1), though to a much lesser degree than Hong Kong Cantonese.
  - Many younger and middle-aged speakers pronounce some ⟨n-⟩ initial words with an ⟨l-⟩ initial. For many, this process is not complete, with the initial ⟨n-/l-⟩ distinction maintained for other words. e.g. 你 nei5 → lei5.
  - Generally, the ⟨ng-⟩ initial has been maintained, unlike in Hong Kong where it is being increasingly dropped and replaced with the null initial. Instead, among some speakers, Malaysian Cantonese exhibits the addition of the ⟨ng-⟩ initial for some words that originally have a null initial. This also occurs in Hong Kong Cantonese as a form of hypercorrection of "Lazy Sounds", e.g. 亞 aa3 → ngaa3.
  - Some speakers have lost labialisation of the ⟨gw-⟩ & ⟨kw-⟩ initials, instead pronouncing them as ⟨g-⟩ & ⟨k-⟩, e.g. 國 gwok3 → gok3.
- Some tones may be merged together, that is they aren't differentiated in regular speech.
  - The 5th tone may be merged with the 2nd tone.
  - The 6th tone may be merged with the 4th tone.
  - The 5th tone may be merged with the 3rd tone, with examples such as "你 nei5" being pronounced as "nei3" and "我 ngo5" being pronounced as "ngo3".

== Vocabulary ==
Malaysian Cantonese is in contact with many other Chinese languages such as Hakka, Hokkien and Teochew as well other languages such as Malay and English. As a result, it has absorbed many loanwords and expressions that may not be found in Cantonese spoken elsewhere. Malaysian Cantonese also preserves some vocabulary that would be considered old-fashioned or unusual in Hong Kong but may be preserved in other Cantonese speaking areas such as Guangzhou. Not all of the examples below are used throughout Malaysia, with differences in vocabulary between different Cantonese speaking areas such as Ipoh, Kuala Lumpur and Sandakan. There may also be differences based on the speaker's educational background and native dialect.

- Use of 愛/唔愛 oi3/m4 oi3 instead of 要/唔要 jiu3/m4 jiu3 to refer to "want/don't want", also meaning "love/like". Also used in Guangzhou and is similar to the character's usage in Hakka.
- Use of 唔愛 m4 oi3 instead of 唔好 m4 hou2 to refer to "don't".
- More common use of 曉 hiu2 to mean "to be able to/to know how to", whereas 會 wui6/識 sik1 would be more commonly used in Hong Kong. Also used in Guangzhou and is similar to the character's usage to Hakka.
- Use of 包粟 baau1 suk1 to mean "corn/maize", whereas 粟米 suk1 mai5 would be more commonly used in Hong Kong. Similar to the character's usage in Hakka.
- Use of 冇 mou5 at the end of sentences to create questions, e.g. 你愛食飯冇? nei5 oi3 sik6 faan6 mou5?, "Do you want to eat?"
- Some expressions have undergone a change in meaning, such as 仆街 puk1 gaai1, literally "fall on the street" which is commonly used in Malaysia to mean "broke/bankrupt" and is sometimes not considered a profanity, unlike in Hong Kong where it is used to mean "drop dead/go to hell".
- Some English educated speakers may use 十千 sap6 cin1 instead of 萬 maan6 to express 10,000, e.g. 14,000 might be expressed as 十四千 sap6 sei3 cin1 instead of 一萬四 jat1 maan6 sei3.
- Use of expressions which would sound outdated to speakers in Hong Kong, e.g. 冇相干 mou5 soeng1 gon1 to mean "never mind/it doesn't matter", whereas 冇所謂 mou5 so2 wai6/唔緊要 m4 gan2 jiu3 would be more commonly used in Hong Kong. Some of these expressions are still currently in use in Guangzhou.
- Word order, particularly the placement of certain grammatical particles may differ, e.g. 食飯咗 sik6 faan6 zo2 instead of 食咗飯 sik6 zo2 faan6 for "have eaten."
- Unique expression's such as 我幫你講 ngo5 bong1 nei5 gong2 to mean "I'm telling you" where 我同你講 ngo5 tung4 nei5 gong2/我話你知 ngo5 waa6 nei5 zi1 would be used in Hong Kong.
- Malaysian Cantonese is also characterised by the extensive use of sentence ending particles, to an even greater extent than which occurs in Hong Kong Cantonese.

Loanwords
Malaysian Cantonese	Meaning	Hong Kong Cantonese Equivalent	Notes
擺 baai2	Number of times	次 ci3	From Hokkien pái (擺)
蘇嗎 sou1 maa1	All	全部 cyun4 bou6 ham6 baang6 laang6	From Malay semua, many potential pronunciations e.g. su1 mua1
巴剎 baa3 saat1	Market	街市 gaai1 si5	From Malay pasar, originally from Persian bazaar
馬打 maa3 daa1	Police	警察 ging2 caat3	From Malay mata-mata
馬打寮 maa3 daa1 liu2	Police Station	警署, ging2 cyu5	
扮𠮨 baan3 naai1	Clever	聰明 cung1 ming4/叻 lek1	From Malay pandai
千猜 cin1 caai1	Whatever/Casually	是但 si6 daan6	From Hokkien chhìn-chhái (清彩), also used in Malay as cincai
軋爪 gaat3 zaau1	To Annoy	煩 faan4	From Malay kacau
Sinang sin3 naang1	Easy	容易 jung4 ji6	From Malay senang
Loti lo4 di1	Bread	麵包 min6 baau1	From Malay roti, itself from Tamil ரொட்டி, ultimately from Sanskrit रोटी
Kopi go3 bi1	Coffee	咖啡 gaa1 fe1	From Malay kopi, itself from English coffee
pui1	To spit	𦧲 loe1	From Hokkien phùi (呸)
鐳 lui1/leoi1	Money	錢 cin4	From Malay duit or Hokkien lui (鐳), themselves from Dutch "duit"
箍 kau1	Classifier for money	蚊 man1	Related to Hokkien kho (箍)
黃梨 wong4 laai2*	Pineapple	菠蘿 bo1 lo4	Pronunciation differs, alluding to the yellow colour of a pineapple
弓蕉 gung1 ziu1	Banana	香蕉 hoeng1 ziu1	Alluding to the curved, bow shape of a banana
嫽 liu4	To go on holiday	去度假 heoi3 dou6 gaa3	From Hakka liau
啦啦 laa4 laa1	Clam	蜆 hin2	From local Hokkien 蜊蜊 lâ-lâ, a reduplication of Minnan 蜊 lâ, also used in Malay as lala
腳車 goek3 ce1	Bicycle	單車 daan1 ce1	Based on Hokkien kha-chhia (跤車)
摩哆 mo3 do1	Motorcycle	電單車 din6 daan1 ce1	From English motorcycle
三萬 saam1 maan6	Fine/Penalty	罰款 fat6 fun2	From Malay saman, itself from English summons
泵質 bung1 zat1	Punctured	爆胎 baau3 toi1	From English punctured
禮申 lai5 san1	Licence	車牌 ce1 paai4	From English licence
多籠 do1 lung4	Beg/Please	求下 kau4 haa6	From Malay tolong
啲飲 di4 jam4	Keep Quiet	收聲 sau1 seng1	From Malay diam. False cognate of Hokkien tiâm (恬)
呔也 taai1 jaa2	Tyre	輪胎 leon4 toi1	From English tyre
撚屎撚樣 lan2 si2 lan2 joeng6	Arrogant	巴閉 baa1 bai3	From Hakka lín sṳ́ lín yong
浸水 zam3 seoi2	Flood	水浸 seoi2 zam3	From Hakka chim súi
龍根 lung4 kang1	Drain	坑渠 haang1 keoi4	From Malay longkang, itself from Hokkien lóng kau (壟溝)
插電 or Charge 電caap3 din6 or Charge din6	Recharge Battery	叉電 caa1 din6 / 充電 cung1 din6	
大撚戇 daai6 lan2 ngong6	Very stupid person	戇居仔 ngong6 geoi1 zai2	From Hakka 大𡳞戇 thai lín ngong
喷 pan5	Thick	厚 hau5	From Hakka 笨 phûn

Examples of Unique Vocabulary
Malaysian Cantonese	Meaning	Hong Kong Cantonese Equivalent	Notes
雷 leoi4	Dumb	蠢 ceon2	From 𡚗, as in "大隻𡚗𡚗" (All brawl and no brains)
穢 wai3	Disgusting, revoltinge	噁心 ok3 sam1	
啦啦仔 laa4 laa1 zai2	Urban punk	MK仔 MK zai2	
水草 seoi2 cou2	Drinking straw	飲管 jam2 gun2	
跳飛機 tiu3 fei1 gei1	Illegal immigration	非法移民 fei1 faat3 ji4 man4	
書館 syu1 gun2/學堂 hok6 tong4	School	學校 hok6 haau6	
堂/唐 tong4	Classifier for vehicles, e.g. cars	架 gaa3	e.g. "2 Cars": 兩堂車 loeng5 tong4 ce1 (Malaysia), 兩架車 loeng5 gaa3 ce1 (Hong Kong)
落水 lok6 seoi2	Raining	落雨 lok6 jyu5	
Kuala Lumpur - 雪茶 syut3 caa4 Ipoh - 茶雪 caa4 syut3	Chinese Tea	中國茶 zung1 gwok3 caa4	

== See also ==
- Malaysian Chinese
- Cantonese people
- Cantonese
