= Bilingualism in Hong Kong =

Hong Kong is an official bilingual territory. Under article 9 of the Hong Kong Basic Law, and the Official Languages Ordinance, Both Chinese and English are equally official languages of the territory. However, no particular variety of "Chinese" referred to in laws is specified. While Mandarin written in simplified Chinese characters is used as the standard language in mainland China, Cantonese (Hong Kong Cantonese) in traditional Chinese characters is the de facto standard in Hong Kong.

== Chinese as an official language ==
In 1974, Chinese was declared as another official language of Hong Kong through the Official Languages Ordinance. The ordinance did not specify any particular variety of Chinese. The majority of Hong Kong residents have Cantonese, the language of Canton (now Guangzhou), as their mother tongue and this is considered the de facto official variety used by the government. Annex I of the 1984 Sino-British Joint Declaration provided that in addition to Chinese, English may be used for official purposes in the future Hong Kong special administrative region; in March 1987, the Official Languages Ordinance was amended to require all new legislation to be enacted bilingually in both English and Chinese. Article 9 of the Hong Kong Basic Law affirms the official status of both Chinese and English in Hong Kong.

Hong Kong's population reached 6.99 million in 2006, of which approximately 95% are of Chinese descent, the majority of which was Yue Chinese, such as Cantonese; and Hakka and Teochew.

Some writers and media of Hong Kong use written Cantonese as publishing. The Government of Hong Kong standardises those written Cantonese characters in Hong Kong Supplementary Character Set.

== English as an official language ==
Hong Kong became a crown colony of the United Kingdom in 1841, and was established as a free port to serve as an entrepôt of the British Empire. The government officials and businessmen from Britain spoke English. The British administration in Hong Kong continued to use English as an official language, but added Chinese as another official language in 1974 through the Official Languages Ordinance. Annex I of the 1984 Sino-British Joint Declaration provided that English may be used in addition to Chinese for official purposes in the future Hong Kong special administrative region, and this is affirmed under article 9 of the 1990 Hong Kong Basic Law.

Following the 1997 Handover of Hong Kong, English is still widely used in law and business, and it is still taught in kindergartens, primary schools, secondary schools, and universities. The British have also left their language on place names within Hong Kong, particularly on Hong Kong Island, where British rule had the largest impact.

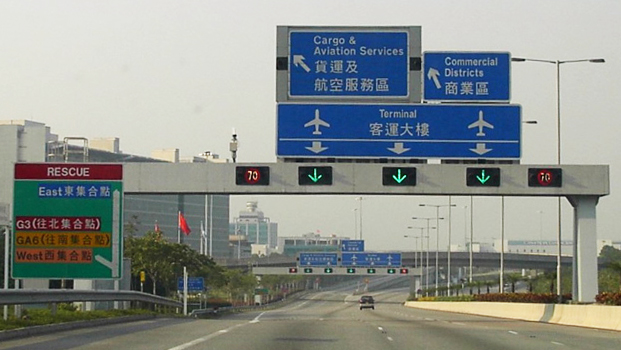
Bilingual freeway signs in Chek Lap Kok

== Code-switching in Hong Kong ==
Code-switching, or the practice of using more than one language in conversation, is very common in Hong Kong. It usually involves a mix of Cantonese and English as a result of the bilingualism in Hong Kong.

== Other languages in Hong Kong ==
Language proficiency in Hong Kong (1996, 2016)
Language	Year	percent
Cantonese	1996	95.2%	−0.6%
Cantonese	2016	94.6%	−0.6%
English	1996	38.1%	+15%
English	2016	53.1%	+15%
Mandarin	1996	25.3%	+23.3%
Mandarin	2016	48.6%	+23.3%

Hong Kong is home to a wide range of ethnicities, and substantial portions of Hongkongers are neither native English nor native Cantonese speakers. Japanese is the largest non-official language, with over 25,000 Japanese people in Hong Kong. Vietnamese refugees emigrated to Hong Kong following the Vietnam War starting 1975 and intensified following the Sino-Vietnamese War of 1979 and still speak Vietnamese as their first language.

Total proportion of population aged 5 and over being able to speak selected languages (2011, 2021)
Language	Year	percent
Cantonese	2011	97.4%	−1.4%
Cantonese	2021	96.0%	−1.4%
English	2011	45.2%	+12.5%
English	2021	57.7%	+12.5%
Mandarin	2011	49.5%	+6.9%
Mandarin	2021	56.4%	+6.9%

There is a significant number of South Asians in Hong Kong. Signboards written in Hindi or Urdu are common in areas with South Asians, and languages such as Nepali, Sindhi and Punjabi are often heard on the streets of Hong Kong as well.

In addition, the large number of domestic helpers from Indonesia and the Philippines make Indonesian and Tagalog significant minority languages in Hong Kong.

There are also two newspapers written in Nepali in Hong Kong, The Everest and the Sunrise Weekly Hong Kong. In 2004, the Home Affairs Bureau and Metro Plus AM 1044 jointly launched radio shows Hong Kong-Pak Tonight in Urdu and Harmo Sagarmatha in Nepali.

== See also ==
- Chinglish
- Chinese Pidgin English
- Hong Kong English
