= Hong Kong English =

English language as it is used in Hong Kong

- English
- Native to: Hong Kong
- Region: Asia
- Language family: Indo-European: Germanic; West Germanic; North Sea Germanic; Anglo-Frisian; Anglic; English; International English; British English; Hong Kong English
- Early forms: Proto-Indo-European: Proto-Germanic; Proto-West Germanic; Proto-English; Old English; Middle English; Early Modern English; Modern English
- Writing system: Latin (English alphabet); Unified English Braille

Official status
- Official language in: Hong Kong

Language codes
- ISO 639-3: –
- Glottolog: hong1245
- IETF: en-HK
- Location of Hong Kong

Hong Kong English or Honglish is a variant of the English language native to Hong Kong. The variant is either a learner interlanguage or emergent variant, primarily a result of Hong Kong's British colonial history and the influence of native Hong Kong Cantonese speakers.

== Background ==
Despite the Handover of Hong Kong in 1997, English has remained one of two official languages in the territory — the other being Cantonese — and is used in academia, business and the courts, as well as in most government materials. Major businesses routinely issue important material in both Chinese and English, and all road and government signs are bilingual.

However, English in Hong Kong has primarily remained a second language and is in decline, in contrast to its economic rival Singapore, where English has shifted toward being a first language and after being properly established and institutionalised for decades. The falling English proficiency of local English language teachers since the transition to Chinese control has come under criticism, and new generations of Hongkongers are increasingly not fluent in English.

That said, the proportion of the Hong Kong population who report using English (that is, all forms depending on fluency) as their "usual spoken language" increased from 2.8% in 2006 to 4.3% in 2016, while 51.1%, 63.5% and 65.6% respectively, reported being able to speak, write and read the language.

== Status ==
The existence of Hong Kong English as a distinct variety of the English language is still a matter of debate among many scholars.

=== Evidence suggesting an established variant ===
In literature examining the existence of Hong Kong English as a distinct variety, scholars have sought evidence of expression of the variant which may be classified according to the following criteria:

- Standard and recognisable accent; research has demonstrated the existence of, and a local preference for, a local Hong Kong English accent.
- Distinctive vocabulary; local media, such as newspapers, clearly show a shared common vocabulary used among English speakers in Hong Kong.
- History; a continuous link can be drawn between Hong Kong English and early pidgin forms used to communicate between traders in Canton before the establishment of Hong Kong as a colony.
- Literature using the variant; there is a growing corpus of literature produced in English which is meant for local consumption.
- Reference works; reference texts describing Hong Kong English are beginning to emerge, such as A Dictionary of Hong Kong English: Words from the Fragrant Harbor.

Using these criteria, scholars have said that Hong Kong English possess the attributes of a distinct variety. Hong Kong English is featured as a separate entity in the Oxford Guide to World English, under the sub-heading of "East Asia". Hong Kong English is also included as a separate variety of English within the International Corpus of English, with a dedicated local research team collecting data to describe the usage of English in Hong Kong.

=== Evidence suggesting the variant is not established ===
It has also been argued that Hong Kong English is not an established variant of English and the predominance of recent works discuss Hong Kong phonology in terms of erroneous deviation from varieties such as British and American English. In one co-authored work describing a study conducted of five Hong Kong speakers of English, it was concluded, controversially, as they conceded, that HKE was at most an emergent variety and perhaps no more than a "learner interlanguage". In the Dynamic Model of Postcolonial Englishes, it has been classified as in the third phase, that of Nativisation, but more recently it has been shown that many young people are happy to identify themselves as speakers of Hong Kong English, so it may be regarded as progressing into the fourth phase, that of Endonormative Stabilisation. Furthermore, by the criteria identified in the above section, scholars have noted that there is very little literature produced in English which is meant for local consumption.

=== Intelligibility and recognition ===
English spoken in Hong Kong has been shown to be largely intelligible to other English listeners, which helps explain why a growing number of people are comfortable identifying as speakers of this specific variety. However, language use remains highly politicised and compartmentalised within the territory, where the two official languages are often viewed as having distinct and separate functional roles.

Even among educators, there is a noted resistance toward acknowledging a localised "Hong Kong English" within a classroom setting, with many teachers opting instead for "standard" variations like American English or British English. This denial of a unique local variety is compounded by a historical lack of dedicated research compared to other established Asian varieties. As many Hongkongers deny the existence of a unique variety, Hong Kong English has struggled to achieve the same level of formal recognition or parity seen in other regional varieties of English.

== Pronunciation ==
As a result of the colonial legacy, the pronunciation of Hong Kong English was assumed to be originally based on British English. However, there are also new features of pronunciation derived from American English, and the influence of American English has emerged. Furthermore, there seem to be developments that are unique to Hong Kong English, such as a split in the realisation of /v/ as [f] or [w]. Some of the more salient features are listed below.

=== Segments and features ===
- /ð/ tends to be [d], so this is [dis]
- /ə/ tends to be [ɑ], so whether is [ˈwɛdɑ].
- /v/ may be [w] or [f], so event may have [w] while even has [f]. It seems that [w] occurs at the start of a stressed syllable while [f] occurs at the start of an unstressed syllable.
- There is alternation between [l] and [n], and the same speaker may alternate with words such as light and night, and both loud and number may have either [l] or [n] at the start.
- Words with final /s/ add long vowel /iː/; Joyce /dʒɔɪs/, for instance, becomes Joysee /ˈdʒɔɪsi:/. Rare or obsolete among younger speakers
- In final consonant clusters, just as with many other varieties of English, there is a tendency for simplification, so the plosive at the end of words such as think and camp is often omitted. Deletion of coronal plosives /t/ and /d/ from word-final clusters has been reported to occur in about 76% of tokens, though this frequency is a little less if the function words and and just are excluded from the analysis.
- L-vocalisation is common, so dark /l/ in the coda of a syllable is often pronounced as [ʊ], and fill may be [fiʊ] while tell is [tʰeʊ], just as in London English (Cockney). After back rounded vowels /l/ is often omitted, so school is [skuː] and wall is [wɔː].
- Like many accents in Britain, Australia, New Zealand and South Africa, Hong Kong English is non-rhotic, so /ɹ/ is only pronounced before a vowel. However, with the growing influence of American English, many young people in Hong Kong now pronounce the /ɹ/ in the coda of a syllable.
- There is often little distinction between the non-close front vowels, /æ/ and /ɛ/, so bat and bet may be pronounced the same (with [ɛ]).
- Long and short vowels are generally merged, particularly involving the close vowels /iː/ and /ɪ/ (so heat and hit are both pronounced [hit] with a short tense [i]) as well as /uː/ and /ʊ/ (so pull and pool are the same).
- Vowel reduction is often avoided in function words, so a full vowel occurs in words such as and and to as well as the first syllable of content words such as accept and patrol.
- There are no diphthong-consonant sequences in Cantonese. Hong Kong English is influenced by this phonotactic constraint: /eɪn/ becomes [e̝ŋ], /eɪm/ becomes [ɛm], /ɔɪn/ becomes [ɔn], /oʊn/ becomes [o̝ŋ], /aʊn/ becomes [aŋ], /eɪk/ becomes [e̝k̚], /oʊk/ becomes [o̝k̚], /eɪl/ becomes [ɛu̯] etc.
  - As for /aɪn/, /aɪt/, or /aɪk/, the coda consonant is generally omitted, yielding [aɪ].
- Voiced obstruents are often phonetically voiceless:
  - The voicing distinction in plosives and affricates is replaced with that of aspiration (e.g. /p b/ as [pʰ] [p])^{:130}
  - There is, similarly, often no difference in the phonetic quality of voiced and voiceless fricative pairs, yielding homophone pairs such as seal and zeal [siu].^{:130}
  - /v/ is realised as [f] in coda position, and [w] elsewhere.^{:131}
  - Note that Cantonese, similarly, lacks voiced obstruents.

=== Suprasegmentals ===
- Hong Kong English is marginally tonal, as some words are disambiguated purely based on a difference in tone. Examples include for /fɔː˨/ and four /fɔː˥/, as well as by /baɪ˨/ and buy /baɪ˥/. Hong Kong English borrows at least three contours (high, mid, and low) from Cantonese,^{:9-10} and may have as few as two phonemic tones; most syllables do not host tonemic information.
  - Gussenhoven (2012) proposes the following set of rules to derive the tone assignment of polysyllabic words and phrases:
    - Place H*L (high-low) on the primary stressed syllable and any preceding stresses.
    - Raise L to H if followed by H.
    - Place M (mid) on word-initial syllables without tone and function words.
    - Copy tones rightwards onto empty syllables.
  - It has been observed that the tone assignment of Hong Kong English closely resembles that of Guangzhou's Cantonese-accented English, suggesting that this system indicates that Hong Kong English is a Cantonese-accented second language as opposed to that of a nativised English variety.^{:8}
- Low tones are associated with creaky voice.^{:42–43}
- Multi-syllable words are often differently stressed. Examples include:
  - Latte /laˈteɪ/. Note that this variant pronunciation is unavailable in most compounds (e.g. matcha latte, caramel latte).
  - The suffix -ative /ˈeɪ.tɪv/ in word such as qualitative, reservative.
- Omission of entire "r-" syllables in longer words; difference becomes [ˈtifɐns], and temperature becomes [ˈtʰɛmpʰit͡sʰœ].
- Words beginning with the unstressed syllable con- are generally pronounced with its stressed form [kʰɔn] with a lower pitch, e.g. connection, consent, condition. Words beginning with the stressed syllable com- e.g. competition, common and compromise are pronounced [kʰǎm].
- The schwa tends to be pronounced as [ɛ] in final closed syllables; ticket is pronounced [ˈtʰe̝kʰɛt̚], and carpet is pronounced [ˈkʰapʰɛt̚].
- The suffix -age is generally pronounced [ei̯tʃ]; message is pronounced [ˈmɛsei̯tʃ], package is pronounced [ˈpʰɛkʰei̯tʃ] etc.
- There is less vowel reduction in unstressed syllables, and some variation in the placement of stress. For example, chocolate may be pronounced /ˈtʃɒkoʊleɪt/, as distinct from /ˈtʃɒklət/ in other varieties of English.
- Compared to other varieties of English, there is less difference between stressed and unstressed syllables. In most varieties of English, unstressed syllables are reduced, taking less time. This difference is smaller in Hong Kong English.

=== Others ===
- Confusion between homographs (words with the same spelling but different meanings), e.g. the noun resume (a CV) and the verb resume (to continue).

== American/British spelling and word usage ==
- Both British and American spellings are in common use, although the British variant predominates in official circles, and remains the officially taught form in education.
- Hong Kong has significant American influence in its treatment of abbreviations and initialisms: the full point is expected in shortened titles (Mr., Ms., Dr., St.), and government honours also retain the full point in post-nominals (G.B.M., G.B.S.), whereas British English no longer uses the full point (Mr, Ms, Dr, St).
- British vocabulary is more commonly used, for example: rubbish bin instead of garbage/trash can; lift instead of elevator; mobile phone instead of cell phone; estate agent instead of real estate broker.

== Hong Kong vocabulary/expressions ==
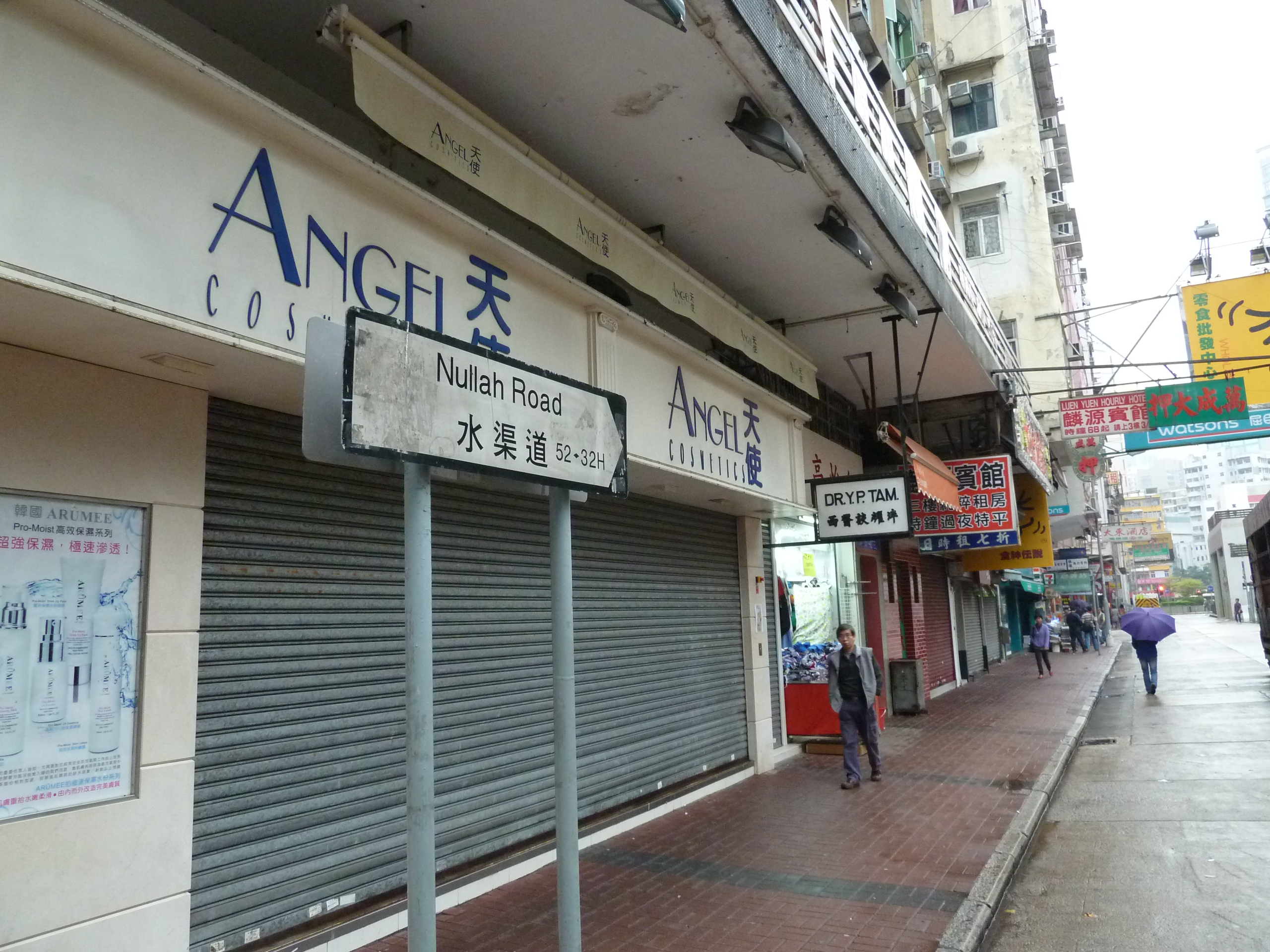
Nullah Road, Mong Kok

Some words and phrases widely understood and used in Hong Kong are rare or unheard of elsewhere. These often derive from Chinese, Anglo-Indian, or Portuguese/Macanese origins.

- A chop is a seal or stamp, e.g. a company chop is the seal or stamp of a corporation (it actually originates from colonial Indian English). It is now used in some other Commonwealth countries as a non-official term.
- A Tai-Pan (or taipan; Chinese: 大班; Sidney Lau: daai^{6} baan^{1}) is a term used in the early 20th century for a business executive of a large corporation.
- An amah (Chinese: 阿嬷; Sidney Lau: a^{3} ma^{4}) is a term used in the early 20th century for a live-in servant (from Macanese/Portuguese ama 'nurse'); now supplanted by [domestic] helper.
- A shroff is a cashier, in a hospital, a government office or a car park (parking garage).
- A godown is a warehouse. The term is thought to originate from the Malay word gudang. The ultimate origins were traced to the Indian subcontinent.
- A nullah is a concrete or stone-lined canal or a reinforced creek bed used to contain run-off. Nullah entered the English language from Hindi.
- Jetso ("著數") is sometimes used to mean discount or special offer.
- 'Add oil', direct translation of the Chinese 加油 (Sidney Lau: ga^{1} yau^{4}), an exclamatory entreaty of encouragement. The usage became popularised by the Umbrella Movement.
- Lai see, a transliteration of the Cantonese term (Chinese: 利是; Cantonese Yale: laih sih), also referred to as "red envelopes", or "red packets", or by the Mandarin term 紅包 (hóngbāo), for red envelopes bearing auspicious Chinese phrases or characters containing money and handed out as gifts, particularly during the Lunar New Year festival.

In 2015, University of Hong Kong professor Lisa Lim stated that some of the words, by that year, had declined in usage.

== See also ==
- Chinese Pidgin English
- Phonemic differentiation
- Regional accents of English
- Chinglish
- Singlish
- Macanese Portuguese
- Code-switching in Hong Kong
- Education in Hong Kong
- Hong Kong Cantonese
- Languages of Hong Kong
- Hong Kong English pop
- Commonwealth English
