= Code-switching in Hong Kong =

Switching between Cantonese and English in Hong Kong

Code-switching is a type of linguistic behaviour that juxtaposes "passages of speech belonging to two different grammatical systems or sub-systems, within the same exchange". Code-switching in Hong Kong mainly concerns two grammatical systems: Cantonese and English. According to Matrix Language Frame Model, Cantonese, as the "matrix language", contributes bound morphemes, content and function words, whereas, English, the "embedded language", contributes lexical, phrases or compound words.

Distinctions still exist, albeit subtle, among "Hong Kong English", "borrowing", "code-mixing" and "code-switching". The definition of Hong Kong English is controversial, as to whether it is a type of learner language or a new variety of English. Nevertheless, it belongs to the domain of English. "Borrowing" or "loanwords" refers to words taken from another languages after the process of phonological and morphological assimilation. Borrowed items are supposed to be so deeply entrenched into the base language that speakers are not always conscious of their foreign origin. "Code-mixing" and "code-switching", on the other hand, incur less integration into the base language and speakers sometimes are aware of the coexistence of two systems. Various units can be involved in the process, from single words to longer elements such as phrases and clauses. Early works on this phenomenon in Hong Kong reserve "code-mixing" for intra-sentential alternation between Cantonese and English and "code-switching" for the inter-sentential alternation. Nevertheless, "code-mixing" has been gradually stigmatised, implying the incompetence of the bilingual speakers in either or both languages. As a result, "code-switching" tends to be employed as the umbrella term for both alternations, although the intra-sentential mode is predominant among Cantonese-speaking Hong Kong Chinese.

Code-switching, deemed less formal than pure English or Cantonese, appears mostly in interaction between peers. Still, this phenomenon occurs in written media, including local magazines, popular entertainment books, columns in newspapers and advertisements, especially on technology or business administration related topics.

== Social background ==
- The history of British colonisation and the tradition of bilingualism since then exert significant influence on linguistic situations in Hong Kong. (See Bilingualism in Hong Kong for more)
- For individual Hong Kongers, even after the handover to the People's Republic of China in 1997, the status of English remains both a cultural and symbolic capital. The fact that they code-switch, continue to use traditional Chinese characters (along with Taiwan, Macau, and the Chinese diaspora), and accord high "prestige value" to English, signals the gesture of maintaining a separate identity from mainland China.

== Linguistic features of code-switching in Hong Kong ==
=== Phonetics/phonology ===
Different segments of English words undergo phonological changes when mixed into Cantonese, affecting vowels, single initial and final consonants, initial and final consonant clusters. Stress of original codes is also subject to shift in some cases.

=== Syntax ===
The English elements engaged in the code-switching process are mostly of one or two words in length, and are usually content words that can fit into the surrounding Cantonese phrase fairly easily, like nouns, verbs, adjectives, and occasionally, adverbs. Examples include:

- 去canteen食飯; heoi3 ken6-tin1 sik6 faan6 ('go to the canteen for lunch')
- 好多嘢press你; hou2 do1 je5 pet1 si4 nei5 ('A lot of things press you')
- 我唔sure; ngo5 m4 su1-aa4 ('I'm not sure')
- 幫我check一check啊; bong1 ngo5 cek1 jat1 cek1 aa1 ('Help me search/check for it')

Meanwhile, structure words like determiners, conjunctions and auxiliary verbs almost never appear alone in the predominantly Cantonese discourse, which explains the ungrammaticality of two節 (does not make sense, but literally means 'two parts'). English lexical items, on the other hand, are frequently assimilated into Cantonese grammar. For instance,

- 兩part; loeng5 paat1 ('two parts'), "part" would lose its plural morpheme "s" as do its counterpart in Cantonese.
- equip 咗; ji6 kwip1 zo2 ('equipped'), "equip" is followed by a Cantonese perfective aspect marker. A more evident case of the syntactic assimilation would be where a negation marker is inserted into an English compound adjective or verb to form yes–no questions in Cantonese.
- 佢可唔可愛呀？; keoi5 ho2 m4 ho2 oi3 aa3 ('Is she/he lovely?') is pure Cantonese while a sentence like 佢cu唔cute啊？; keoi5 kiu1 m4 cute aa3 ('Is he/she cute?') is a typical example of the assimilation.

For English elements consisting of two words or more, they generally retain English grammar internally without disrupting the surrounding Cantonese grammar. For example,

- 唔使再搵part-time job啦; m5 sai2 zoi3 wan2 paat1 taam1 zop1 laa3 ('You don't need to look for a part-time job again')

(Examples are taken from the same source).

== Motivations ==
The first major framework dichotomises motivations of code-switching in Hong Kong into "expedient mixing" and "orientational mixing". For expedient mixing, the speaker would turn to English (e.g., form) if the correspondent "low Cantonese" expression is not available and the existing "high Cantonese" expression (e.g., 表格; biu2 gaak3) sounds too formal. In the case of orientational mixing, despite the presence of both "high" and "low" expression (e.g., for "barbecue", there exists both 燒烤; siu1 haau1 in "high Cantonese" and 燒嘢食; siu1 je5 sik6 in "low Cantonese"), the speaker could still resort to English if the subject is perceived to be inherently more 'Western'. The following list elaborates and summaries the distinction between English, "High Cantonese", "Low Cantonese" and Code-Switching.

Taxonomy identifies four specific motivations, including euphemism, the principle of economy, specificity and bilingual punning. (The following examples come from the same source.)

=== Euphemism ===
The English counterpart is preferred if the speaker finds the explicit Cantonese expression culturally embarrassing, like breasts of females or open expression of personal feelings. Therefore, in the example of 透bra格格; tau3 baa1 gaak3 gaak3 ('a princess whose bra is visible'), "bra" replaces its Cantonese counterparts.

=== Principle of economy ===
English is also preferred if it would require less linguistic effort in comparison with its Cantonese equivalent. Instead of code-switching and using "check-in" in expressions like 你check咗in未; nei5 cek1 zo2 in6 mei6 ('Have you checked in yet?'), people will have to use the pure Cantonese expression 辦理登機手續; baan6 lei5 dang1 gei1 sau2 zuk6, which contains six syllables.

=== Specificity ===
Proper names and technical terms are likely to appear in its original language, like "lock brake", "kick down", and "power shift" in auto magazines. English is either used to fill the lexical gap where generally accepted Chinese translation is unavailable, or to avoid confusion if one single English term has different versions of translation in Mainland China, Taiwan and Hong Kong.

=== Bilingual punning ===
Bilingual punning makes the use of similarity in pronunciation between English and Cantonese to attract attention, especially for advertisements. In particular, 'fun' is frequently used as it forms almost complete homophonous with the Cantonese characters like 分; fan1 ('point' or 'to share') and 紛; fan1 ('many and various'). Examples include the slang phrase "high tech 揩嘢，low tech 撈嘢; haai1 tek1 haai1 je5, lou1 tek1 lou1 je5 ('High Tech brings trouble while Low Tech is profitable')" and the promotion slogan "英文多fun日; jing1 man4*2 do1 fan1 jat6 ('A day having great fun/high mark with English')".

In the extended version this taxonomy, "quotation in the original code", "doubling of the same expression in two codes for emphasis" and "English interjections inserted into Cantonese" are also included.

== See also ==
- Bilingualism in Hong Kong
- Chinglish
- Code-switching
- Hong Kong English
