= Linguistic Society of Hong Kong =

Non-profit academic association

- 香港語言學學會
- Abbreviation: LSHK
- Formation: 8 March 1986
- Type: Academic association
- Location: Hong Kong
- President: Lau, Chaak-ming
- Vice-President: Lai, Yik Po
- Secretary: Felix Sze
- Treasurer: Winnie Chor
- Website: www.lshk.org

Linguistic Society of Hong Kong
- Traditional Chinese: 香港語言學學會
- Simplified Chinese: 香港语言学学会
- Jyutping: hoeng1 gong2 jyu5 jin4 hok6 hok6 wui2
Transcriptions
Standard Mandarin
- Hanyu Pinyin: Xiānggǎng Yǔyánxué Xuéhuì
- Bopomofo: ㄒㄧㄤ ㄍㄤˇ ㄩˇ ㄧㄢˊ ㄒㄩㄝˊ ㄒㄩㄝˊ ㄏㄨㄟˋ
- Wade–Giles: Hsiang^{1}-kang^{3} Yü^{3}-yan^{2}-hsüeh^{2} Hsüeh^{2}-hui^{4}
- Tongyong Pinyin: Sianggǎng Yǔ-yán-syué Syué-huèi
- IPA: [ɕjáŋ.kàŋ ỳ.jɛ̌n.ɕɥě ɕɥě xwêɪ]
Yue: Cantonese
- Yale Romanization: Hēung góng yúh yìhn hohk hohk wuih
- Jyutping: hoeng1 gong2 jyu5 jin4 hok6 hok6 wui2
- IPA: [hœŋ˥ kɔŋ˧˥ jy˩˧ jin˩ hɔk̚˨ hɔk̚˨ wuj˧˥]

The Linguistic Society of Hong Kong (LSHK) is a non-profit academic association, which was formally registered as a charitable organization in Hong Kong on 8 March 1986.

They are the creators of "The Linguistic Society of Hong Kong Cantonese Romanization Scheme" known as Jyutping.

== See also ==
- Hong Kong Cantonese
