= Hong Kong written Chinese =

Variety of Chinese found in Hong Kong and Macau

- Chinese: 港式中文
- Jyutping: gong2 sik1 zung1 man4
Transcriptions
Standard Mandarin
- Hanyu Pinyin: Gǎngshì Zhōngwén
Yue: Cantonese
- Jyutping: gong2 sik1 zung1 man4

Written language
- Traditional Chinese: 書面語
- Simplified Chinese: 书面语
- Jyutping: syu1 min2 jyu5
Transcriptions
Standard Mandarin
- Hanyu Pinyin: Shūmiànyǔ
Yue: Cantonese
- Jyutping: syu1 min2 jyu5

Hong Kong written Chinese (HKWC) is a local variety of written vernacular Chinese (Mandarin) used in formal written communication in Hong Kong and Macau. The common name for this form of Chinese is "written language" (書面語), in contrast to the "spoken language" (口語), i.e. Cantonese. While, like other varieties of Written Chinese, it is a variety of Mandarin, excluding its higher register, it differs from the variety of Standard Chinese used and promoted in mainland China in several aspects, including that it is usually written in traditional characters, that it is often read aloud in Cantonese and not Standard Mandarin, and that its lexicon has English and Cantonese influences. Thus it must not be confused with written Cantonese which, even in Hong Kong, enjoys much less prestige as a literary language than written vernacular Mandarin Chinese. The language situation in Hong Kong still reflects the pre-20th century situation of Chinese diglossia where the spoken and literary language differed and the latter was read aloud in the phonology of the respective regional variety instead of a national one.

== History ==
With the formal standardisation of the Mandarin Chinese language in the Republic of China, teaching materials began being exported to the British crown colonies Hong Kong, Singapore and Malaya. The Chinese Communist Party's victory over the Chinese Nationalist Party in the Chinese Civil War, the retreat of the government of the Republic of China to Taiwan and the subsequent diplomatic isolation of the People's Republic of China from Britain under the One-China policy propagandised by the government of the Republic of China led to a diversification of the Standard Chinese (Mandarin) language. There are four primary standardised forms of Mandarin today: that of mainland China, Taiwan, Singapore and Malaysia. Hong Kong, on the other hand, was a British colony until 1997 and for most of the British colonial era, English had been the only official language. Chinese was recognised as a co-official language in 1974 after recurring riots as well as scholarly activism. Although legal texts were translated from English into Chinese in the late 1970s, the English versions alone continued to be the ultimately valid ones. This meant that there was not much historical effort on the British side to standardise a written standard of Chinese in Hong Kong. This lack of political intervention facilitated the formation what was coined Hong Kong written Chinese (港式中文 by Shi, 2006) by linguist Shao Jingmin in 1996 in order to distinguish it from Putonghua.

=== Development of registers ===
Hong Kong written Chinese, if taken to mean all forms of Chinese writing employed in Hong Kong, has different registers depending on the context in which it is used. It is a continuum between written Standard Mandarin Chinese, the acrolect and written vernacular Cantonese, the basilect. The higher registers used in government, schools and formal settings is identical or nearly identical to written Standard Mandarin Chinese. Yet lower registers, used in more informal settings, also developed through code-switching with written vernacular Cantonese. The rising popularity and prestige of the Cantonese language with the boom of the Hong Kong entertainment industry, especially cinema and music, in the 1980s was a contributing factor in the popularisation of written Cantonese. It began to be used more and more in subtitles, magazines, comic books and popular fiction. In more formal settings, written vernacular Cantonese can also appear in court protocols and police reports when exact transcription is deemed as important.

=== After the Handover ===
Chinese, without specification of any variety, stayed a fully recognised official language of Hong Kong, in addition to English, with the handover to the People's Republic of China in 1997. Since then, the high register of Hong Kong written Chinese has been used by the Hong Kong government on a regional level, while spoken Standard Mandarin (Putonghua; 普通話) is used in communications with the central Chinese government and mainland Chinese. In 1996, the government of Hong Kong announced the 'biliterate and trilingual' education policy, aiming to prepare the people of Hong Kong for the handover on a linguistic level. The policy aimed to promote trilingual proficiency in English, Standard Mandarin and Cantonese among the Hong Kong people. After the handover, first Chief Executive Tung Chee-hwa affirmed the new regime's commitment to the policy. In recent years, the Chinese government and the Hong Kong government have ramped up their promotion of spoken Standard Mandarin in Hong Kong in line with the growing economic dependence on mainland China, migration of mainland Chinese into Hong Kong and cultural and political assimilation of Hong Kong into China, factors which have increased the need for locals to learn spoken Standard Mandarin, the national common language (國家通用語言) of the People's Republic of China, too. These and other political issues have led to tensions between the pro-Beijing camp, which are in favour of assimilating with China, and localist camp, which are in favour of protecting the widespread use of Hong Kong Cantonese in Hong Kong. Some localist xenophobes have also conducted discriminatory acts under the presumption that all mainland Chinese are part of the pro-Beijing camp.

== Phonology ==
Although Hong Kong written Chinese is a variety of Mandarin Chinese, it is usually read aloud in Cantonese. However, the colloquial and literary Cantonese readings of Chinese characters can sometimes differ. The latter are based on traditional rime dictionaries and employed when reading out loud texts in Classical or written vernacular Mandarin Chinese. Thus, students in Hong Kong schools get corrected by their teachers if they read aloud a character in a written vernacular Mandarin Chinese text using the colloquial pronunciation. Some regular differences between colloquial and literary readings in Cantonese include:

1. The Late Middle Chinese (LMC) initial */fɦ-/ corresponds to colloquial /p-/ and /pʰ-/, but to literary /f-/, e.g. 婦 LMC */fɦuə̌/, coll. /pʰou˩˧/ and lit. /fu˩˧/, '(married) woman'.
2. The LMC syllables /ŋiC_{nasal}/ and /ŋi̯eC_{nasal}/ correspond to colloquial /ŋɐC_{nasal}/ and /ŋa:C_{nasal}/ respectively, but to literary /jɐC_{nasal}/ and /jiC_{nasal}/, e.g. 吟 LMC /ŋīm/, coll. /ŋɐm˨˩/ and lit. /jɐm˨˩/ 'to recite; to groan'; 研 LMC /ŋi̯ên/, coll. /ŋaːn˨˩/ and lit. /jin˨˩/ 'research'.
3. The colloquial rimes /-ɛːC/ and /-ɛːu̯/ correspond to literary rimes /-ɪC/ and /-iːu̯/ respectively, e.g. 名 coll. /mɛːŋ˨˩/ versus lit. /mɪŋ˨˩/, 'name'.
4. The colloquial rime /-ɐɪ̯/ corresponds to literary /-ɔɪ̯/ when going back to LMC */-ʌi/, whereas it corresponds to literary /-iː/ when going back to LMC */-i/.
5. The colloquial rime /-œː/ corresponds to literary /-ɔː/.
6. LMC syllables with voiced/breathy obstruent initials and rising-tone rimes correspond to colloquial readings with aspirate initials and low-rising-tone rimes, but to literary readings with tenuis initials and low-even-tone rimes, e.g. 棒 LMC /pɦə̌ŋ/, coll. /pʰaːŋ˩˧/ and lit. /paːŋ˨/. Here the colloquial variant preserves the phonetic realisation of the LMC tone more authentically. The literary reading imitates the correspondence of LMC syllables with voiced obstruent initials and rising-tone rimes with Mandarin syllables with falling-tone rimes (the Cantonese mid- and lower-even tone rimes correspond to Mandarin falling-tone rimes).

== Lexicon ==
=== Lexical differences between the different varieties of written Chinese ===
Some lexical differences between the varieties of formal written Standard Chinese in mainland China, Hong Kong and Taiwan:

Mainland China	Hong Kong	Taiwan	English
出租汽车 chūzū qìchē (Note: lit. rental car, meaning exactly that in Taiwanese Mandarin.)	的士 dik^{1} si^{6-2} (Note: loan from eng. taxi, as Singaporean and Malaysian Mandarin 德士 déshì.)	計程車 jìchéngchē (Note: lit. calculate-mileage-car.)	"taxi"
移动电话 yídòng diànhuà	流動電話 lau^{4} dung^{6} din^{6} waa^{6-2}	行動電話 xíngdòng diànhuà (Note: All three forms ultimately calqued from eng. mobile phone.)	"mobile phone"
服务器 fúwùqì	伺服器 si^{6} fuk^{6} hei^{6}	伺服器 sìfúqì (Note: All three forms lit. mean serving tool.)	"server"
初一 chūyī	中一 zung^{1} jat^{1} (Note: lit. middle one, also in Singaporean and Malaysian Mandarin.)	初一 chūyī / 國一 guóyī	"7th grade"

It is worth noting that some mainland Chinese and Taiwanese terms are occasionally used in Hong Kong and Macau when writing in the highest register.

=== Semantic differences between the varieties of written Chinese ===
Some lexemes appear both in Hong Kong written Chinese and Standard Mandarin Chinese, but may differ in their semantic range and value when the former is used outside of its highest register:

Word	Meaning in Standard Mandarin Chinese	Meaning in Hong Kong written Chinese
认真 rènzhēn / 認真 jing^{6} zan^{1}	seriously, earnestly	truly, really
机会 jīhuì / 機會 gei¹ wui⁶	opportunity (for gaining advantages or benefits)	opportunity (for anything)
懂 dǒng / 懂 dung²	to understand	to understand; to know (Note: Also in Singaporean and Malaysian Mandarin.)

== Grammar ==
The grammar of HKWC when used outside of its highest register is slightly different from that of Standard Mandarin:

- Conjunction words that are paired in Standard Mandarin can be used alone in HKWC. For example, the latter parts of 即使…也… ("even if") and 單…就… are commonly omitted in HKWC. Shi & Wang (2006) argues this is due to influence from English.
- Conjunction words are used in pairings not seen in Standard Mandarin.
- Null anaphoric forms can refer to the object of a preposition.
- Null anaphoric forms have longer-ranged antecedents compared to Standard Mandarin; there is no requirement for a strict, linear order.
- Null anaphoric forms can refer to an antecedent in a different level.
- The resumptive pronoun 這 ("this") is commonly elided, compared to Standard Mandarin.
- The Standard Mandarin demonstrative 這 is not commonly used. Instead, three demonstratives, 該、是、今, function for specific types of nouns.
- The use of 該 is expanded compared to that of Standard Mandarin, being no longer limited to singular nouns with no morphemes between the demonstrative and the noun.
- The demonstrative is commonly elided.
- The indefinite 有 functions more like 一個/一些 in Standard Mandarin.
- Several sentence structures borrowed from English exist.

== Comparison with written Cantonese ==
The highers registers of Hong Kong written Chinese generally differ almost as much from written Cantonese as formal spoken Standard Mandarin Chinese does. Some examples:

Standard Mandarin	HKWC	Written Cantonese	English
他 tā	他 ta^{1}	佢 keoi^{5}	"he/she/it"
我们 / 我們 wǒmen	我們 ngo^{5} mun^{4}	我哋 ngo^{5} dei^{6}	"we"
我的 wǒde	我的 ngo^{5} dik^{1}	我嘅 ngo^{5} ge^{3}	"my"
什么 / 甚麼 shénme	甚麼 sam^{6} mo^{1}	乜 mat^{1}	"what?"
哪里 / 哪裏 nǎlǐ	哪裏 naa^{5} leoi^{5}	邊度 bin^{1} dou^{6}	"where?"
没有 / 沒有 méiyǒu	沒有 mut^{6} jau^{5}	冇 mou^{5}	"to not exist; to not have"
