= Official Languages Ordinance =

Legislation of Hong Kong

Legislative Council of Hong Kong
- Long title: An Ordinance to provide for the official languages of Hong Kong, and for their status and use.
- Citation: Cap. 5
- Enacted by: Legislative Council of Hong Kong
- Commenced: 15 February 1974

Legislative history
- Introduced by: Secretary for Home Affairs Denis Campbell Bray
- Introduced: 11 January 1974
- First reading: 30 January 1974
- Second reading: 13 February 1974
- Third reading: 13 February 1974

Amended by
- 1975, 1980, 1987, 1988, 1989, 1992, 1994, 1995, 1997, 1998, 1999, 2011, 2017
- Status: Current legislation

The Official Languages Ordinance is an ordinance of Hong Kong enacted for the purpose of specifying the status and use of official languages of the territory. Both Chinese and English are declared official languages with equal status in the ordinance, and are to be used in communication between the government and members of the public. It dictates that all ordinances would be enacted and published in both languages, and allows judicial officers the choice of using either language in court proceedings.

== History ==
While no law existed prior to 1974 to designate official languages in Hong Kong, English was the sole language used in all branches of the British colonial government. Under public pressure, the Official Languages Ordinance was enacted in 1974 to declare that both English and Chinese may be used in communication between the government and the public. Despite the usage of different varieties of Chinese when speaking, the government chose not to specify any variety, instead choosing to use the term "Chinese" in order to allow ambiguity as to what variety or varieties of Chinese are to be accepted. Since most of the local population spoke Cantonese, it became the most frequently used variety to represent "Chinese" in official oral communication. In writing, however, "Chinese" nearly always refers to Written Vernacular Chinese.

Following the introduction of the ordinance, its application was uneven. Ordinances continued to be published in English only until the 1980s and Chinese could not be used procedurally in the courts until an amendment was made in 1995. In 2020, there was a marked departure from the ordinance when the Hong Kong National Security Law was passed. It was officially published in the Hong Kong Government Gazette solely in Chinese, with the Xinhua News Agency later confirming that the Chinese version of the National Security Law would prevail over the unofficial English translation of it in interpretation.
