= Hong Kong Cantonese =

Dialect of Cantonese spoken in Hong Kong

- 香港粵語 香港廣東話
- Native to: Hong Kong and some Overseas Communities
- Region: Pearl River Delta
- Ethnicity: Hongkongers
- Language family: Sino-Tibetan: Sinitic; Chinese; Yue; Yuehai; Cantonese; Hong Kong Cantonese
- Writing system: Traditional Chinese

Language codes
- ISO 639-3: –
- ISO 639-6: xgng
- Glottolog: xian1255
- Linguasphere: 79-AAA-mac
- IETF: yue-HK

Hong Kong Cantonese
- Traditional Chinese: 香港粵語
- Simplified Chinese: 香港粤语
Transcriptions
Standard Mandarin
- Hanyu Pinyin: Xiānggǎng yuèyǔ
- Bopomofo: ㄒㄧㄤ ㄍㄤˇ ㄩㄝˋ ㄩˇ
- Wade–Giles: Hsiang^{1}-kang^{3} Yüeh^{4}-yü^{3}
- Tongyong Pinyin: Sianggǎng yuè-yǔ
- IPA: [ɕjáŋ.kàŋ ɥê ỳ]
Yue: Cantonese
- Yale Romanization: Hēung góng yuht yúh
- Jyutping: hoeng1 gong2 jyut6 jyu5
- IPA: [hœŋ˥ kɔŋ˧˥ jyt̚˨ jy˩˧]

Hong Kong-style Cantonese
- Traditional Chinese: 港式廣東話
Transcriptions
Yue: Cantonese
- Yale Romanization: Góng sīk gwóng dūng wá
- Jyutping: gong2 sik1 gwong2 dung1 waa2
- IPA: [kɔŋ˧˥ sɪk̚˥ kʷɔŋ˧˥ tʊŋ˥ wa˧˥]

Third alternative Chinese name
- Traditional Chinese: 香港廣東話
Transcriptions
Yue: Cantonese
- Yale Romanization: Hēung góng gwóng dūng wá
- Jyutping: hoeng1 gong2 gwong2 dung1 waa2
- IPA: [hœŋ˥ kɔŋ˧˥ kʷɔŋ˧˥ tʊŋ˥ wa˧˥]

Hongkongese dialect of Cantonese
- Traditional Chinese: 香港廣州話
Transcriptions
Yue: Cantonese
- Yale Romanization: Hēung góng gwóng jāu wá
- Jyutping: hoeng1 gong2 gwong2 zau1 waa2
- IPA: [hœŋ˥ kɔŋ˧˥ kʷɔŋ˧˥ tsɐw˥ wa˧˥]

Hong Kong dialect
- Traditional Chinese: 香港話
Transcriptions
Yue: Cantonese
- Yale Romanization: Hēung góng wá
- Jyutping: hoeng1 gong2 waa2
- IPA: [hœŋ˥ kɔŋ˧˥ wa˧˥]

Hong Kong Cantonese is a dialect of Cantonese spoken primarily in Hong Kong. As the most commonly spoken language in Hong Kong, it shares a recent and direct lineage with the Guangzhou (Canton) dialect of Cantonese.

Due to the colonial heritage of Hong Kong, Hong Kong Cantonese exhibits distinct differences in vocabulary and certain speech patterns. Over the years, Hong Kong Cantonese has also absorbed foreign terminology and developed a large set of Hong Kong-specific terms. Code-switching with English is also common.

As of 2021, 88.2% of Hong Kong's population identified Cantonese as their "usual spoken language," while 93.7% reported being able to speak it.

The specific IETF code for Cantonese written with traditional Han characters as used in Hong Kong is yue-Hant-HK.

== Name ==
Hong Kong Cantonese is predominantly referred to as "Cantonese" in English and gwong2 dung1 waa2 (廣東話, lit. Guangdong speech) by its native speakers, while the government also officially refers to it as gwong2 zau1 waa2 (廣州話, lit. Guangzhou speech).

== History ==
Before the arrival of British settlers in 1842, the inhabitants of Hong Kong mainly spoke the Dongguan-Bao'an (Tungkun–Po'on) and Tanka dialects of Yue, as well as Hakka and Hokkien. These languages and dialects are all remarkably different from Guangzhou Cantonese, and not mutually intelligible.

After the British acquired Hong Kong Island, Kowloon Peninsula and the New Territories from the Qing in 1841 (officially 1842) and 1898, many tens of thousands of merchants and workers came to Hong Kong from the city of Canton, the main centre of Cantonese, especially in the wake of the outbreak of the Taiping Rebellion in Canton in 1850 and then the Second Opium War (1856-1860). Thus, Cantonese became the dominant spoken language in Hong Kong. The extensive migration from mainland Cantonese-speaking areas to Hong Kong continued up until 1949, when the Communists took over mainland China.

In 1949, the year that the People's Republic of China was established, Hong Kong saw a large influx of refugees from mainland China, prompting the Hong Kong Government to restrict entry of immigrants at the border under the Immigrants Control Ordinance 1949. Illegal immigration from mainland China into Hong Kong nevertheless continued. During the 1950s, the Cantonese spoken in Hong Kong remained very similar to that in Canton, but the proportion of Cantonese speakers did not surpass 50% of the population in Hong Kong.

Movement, communication and relations between Hong Kong and mainland China became very limited, and consequently the evolution of Cantonese in Hong Kong diverged from that of Guangzhou. In mainland China, the use of Mandarin as the official language and in education was enforced. In Hong Kong, Cantonese was the medium of instruction in schools, along with written English and written Chinese. As such, since the 1970s the percentage of Cantonese speakers in Hong Kong has risen to about 90%.

Because of the long exposure to English during the colonial period, a large number of English words were loaned into Hong Kong Cantonese, e.g. "巴士" (IPA: /páːsǐː/, Cantonese Jyutping: baa^{1} si^{2}), from the English "bus"; compare this with the equivalent from Standard Mandarin, 公共汽車 (Jyutping: gung1 gung6 hei3 ce1; pinyin: gōnggòng qìchē). Consequently, the vocabularies of Cantonese in mainland China and Hong Kong substantially differ. Moreover, the pronunciation of Cantonese noticeably changed while the change either did not occur in mainland China or took place much more slowly. For example, merging of initial /n/ into /l/ and the deletion of /ŋ/ were observed.

== Phonology ==
In modern-day Hong Kong, many native speakers no longer distinguish between certain phoneme pairs, leading to instances of sound change through mergers. Although considered non-standard and denounced as "lazy sound" (懶音) by purists, the phenomena are widespread and not restricted to Hong Kong. Contrary to impressions, some of these changes are not recent. The loss of the velar nasal (/ŋ/) was documented by Williams (1856), and the substitution of the liquid nasal (/l/) for the nasal initial (/n/) was documented by Cowles (1914).

List of observed shifts:

- Merging of /n/ initial into /l/ initial.
- Merging of /ŋ/ initial into null initial.
- Merging of /kʷ/ and /kʷʰ/ initials into /k/ and /kʰ/ when followed by /ɔː/. Note that /ʷ/ is the only glide (介音) in Cantonese.
- Merging of /ŋ/ and /k/ codas into /n/ and /t/ codas respectively, eliminating contrast between these pairs of finals (except after /e/ and /o/): /aːn/-/aːŋ/, /aːt/-/aːk/, /ɐn/-/ɐŋ/, /ɐt/-/ɐk/, /ɔːn/-/ɔːŋ/ and /ɔːt/-/ɔːk/.
- Merging of the two syllabic nasals, /ŋ̍/ into /m̩/, eliminating the contrast of sounds between 吳 (surname Ng) and 唔 (not).
- Merging of the rising tones (陰上 2nd and 陽上 5th).

In educated Hong Kong Cantonese speech, these sound mergers are avoided, and many older speakers still distinguish between those phoneme categories. With the sound changes, the name of Hong Kong's Hang Seng Bank (香港恆生銀行), Jyutping: Hoeng^{1} gong^{2} hang^{4} sang^{1} ngan^{4} hong^{4}, /hœ́ːŋ kɔ̌ːŋ hɐ̏ŋ sɐ́ŋ ŋɐ̏n hɔ̏ːŋ/, literally Hong Kong Constant Growth Bank, becomes /hœ́ːn kɔ̌ːn hɐ̏n sɐ́n ɐ̏n hɔ̏ːn/, sounding like Hon' Kon' itchy body 'un cold ('香港'痕身un寒). The name of Cantonese itself (廣東話, "Guangdong speech") would be Jyutping: Gwong^{2} dung^{1} waa^{2}, IPA: /kʷɔ̌ːŋ tʊ́ŋ wǎː/ without the merger, whereas /kɔ̌ːŋ tʊ́ŋ wǎː/ (sounding like "講東話": "say eastern speech") and /kɔ̌ːn tʊ́ŋ wǎː/ (sounding like "趕東話" : "chase away eastern speech") are overwhelmingly common in Hong Kong.

The shift affects the way some Hong Kong people speak other languages as well. This is especially evident in the pronunciation of certain English names: "Nicole" pronounce [lekˈkou̯], "Nancy" pronounce [ˈlɛnsi] etc. A very common example of the mixing of /n/ and /l/ is that of the word 你, meaning "you". Even though the standard pronunciation should be /nei/, the word is often pronounced /lei/, which is the surname 李, or the word 理, meaning theory. The merger of /n/ and /l/ also affects the choice of characters when the Cantonese media transliterates foreign names.

Prescriptivists who try to correct these "lazy sounds" often end up introducing hypercorrections. For instance, while attempting to ensure that people pronounce the initial /ŋ/, they may introduce it into words which have historically had a null-initial. One common example is that of the word 愛, meaning "love", where even though the standard pronunciation is Jyutping: oi^{3}, IPA: /ɔ̄ːi/, the word is often pronounced Jyutping: ngoi^{3}, /ŋɔ̄ːi/. A similar phenomenon occurs in various Mandarin dialects (e.g. Southwestern Mandarin).

== Unique phrases and expressions ==
Hong Kong Cantonese has developed a number of phrases and expressions that are unique to the context of Hong Kong. Examples are:

Table of Colloquial Cantonese Expressions
Colloquial Cantonese Expressions(pronunciation)	Literally	Colloquially	Explanation
串 (cyun3) Example: 你洗唔洗咁串呀! English: Do you have to be so harsh?	skewer/to string/vulgar	harsh/extreme bluntness, lack of tact	colloquial usage for police handcuffing, broadened to incorporate harsh expression generally; alternatively, by modification of the tone value for "vulgar"

== Loanwords ==
Life in Hong Kong is characterised by the blending of southern Chinese with other Asian and Western cultures, as well as the city's position as a major international business centre. In turn, Hong Kong influences have spread widely into other cultures. As a result, a large number of loanwords are created in Hong Kong and then exported to mainland China, Taiwan, Singapore, and Japan. Some of the loanwords have become even more popular than their Chinese counterparts, in Hong Kong as well as in their destination cultures. Note that some of the loanwords are being used much more frequently in Cantonese-speaking areas in mainland China (e.g. Guangzhou), than in areas speaking other Chinese varieties.

=== Imported loanwords ===
Selected loanwords are shown below.

==== From English ====
Hong Kong Cantonese	Jyutping	English	Mainland Mandarin (Putonghua)	Taiwanese Mandarin (Guoyu)
戶口	wu^{6} hau^{2}	account	帐号	帳戶
拗撬	aau^{3} giu^{6}	argue arguments (fights)	吵架	吵架
百家樂	baak^{3} gaa^{1} lok^{6}	Baccarat (card game)	百家乐	百家樂
波	bo^{1}	ball	球	球
(跳)芭蕾(舞)	baa^{1} leoi^{4}	ballet	(跳)芭蕾(舞)	(跳)芭蕾(舞)
繃帶	bang^{1} daai^{2}	bandage	绷带	繃帶
(酒)吧	baa^{1}	bar barrister	(酒)吧 大律师	(酒)吧 大律師
啤酒	be^{1} zau^{2}	beer	啤酒	啤酒
比堅尼	bei^{2} gin^{1} nei^{4}	bikini	比基尼	比基尼
煲呔	bou^{1} taai^{1}	bow tie	领结	領結
保齡球	bou^{2} ling^{4}	bowling	保龄球	保齡球
杯葛	bui^{1} got^{3}	boycott	抵制	抵制
百家利	baak^{3} gaa^{1} lei^{6}	broccoli	西兰花	花椰菜
巴打	baa^{1} daa^{2}	brother	兄弟	兄弟
蒲飛	pou^{6} fei^{1}	buffet	自助餐	自助餐
笨豬跳	ban^{6} zyu^{1} tiu^{3}	bungee jumping	蹦极	高空彈跳
巴士	baa^{1} si^{2}	bus	公交/公交车/公共汽车	公車/公共汽車
拜拜	baai^{1} baai^{3}	bye	再见	再見
卡路里	kaa^{1} lou^{6} lei^{5}	calorie	卡路里	卡路里
咖啡因	gaa^{3} fe^{1} jan^{1}	caffeine	咖啡因	咖啡因
咭	kaat^{1}	card	卡	卡
卡通	kaa^{1} tung^{1}	cartoon	卡通	卡通
哥士的(梳打)	go^{1} si^{2} dik^{1}	caustic soda	氢氧化钠	氫氧化鈉/小蘇打
芝士	zi^{1} si^{2}	cheese	奶酪	起司
車厘子	ce^{1} lei^{4} zi^{2}	cherry	樱桃	櫻桃
朱古力	zyu^{1} gu^{1} lik^{1}	chocolate	巧克力	巧克力
西打酒	sai^{1} daa^{2}	cider	果酒	(蘋)果酒
雪茄	syut^{3} gaa^{1}	cigar	雪茄	雪茄
打咭	daa^{2} kat^{1}	clock in literally: (to) punch card	打卡	打卡
俱樂部	keoi^{1} lok^{6} bou^{6}	club	俱乐部	俱樂部
甘屎(架)/屎皮/論盡	gam^{1} si^{4}	clumsy	笨拙/笨手笨脚	笨拙/笨手笨腳
可可	ho^{2} ho^{2}	cocoa	可可	可可
可卡	ho^{2} kaa^{1}	coca	古柯	古柯
可卡因	ho^{2} kaa^{1} jan^{1}	cocaine	可卡因/古柯碱	古柯鹼
咖啡	gaa^{3} fe^{1}	coffee	咖啡	咖啡
曲奇	kuk^{1} kei^{4}	cookie	曲奇	餅乾
咕喱	gu^{1} lei^{1}	coolie	苦力	苦力
酷哥	huk^{6} go^{1}	cougar	美洲狮	美洲獅
忌廉	gei^{6} lim^{4}	cream	奶油	鮮奶油
曲(既)	kuk^{1}	crooked (bent) bend your knees winding road ahead zig-zag	弯曲	彎曲
咖喱	gaa^{3} lei^{1}	curry	咖喱	咖喱
山埃	saan^{1} aai^{1}	cyanide	氰化物	氰化物
打令	daa^{1} ling^{2}	darling	亲爱的	親愛的
(一)碟(餸)	dip^{6}	dish	一道菜	一道菜
都甩/冬甩	dou^{1} lat^{1}/dung^{1} lat^{1}	doughnut	甜甜圈	甜甜圈
(揼垃圾)	dam^{2}	dump (garbage) (In the dump/dumpster) database dump pile dump dumped by boy-/girl-friend	倒掉(垃圾)	倒掉(垃圾)
肥佬	fei^{4} lou^{2}	fail (failure)	失败	失敗
菲林	fei^{1} lam^{2}	film	㬵卷	膠卷
揮/爭取	fai^{1}	fight fight for	打架/争取	打架/爭取
Fan士	fen^{1} si^{2}	fan (fanatic) fan (machine)	粉丝	粉絲
爹地/花打	de^{1} di^{4}	daddy (father)	爸爸	爸爸
發騰	faat^{3} tang^{4}	frightened	(被)吓到	(被)嚇到
高爾夫球	gou^{1} ji^{5} fu^{1} kau^{4}	golf	高尔夫球	高爾夫球
結他	git^{3} taa^{1}	guitar	吉他	吉他
吉士	gat^{1} si^{2}	guts (courage) encourage felt like someone just punched you in the gut	胆子/勇气 鼓励	膽子/勇氣 鼓勵
哈佬/哈囉	haa^{1} lou^{3}	Hello; Halloween	哈喽	哈囉
漢堡包	hon^{3} bou^{2} baau^{1}	hamburger	汉堡（包）	漢堡
阿頭 [calque]	aa^{3} tau^{2}	the head of	领导	領導
亨里	hang^{1} lei^{5}	honey	甜心	甜心
熱狗 [calque]	jit^{6} gau^{2}	hotdog	热狗	熱狗
呼啦圈	fu^{1} laa^{1} hyun^{1}	hula hoop	呼啦圈	呼啦圈
雪糕	syut^{3} gou^{1}	ice-cream	冰淇淋/冰激凌	冰淇淋
燕梳	jin^{1} so^{1}	insure (insurance)	保险	保險
奇異果	kei^{4} ji^{6} gwo^{2}	kiwifruit	奇异果/猕猴桃	奇異果
𨋢	lip^{1}	lift (elevator)	电梯	電梯
檸檬	ning^{4} mung^{1}	lemon	柠檬	檸檬
芒果	mong^{1} gwo^{2}	mango	芒果	芒果
咪	mai^{1}	microphone	麦克风/麦/话筒	麥克風
模特兒	mou^{4} dak^{6} ji^{4}	model	模特/模特儿	模特/模特兒
摩登	mo^{1} dang^{1}	modern	摩登/现代	摩登/現代
摩打	mo^{1} daa^{2}	motor	马达/电（动）机	馬達
慕絲	mou^{1} si^{2}	mousse	慕丝	慕絲
媽咪/媽打	maa^{1} mi^{4}	mummy (mother)	妈妈	媽媽
尼龍	nei^{4} lung^{4}	nylon	尼龙	尼龍
鴉片	aa^{1} pin^{3}	opium	鸦片	鴉片
班戟	baan^{1} gik^{1}	pancake	薄煎饼	（美式）鬆餅
泊車	paak^{3} ce^{1}	parking a vehicle	停车	停車
啤梨	be^{1} lei^{2}	pear	梨子	梨子
批	pai^{1}	pie	馅饼/派	餡餅/派
乒乓波	bing^{1} bam^{1} bo^{1}	ping-pong	乒乓球	乒乓球/桌球
布冧	bou^{3} lam^{1}	plum	李子	李子
爆谷	baau^{3} guk^{1}	popcorn	爆米花	爆米花
布甸	bou^{3} din^{1}	pudding	布丁	布丁
泵	bam^{1}	pump	泵	泵/幫浦
沙律	saa^{1} leot^{2}	salad	沙拉	沙拉
三文魚	saam^{1} man^{4} jyu^{2}	salmon	鲑鱼/三文鱼	鮭魚
沙林	saa^{3} lam^{1}	salute	敬礼	敬禮
三文治	saam^{1} man^{4} zi^{6}	sandwich	三明治	三明治
沙甸魚	saa^{1} din^{1} jyu^{2}	sardine	沙丁鱼	沙丁魚
沙士	saa^{1} si^{2}	Sarsaparilla (soft drink) SARS	root beer: 根啤酒 SARS: 萨斯/非典	root beer: 沙士 SARS: (非典型肺炎)沙士
桑拿	song^{1} naa^{4}	sauna	桑拿	桑拿/三溫暖
私家褲	si^{6} gaa^{1} fu^{4}	scarf	围巾	圍巾
薯乜	syu^{4} mat^{1}	schmuck	笨蛋	笨蛋
雪利酒	syut^{3} lei^{6} zau^{2}	sherry	雪利酒	雪利酒
(表演)騷	sou^{1}	show (performance)	(表演)秀	(表演)秀
絲打	si^{1} daa^{2}	sister	姐妹	姐妹
梳打水	so^{1} daa^{2} seoi^{2}	soda	苏打水	蘇打水
梳化	so^{1} faa^{2}	sofa	沙发	沙發
(幾)梳乎	so^{1} fu^{4}	relaxing (chilling) ("soft", antonym of "firm")	舒适/舒服	舒適/舒服
士巴拿	si^{6} baa^{1} naa^{4}	spanner (wrench)	扳手	扳手
士啤	si^{6} be^{1}	spare	备用	備用
士的	si^{6} dik^{1}	stick	拐杖	拐杖
士多(店鋪)	si^{6} do^{1}	store	店铺	店鋪
士多啤梨	si^{6} do^{1} be^{1} lei^{2}	strawberry	草莓	草莓
新地	san^{1} dei^{2}	sundae	圣代	聖代
十卜	sap^{6} buk^{1}	support	支持	支持
T-恤	ti^{1} seot^{1}	T-shirt	T-恤	T-恤
塔羅牌	taap^{3} lo^{4} paai^{2}	tarot	塔罗牌	塔羅牌
的士	dik^{1} si^{2}	taxi	出租车 ("租车" = rental car)	計程車
呔	taai^{1}	tie	领带	領帶
(車)軚	taai^{1}	tire (tyre)	轮胎	輪胎
多士	do^{1} si^{2}	toast	吐司	吐司
拖肥糖	to^{1} fei^{2} tong^{2}	toffee	太妃糖	太妃糖
吞拿魚	tan^{1} naa^{4} jyu^{2}	tuna	金枪鱼	鮪魚
維他命	wai^{4} taa^{1} ming^{6}	vitamin	维生素	維他命
威化(餅)	wai^{1} faa^{3} (being^{2})	wafer biscuit wafer (electronics)	wafer biscuit: 威化饼 wafer (electronics): 晶圆	wafer biscuit: 餅乾 wafer (electronics): 晶圓
威士忌	wai^{1} si^{6} gei^{2}	whisky	威士忌	威士忌
遊艇	jau^{4} teng^{5}	yachting (yacht)	游艇	遊艇
瑜伽	jyu^{4} gaa^{1}	yoga	瑜伽	瑜迦
乳酪	jyu^{5} lok^{6}	yogurt	酸奶 ("乳酪" = cheese)	優格

==== From French ====
Chinese Characters	Jyutping	French	English	Mainland Chinese Mandarin	Taiwanese Mandarin
梳乎厘	so^{1} fu^{4} lei^{2}	soufflé	soufflé	梳芙厘	舒芙蕾
古龍水	gu^{2} lung^{4} (seoi^{2})	cologne	perfume	香水	香水
冷(衫)	laang^{1} (saam^{1})	laine	yarn	纱线	紗線

==== From Japanese ====
Chinese Characters	Jyutping	Japanese	Japanese Rōmaji	English	Mainland Chinese Mandarin	Taiwanese Mandarin
卡拉OK	kaa^{1} laa^{1} ou^{1} kei^{1}	カラオケ	karaoke	karaoke	卡拉OK	卡拉OK
老世	lou^{5} sai^{3}	世帯主	setainushi	chief (CEO) the Head (of a company) boss	老板	老闆
奸爸爹	gaan^{1} baa^{1} de^{1}	頑張って/がんばって	ganbatte	Keep up! (studying); Come on! (cheering)	加油	加油
放題	fong^{3} tai^{4}	食べ放題	tabe hōdai	buffet	布斐	自助餐
浪漫	long^{6} maan^{6}	浪漫/ロマンチック	rōman	romantic	浪漫	浪漫

=== Exported loanwords ===
==== Into English ====
English	Chinese Characters	Jyutping
add oil	加油	gaa^{1} jau^{2}
bok choy	白菜	baak^{6} coi^{3}
chop chop (hurry up)	速速	cuk^{1} cuk^{1}
chop suey	雜碎	zaap^{6} seoi^{3}
ketchup	茄汁	ke^{2} zap^{1}
kowtow	叩頭	kau^{3} tau^{4}
kwai muk	桂木	kwai^{3} muk^{6}
typhoon	颱風	toi^{4} fung^{1}

==== Into Mainland Chinese Mandarin ====
Mandarin	Cantonese	Jyutping	English	Mandarin synonyms
买单	埋單	maai^{4} daan^{1}	(Can we please have the) bill?	结账
搭档	拍檔	paak^{3} dong^{3}	partner	伙伴 (in ownership and business) 舞伴 (in dancing)
打的	搭的士	daap^{3} dik^{1} si^{2}	to ride a taxi	乘出租车
无厘头	無釐頭, corruption of 無來頭	mou^{4} lei^{4} tau^{4}	nonsensical humour (see mo lei tau) newbie who knows nothing	莫名其妙
亮仔/靓仔	靚仔	leng^{3} zai^{2}	handsome boy	帅哥儿 俊男 哥们 (in China only)
拍拖	拍拖	paak^{3} to^{1}	dating	追求 求爱
很正	好正	hou^{2} zeng^{3}	(colloquial) awesome; perfect; just right	很棒
搞掂/搞定	搞掂	gaau^{2} dim^{6}	Is it done yet? (It's) Done! It has been taken care of!	办妥 做完 做好 弄完

==== Into Taiwanese Mandarin ====
Taiwanese Mandarin	Hanyu Pinyin	Cantonese	Jyutping	English
(猴)塞雷	(hóu) sāiléi	(好)犀利	hou^{2} sai^{1} lei^{6}	(very) impressive
Hold住	hòu zhù	Hold住	hou^{1} zyu^{6}	hold on hang tight (hang in there)

==== Into Japanese ====
Japanese Kana (Kanji)	Japanese Rōmaji	Chinese Characters	Jyutping	English
ヤムチャ (飲茶)	yamucha	飲茶	jam^{2} caa^{4}	yum cha
チャーシュー (叉焼)	chāshū	叉燒	caa^{1} siu^{1}	char siu
チャーハン (炒飯)	chāhan	炒飯	caau^{2} faan^{6}	fried rice

== Code-switching and loanword adaptation ==
Hong Kong Cantonese has a high number of foreign loanwords. Sometimes, the parts of speech of the incorporated words are changed. In some examples, some new meanings of English words are even created. For example, "至yeah", literally "the most yeah", means "the trendiest". Originally, "yeah" means "yes/okay" in English, but it means "trendy" when being incorporated into Hong Kong Cantonese (Cf. "yeah baby" and French "yé-yé").

Semantic change is common in loanwords; when foreign words are borrowed into Cantonese, polysyllabic words and monosyllabic words tend to become disyllabic, and the second syllable is in the Upper Rising tone (the second tone). For example, "kon_{1} si_{2}" (coins), "sek^{6} kiu^{1}" (security) and "ka^{1} si^{2}" (cast). A few polysyllabic words become monosyllabic though, like "mon^{1}" (monitor), literally means computer monitor. And some new Cantonese lexical items are created according to the morphology of Cantonese. For example, "laai^{1} 記" from the word "library". Most of the disyllabic words and some of the monosyllabic words are incorporated as their original pronunciation, with some minor changes according to the Cantonese phonotactics.

Incorporating words from foreign languages into Cantonese is acceptable to most Cantonese speakers. Hong Kong Cantonese speakers frequently code-mix although they can distinguish foreign words from Cantonese ones. For instance, "噉都唔 make sense", literally means "that doesn't make sense". After a Cantonese speaker decides to code-mix a foreign word in a Cantonese sentence, syntactical rules of Cantonese will be followed. For instance, "sure" (肯定) can be used like "你 su^{1} 唔 su^{1} aa^{3}?" (are you sure?) as if it were its Cantonese counterpart "你肯唔肯定?", using the A-not-A question construction.

In some circumstances, code-mixing is preferable because it can simplify sentences. An excellent example (though dated) of the convenience and efficiency of such mixing is "打 collect call" replacing "打一個由對方付款嘅長途電話", i.e. 13 syllables reduced to four.

Mechanisms of Phonological Adaptation

The previously mentioned above examples show how common language mixing is in Hong Kong but these insertions are not arbitrary. Rather, they are controlled by systematic linguistic limitations that determine how foreign elements go from temporary conversational code-switches to long-term lexical borrowings. The recipient language (Cantonese) absorbs foreign lexical elements by what Sarah G. Thomason (2001) refers to as a systematic process of borrowing, which causes the incoming vocabulary to adhere to its internal "sound laws" while strictly maintaining its own native structural integrity. The extensive bilingualism in Hong Kong, where speakers naturally transcend linguistic borders to enhance communicative efficiency without disrupting the fundamental grammar of their primary tongue, accelerates this contact-induced process.

=== Tonal Assignment and Stress Mapping ===
Cantonese lacks structural equivalents to English stress accents since it is a restricted tone language with six different lexical tones. Pitch prominence and duration are two acoustic characteristics of English stress that speakers methodically project onto the Cantonese tonal register when English loanwords are incorporated into Hong Kong Cantonese.

This mapping functions consistently during early perceptual scansions, according to Daniel Silverman's (1992) two-level model of loanword phonology. Loanword integration takes place at two different operational stages: a native phonological level where illegal structures undergo modifications and a perceptual level where the raw acoustic signal is received. English's prominent, emphasized syllables are seen as high pitch variations across linguistic boundaries. Consequently, they are consistently mapped onto either the high-rising tone (e.g., 35) or the high-level tone (e.g., 55), Tone 1 (e.g., 55). On the other hand, unstressed syllables are usually assigned to lower register tones based only on their position in the word string and relative syllable weight. This explains why card receives a high-level tone on its primary root (kaat1) and why the stressed beginning syllable in taxi maps to a high-level tone (dik1-si2). The phenomenon mentioned above, in which adapted words prefer a higher rising tone (tone 2) on final syllables to indicate formal lexical integration, is explained by this structural mapping.This localized tonal assignment has a specific sociolinguistic purpose: it indicates that a temporary code-switched item has formally become a fully conventionalized loanword in the standard Cantonese lexicon.

=== Syllabic Restructuring and Vowel Epenthesis ===
The syllable coda position in Cantonese is strongly restricted to vowels, nasals (/m, n, ŋ/), or unreleased unvoiced stops (/p, t, k/). The syllable template is maximally structured as (C)V(C). In contrast, English phonotactics allow for extremely complex consonant clusters (such as CCVC and CVCC) in both onset and coda positions. Cantonese loanword adaptation uses either deletion (the structural shortening of consonants) or epenthesis (the insertion of dummy vowels) to successfully resolve these phonotactically illegal strings and produce well-formed native structures.

The maximally nonspecific native vowels /i/, /u/, or a localized central vowel are typically inserted to accomplish vowel epenthesis. The immediate phonetic environment influences the exact choice of the epenthetic vowel; alveolar or palatal situations significantly support unrounded front vowels, while labial consonants heavily favor round vowels. In Cantonese, for instance, the liquid and nasal coda cluster in the word "film" is phonotactically prohibited. In order to separate the cluster and create the well-formed disyllabic pattern fei1-lum2, speakers insert an epenthetic vowel. In contrast, the system often uses structural truncation to meet native patterns when processing complicated polysyllabic phrases like monitor, reducing the word to a single monosyllabic foot (mon1). A native economy principle is reflected in this preference for truncation over extensive epenthesis, which keeps loanwords from becoming unwieldy and guarantees that they flow seamlessly within conversational speech

=== Vowel System Adaptation ===
The intricate English vowel system, which mostly depends on tense/lax differences, is structurally reduced into the smaller Cantonese vowel phoneme inventory when English vowels are mapped onto it. According to extenstive empirical research by scholars like Stephen Matthews (2011), Robert S. Bauer (2006), and David Silverman (1992), these vowel changes are very predictable based on relative vowel duration and acoustic proximity.

Because Cantonese relies heavily on vowel length distinctions rather than just tense or lax qualities, English tense vowels naturally map onto long Cantonese equivalents, whereas English lax vowels are compressed into short native variants. This structural synchronization prevents the loss of phonemic contrasts during language contact, allowing bilingual communities to maintain maximum phonetic clarity when integrating foreign vocabulary.

English Source Vowel	Cantonese Target Vowel	English Example	Cantonese Adaptation	Jyutping
/ʌ/ (Lax open-mid)	/aa/ or /a/	Bus	巴士	baa1-si2
/iː/ (Tense high-front)	/ei/ or /i/	Cream	忌廉	gei6-lim4
/ɒ/ or /ɔː/ (Back open)	/o/	Chocolate	朱古力	zyu1-gu1-lik6
/ɪ/ (Lax high-front)	/ei/	Tip	貼士	tip1-si2

Code-mixed items gradually lose their foreign phonological character through these methodical, rule-governed modifications, becoming structurally identical to native Cantonese lexical items. This shows that language contact in Hong Kong is a highly structured linguistic system rather than a random deterioration of language norms.

The community expands its vocabulary while preserving the phonological bounds and structural independence of Hong Kong Cantonese through these adaptation mechanisms.

== Short-text adaptations ==
=== Abbreviation ===
Abbreviations are commonly used in Hong Kong and have flourished with the use of short messaging over the Internet. Some examples:

Table of Abbreviation
Original term	Abbreviated term	Explanation
Cantonese: 唔知(m4 zi1) English: do not know	5G (ng5 G) Example: 甲: 你知唔知邊個係比德? 乙: 我5G English: A: Do you know who Peter is? B: I don't know (5G).	The "5" here is not pronounced as "five" but in Cantonese "ng5", which corresponds to the Chinese word "五" (ng5). Since "五"(ng5) and "唔" (m4), "知" (zi1) and "G" have similar pronunciations, "5G" is used to replace the Cantonese term 唔知, which carries the meaning of "don't know".
Cantonese:鍾意(zung1 ji3) English: Like	中2 (zung3 ji6) Example: 我好中2佢呀! English: I like (中2 zung3 ji6) him so much!	Due to similar pronunciation, the "2" here is pronounced as the Chinese "二" (ji6) rather than "two". Combining this number with the Chinese character "中" (zung3), it carries similar pronunciation as "鍾意"(zung1 ji3) but the structure is much simpler.
Cantonese:師奶 (si1 naai1) English: Housewife	C9 Example: 你著到成個C9咁 English: You dress like a housewife(C9).	The word C9 should be pronounced in English "C nine", which is very similar to Cantonese si1 naai1. It is an easier form of typing the word "師奶" without changing the meaning in Cantonese. The two characters are already on the keyboard so it is much simpler to type.
7-Eleven (7–11)	Se-fun(音:些粉)/ Chat1 Jai2(七仔） Example: 去些粉/七仔買野飲先 English : Let's go to 7-Eleven (Se-fun 些粉) to buy some drinks.	"Chat1" is the Chinese word of seven and "Jai2" is son or boy
Take Away(外賣)	Haang4 Gai1(行街) (literal: walk on the street) Example: 魚蛋粉行街! English: Fish Ball Noodles for take-away! (Haang4 Gai1 行街)	This abbreviation is often used in Hong Kong-style cafés for take-away.
Uh-huh	55 Example: 甲: 你今日要番學? 乙:55 English: A: Do you need to attend school today? B:Yea.(55)	Homophonic for "ng ng" (嗯嗯) which indicates agreement or understanding.
Post (發表／張貼)	po Example: 我po咗相 English: I posted (po) a photo.	example of common omission of final consonant (not naturally occurring in Cantonese)

== See also ==
- Bilingualism in Hong Kong
- Cantonese profanity
- Code-switching in Hong Kong
- Proper Cantonese pronunciation
- Comparison of national standards of Chinese
- Hong Kong English
- The Linguistic Society of Hong Kong, whose Cantonese Romanization Scheme is known as Jyutping
- Varieties of Chinese
