= Comparison of Cantonese transcription systems =

Comparison of common Cantonese transcription systems

The chart below shows the difference between S. L. Wong romanization, the Cantonese Transliteration Scheme, ILE romanization, Jyutping, Yale, Sidney Lau, Meyer–Wempe, along with IPA, S. L. Wong phonetic symbols and Cantonese bopomofo.

== Chart ==
=== Initials ===
	IPA	S. L. Wong Phonetic Symbols	Bopomofo	S. L. Wong Romanization	Cantonese Transliteration Scheme	ILE	Jyutping	Yale	Sidney Lau	Meyer– Wempe
巴	[p]	/b/	ㄅ	b	b	b	b	b	b	p
怕	[pʰ]	/p/	ㄆ	p	p	p	p	p	p	p'
媽	[m]	/m/	ㄇ	m	m	m	m	m	m	m
花	[f]	/f/	ㄈ	f	f	f	f	f	f	f
打	[t]	/d/	ㄉ	d	d	d	d	d	d	t
他	[tʰ]	/t/	ㄊ	t	t	t	t	t	t	t'
那	[n]	/n/	ㄋ	n	n	n	n	n	n	n
啦	[l]	/l/	ㄌ	l	l	l	l	l	l	l
家	[k]	/g/	ㄍ	g	g	g	g	g	g	k
卡	[kʰ]	/k/	ㄎ	k	k	k	k	k	k	k'
牙	[ŋ]	/ŋ/	ㄫ	ng	ng	ng	ng	ng	ng	ng
蝦	[h]	/h/	ㄏ	h	h	h	h	h	h	h
將	[ts]	/dz/	ㄗ	dz	z	dz	z	j	j	ts
張	[tɕ]	/dz₂/	ㄐ	dj	j	dz	z	j	j	ch
鏘	[tsʰ]	/ts/	ㄘ	ts	c	ts	c	ch	ch	ts'
昌	[tɕʰ]	/ts₂/	ㄑ	ch	q	ts	c	ch	ch	ch'
士	[s]	/s/	ㄙ	s	s	s	s	s	s	s
是	[ɕ]	/s₂/	ㄒ	sh	x	s	s	s	s	sh
瓜	[kʷ]	/gw/	ㄍㄨ	gw	gu	gw	gw	gw	gw	kw
誇	[kʷʰ]	/kw/	ㄎㄨ	kw	ku	kw	kw	kw	kw	k'w
也	[j]	/j/	ㄧ	y	y	j	j	y	y	y/i
華	[w]	/w/	ㄨ	w	w	w	w	w	w	w/oo

=== Finals ===
	IPA	S. L. Wong Phonetic Symbols	Bopomofo	S. L. Wong Romanization	Cantonese Transliteration Scheme	ILE	Jyutping	Yale	Sidney Lau	Meyer– Wempe
呀	[aː]	/a/	ㄚ	a	a	aa	aa	a	a	a
挨	[aːi]	/ai/	ㄞ	aai	ai	aai	aai	aai	aai	aai
拗	[aːu]	/au/	ㄠ	aau	ao	aau	aau	aau	aau	aau
啱	[aːm]	/am/	ㆰ	aam	am	aam	aam	aam	aam	aam
晏	[aːn]	/an/	ㄢ	aan	an	aan	aan	aan	aan	aan
罌	[aːŋ]	/aŋ/	ㄤ	aang	ang	aang	aang	aang	aang	aang
鴨	[aːp̚]	/ap/	ㄚㆴ	aap	ab	aap	aap	aap	aap	aap
押	[aːt̚]	/at/	ㄚㆵ	aat	ad	aat	aat	aat	aat	aat
軛	[aːk̚]	/ak/	ㄚㆶ	aak	ag	aak	aak	aak	aak	aak
矮	[ɐi]	/ɐi/	ㄞ	ai	ei	ai	ai	ai	ai	ai
歐	[ɐu]	/ɐu/	ㄠ	au	eo	au	au	au	au	au
庵	[ɐm]	/ɐm/	ㆰ/ㆱ	am	em	am	am	am	am	am/om
奀	[ɐn]	/ɐn/	ㄢ	an	en	an	an	an	an	an
鶯	[ɐŋ]	/ɐŋ/	ㄤ	ang	eng	ang	ang	ang	ang	ang
噏	[ɐp̚]	/ɐp/	ㄚㆴ	ap	eb	ap	ap	ap	ap	ap/op
兀	[ɐt̚]	/ɐt/	ㄚㆵ	at	ed	at	at	at	at	at
搤	[ɐk̚]	/ɐk/	ㄚㆶ	ak	eg	ak	ak	ak	ak	ak
誒	[ɛː]	/ɛ/	ㄝ	e	é	e	e	e	e	e
欸	[ei]	/ei/	ㄟ	ei	éi	ei	ei	ei	ei	ei
(掉)*	[ɛːu]	/ɛu/	ㄝㄨ			eu	eu			
(舔)*	[ɛːm]	/ɛm/	ㄝㆬ			em	em			
(円)*	[ɛːn]	/ɛn/	ㄝㄣ			en	en			
(贏)	[ɛːŋ]	/ɛŋ/	ㄝㆭ	eng	éng	eng	eng	eng	eng	eng
(夾)*	[ɛːp̚]	/ɛp/	ㄝㆴ			ep	ep			
( )	[ɛːt̚]	/ɛt/	ㄝㆵ			et	et			
(尺)	[ɛːk̚]	/ɛk/	ㄝㆶ	ek	ég	ek	ek	ek	ek	ek
衣	[iː]	/i/	ㄧ	i	i	i	i	i	i	i
妖	[iːu]	/iu/	ㄧㄨ	iu	iu	iu	iu	iu	iu	iu
淹	[iːm]	/im/	ㄧㆬ	im	im	im	im	im	im	im
煙	[iːn]	/in/	ㄧㄣ	in	in	in	in	in	in	in
英	[eŋ]	/eŋ/	ㆬ	ing	ing	ing	ing	ing	ing	ing
葉	[iːp̚]	/ip/	ㄧㆴ	ip	ib	ip	ip	ip	ip	ip
熱	[iːt̚]	/it/	ㄧㆵ	it	id	it	it	it	it	it
益	[ek̚]	/ek/	ㄧㆶ	ik	ig	ik	ik	ik	ik	ik
柯	[ɔː]	/ɔ/	ㄛ	o	o	o	o	o	oh	oh
哀	[ɔːy]	/ɔi/	ㄛㄧ	oi	oi	oi	oi	oi	oi	oi
奧	[ou]	/ou/	ㄡ	ou	ou	ou	ou	ou	o	o
安	[ɔːn]	/ɔn/	ㄛㄣ	on	on	on	on	on	on	on
盎	[ɔːŋ]	/ɔŋ/	ㆲ	ong	ong	ong	ong	ong	ong	ong
(渴)	[ɔːt̚]	/ɔt/	ㄛㆵ	ot	od	ot	ot	ot	ot	ot
惡	[ɔːk̚]	/ɔk/	ㄛㆶ	ok	og	ok	ok	ok	ok	ok
烏	[uː]	/u/	ㄨ	u	u	u	u	u	oo	oo
煨	[uːy]	/ui/	ㄨㄧ	ui	ui	ui	ui	ui	ooi	ooi
碗	[uːn]	/un/	ㄨㄣ	un	un	un	un	un	oon	oon
甕	[oŋ]	/uŋ/	ㄛㆭ	ung	ung	ung	ung	ung	ung	ung
活	[uːt̚]	/ut/	ㄨㆵ	ut	ud	ut	ut	ut	oot	oot
屋	[ok̚]	/uk/	ㄨㆶ	uk	ug	uk	uk	uk	uk	uk
靴	[œː]	/œ/	ㄜ	eu	ê	oe	oe	eu	euh	oeh
(央)	[œːŋ]	/œŋ/	ㄥ	eung	êng	oeng	oeng	eung	eung	eung
(約)	[œːk̚]	/œk/	ㄜㆶ	euk	êg	oek	oek	euk	euk	euk
(銳)	[ɵy]	/œy/	ㄜㄩ	eue	êu	oey	eoi	eui	ui	ui
(閏)	[ɵn]	/œn/	ㄣ	eun	ên	oen	eon	eun	un	un
(律)	[ɵt̚]	/œt/	ㄛㆵ	eut	êd	oet	eot	eut	ut	ut
於	[yː]	/y/	ㄩ	ue	ü	y	yu	yu	ue	ue
冤	[yːn]	/yn/	ㄩㄣ	uen	ün	yn	yun	yun	uen	uen
月	[yːt̚]	/yt/	ㄩㆵ	uet	üd	yt	yut	yut	uet	uet
唔	[m̩]	/m/	ㆬ	m	m	m	m	m	m	m
五	[ŋ̍]	/ŋ/	ㆭ	ng	ng	ng	ng	ng	ng	ng

=== Tones ===
IPA	Jyutping	ILE	Yale	Cantonese Transliteration Scheme	Sidney Lau
íː	i1	i^{1}	ī	i^{1}	i^{1˚}
îː	i1	i^{1}	ì	i^{1}	i^{1}
ǐː	i2	i^{2}	í	i^{2}	i^{2}
īː	i3	i^{3}	i	i^{3}	i^{3}
i̭ː	i4	i^{4}	ìh	i^{4}	i^{4}
i̬ː	i5	i^{5}	íh	i^{5}	i^{5}
ìː	i6	i^{6}	ih	i^{6}	i^{6}
ɪ́k̚	ik1	ik^{7}	īk	ig^{1}	ik^{1}
ɪ̄k̚	ik3	ik^{8}	ik	ig^{3}	ik^{3}
ɪ̀k̚	ik6	ik^{9}	ihk	ig^{6}	ik^{6}
