= Sidney Lau =

Hong Kong linguist and Cantonese teacher

Sidney Lau Sek-cheung
- 劉錫祥
- Died: 1987
- Education: Sun Yat Sen University
- Known for: Teaching Cantonese
- Notable work: A practical Cantonese-English dictionary

Chinese name
- Traditional Chinese: 劉錫祥
- Simplified Chinese: 刘锡祥
Transcriptions
Standard Mandarin
- Hanyu Pinyin: Liú Xīxiáng
Yue: Cantonese
- Yale Romanization: Làuh Sek-chèuhng
- Jyutping: Lau^{4} Sek^{3}coeng^{4}
- Sidney Lau: Lau^{4} Sek^{3}ceung^{4}

Sidney Lau Sek-cheung (劉錫祥; died 1987) was a Cantonese teacher in the Chinese Language Section of the Government Training Division and Principal of the Government Language School of the Hong Kong Government. He had graduated bachelor of arts from Sun Yat-sen University in Guangzhou, China.

== Career ==
Lau wrote a series of textbooks in the 1960s and 1970s, for teaching Anglophones to speak Cantonese. The textbooks were initially used for teaching western expatriates working in the Hong Kong Police Force and other government bodies. Later the texts were used as a basis for a radio teaching programme for foreigners.

Lau's books introduced his own romanisation system, Sidney Lau romanisation, which differs from the widely used Yale system and the prior Standard Romanisation by using superscripted numbers to indicate the tones of the words. 16 years later, the creators of the Jyutping romanization system also decided to use tone numbers, albeit not in superscript. The romanisation system in use by the Hong Kong government is called the Government System or the Dyer-Ball/Eitel system, and it is not Lau's.

Lau's A Practical Cantonese-English Dictionary, with 22,000 Cantonese entries, was published by the Hong Kong government in 1977, and reviewed favorably by Dew in the Journal of Chinese Linguistics.

Despite five decades since publication, the books remain popular, being among the few comprehensive courses teaching spoken Cantonese (as opposed to written Chinese and spoken Mandarin, which are significantly different).

== See also ==
- Sidney Lau romanisation, a Romanisation system for Cantonese
