= Romanization =

Transliteration or transcription to Latin letters

Mandarin Chinese, like many languages, can be romanized in a number of ways; above: Traditional and Simplified Chinese characters meaning Chinese, and romanization systems Hanyu Pinyin, Gwoyeu Romatzyh, Wade-Giles and Yale for those characters.

In linguistics, romanization or romanisation is the conversion of text from a different writing system to the Roman (Latin) script, or a system for doing so. Methods of romanization include transliteration, for representing written text, and transcription, for representing the spoken word, and combinations of both. Transcription methods can be subdivided into phonemic transcription, which records the phonemes or units of semantic meaning in speech, and more strict phonetic transcription, which records speech sounds with precision.

== Methods ==
There are many consistent or standardized romanization systems. They can be classified by their characteristics. A particular system's characteristics may make it better-suited for various, sometimes contradictory applications, including document retrieval, linguistic analysis, easy readability, faithful representation of pronunciation.

- Source, or donor language – A system may be tailored to romanize text from a particular language, or a series of languages, or for any language in a particular writing system. A language-specific system typically preserves language features like pronunciation, while the general one may be better for cataloguing international texts.
- Target, or receiver language – Most systems are intended for an audience that speaks or reads a particular language. (So-called international romanization systems for Cyrillic text are based on central-European alphabets like the Czech and Croatian alphabet.)
- Simplicity – Since the basic Latin alphabet has a smaller number of letters than many other writing systems, digraphs, diacritics, or special characters must be used to represent them all in Latin script. This affects the ease of creation, digital storage and transmission, reproduction, and reading of the romanized text.
- Reversibility – Whether or not the original can be restored from the converted text. Some reversible systems allow for an irreversible simplified version.

=== Transliteration ===
If the romanization attempts to transliterate the original script, the guiding principle is a one-to-one mapping of characters in the source language into the target script, with less emphasis on how the result sounds when pronounced according to the reader's language. For example, the Nihon-shiki romanization of Japanese allows the informed reader to reconstruct the original Japanese kana syllables with 100% accuracy, but requires additional knowledge for correct pronunciation.

=== Transcription ===
==== Phonemic ====
Most romanizations are intended to enable the casual reader who is unfamiliar with the original script to pronounce the source language reasonably accurately. Such romanizations follow the principle of phonemic transcription and attempt to render the significant sounds (phonemes) of the original as faithfully as possible in the target language. The popular Hepburn Romanization of Japanese is an example of a transcriptive romanization designed for English speakers.

==== Phonetic ====
A phonetic conversion goes one step further and attempts to depict all phones in the source language, sacrificing legibility if necessary by using characters or conventions not found in the target script. In practice such a representation almost never tries to represent every possible allophone—especially those that occur naturally due to coarticulation effects—and instead limits itself to the most significant allophonic distinctions. The International Phonetic Alphabet is the most common system of phonetic transcription.

=== Compromise ===
For most language pairs, building a usable romanization involves a trade-off between the two extremes. Pure transcriptions are generally not possible, as the source language usually contains sounds and distinctions not found in the target language, but which must be shown for the romanized form to be comprehensible. Furthermore, due to diachronic and synchronic variance no written language represents any spoken language with perfect accuracy and the vocal interpretation of a script may vary by a great degree among languages. In modern times the chain of transcription is usually spoken foreign language, written foreign language, written native language, spoken (read) native language. Reducing the number of those processes, i.e. removing one or both steps of writing, usually leads to more accurate oral articulations. In general, outside a limited audience of scholars, romanizations tend to lean more towards transcription. As an example, consider the Japanese martial art 柔術: the Nihon-shiki romanization zyûzyutu may allow someone who knows Japanese to reconstruct the kana syllables じゅうじゅつ, but most native English speakers, or rather readers, would find it easier to guess the pronunciation from the Hepburn version, jūjutsu.

== Romanization of specific writing systems ==
=== Arabic ===
The Arabic script is used to write Arabic, Persian, Urdu, Pashto and Sindhi as well as numerous other languages in the Muslim world, particularly African and Asian languages without alphabets of their own. Romanization standards include the following:

==== Arabic ====
- Deutsche Morgenländische Gesellschaft (1936): Adopted by the International Convention of Orientalist Scholars in Rome. It is the basis for the very influential Hans Wehr dictionary (ISBN 0-87950-003-4).
- BS 4280 (1968): Developed by the British Standards Institution
- SATTS (1970s): A one-for-one substitution system, a legacy from the Morse code era
- UNGEGN (1972)
- DIN 31635 (1982): Developed by the Deutsches Institut für Normung (German Institute for Standardization)
- ISO 233 (1984). Transliteration.
- Qalam (1985): A system that focuses upon preserving the spelling, rather than the pronunciation, and uses mixed case
- ISO 233-2 (1993): Simplified transliteration.
- Buckwalter transliteration (1990s): Developed at Xerox by Tim Buckwalter; does not require unusual diacritics
- ALA-LC (1997)
- Arabic chat alphabet

==== Persian ====
Consonants
Unicode	Persian letter	IPA	DMG (1969)	ALA-LC (1997)	BGN/PCGN (1958)	EI (1960)	EI (2012)	UN (1967)	UN (2012)	Pronunciation
U+0627	ا	ʔ, ∅ (Note: Used as a vowel as well.)	ʾ, — (Note: Hamzeh and eyn are not transliterated at the beginning of words.)	ʼ, —				ʾ		as in uh-oh
U+0628	ب	b	b							B as in Bob
U+067E	پ	p	p							P as in pet
U+062A	ت	t	t							T as in tall
U+062B	ث	s	s̱	s̱	s̄	t͟h	ṯ	s̄	s	S as in sand
U+062C	ج	dʒ	ǧ	j	j	d͟j	j	j		J as in jam
U+0686	چ	tʃ	č	ch	ch	č		ch	č	Ch as in Charlie
U+062D	ح	h	ḥ	ḥ	ḩ/ḥ (Note: The dot below may be used instead of cedilla.)	ḥ		ḩ	h	H as in holiday
U+062E	خ	x	ḫ	kh	kh	k͟h	ḵ	kh	x	somewhat resembling German Ch
U+062F	د	d	d							D as in Dave
U+0630	ذ	z	ẕ	ẕ	z̄	d͟h	ḏ	z̄	z	Z as in zero
U+0631	ر	r	r							R as in rabbit
U+0632	ز	z	z							Z as in zero
U+0698	ژ	ʒ	ž	zh	zh	z͟h	ž	zh	ž	S as in television or G as in genre
U+0633	س	s	s							S as in Sam
U+0634	ش	ʃ	š	sh	sh	s͟h	š	sh	š	Sh as in sheep
U+0635	ص	s	ṣ	ṣ	ş/ṣ	ṣ		ş	s	S as in Sam
U+0636	ض	z	ż	z̤	ẕ	ḍ	ż	ẕ	z	Z as in zero
U+0637	ط	t	ṭ	ṭ	ţ/ṭ	ṭ		ţ	t	t as in tank
U+0638	ظ	z	ẓ	ẓ	z̧/ẓ	ẓ	ẓ	z̧	z	Z as in zero
U+0639	ع	ʕ	ʿ	ʻ	ʼ	ʻ	ʻ	ʿ	ʿ	_____
U+063A	غ	ɢ~ɣ	ġ	gh	gh	g͟h	ḡ	gh	q	somewhat resembling French R
U+0641	ف	f	f							F as in Fred
U+0642	ق	ɢ~ɣ	q			ḳ		q		somewhat resembling French R
U+06A9	ک	k	k							C as in card
U+06AF	گ	ɡ	g							G as in go
U+0644	ل	l	l							L as in lamp
U+0645	م	m	m							M as in Michael
U+0646	ن	n	n							N as in name
U+0648	و	v~w (Note: At the beginning of words the combination ⟨خو⟩ was pronounced /xw/ or /xʷ/ in Classical Persian. In modern varieties the glide /ʷ/ has been lost, though the spelling has not been changed. It may be still heard in Dari as a relict pronunciation. The combination /xʷa/ was changed to /xo/ (see below).)	v				v, w (Note: In Dari.)	v		V as in vision
U+0647	ه	h	h	h	h (Note: Not transliterated at the end of words.)	h		h	h	H as in hot
U+0629	ة	∅, t	—	h (Note: In the combination ⟨یة⟩ at the end of words.)	—	t (Note: When used instead of ⟨ت⟩ at the end of words.)	h	—	—	
U+06CC	ی	j	y							Y as in Yale
U+0621	ء	ʔ, ∅	ʾ	ʼ				ʾ		
U+0623	أ	ʔ, ∅	ʾ	ʼ				ʾ		
U+0624	ؤ	ʔ, ∅	ʾ	ʼ				ʾ		
U+0626	ئ	ʔ, ∅	ʾ	ʼ				ʾ		

Vowels (Note: Diacritical signs (harekat) are rarely written.)
Unicode	Final	Medial	Initial	Isolated	IPA	DMG (1969)	ALA-LC (1997)	BGN/PCGN (1958)	EI (2012)	UN (1967)	UN (2012)	Pronunciation
U+064E	ـَ	ـَ	اَ	اَ	æ	a	a	a	a	a	a	A as in cat
U+064F	ـُ	ـُ	اُ	اُ	o	o	o	o	u	o	o	O as in go
U+0648 U+064F	ـو	ـو	—	—	o (Note: After ⟨خ⟩ from the earlier /xʷa/. Often transliterated as xwa or xva. For example, خور /xor/ "sun" was /xʷar/ in Classical Persian.)	o	o	o	u	o	o	O as in go
U+0650	ـِ	ـِ	اِ	اِ	e	e	i	e	e	e	e	E as in ten
U+064E U+0627	ـَا	ـَا	آ	آ	ɑː~ɒː	ā	ā	ā	ā	ā	ā	O as in hot
U+0622	ـآ	ـآ	آ	آ	ɑː~ɒː	ā, ʾā (Note: After vowels.)	ā, ʼā	ā	ā	ā	ā	O as in hot
U+064E U+06CC	ـَی	—	—	—	ɑː~ɒː	ā	á	á	ā	á	ā	O as in hot
U+06CC U+0670	ـیٰ	—	—	—	ɑː~ɒː	ā	á	á	ā	ā	ā	O as in hot
U+064F U+0648	ـُو	ـُو	اُو	اُو	uː, oː	ū	ū	ū	u, ō	ū	u	U as in actual
U+0650 U+06CC	ـی	ـیـ	ایـ	ای	iː, eː	ī	ī	ī	i, ē	ī	i	Y as in happy
U+064E U+0648	ـَو	ـَو	اَو	اَو	ow~aw	au	aw	ow	ow, aw	ow	ow	O as in go
U+064E U+06CC	ـَی	ـَیـ	اَیـ	اَی	ej~aj	ai	ay	ey	ey, ay	ey	ey	Ay as in play
U+064E U+06CC	ـیِ	—	—	—	–e, –je	–e, –ye	–i, –yi	–e, –ye	–e, –ye	–e, –ye	–e, –ye	Ye as in yes
U+06C0	ـهٔ	—	—	—	–je	–ye	–ʼi	–ye	–ye	–ye	–ye	Ye as in yes

=== Georgian ===
Georgian letter	IPA	National system (2002)	BGN/PCGN (1981–2009)	ISO 9984 (1996)	ALA-LC (1997)	Unofficial system	Kartvelo translit	NGR2
ა	/ɑ/	a	a	a	a	a	a	a
ბ	/b/	b	b	b	b	b	b	b
გ	/ɡ/	g	g	g	g	g	g	g
დ	/d/	d	d	d	d	d	d	d
ე	/ɛ/	e	e	e	e	e	e	e
ვ	/v/	v	v	v	v	v	v	v
ზ	/z/	z	z	z	z	z	z	z
ჱ (Note: Archaic letters.)	/eɪ/		ey	ē	ē	é	ej	ẽ
თ	/tʰ/	t	tʼ	t̕	tʻ	T (Note: These are influenced by aforementioned layout, and are preferred to avoid ambiguity, as an expressions: t, j, g, ch can mean two letters.) or t	t	t / t̊
ი	/i/	i	i	i	i	i	i	i
კ	/kʼ/	kʼ	k	k	k	k	ǩ	k̉
ლ	/l/	l	l	l	l	l	l	l
მ	/m/	m	m	m	m	m	m	m
ნ	/n/	n	n	n	n	n	n	n
ჲ	/i/, /j/		j	y	y		j	ĩ
ო	/ɔ/	o	o	o	o	o	o	o
პ	/pʼ/	pʼ	p	p	p	p	p̌	p̉
ჟ	/ʒ/	zh	zh	ž	ž	J, zh or j	ž	g̃
რ	/r/	r	r	r	r	r	r	r
ს	/s/	s	s	s	s	s	s	s
ტ	/tʼ/	tʼ	t	t	t	t	t̆	t̉
ჳ	/w/			w	w		ŭ	f̃
უ	/u/	u	u	u	u	u	u	u
ფ	/pʰ/	p	pʼ	p̕	pʻ	p or f	p	p / p̊
ქ	/kʰ/	k	kʼ	k̕	kʻ	q or k	q or k	k / k̊
ღ	/ʁ/	gh	gh	ḡ	ġ	g, gh or R	g, gh or R	q̃
ყ	/qʼ/	qʼ	q	q	q	y (Note: Initially, the use of letter y for ყ is most probably due to their resemblance to each other.)	q	q
შ	/ʃ/	sh	sh	š	š	sh or S	š	x
ჩ	/t͡ʃ(ʰ)/	ch	chʼ	č̕	čʻ	ch or C	č	c̃
ც	/t͡s(ʰ)/	ts	tsʼ	c̕	cʻ	c or ts	c	c
ძ	/d͡z/	dz	dz	j	ż	dz or Z	ʒ	d̃
წ	/t͡sʼ/	tsʼ	ts	c	c	w, c or ts	ʃ	c̉
ჭ	/t͡ʃʼ/	chʼ	ch	č	č	W, ch or tch	ʃ̌	j̉
ხ	/χ/	kh	kh	x	x	x or kh (rarely)	x	k̃
ჴ	/q/, /qʰ/		qʼ	ẖ	x̣		q̌	q̊
ჯ	/d͡ʒ/	j	j	ǰ	j	j	-	j
ჰ	/h/	h	h	h	h	h	h	h
ჵ	/oː/			ō	ō		ȯ	h̃

=== Greek ===
There are romanization systems for both Modern and Ancient Greek.

- ALA-LC
- Beta Code
- Greeklish
- ISO 843 (1997)

=== Hebrew ===
The Hebrew alphabet is romanized using several standards:

- ANSI Z39.25 (1975)
- UNGEGN (1977)
- ISO 259 (1984): Transliteration.
- ISO 259-2 (1994): Simplified transliteration.
- ISO/DIS 259-3: Phonemic transcription.
- ALA-LC

=== Indic (Brahmic) scripts ===
The Brahmic family of abugidas is used for languages of the Indian subcontinent and south-east Asia. There is a long tradition in the west to study Sanskrit and other Indic texts in Latin transliteration. Various transliteration conventions have been used for Indic scripts since the time of Sir William Jones.

- ISO 15919 (2001): A standard transliteration convention was codified in the ISO 15919 standard. It uses diacritics to map the much larger set of Brahmic consonants and vowels to the Latin script. The Devanagari-specific portion is very similar to the academic standard, IAST: "International Alphabet of Sanskrit Transliteration", and to the United States Library of Congress standard, ALA-LC, although there are a few differences
- The National Library at Kolkata romanization, intended for the romanization of all Indic scripts, is an extension of IAST
- Harvard-Kyoto: Uses upper and lower case and doubling of letters, to avoid the use of diacritics, and to restrict the range to 7-bit ASCII.
- ITRANS: a transliteration scheme into 7-bit ASCII created by Avinash Chopde that used to be prevalent on Usenet.
- ISCII (1988)

==== Devanagari–nastaʿlīq (Hindustani) ====
Hindustani is an Indo-Aryan language with extreme digraphia and diglossia resulting from the Hindi–Urdu controversy starting in the 1800s. Technically, Hindustani itself is recognized by neither the language community nor any governments. Two standardized registers, Standard Hindi and Standard Urdu, are recognized as official languages in India and Pakistan. However, in practice the situation is,

- In Pakistan: Standard (Saaf or Khaalis) Urdu is the "high" variety, whereas Hindustani is the "low" variety used by the masses (called Urdu, written in nastaʿlīq script).
- In India, both Standard (Shuddh) Hindi and Standard (Saaf or Khaalis) Urdu are the "H" varieties (written in devanagari and nastaʿlīq respectively), whereas Hindustani is the "L" variety used by the masses and written in either devanagari or nastaʿlīq (and called 'Hindi' or 'Urdu' respectively).

The digraphia renders any work in either script largely inaccessible to users of the other script, though otherwise Hindustani is a perfectly mutually intelligible language, essentially meaning that any kind of text-based open source collaboration is impossible among devanagari and nastaʿlīq readers.

Initiated in 2011, the Hamari Boli Initiative is a full-scale open-source language planning initiative aimed at Hindustani script, style, status & lexical reform and modernization. One of primary stated objectives of Hamari Boli is to relieve Hindustani of the crippling devanagari–nastaʿlīq digraphia by way of romanization.

=== Chinese ===
Romanization of the Sinitic languages, particularly Mandarin, has proved a very difficult problem, although the issue is further complicated by political considerations. Because of this, many romanization tables contain Chinese characters plus one or more romanizations or Zhuyin.

==== Mandarin ====
- ALA-LC: Used to be similar to Wade–Giles, but converted to Hanyu Pinyin in 2000
- EFEO. Developed by École française d'Extrême-Orient in the 19th century, used mainly in France.
- Latinxua Sin Wenz (1926): Omitted tone sounds. Used mainly in the Soviet Union and Xinjiang in the 1930s. Predecessor of Hanyu Pinyin.
- Lessing-Othmer: Used mainly in Germany.
- Postal romanization (1906): Early standard for international addresses
- Wade–Giles (1892): Transliteration. Very popular from the 19th century until recently and continues to be used by some Western academics.
- Yale (1942): Created by the U.S. for battlefield communication and used in the influential Yale textbooks.
- Legge romanization: Created by James Legge, a Scottish missionary.

===== China =====
- Hanyu Pinyin (1958): In China, Hanyu Pinyin has been used officially to romanize Mandarin for decades, primarily as a linguistic tool for teaching the standardized language. The system is also used in Singapore and parts of Taiwan, and has been adopted by much of the international community as a standard for writing Chinese words and names in the Latin script. The value of Hanyu Pinyin in education in China lies in the fact that China, like any other populated area with comparable area and population, has numerous distinct dialects, though there is just one common written language and one common standardized spoken form. (These comments apply to romanization in general)
- ISO 7098 (1991): Based on Hanyu Pinyin.

===== Taiwan =====
1. Gwoyeu Romatzyh (GR, 1928–1986, in Taiwan 1945–1986; Taiwan used Japanese Romaji before 1945),
2. Mandarin Phonetic Symbols II (MPS II, 1986–2002),
3. Tongyong Pinyin (2002–2008), and
4. Hanyu Pinyin (since January 1, 2009).

==== Cantonese ====
- Barnett–Chao
- Guangdong (1960)
- Hong Kong Government
- Jyutping
- Macau Government
- Meyer–Wempe
- Sidney Lau
- Yale (1942)
- ILE romanization of Cantonese

==== Min Nan or Hokkien ====
- Pe̍h-ōe-jī (POJ), once the de facto official script of the Presbyterian Church in Taiwan (since the late 19th century). Technically this represented a largely phonemic transcription system, as Min Nan was not commonly written in Chinese.
- Tâi-uân Lô-má-jī Phing-im Hong-àn

===== Teochew =====
- Guangdong (1960), for the distinct Teochew variety.

==== Min Dong ====
- Foochow Romanized

==== Min Bei ====
- Kienning Colloquial Romanized

=== Japanese ===
Romanization (or, more generally, Roman letters) is called "rōmaji" in Japanese. The most common systems are:

- Hepburn (1867): phonetic transcription to Anglo-American practices, used in geographical names
- Nihon-shiki (1885): transliteration. Also adopted as (ISO 3602 Strict) in 1989.
- Kunrei-shiki (1937): phonemic transcription. Also adopted as (ISO 3602).
- JSL (1987): phonemic transcription. Named after the book Japanese: The Spoken Language by Eleanor Jorden.
- ALA-LC: Similar to Modified Hepburn
- Wāpuro: ("word processor romanization") transliteration. Not strictly a system, but a collection of common practices that enables input of Japanese text.

=== Korean ===
The following systems are currently the most widely used:

- McCune–Reischauer ("MR"; 1939): Basis for various romanization systems. Almost universally used by international academic journals on Korean studies.
  - Romanization of Korean (1992): The official romanization in North Korea, with some differences from the original MR.
  - The ALA-LC system is based on but deviates from MR.
  - South Korea formerly used yet another modified version of MR as its official system from 1984 to 2000.
- Revised Romanization of Korean (2000): South Korea's official romanization system.
- Yale romanization of Korean (1942): Standard for almost exclusively international linguists.

=== Thai ===
Thai, spoken in Thailand and some areas of Laos, Burma and China, is written with its own script, probably descended from mixture of Tai–Laotian and Old Khmer, in the Brahmic family.

- Royal Thai General System of Transcription
- ISO 11940 1998 Transliteration
- ISO 11940-2 2007 Transcription
- ALA-LC

=== Nuosu ===
The Nuosu language, spoken in southern China, is written with its own script, the Yi script. The only existing romanization system is YYPY (Yi Yu Pin Yin), which represents tone with letters attached to the end of syllables, as Nuosu forbids codas. It does not use diacritics, and as such due to the large phonemic inventory of Nuosu, it requires frequent use of digraphs, including for monophthong vowels.

=== Tibetan ===
The Tibetan script has two official romanization systems: Tibetan Pinyin (for Lhasa Tibetan) and Roman Dzongkha (for Dzongkha).

=== Cyrillic ===
In English language library catalogues, bibliographies, and most academic publications, the Library of Congress transliteration method is used worldwide.

In linguistics, scientific transliteration is used for both Cyrillic and Glagolitic alphabets. This applies to Old Church Slavonic, as well as modern Slavic languages that use these alphabets.

==== Belarusian ====
- BGN/PCGN romanization of Belarusian, 1979 (United States Board on Geographic Names and Permanent Committee on Geographical Names for British Official Use)
- Scientific transliteration, or the International Scholarly System for linguistics
- ALA-LC romanization, 1997 (American Library Association and Library of Congress):
- ISO 9:1995
- Instruction on transliteration of Belarusian geographical names with letters of Latin script, 2000

==== Bulgarian ====
A system based on scientific transliteration and ISO/R 9:1968 was considered official in Bulgaria since the 1970s. Since the late 1990s, Bulgarian authorities have switched to the so-called Streamlined System avoiding the use of diacritics and optimized for compatibility with English. This system became mandatory for public use with a law passed in 2009. Where the old system uses <č,š,ž,št,c,j,ă>, the new system uses <ch,sh,zh,sht,ts,y,a>.

The new Bulgarian system was endorsed for official use also by UN in 2012, and by BGN and PCGN in 2013.

==== Russian ====
There is no single universally accepted system of writing Russian using the Latin script—in fact there are a huge number of such systems: some are adjusted for a particular target language (e.g. German or French), some are designed as a librarian's transliteration, some are prescribed for Russian travellers' passports; the transcription of some names is purely traditional. All this has resulted in great reduplication of names. E.g. the name of the Russian composer Tchaikovsky may also be written as Tchaykovsky, Tchajkovskij, Tchaikowski, Tschaikowski, Czajkowski, Čajkovskij, Čajkovski, Chajkovskij, Çaykovski, Chaykovsky, Chaykovskiy, Chaikovski, Tshaikovski, Tšaikovski, Tsjajkovskij etc. Systems include:

- BGN/PCGN (1947): Transliteration system (United States Board on Geographic Names & Permanent Committee on Geographical Names for British Official Use).
- GOST 16876-71 (1971): A now defunct Soviet transliteration standard. Replaced by GOST 7.79, which is an ISO 9 equivalent.
- United Nations romanization system for geographical names (1987): Based on GOST 16876-71.
- ISO 9 (1995): Transliteration. From the International Organization for Standardization.
- ALA-LC (1997)
- "Volapuk" encoding (1990s): Slang term (it is not really Volapük) for a writing method that is not truly a transliteration, but used for similar goals (see article).
- Conventional English transliteration is based to BGN/PCGN, but does not follow a particular standard. Described in detail at Romanization of Russian.
- Streamlined System for the romanization of Russian.
- Comparative transliteration of Russian in different languages (Western European, Arabic, Georgian, Braille, Morse)

==== Syriac ====
The Latin script for Syriac was developed in the 1930s, following the state policy for minority languages of the Soviet Union, with some material published.

==== Ukrainian ====
The 2010 Ukrainian National system has been adopted by the UNGEGN in 2012 and by the BGN/PCGN in 2020. It is also very close to the modified (simplified) ALA-LC system, which has remained unchanged since 1941.

- ALA-LC
- ISO 9
- Ukrainian National transliteration
- Ukrainian National and BGN/PCGN systems, at the UN Working Group on Romanization Systems
- Thomas T. Pedersen's comparison of five systems

== Overview and summary ==
The chart below shows the most common phonemic transcription romanization used for several different alphabets. While it is sufficient for many casual users, there are multiple alternatives used for each alphabet, and many exceptions. For details, consult each of the language sections above. (Hangul characters are broken down into jamo components.)

Romanized	IPA	Greek	Cyrillic	Amazigh	Hebrew	Arabic	Persian	Katakana	Hangul	Bopomofo
A	a	A	А	ⴰ	ַ, ֲ, ָ	َ, ا	ا, آ	ア	ㅏ	ㄚ
AE	ai̯/ɛ	ΑΙ							ㅐ	
AI	ai				י ַ					ㄞ
B	b	ΜΠ, Β	Б	ⴱ	בּ	ﺏ ﺑ ﺒ ﺐ	ﺏ ﺑ		ㅂ	ㄅ
C	k/s	Ξ								ㄘ
CH	ʧ	TΣ̈	Ч		צ׳		چ		ㅊ	ㄔ
CHI	ʨi							チ		
D	d	ΝΤ, Δ	Д	ⴷ, ⴹ	ד	ﺩ — ﺪ, ﺽ ﺿ ﻀ ﺾ	د		ㄷ	ㄉ
DH	ð	Δ			דֿ	ﺫ — ﺬ				
DZ	ʣ	ΤΖ	Ѕ							
E	e/ɛ	Ε, ΑΙ	Э	ⴻ	, ֱ, י ֵֶ, ֵ, י ֶ			エ	ㅔ	ㄟ
EO	ʌ								ㅓ	
EU	ɯ								ㅡ	
F	f	Φ	Ф	ⴼ	פ (or its final form ף )	ﻑ ﻓ ﻔ ﻒ	ﻑ			ㄈ
FU	ɸɯ							フ		
G	ɡ	ΓΓ, ΓΚ, Γ	Г	ⴳ, ⴳⵯ	ג		گ		ㄱ	ㄍ
GH	ɣ	Γ	Ғ	ⵖ	גֿ, עֿ	ﻍ ﻏ ﻐ ﻎ	ق غ			
H	h	Η	Һ	ⵀ, ⵃ	ח, ה	ﻩ ﻫ ﻬ ﻪ, ﺡ ﺣ ﺤ ﺢ	ه ح ﻫ		ㅎ	ㄏ
HA	ha							ハ		
HE	he							ヘ		
HI	hi							ヒ		
HO	ho							ホ		
I	i/ɪ	Η, Ι, Υ, ΕΙ, ΟΙ	И, І	ⵉ	ִ, י ִ	دِ		イ	ㅣ	ㄧ
IY	ij					دِي				
J	ʤ	TZ̈	ДЖ, Џ	ⵊ	ג׳	ﺝ ﺟ ﺠ ﺞ	ج		ㅈ	ㄐ
JJ	ʦ͈/ʨ͈								ㅉ	
K	k	Κ	К	ⴽ, ⴽⵯ	כּ	ﻙ ﻛ ﻜ ﻚ	ک		ㅋ	ㄎ
KA	ka							カ		
KE	ke							ケ		
KH	x	X	Х	ⵅ	כ, חֿ (or its final form ך )	ﺥ ﺧ ﺨ ﺦ	خ			
KI	ki							キ		
KK	k͈								ㄲ	
KO	ko							コ		
KU	kɯ							ク		
L	l	Λ	Л	ⵍ	ל	ﻝ ﻟ ﻠ ﻞ	ل		ㄹ	ㄌ
M	m	Μ	М	ⵎ	מ (or its final form ם )	ﻡ ﻣ ﻤ ﻢ	م		ㅁ	ㄇ
MA	ma							マ		
ME	me							メ		
MI	mi							ミ		
MO	mo							モ		
MU	mɯ							ム		
N	n	Ν	Н	ⵏ	נ (or its final form ן )	ﻥ ﻧ ﻨ ﻦ	ن	ン	ㄴ	ㄋ
NA	na							ナ		
NE	ne							ネ		
NG	ŋ								ㅇ	
NI	ɲi							ニ		
NO	no							ノ		
NU	nɯ							ヌ		
O	o	Ο, Ω	О		, ֳ, וֹֹ		ُا	オ	ㅗ	
OE	ø								ㅚ	
P	p	Π	П		פּ		پ		ㅍ	ㄆ
PP	p͈								ㅃ	
PS	ps	Ψ								
Q	q	Θ		ⵇ	ק	ﻕ ﻗ ﻘ ﻖ	غ ق			ㄑ
R	r	Ρ	Р	ⵔ, ⵕ	ר	ﺭ — ﺮ	ر		ㄹ	ㄖ
RA	ɾa							ラ		
RE	ɾe							レ		
RI	ɾi							リ		
RO	ɾo							ロ		
RU	ɾɯ							ル		
S	s	Σ	С	ⵙ, ⵚ	ס, שׂ	ﺱ ﺳ ﺴ ﺲ, ﺹ ﺻ ﺼ ﺺ	س ث ص		ㅅ	ㄙ
SA	sa							サ		
SE	se							セ		
SH	ʃ	Σ̈	Ш	ⵛ	שׁ	ﺵ ﺷ ﺸ ﺶ	ش			ㄕ
SHCH	ʃʧ		Щ							
SHI	ɕi							シ		
SO	so							ソ		
SS	s͈								ㅆ	
SU	sɯ							ス		
T	t	Τ	Т	ⵜ, ⵟ	ט, תּ, ת	ﺕ ﺗ ﺘ ﺖ, ﻁ ﻃ ﻄ ﻂ	ت ط		ㅌ	ㄊ
TA	ta							タ		
TE	te							テ		
TH	θ	Θ			תֿ	ﺙ ﺛ ﺜ ﺚ				
TO	to							ト		
TS	ʦ	ΤΣ	Ц		צ (or its final form ץ )					
TSU	ʦɯ							ツ		
TT	t͈								ㄸ	
U	u	ΟΥ, Υ	У	ⵓ	, וֻּ	دُ		ウ	ㅜ	ㄩ
UI	ɰi								ㅢ	
UW	uw					دُو				
V	v	B	В		ב		و			
W	w	Ω		ⵡ	ו, וו	ﻭ — ﻮ				
WA	wa							ワ	ㅘ	
WAE	wɛ								ㅙ	
WE	we							ヱ	ㅞ	
WI	y/ɥi							ヰ	ㅟ	
WO	wo							ヲ	ㅝ	
X	x/ks	Ξ, Χ								ㄒ
Y	j	Υ, Ι, ΓΙ	Й, Ы, Ј	ⵢ	י	ﻱ ﻳ ﻴ ﻲ	ی			
YA	ja		Я					ヤ	ㅑ	
YAE	jɛ								ㅒ	
YE	je		Е, Є						ㅖ	
YEO	jʌ								ㅕ	
YI	ji		Ї							
YO	jo		Ё					ヨ	ㅛ	
YU	ju		Ю					ユ	ㅠ	
Z	z	Ζ	З	ⵣ, ⵥ	ז	ﺯ — ﺰ, ﻅ ﻇ ﻈ ﻆ	ز ظ ذ ض			ㄗ
ZH	ʐ/ʒ	Ζ̈	Ж		ז׳		ژ			ㄓ

== See also ==
- Anglicisation
- Cyrillization, expression of a language in Cyrillic letters
- Francization
- Gairaigo
- Transcription into Chinese, though standards vary by polity.
- Sinicization, specifically adoption of Chinese literary culture
- Latinisation of names
- Semitic romanization
- Spread of the Latin script
