= Cantonese Transliteration Scheme =

Romanization scheme for Cantonese

The Cantonese Transliteration Scheme (simplified Chinese: 广州话拼音方案; traditional Chinese: 廣州話拼音方案; pinyin: Guǎngzhōuhuà Pīnyīn Fāng'àn), sometimes called Rao's romanization, is the romanisation for Cantonese published at part of the Guangdong Romanization by the Guangdong Education department in 1960, and further revised by Rao Bingcai in 1980. It is referred to as the Canton Romanization on the LSHK character database.

The system is not used in Hong Kong where romanization schemes such as Hong Kong Government, Yale, ILE, and Jyutping are popular, though it can be seen in works released in the People's Republic of China regarding Cantonese. Some of the non-professional Guangzhou-language tutorials and dictionaries currently published in mainland China also use this scheme.

== Contents ==
=== Alphabet ===
Alphabet
Letter	a	b	c	d	e	f	g	h	i	j	k	l	m	n	o	p	q	r	s	t	u	v	w	x	y	z

- The letters r and v are only used in Mandarin or loanwords.
- There are three additional letters: ê, é, ü. É is different from its value in Pinyin. These letters are variants of the e and u letters and are not included in the table.
- In the original 1960 version, there was an additional letter: ô, a variant of o. This letter was abolished in the 1980 revised version.

=== Initials ===
b /p/	p /pʰ/	m /m/	f /f/
d /t/	t /tʰ/	n /n/	l /l/
g /k/	k /kʰ/	ng /ŋ/	h /h/
z /ts/	c /tsʰ/	s /s/	
j /tɕ/	q /tɕʰ/	x /ɕ/	
		y /j/	w /w/

Unlike the other Cantonese romanization schemes, Guangdong romanization indicates a difference between the alveolar consonants z, c, s and the alveolo-palatal consonants j, q, x. Cantonese typically does not differentiate these two types of consonants because they are allophones that occur in complementary distributions. However, speech patterns of most Cantonese speakers do utilize both types of consonants and the romanization scheme attempts to reflect this.

- z, c, and s are used before finals beginning with a, e, o, u, ê, and é.
- j, q, and x are used before finals beginning with i and ü.

Some publications may not bother with this distinction and will choose just one set or the other to represent these consonants.

=== Finals ===
Finals consist of an optional medial and an obligatory rime.

==== Medials ====
The only recognized medial glide in the Cantonese Guangdong romanization is u, which occurs in syllables with initials g or k and rimes that begin with a, e, i, or o. In other romanization schemes, this medial is usually grouped along with the initial as gw and kw, but Guangdong romanization attempts to preserve it as a medial. For simplicity, the u is sometimes grouped with the initials anyway as gu and ku.

The u medial can occur without an initial, but in that case it is considered the same as the initial w. The same is true for the medial i, which is only recognized as the initial y.

==== Rimes ====
a /aː/	ai /aːi/	ao /aːu/	am /aːm/	an /aːn/	ang /aːŋ/	ab /aːp/	ad /aːt/	ag /aːk/
	ei /ɐi/	eo /ɐu/	em /ɐm/	en /ɐn/	eng /ɐŋ/	eb /ɐp/	ed /ɐt/	eg /ɐk/
é /ɛː/	éi /ei/				éng /ɛːŋ/			ég /ɛːk/
i /iː/		iu /iːu/	im /iːm/	in /iːn/	ing /eŋ/	ib /iːp/	id /iːt/	ig /ek/
o /ɔː/	oi /ɔːi/	ou /ou/		on /ɔːn/	ong /ɔːŋ/		od /ɔːt/	og /ɔːk/
u /uː/	ui /uːi/			un /uːn/	ung /oŋ/		ud /uːt/	ug /ok/
ê /œː/	êu /ɵy/			ên /ɵn/	êng /œːŋ/		êd /ɵt/	êg /œːk/
ü /yː/				ün /yːn/			üd /yːt/	
			m /m̩/		ng /ŋ̩/			

- When i begins a rime in a syllable that has no initial, y is used as the initial.
- When u begins a rime in a syllable that has no initial, w is used as the initial.
- When ü begins a rime in a syllable that has no initial, y is used as the initial and the umlaut is omitted.
- When ü begins a rime in a syllable with initial j, q, or x, the umlaut is omitted.
- The rime êu may be also written as êü (with the umlaut over the u), in accord with its pronunciation.
- The rimes m and ng can only be used as standalone nasal syllables.
- In the original 1960 version, eo was spelled as ou, and e-line was not uniform.
- In the original 1960 version, ou was spelled as a, and the rimes of the line were not uniform.
- In the original 1960 version, ong was spelled as "ng," and the rimes of the line were not uniform.
- In the original 1960 version, ung was spelled as ong, and the u line was not uniform.

=== Tones ===
There are nine tones in six distinct tone contours in Cantonese. In Guangdong Romanization, one may represent the entering (入 rù) tones either together with tones 1, 3, and 6, as in the other Cantonese romanization schemes, or separately as tones 7, 8, and 9. Syllables with entering tones correspond to those ending in -b, -d, or -g.

Tone name	Yīn Píng (陰平)	Yīn Shàng (陰上)	Yīn Qù (陰去)	Yáng Píng (陽平)	Yáng Shàng (陽上)	Yáng Qù (陽去)	Yīn Rù (陰入)	Zhōng Rù (中入)	Yáng Rù (陽入)
Tone name in English	high level or high falling	mid rising	mid level	low falling	low rising	low level	entering high level	entering mid level	entering low level
Contour	55 / 53	35	33	21 / 11	13	22	5	3	2
Number	1	2	3	4	5	6	1 (7)	3 (8)	6 (9)
Simplified tone markers	|(or no marker)	/	-	\	=	_	|' or '	-'	_'
Character Example	分	粉	訓	焚	奮	份	忽	發	佛
Example	fen^{1}	fen^{2}	fen^{3}	fen^{4}	fen^{5}	fen^{6}	fed^{1}	fad^{3}	fed^{6}
Example with simplified tone markers	fen| or fen	fen/	fen-	fen\	fen=	fen_	fed|' or fed'	fad-'	fed_'

=== Examples ===
Traditional	Simplified	Romanization	Jyutping
廣州話	广州话	guong^{2} zeo^{1} wa^{2}	gwong^{2} zau^{1} waa^{6}
粵語	粤语	yud^{6} (or yud^{9}) yu^{5}	jyut^{6} jyu^{5}
你好	你好	néi^{5} hou^{2}	nei^{5} hou^{2}

Sample transcription of one of the 300 Tang Poems by Meng Haoran:

春曉	Cên1 Hiu2
孟浩然	Mang6 Hou6yin4
春眠不覺曉，	Cên1 min4 bed1 gog3 hiu2,
處處聞啼鳥。	qu3 qu3 men4 tei4 niu5.
夜來風雨聲，	Yé6 loi4 fung1 yu5 xing1,
花落知多少？	fa1 log6 ji1 do1 xiu2?

== See also ==
- Guangdong Romanization
