= Standard Romanization =

Standard Romanization is a system of romanisation for Cantonese developed by Christian missionaries in southern China in 1888, particularly relying upon the work of John Morrison Chalmers. By 1914, it had become well established in Canton (Guangzhou) and Hong Kong (there being no other system of significance in published literature, and publications using it having been issued by the British and Foreign Bible Society, the China Baptist Publication Society, and the Pakhoi Mission Press from as early as 1906). It is the foundation of the current system of romanisation used by the Hong Kong Government.

== Initials ==
p [p]	p‘ [pʰ]	f [f]	m [m]
t [t]	t‘ [tʰ]		n [n]
ts [ts]	ts‘ [tsʰ]	s [s]	l [l]
ch [tɕ]	ch‘ [tɕʰ]	sh [ɕ]	y [j]
k [k]	k‘ [kʰ]	h [h]	ng [ŋ]
kw [kw]	kw‘ [kʰw]		w [w]

Note that the following initials are left unspelt: [j] preceding i(m/n/p/t/u) or ue(n/t), [w] preceding oo(i/n/t), and zero-initial (which only occurs preceding finals other than these just-mentioned ones where the accompanying [j] or [w] is not written).

== Finals ==
a [aː]	aai [aːi]	aau [aːu]	aam [aːm]	aan [aːn]	aang [aːŋ]	aap [aːp̚]	aat [aːt̚]	aak [aːk̚]
	ai [ɐi]	au [ɐu]	am [ɐm]	an [ɐn]	ang [ɐŋ]	ap [ɐp̚]	at [ɐt̚]	ak [ɐk̚]
e [ɛː]	ei [ei]				eng [ɛːŋ]			ek [ɛːk̚]
i [iː]		iu [iːu]	im [iːm]	in [iːn]	ing [eŋ]	ip [iːp̚]	it [iːt̚]	ik [ek̚]
oh [ɔː]	oi [ɔːj]	o [ou]	om [om]	on [ɔːn]	ong [ɔːŋ]	op [op̚]	ot [ɔːt̚]	ok [ɔːk̚]
oo [uː]	ooi [uːj]			oon [uːn]	ung [oŋ]		oot [uːt̚]	uk [ok̚]
eu [œː]	ui [ɵy]			un [ɵn]	eung [œːŋ]		ut [ɵt̚]	euk [œːk̚]
ue [yː]				uen [yːn]			uet [yːt̚]	
z [ɨː]			m [m̩]		ng [ŋ̍]			

- The finals m and ng can only be used as stand-alone nasal syllables.
- The finals om and op occur only with the initials k and h. (And these finals are now pronounced differently from am and ap by just a conservative minority of speakers, who consequently have for example 柑 kom ‘mandarin orange’ distinct from 金 kam ‘gold’.)
- Only when ts, ts‘, or s is the initial can z occur as the final, and these initials are among the ones with which i as final does not occur (these two circumstances together meaning that a complementary distribution exists between the two finals).
- When [j] is the initial, and i, im, in, ip, it, or iu is used with it as the final, the spelling does not bother to write an initial y (because zero-initial preceding these finals does not occur), which results in the spellings being merely i, im, in, ip, it, and iu; however, in yik and ying, the y is nonetheless redundantly written.
- When [j] is the initial, and ue, uen, or uet is the final, the y is for the same reason omitted.
- When [w] is the initial, and oo, ooi, oon, or oot is the final, the w is in parallel omitted.
- Unlike most modern systems of Cantonese romanization, a distinction is made between two series of sibilants, which means there is still a difference between for example 卅 and 沙, the former being represented by sa while the latter is written as sha.

== Tones ==
Tones are indicated using diacritic marks.

Note: In the following table, “x” stands for whatever letter bears any tonal diacritic, that letter being the syllable’s final vowel or (if no vowel is present, then) its final letter (in the major dictionary of 1965 by Cowles).

Standard Romanization	Yale equivalent	tone-numbers standard in Chinese linguistics	IPA & Chao tone-numbers	Jyutping tone-numbers
x{m,n,ng,u,i,nothing}	x̀{m,n,ng,u,i,nothing}	1	˥˨ 52	1
x̄{m,n,ng,u,i,nothing}	x̀{hm,hn,hng,uh,ih,h}	2	˨˩ 21	4
x́{m,n,ng,u,i,nothing}	x́{m,n,ng,u,i,nothing}	3	˧˥ 35	2
x̆{m,n,ng,u,i,nothing}	x́{hm,hn,hng,uh,ih,h}	4	˨˧ 23	5
x̀{m,n,ng,u,i,nothing}	x{m,n,ng,u,i,nothing}	5	˧ 33	3
x̂{m,n,ng,u,i,nothing}	x{hm,hn,hng,uh,ih,h}	6	˨ 22	6
x{p,t,k}	x̄{p,t,k}	7	˥ 55	7 (1)
x̄{p,t,k}	x{hp,ht,hk}	8	˨ 22	9 (6)
x̊{p,t,k}	x{p,t,k}	9	˧ 33	8 (3)

Examples
Traditional	Simplified	Romanization
廣州	广州	kwóng-chau
粵語	粤语	uēt-uĕ
你好	你好	neĭ hó
