= Macau Government Cantonese Romanization =

The Macau Government Cantonese Romanization (Portuguese: Romanização Cantonesa do Governo de Macau; Chinese: 澳門政府粵語拼音) refers to the mostly consistent system for romanizing Cantonese as employed by the Government of Macau and other non-governmental organizations based in Macau. The system has been employed by the Macau Government since the Portuguese colonial period and continues to be used after the 1999 handover of the territory. Similarly to its counterpart romanization system in Hong Kong, the method is not completely standardized and thus is not taught in schools, but rather employed by government agencies to accurately display the correct pronunciation of Cantonese in public signage and official usage.

The Macau Government romanization of Cantonese uses a similar convention to that of the Hong Kong Government's but is based on Portuguese pronunciation rather than English, given the colonial history of Macau. Therefore, the two governmental standards have differing orthographies for the same Cantonese pronunciation; for instance, the place name known as 石排灣 in Chinese is romanized as Seac Pai Van in Macau but as Shek Pai Wan in Hong Kong.

== Usage ==
For most of Macau's colonial history, the Portuguese government lacked a consistent way of romanizing Cantonese into Portuguese but adopted a de facto standard for transliterating proper names such as geographical locations and surnames. The 1985 publication of the Silabário Codificado de Romanização do Cantonense created a phonetic table and tonal chart of Cantonese based on Portuguese phonology and afterwards became the basis for Cantonese to Portuguese romanization. Prior to this adoption, individuals who studied or conducted business frequently in nearby British Hong Kong would have a tendency to adopt an English-based Hong Kong transliteration for romanizing Cantonese.

== Orthography ==
While the system is not officially standardized, the Macau Government romanization system more or less follows consistent patterns and uses the Portuguese alphabet as its basis. This results in the substitution of letters found in other Cantonese romanization methods for their closest Portuguese equivalents, such as the letter 'v' for 'w' (/w/). As with the system used by the Hong Kong Government, all tones and distinctions between long and short vowels are omitted.

=== Consanants ===
Initials

| IPA | Macau gov. | Jyutping | Yale | HKG |
|---|---|---|---|---|
| pʰ | p | p | p | p |
| p | p | b | b | p |
| tʰ | t | t | t | t |
| t | t | d | d | t |
| kʰ | k | k | k | k |
| k | k | g | g | k |
| kʰw | ku | kw | kw | kw |
| kw | ku | gw | gw | kw |
| m | m | m | m | m |
| n | n | n | n | n |
| ŋ | ng | ng | ng | ng |
| l | l | l | l | l |
| f | f | f | f | f |
| s | s | s | s | s, sh |
| h | h | h | h | h |
| j | i | j | y | y |
| w | v, w* | w | w | w |
| tsʰ | ch | c | ch | ch, ts |
| ts | ch | z | j | ch, ts |

Finals

| IPA | Macau gov. | Jyutping | Yale | HKG |
|---|---|---|---|---|
| -p | -p | -p | -p | -p |
| -t | -t | -t | -t | -t |
| -k | -c, -k* | -k | -k | -k |
| -m | -m | -m | -m | -m |
| -n | -n | -n | -n | -n |
| -ŋ | -ng | -ng | -ng | -ng |

Note: *Denotes non-governmental standard but may be used as an alternative

=== Vowels, diphthongs, and syllabic consonants ===
| IPA | Macau gov. | Jyutping | Yale | HKG |
|---|---|---|---|---|
| aː | a, ah | aa | aa | a, ah |
| ɐ | e | a | a | a, o, u |
| ɛː/e | e | e | e | e |
| iː | i | i | i | i, ze, ee |
| o | o, e | o | o | o |
| uː | u | u | u | u, oo |
| œː | eu | oe | eu | eu, eo |
| ɵ | eu | eo | eu | u |
| yː | iu | yu | yu | yu, u, ue |
| aːj | ai | aai | aai | ai |
| ɐj | ai | ai | ai | ai |
| aːw | ao | aau | aau | au |
| ɐw | ao | au | au | au |
| ej | ei | ei | ei | ei, ee, ay, ai, i |
| iːw | io | iu | iu | iu |
| ɔːj | oi | oi | oi | oi, oy |
| uːj | ui | ui | ui | ui |
| ɵj | oi | eoi | eui | ui |
| ow | ou | ou | ou | o |
| m̩ | m | m | m | |
| ŋ̍ | ng | ng | ng | ng |
