= Cantonese =

Prestige variety of Yue Chinese

- Standard Cantonese
- 廣東話 / Gwóngdūngwá 廣州話 / Gwóngjāuwá
- Gwóngdūng wá written in traditional Chinese (left) and simplified Chinese (right) characters
- Native to: China, Hong Kong, Macau, and overseas Chinese communities
- Region: Guangdong, eastern Guangxi
- Language family: Sino-Tibetan: Sinitic; Chinese; Yue; Yuehai; Cantonese
- Early forms: Proto-Sino-Tibetan: Old Chinese; Eastern Han Chinese; Middle Chinese
- Dialects: Hong Kong; Malaysian; Boat Dweller; Wuzhou; Xiguan
- Writing system: Chinese Characters; Written Cantonese; Cantonese Braille; Transcriptions Jyutping; Yale Romanisation; Cantonese Transliteration Scheme

Official status
- Official language in: Hong Kong (Note: De facto spoken language—while no specific variety of Chinese is official in Hong Kong, Cantonese is the predominant spoken form and the de facto regional spoken standard. The Hong Kong government promotes trilingualism between Cantonese, Mandarin, and English, especially in public education.); Macau (Note: De facto spoken language—while no specific variety of Chinese is official in Macau, Cantonese is the predominant spoken form and the de facto regional spoken standard. The Macau government promotes each of Cantonese, Mandarin, Portuguese, and English, especially in public education.)
- Regulated by: Hong Kong: Education Bureau; Macau: Education and Youth Development Bureau

Language codes
- ISO 639-3: yue (superset for all Yue dialects)
- Glottolog: cant1236
- Linguasphere: 79-AAA-ma
- Guangdong, Hong Kong, and Macau 500k+ Cantonese speaking peoples 100k+ or >10% of population made of Cantonese speaking peoples 50k+ Cantonese speaking peoples 30k+ or an insignificant provincial amount within a country with a significant amount of Cantonese speakers

Cantonese
- Traditional Chinese: 廣東話
- Simplified Chinese: 广东话
Transcriptions
Standard Mandarin
- Hanyu Pinyin: Guǎngdōnghuà
- Bopomofo: ㄍㄨㄤˇ ㄉㄨㄥ ㄏㄨㄚˋ
- Wade–Giles: Kuang^{3}-tung^{1}-hua^{4}
- Tongyong Pinyin: Guǎngdong-huà
- IPA: [kwàŋ.tʊ́ŋ.xwâ]
Yue: Cantonese
- Yale Romanization: Gwóngdūngwá
- Jyutping: Gwong2 dung1 waa2
- IPA: [kʷɔŋ˧˥ tʊŋ˥ wa˧˥]

'Canton speech' or 'Guangzhou speech'
- Traditional Chinese: 廣州話
- Simplified Chinese: 广州话
Transcriptions
Standard Mandarin
- Hanyu Pinyin: Guǎngzhōuhuà
- Bopomofo: ㄍㄨㄤˇ ㄓㄡ ㄏㄨㄚˋ
- Wade–Giles: Kuang^{3}-chou^{1}-hua^{4}
- Tongyong Pinyin: Guǎngjhou-huà
- IPA: [kwàŋ.ʈʂóʊ.xwâ]
Yue: Cantonese
- Yale Romanization: Gwóngjāuwá
- Jyutping: Gwong2 zau1 waa2
- IPA: [kʷɔŋ˧˥.tsɐw˥ wa˧˥]

Cantonese is the traditional prestige variety of Yue Chinese, a Sinitic language belonging to the Sino-Tibetan language family. It originated in the city of Guangzhou (formerly romanized as Canton) and its surrounding Pearl River Delta. Although Cantonese specifically refers to the prestige variety in linguistics, the term is often used more broadly to describe the entire Yue subgroup of Chinese, including varieties such as Taishanese, which have limited mutual intelligibility with Cantonese.

Cantonese is viewed as a vital and inseparable part of the cultural identity for its native speakers across large swaths of southeastern China, Hong Kong, and Macau, as well as in overseas communities. In mainland China, it is the lingua franca of the province of Guangdong (being the majority language of the Pearl River Delta) and neighbouring areas such as Guangxi. It is also the dominant and co-official language of Hong Kong and Macau. Further, Cantonese is widely spoken among overseas Chinese in Southeast Asia (most notably in Vietnam and Malaysia, as well as in Singapore and Cambodia to a lesser extent) and the Western world. With about 80 million total speakers as of 2023, standard Cantonese is by far the most spoken variant of Yue Chinese and non-Mandarin Chinese language.

Although Cantonese shares much vocabulary with Mandarin and other varieties of Chinese, these Sinitic languages have very limited to no mutual intelligibility, largely because of phonological differences, but also differences in grammar and vocabulary. Sentence structure, in particular the verb placement, sometimes differs between the two varieties. A notable difference between Cantonese and Mandarin is how the spoken word is written; both can be recorded verbatim, but very few Cantonese speakers are knowledgeable in the full Cantonese written vocabulary, so a non-verbatim formalized written form is adopted, which is more akin to the written Standard Mandarin. However, it is only non-verbatim with respect to vernacular Cantonese as it is possible to read Standard Chinese text verbatim in formal Cantonese, often with only slight changes in lexicon that are optional depending on the reader's choice of register. This results in a situation in which a Cantonese and a Mandarin text may look similar but are pronounced differently. Conversely, written (vernacular) Cantonese is mostly used in informal settings like social media and comic books.

== Names of Cantonese ==
In English, the term "Cantonese" can be ambiguous. "Cantonese" as used to refer to the language native to the city of Canton, which is the traditional English name of Guangzhou, was popularized by An English and Cantonese Pocket Dictionary (1859), a bestseller by the missionary John Chalmers. Before 1859, this variant was often referred to in English as "the Canton dialect".

However, "Cantonese" may also refer to the primary branch of Chinese that contains Cantonese proper as well as Taishanese and Gaoyang; this broader usage may be specified as "Yue speech" (粵語; 粤语; Jyut6 jyu5; Yuhtyúh). In this article, "Cantonese" is used for Cantonese proper (Guangzhou).

Historically, speakers called this variety "Guangzhou speech" (廣州話; 广州话; Gwong2 zau1 waa2; Gwóngjāu wá), although this term is now seldom used outside mainland China. In Guangdong and Guangxi, people also call it "provincial capital speech" (省城話; 省城话; Saang2 seng4 waa2; Sáangsèhng wá) or "plain speech" (白話; 白话; Baak6 waa2; Baahkwá). In academic linguistic circles, it is also referred to as "Guangzhou prefecture speech" (廣府話; 广府话; Gwong2 fu2 waa2; Gwóngfú wá).

In Hong Kong and Macau, as well as among overseas Chinese communities, the language is referred to as "Guangdong speech" or "Canton Province Speech" (廣東話; 广东话; Gwong2 dung1 waa2; Gwóngdūng wá) or simply as "Chinese" (中文; Zung1 man2; Jūngmán).

== History ==
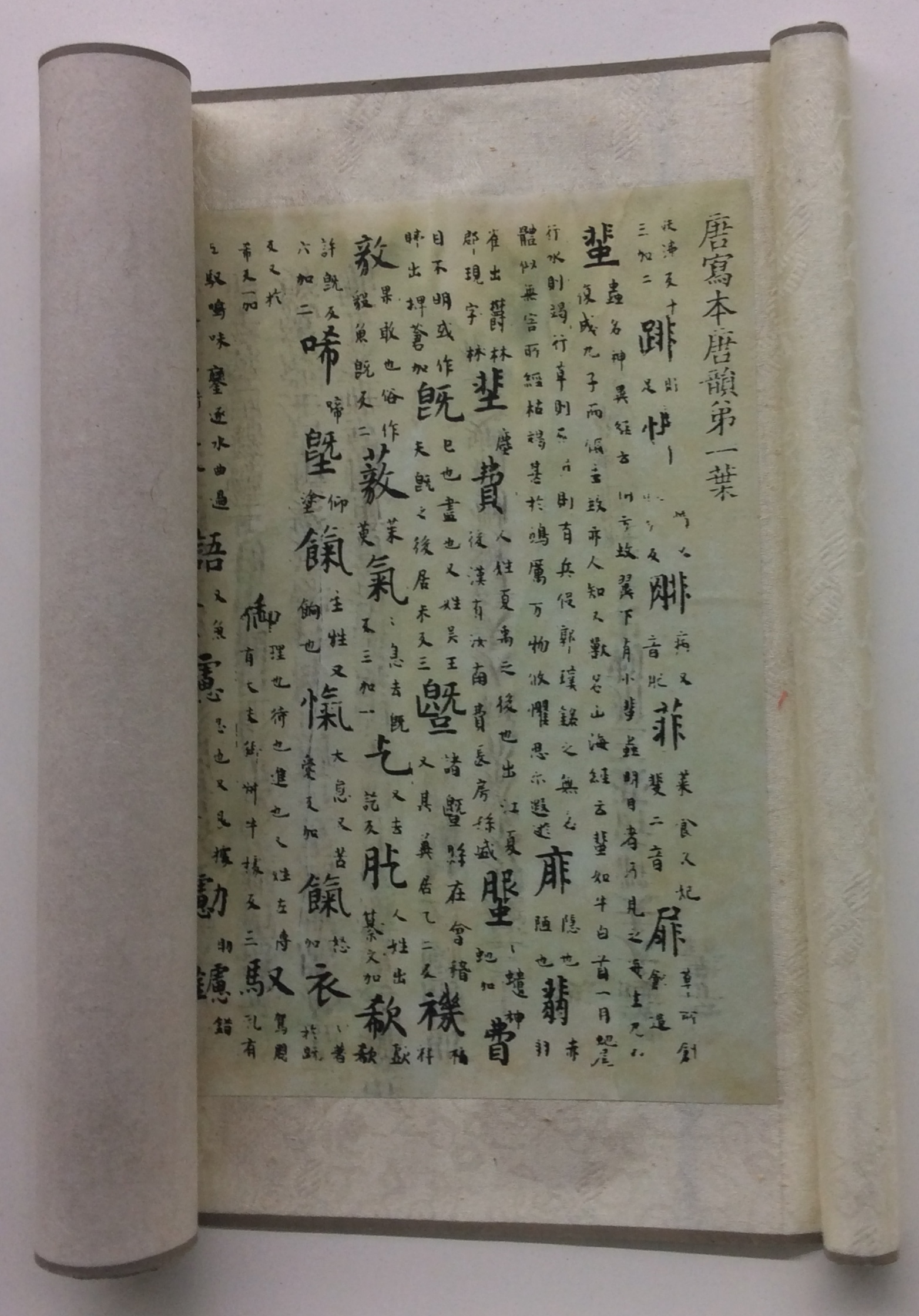
Chinese dictionary from the Tang dynasty. Modern Cantonese pronunciation preserves almost all terminal consonants (-m, -n, -ng, -p, -t, -k) from Middle Chinese.

During the Southern Song period, Guangzhou became the cultural center of the region. Cantonese emerged as the prestige variety of Yue Chinese when the port city of Guangzhou on the Pearl River Delta became the largest port in China, with a trade network stretching as far as Arabia. Specifically, the mutually intelligible speech of the Sam Yap (三邑), the Three Counties of Guangzhou, namely the historical counties of Panyu (番禺), Nanhai (南海), and Shunde (顺德), came to be heralded as the standard. Cantonese was also used in the popular Yuè'ōu, Mùyú and Nányīn folksong genres, as well as Cantonese opera. Additionally, a distinct classical literature was developed in Cantonese, with Middle Chinese texts sounding more similar to modern Cantonese than other present-day Chinese varieties, including Mandarin.

As Guangzhou became China's key commercial center for foreign trade and exchange in the 1700s, Cantonese became the variety of Chinese interacting most with the Western world. Much of the sources for this period of early Cantonese, such as the 18th century rime dictionary Fenyun Cuoyao (Chinese: 分韻撮要; pinyin: Fēnyùn Cuòyào; Cantonese Yale: Fān Wáhn Chyutyiu) and the 1828 Vocabulary of the Canton Dialect by the missionary Robert Morrison, were written in Guangzhou during this period.

After the First Opium War, centuries of maritime prohibitions ended. Large numbers of Cantonese people from the Pearl River Delta, especially merchants, subsequently migrated by boat to other parts of Guangdong and Guangxi. These migrants established enclaves of Cantonese in areas that primarily spoke other forms of Yue or even non-Sinitic languages such as Zhuang, as with the case of the Yong–Xun Yue dialect of Nanning. Many Cantonese migrants sailed also overseas, bringing the Cantonese language with them to Southeast Asia, North and South America, and Western Europe. Such enclaves of Cantonese are still found in Chinatowns across many of these major cities outside China. During the late 19th century, the pedagogical work Cantonese made easy, written by James Dyer Ball in 1883, articulated the provenance of the prestige accent of Cantonese: that of the district of Xiguan (simplified Chinese: 西关; traditional Chinese: 西關; Jyutping: Sai1 Gwaan1; Cantonese Yale: Sāigwāan) in the west of Guangzhou. It is known for its distinctive use of an apical vowel (/ɿ/, or in more conventional IPA: /ź̩~ɯ~ɨ/) in some cases where modern Cantonese would use a /i/ final.

Throughout the 19th century and continuing into the 20th century, the ancestors of most of the population of Hong Kong and Macau arrived from Guangzhou and surrounding areas after they were ceded to Britain and Portugal, respectively. The influx of such migrants into Hong Kong established Cantonese as the main language of the colony, supplanting local Yue Chinese varieties, which were closer to the dialects of neighboring Shenzhen and Dongguan, as well as the Hakka and Southern Min varieties of the region. With subsequent waves of migration into Hong Kong, even as late as the 1950s, the proportion of native Cantonese speakers in Hong Kong had not yet surpassed 50%; nonetheless, this figure has risen to above 90% since the 1970s. On the other hand, the indigenous variety of Yue Chinese in Macau had been close to that of Zhongshan, and this has had an effect on the tonal phonology of the Cantonese spoken in Macau.

As a significant proportion of the entertainment industry in China migrated to Hong Kong in the early decades of the 20th century, the Hong Kong-based entertainment industry underwent a transformation to suit overseas as well as domestic audiences. With the bifurcation of the film industry into Cantonese and Mandarin, the use of the Xiguan accent of Guangzhou as a conservative prestige accent of standard Cantonese was maintained in mass media, with films from the 1930s making prominent use of it. However, during this time many phonological changes can be detected, indicating the change from Early Cantonese to Modern Cantonese.

In mainland China, Standard Mandarin has been heavily promoted as the medium of instruction in schools and as the official language, especially after the communist takeover in 1949. Meanwhile, Cantonese has remained the official variety of Chinese in Hong Kong and Macau, both during and after the colonial period, under the policy of 'biliteracy and trilingualism' (Chinese: 兩文三語; pinyin: liǎngwén sānyǔ; Jyutping: loeng3 man4 saam1 jyu5). Government and law still function predominantly in Cantonese in these jurisdictions, and officials speak Cantonese even at the most formal occasions.

== Geographic distribution ==
=== Hong Kong and Macau ===
The official languages of Hong Kong are Chinese and English, as defined in the Hong Kong Basic Law. The Chinese language has many different varieties, of which Cantonese is one. Given the traditional predominance of Cantonese within Hong Kong, it is the de facto official spoken form of the Chinese language used in the Hong Kong Government and all courts and tribunals. It is also used as the medium of instruction in schools, alongside English.

A similar situation also exists in neighbouring Macau, where Chinese is an official language alongside Portuguese. As in Hong Kong, Cantonese is the predominant spoken variety of Chinese used in everyday life and is thus the official form of Chinese used in the government. The Cantonese spoken in Hong Kong and Macau is mutually intelligible with the Cantonese spoken in the mainland city of Guangzhou, although there exist some minor differences in accent, pronunciation, and vocabulary.

=== China ===
Distribution of Yue Chinese languages in southeastern China. Standard Cantonese and closely related dialects are highlighted in pink.

Cantonese first developed around the port city of Guangzhou in the Pearl River Delta region of southeastern China. Due to the city's long standing role as an important cultural centre, Cantonese emerged as the prestige dialect of the Yue varieties of Chinese in the Southern Song dynasty and its usage spread around most of what is now the provinces of Guangdong and Guangxi.

Despite the cession of Macau to Portugal in 1557 and Hong Kong to Britain in 1842, the ethnic Chinese population of the two territories largely originated from the 19th and 20th century immigration from Guangzhou and surrounding areas, making Cantonese the predominant Chinese language in the territories. On the mainland, Cantonese continued to serve as the lingua franca of Guangdong and Guangxi even after Mandarin was made the official language of the government by the Qing dynasty in the early 1900s. Cantonese remained a dominant and influential language in southeastern China until the establishment of the People's Republic of China in 1949 and its promotion of Standard Mandarin Chinese as the sole official language of the nation throughout the last half of the 20th century, although its influence still remains strong within the region.

While the Chinese government encourages the use of Standard Mandarin rather than local varieties of Chinese in broadcasts, Cantonese enjoys a relatively higher standing than other Chinese languages, with its own media and usage in public transportation in Guangdong province. Furthermore, it is also a medium of instruction in select academic curricula, including some university elective courses and Chinese as a foreign language programs. The permitted usage of Cantonese in mainland China is largely a countermeasure against the influence from Hong Kong, which has historically enjoyed more media freedom than its former counterpart, as its Cantonese-language media has a substantial exposure and following in Guangdong.

Nevertheless, the place of local Cantonese language and culture remains contentious, as with other non-Mandarin Chinese languages. A 2010 proposal to switch some programming on Guangzhou television from Cantonese to Mandarin was abandoned following massive public protests, the largest since the Tiananmen Square protests of 1989. As a major economic centre of China, there have been concerns that the use of Cantonese in Guangzhou is diminishing in favour of Mandarin, both through the continual influx of Mandarin-speaking migrants from impoverished areas and strict government policies. As a result, Cantonese is being given a more important status by the natives than ever before as a common identity of the local people. This has led to initiatives to revive the language such as its introduction into school curricula and locally produced programs on broadcast media. In 2026, the acting Guangzhou mayor Sun Zhiyang announced proposals and plans to help preserve the city's traditional culture and language of Cantonese. From the YouTube video called Will the Cantonese still be able to spread? Documentary of a 17-year-old girl from Guangzhou stated that Hong Kong University of Science and Technology had conducted a study about Cantonese in Guangzhou that roughly 47% of Guangzhou residents still often communicate in Cantonese but for the demographic residents born in 2000 or onward; less than 35% could speak Cantonese.

=== Southeast Asia ===
Cantonese has historically served as a lingua franca among overseas Chinese in Southeast Asia, who speak a variety of other forms of Chinese including Hokkien, Teochew, and Hakka. Additionally, Cantonese media and popular culture such as Hong Kong cinema is popular throughout the region.

==== Vietnam ====
In Vietnam, Cantonese is the dominant language of the main ethnic Chinese community, usually referred to as Hoa, which numbers about one million people and constitutes one of the largest minority groups in the country. Over half of the ethnic Chinese population in Vietnam speaks Cantonese as a native language and the variety also serves as a lingua franca between the different Chinese dialect groups. Many speakers reflect their exposure to Vietnamese with a Vietnamese accent or a tendency to code-switch between Cantonese and Vietnamese.

==== Malaysia ====
In Malaysia, Cantonese is widely spoken among the Malaysian Chinese community in the capital city of Kuala Lumpur and the surrounding areas in the Klang Valley (Petaling Jaya, Ampang, Putrajaya, Cheras, Selayang, Sungai Buloh, Puchong, Shah Alam, Kajang, Bangi, and Subang Jaya). The language is also widely spoken as well in the town of Sekinchan in the district of Sabak Bernam located in the northern part of Selangor state; the state of Perak, especially in the state capital city of Ipoh and its surrounding towns of Gopeng, Batu Gajah, and Kampar of the Kinta Valley region plus the towns of Tapah and Bidor in the southern part of the Perak state; and most of the state of Negeri Sembilan, especially in the state capital city of Seremban, as well as the towns of Port Dickson, Kuala Pilah, Bahau, Tampin, Rembau and Gemas, with the exception of Jelebu, Mantin, Nilai and Kuala Klawang, where Hokkien and Hakka predominate, respectively. Cantonese is also widely spoken in the eastern Sabahan town of Sandakan as well as the towns of Kuantan, Raub, Bentong, Temerloh, Pekan, Jerantut as well as Cameron Highlands in Pahang state, and they are also found in other areas like Sarikei, Sarawak, and Mersing, Johor.

Although Hokkien is the most natively spoken variety of Chinese and Mandarin is the medium of education at Chinese-language schools, Cantonese is largely influential in the local Chinese media and is used in commerce by Chinese Malaysians.

Due to the popularity of Hong Kong popular culture, especially through drama series and popular music, Cantonese is widely understood by the Chinese in all parts of Malaysia, even though a large proportion of the Chinese Malaysian population is non-Cantonese. Television networks in Malaysia regularly broadcast Hong Kong television programmes in their original Cantonese audio and soundtrack. Cantonese radio is also available in the nation and Cantonese is prevalent in locally produced Chinese television.

Cantonese spoken in Malaysia and Singapore often exhibits influences from Malay and other Chinese varieties spoken in the country, like Hokkien and Teochew.

==== Singapore ====
The Singapore government uses Mandarin as the official Chinese variety and has a Speak Mandarin Campaign (SMC) seeking to actively promote using Mandarin at the expense of other Chinese varieties. A little over 15% of Chinese households in Singapore speak Cantonese. Despite the government actively promoting SMC, the Cantonese-speaking Chinese community has been relatively successful in preserving its language from Mandarin compared with other dialect groups.

Notably, all nationally produced non-Mandarin Chinese TV and radio programs were stopped after 1979. The prime minister, Lee Kuan Yew, then, also stopped giving speeches in Hokkien to prevent giving conflicting signals to the people. Hong Kong (Cantonese) and Taiwanese dramas are unavailable in their untranslated form on free-to-air television, though drama series in non-Chinese languages are available in their original languages. Cantonese drama series on terrestrial TV channels are instead dubbed in Mandarin and broadcast without the original Cantonese audio and soundtrack. However, originals may be available through other sources like cable television and online videos.

Furthermore, an offshoot of SMC is the translation to Hanyu Pinyin of certain terms which originated from southern Chinese varieties. For instance, dim sum is often known as diǎn xīn in Singapore's English-language media, though this is largely a matter of style, and most Singaporeans will still refer to it as dim sum when speaking English.

Nevertheless, since the government restriction on media in non-Mandarin varieties was relaxed in the mid-1990s and 2000s, presence of Cantonese in Singapore has grown substantially. Forms of popular culture from Hong Kong, like television series, cinema and pop music have become popular in Singaporean society, and non-dubbed original versions of the media became widely available. Consequently, the number of non-Cantonese Chinese Singaporeans being able to understand or speak Cantonese to some varying extent is growing, with a number of educational institutes offering Cantonese as an elective language course.

==== Cambodia ====
Cantonese is widely used as the inter-communal language among Chinese Cambodians, especially in Phnom Penh and other urban areas. While Teochew speakers form the majority of the Chinese population in Cambodia, Cantonese is often used as a vernacular in commerce and with other Chinese variant groups in the nation. Chinese-language schools in Cambodia are conducted in both Cantonese and Mandarin, but schools may be conducted exclusively in one Chinese variant or the other.

==== Thailand ====
While Thailand is home to the largest overseas Chinese community in the world, the vast majority of ethnic Chinese in the country speak Thai exclusively. Among Chinese-speaking Thai households, Cantonese is the fourth most-spoken Chinese variety after Teochew, Hakka and Hainanese. Nevertheless, within the Thai Chinese commercial sector, it serves as a common language alongside Teochew or Thai. Chinese-language schools in Thailand have also traditionally been conducted in Cantonese. Furthermore, Cantonese serves as the lingua franca with other Chinese communities in the region.

==== Indonesia ====
In Indonesia, Cantonese is locally known as Konghu and is one of the variants spoken by the Chinese Indonesian community, with speakers largely concentrated in certain major cities like Jakarta, Medan, Surabaya, Makassar, Semarang, Manado and Batam. However, it has a relatively minor presence compared to other Southeast Asian nations, being the fourth most spoken Chinese variety after Hokkien, Hakka and Teochew.

=== North America ===
==== United States ====
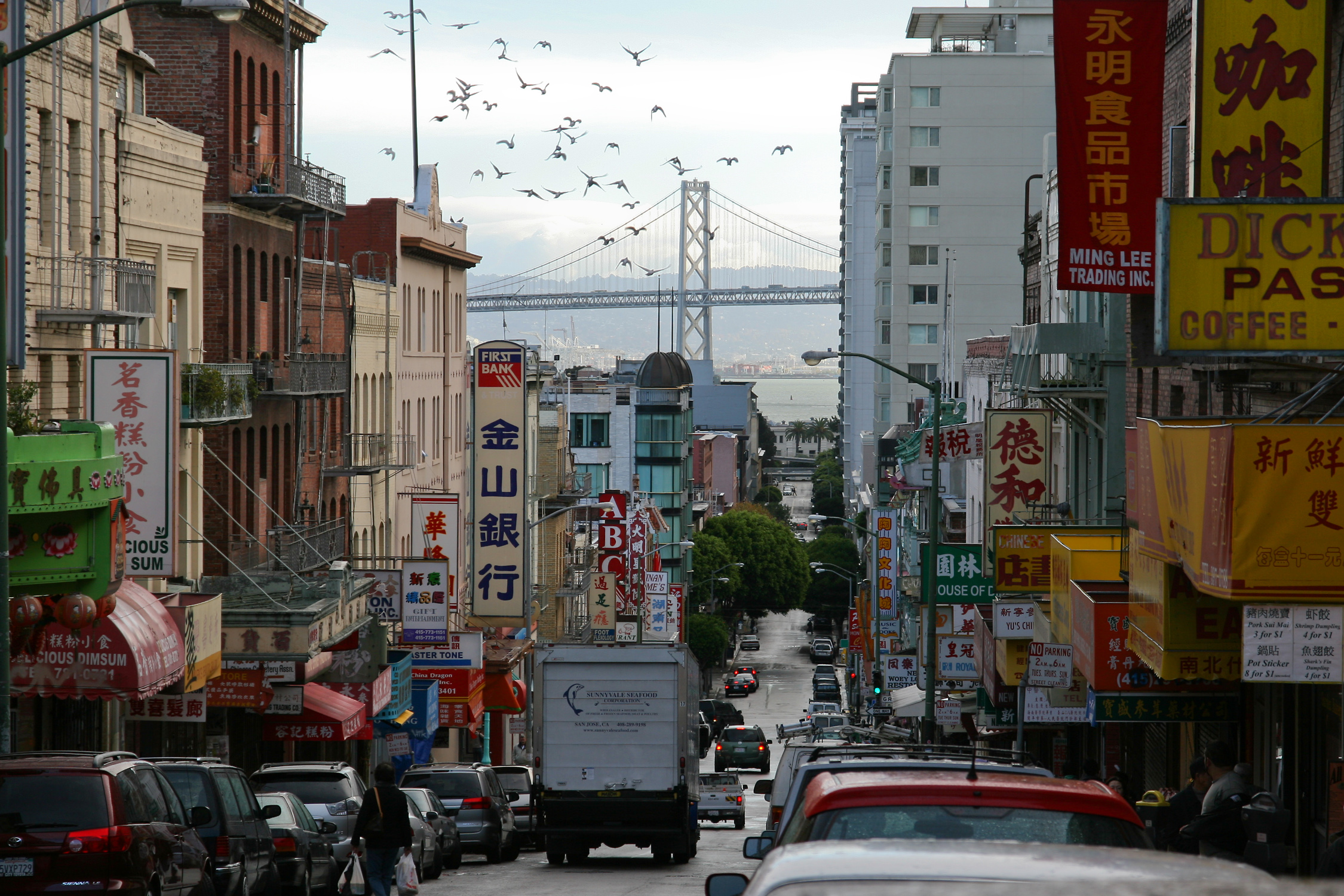
Street in Chinatown, San Francisco. Cantonese has traditionally been the dominant Chinese variant among Chinese populations in the Western world.

Over a period of 150 years (from 1850 to the 2000s), Guangdong has been the place-of-origin for most Chinese emigrants to Western nations; one coastal county, Taishan (or Tóisàn, where the Sìyì or sei yap variety of Yue is spoken), alone may be the origin of the vast majority of Chinese immigrants to the U.S. before 1965. As a result, Yue languages such as Cantonese and the closely related variety of Taishanese have been the major Chinese varieties traditionally spoken in the United States. In 2009, 458,840 Americans spoke Cantonese at home according to an American Community Survey.

The Zhongshan variant of Cantonese, which originated from the western Pearl River Delta, is spoken by many Chinese immigrants in Hawaii, and some in San Francisco and the Sacramento River Delta (see Locke, California). It is a Yuehai variety much like Guangzhou Cantonese but has "flatter" tones. Chinese is the second most widely spoken non-English language in the United States when both Cantonese and Mandarin are combined, behind Spanish. Many institutes of higher education have traditionally had Chinese programs based on Cantonese, with some continuing to offer these programs despite the rise of Mandarin. The most popular romanization for learning Cantonese in the United States is Yale romanization.

The majority of Chinese emigrants have traditionally originated from Guangdong and Guangxi, as well as Hong Kong and Macau (beginning in the latter half of the 20th century and before the handover) and Southeast Asia, with Cantonese as their native language. However, more recent immigrants are arriving from the rest of mainland China and Taiwan and most often speak Standard Mandarin (Putonghua) as their native language, although some may also speak their native local variety, such as Shanghainese, Hokkien, Fuzhounese, Hakka, etc. As a result, Mandarin is becoming more common among the Chinese American community.

The increase of Mandarin-speaking communities has resulted in the rise of separate neighbourhoods or enclaves segregated by the primary Chinese variety spoken. Socioeconomic statuses are also a factor. For example, in New York City, Cantonese still predominates in the city's older, traditional western portion of Chinatown in Manhattan and in Brooklyn's small new Chinatowns in Bensonhurst and Homecrest. The newly emerged Little Fuzhou eastern portion of Manhattan's Chinatown and Brooklyn's main large Chinatown in and around Sunset Park are mostly populated by Fuzhounese speakers, who often speak Mandarin as well. The Cantonese and Fuzhounese enclaves in New York City are more working class. However, due to the rapid gentrification of Manhattan's Chinatown and with NYC's Cantonese and Fuzhou populations now increasingly shifting to other Chinese enclaves in the Outer Boroughs of NYC, such as Brooklyn and Queens, but mainly in Brooklyn's newer Chinatowns, the Cantonese speaking population in NYC is now increasingly concentrated in Bensonhurst's Little Hong Kong/Guangdong and Homecrest's Little Hong Kong/Guangdong. The Fuzhou population of NYC is becoming increasingly concentrated in Brooklyn's Sunset Park, also known as Little Fuzhou, which is causing the city's growing Cantonese and Fuzhou enclaves to become increasingly distanced and isolated from both each other and other Chinese enclaves in Queens. Flushing's Chinatown, which is now the largest Chinatown in the city, and Elmhurst's smaller Chinatown in Queens are very diverse, with large numbers of Mandarin speakers from different regions of China and Taiwan. The Chinatowns of Queens comprise the primary cultural centre for New York City's Chinese population and are more middle class.

In Northern California, especially the San Francisco Bay Area, Cantonese has historically dominated in the Chinatowns of San Francisco and Oakland, as well as the surrounding suburbs and metropolitan area, although since the late 2000s a concentration of Mandarin speakers has formed in Silicon Valley. In contrast, Southern California hosts a much larger Mandarin-speaking population, with Cantonese found in more historical Chinese communities such as that of Chinatown, Los Angeles, and older Chinese ethnic enclaves such as San Gabriel, Rosemead, and Temple City. Mandarin predominates in much of the emergent Chinese American enclaves in eastern Los Angeles County and other areas of the metropolitan region.

While a number of more-established Taiwanese immigrants have learned Cantonese to foster relations with the traditional Cantonese-speaking Chinese American population, more recent arrivals and the larger number of mainland Chinese immigrants have largely continued to use Mandarin as the exclusive variety of Chinese. This has led to a linguistic discrimination that has also contributed to social conflicts between the two sides, with a growing number of Chinese Americans (including American-born Chinese) of Cantonese background defending the historic Chinese-American culture against the impacts of increasing Mandarin-speaking new arrivals.

==== Canada ====
Cantonese is the most common Chinese variety spoken among Chinese Canadians. According to the Canada 2016 census, there were 565,275 Canadian residents who reported Cantonese as their native language. Among the self-reported Cantonese speakers, 44% were born in Hong Kong, 27% were born in Guangdong Province, and 18% were Canadian-born. Cantonese-speakers can be found in every city with a Chinese community. The majority of Cantonese-speakers in Canada live in the Greater Toronto Area and Metro Vancouver. There are sufficient Cantonese-speakers in Canada that there exist locally produced Cantonese TV and radio programming, such as Fairchild TV.

As in the United States, the Chinese Canadian community traces its roots to early immigrants from Guangdong during the latter half of the 19th century. Later Chinese immigrants came from Hong Kong in two waves, first in the late 1960s to mid 1970s, and again in the 1980s to late 1990s on fears arising from the 1989 Tiananmen Square protests and impending handover to the People's Republic of China. Chinese-speaking immigrants from conflict zones in Southeast Asia, especially Vietnam, arrived as well, beginning in the mid-1970s and were also largely Cantonese-speaking.

=== Western Europe ===
==== United Kingdom ====
The overwhelming majority of Chinese speakers in the United Kingdom use Cantonese, with about 300,000 British people claiming it as their first language. This is largely due to the presence of British Hong Kongers and the fact that many British Chinese also have origins in the former British colonies in Southeast Asia of Singapore and Malaysia.

==== France ====
Among the Chinese community in France, Cantonese is spoken by immigrants who fled the former French Indochina (Vietnam, Cambodia and Laos) following the conflicts and communist takeovers in the region during the 1970s. While a slight majority of ethnic Chinese from Indochina speak Teochew at home, knowledge of Cantonese is prevalent due to its historic prestige status in the region and is used for commercial and community purposes between the different Chinese variety groups. As in the United States, there is a divide between Cantonese-speakers and those speaking other mainland Chinese varieties.

==== Portugal ====
Cantonese is spoken by ethnic Chinese in Portugal who originate from Macau, the most established Chinese community in the nation with a presence dating back to the 16th century and Portuguese colonialism. Since the late-20th century, however, Mandarin- and Wu-speaking migrants from mainland China have outnumbered those from Macau, although Cantonese is still retained among mainstream Chinese community associations.

=== Australia ===
Cantonese was the dominant Chinese language of the Chinese Australian community from the time the first ethnic Chinese settlers arrived in the 1850s until the mid-2000s, when a heavy increase in immigration from Mandarin-speakers largely from mainland China led to Mandarin surpassing Cantonese as the dominant Chinese dialect spoken. Cantonese is the third most-spoken language in Australia. In the 2011 census, the Australian Bureau of Statistics listed 336,410 and 263,673 speakers of Mandarin and Cantonese, respectively. By 2016, those numbers became 596,711 and 280,943.

== Cultural role ==
Letter to the Emperor by Su Xun, 1058, recited and explained in Cantonese by Jasper Tsang.

Spoken Chinese exhibits a multitude of regional and local varieties, many of which are mutually unintelligible. The majority of these varieties are not widely spoken outside of their native regions, although they may be encountered in other parts of the world. Additionally, numerous varieties possess both literary and colloquial readings of Chinese characters for newer standard reading sounds. Since a 1909 decree of the Qing dynasty, the government of China has promoted Mandarin for use in education, the media, and official communications. However, the proclamation of Mandarin as the official national language was not fully accepted by the Cantonese authorities in the early 20th century. Proponents of the regional uniqueness of their local language and the commercial importance of the region argued that Cantonese should be preserved. In contrast to other non-Mandarin Chinese varieties, Cantonese persists in a few state television and radio broadcasts today.

Nevertheless, there have been recent efforts to reduce the use of Cantonese in China. The most notable of these has been the 2010 proposal put forth by Guangzhou Television, which called for an increase in Mandarin broadcasts at the expense of Cantonese programmes. This, however, resulted in protests in Guangzhou, which ultimately dissuaded the authorities from pursuing the proposal. Furthermore, there are reports of students being punished for speaking other Chinese languages at school, which has led to a reluctance among younger children to communicate in their native languages, including Cantonese. Such actions have further provoked Cantonese speakers to cherish their linguistic identity in contrast to migrants who have generally arrived from poorer areas of China and largely speak Mandarin or other Chinese languages.

Due to the linguistic history of Hong Kong and Macau, and the use of Cantonese in many established overseas Chinese communities, the use of Cantonese is quite widespread compared to the presence of its speakers residing in China. Cantonese is the predominant Chinese variety spoken in Hong Kong and Macau. In these areas, public discourse takes place almost exclusively in Cantonese, making it the only variety of Chinese other than Mandarin to be used as an official language in the world. Because of their dominance in Chinese diaspora overseas, standard Cantonese and its dialect Taishanese are among the most common Chinese languages that one may encounter in the West.

Increasingly since the 1997 handover, Cantonese has been used as a symbol of local identity in Hong Kong, largely through the development of democracy in the territory‌ to emphasise a separate Hong Kong identity.

A similar identity issue exists in the United States, where conflicts have arisen among Chinese-speakers due to a large recent influx of Mandarin-speakers. While older Taiwanese immigrants have learned Cantonese to foster integration within the traditional Chinese American populations, more recent arrivals from the mainland continue to use Mandarin exclusively. This has contributed to a segregation of communities based on linguistic cleavage. In particular, some Chinese Americans (including American-born Chinese) of Cantonese background emphasise their non-mainland origins (e.g. Hong Kong, Macau, Vietnam, etc.) to assert their identity in the face of new waves of immigration.

Along with Mandarin and Hokkien, Cantonese has its own popular music, Cantopop, which is the predominant genre in Hong Kong. Many artists from the mainland and Taiwan have learned Cantonese to break into the market. Popular native Mandarin-speaking singers, including Faye Wong, Eric Moo, and singers from Taiwan, have been trained in Cantonese to add "Hong Kong-ness" to their performances.

Cantonese films date to the early days of Chinese cinema, and the first Cantonese talkie, White Gold Dragon, was made in 1932 by the Tianyi Film Company. Despite a ban on Cantonese films by the Nanjing authority in the 1930s, Cantonese film production continued in Hong Kong which was then under British colonial rule. From the mid-1970s to the 1990s, Cantonese films made in Hong Kong were very popular in the Chinese speaking world.

== Phonology ==
=== Initials and finals ===
The de facto standard for Cantonese pronunciation is that of Canton (Guangzhou). While there are some minor phonological variations between Hong Kong Cantonese and standard Guangzhou Cantonese, the two forms are almost identical.

The phonemic systems of Hong Kong and Macau exhibit a tendency to merge certain phoneme pairs, in what is disparagingly referred to as "lazy sound/pronunciation" (simplified Chinese: 懒音; traditional Chinese: 懶音; Jyutping: laan5 jam1), despite having been prevalent in the territories since the early 20th century. The most notable difference between Hong Kong and Guangzhou pronunciation is substituting the liquid /l/ for nasal initial /n/ in many words. For example, the word for "you" (你) is pronounced as [nei˩˧] in Guangzhou, but as [lei˩˧] in Hong Kong.

Another key feature of Hong Kong Cantonese is the two syllabic nasals /ŋ̍˨˩/ and /m̩˨˩/ merging. This can be exemplified in the elimination of the contrast of sounds between 吳 (Ng, a surname) ([ŋ̍˨˩] in Guangzhou pronunciation) and 唔 (not) ([m̩˨˩] in Guangzhou pronunciation). Hong Kong Cantonese pronounce both words as the latter.

Lastly, the initials /kʷ/ and /kʷʰ/ are merging into /k/ and /kʰ/ when followed by /ɔː/. An example is in the word for country (國), pronounced in standard Guangzhou as [kʷɔk] but as [kɔk] with the merge. Unlike the above two differences, this merge is alongside the standard pronunciation in Hong Kong rather than being replaced. Educated speakers often stick to the standard pronunciation but can exemplify the merged pronunciation in casual speech. In contrast, less educated speakers pronounce the merge more frequently.

Less prevalent, but still notable differences found among a number of Hong Kong speakers include:

- Merging /ŋ/ initial into null initial
- Merging /ŋ/ and /k/ codas into /n/ and /t/ codas respectively, eliminating contrast between these pairs of finals (except after /e/ and /o/): /aːn/-/aːŋ/, /aːt/-/aːk/, /ɐn/-/ɐŋ/, /ɐt/-/ɐk/, /ɔːn/-/ɔːŋ/ and /ɔːt/-/ɔːk/.
- Merging the rising tones (陰上 2nd and 陽上 5th).

Cantonese vowels tend to be traced further back to Middle Chinese than their Mandarin analogues, such as M. /aɪ/ vs. C. /ɔːi/; M. /i/ vs. C. /ɐi/; M. /ɤ/ vs. C. /ɔː/; M. /ɑʊ/ vs. C. /ou/ etc. For consonants, some differences include M. /ɕ, tɕ, tɕʰ/ vs. C. /h, k, kʰ/; M. /ʐ/ vs. C. /j/; and a greater syllable coda diversity in Cantonese (like syllables ending in -p, -t or -k).

=== Tones ===
Generally speaking, Cantonese is a tonal language with six phonetic tones, two more than the four in Standard Chinese Mandarin. This makes Cantonese in general harder to master due to required ability of users to readily be able to process two additional phonetic tones. People who grew up using Cantonese tones can usually hear the tonal differences with no problem, but adults who were brought up speaking non-tonal languages like English and most Western European languages may not be able to distinguish the tonal differences quick enough to optimally use the language. This difficulty also applies to tonal language speakers with fewer tones attempting to master languages with more tones such as Mandarin natives trying to learn spoken Cantonese as adults.

Historically, finals that end in a stop consonant were considered as "checked tones" and treated separately by diachronic convention, identifying Cantonese with nine tones (九声六调). However, these are seldom counted as phonemic tones in modern linguistics, which prefer to analyse them as conditioned by the following consonant.

Syllable type						
Tone name	dark flat (陰平)	dark rising (陰上)	dark departing (陰去)	light flat (陽平)	light rising (陽上)	light departing (陽去)
Description	high falling, high level	medium rising	medium level	low falling, very low level	low rising	low level
Yale or Jyutping tone number	1	2	3	4	5	6
Example	詩	史	試	時	市	是
Tone letter	siː˥˧, siː˥	siː˧˥	siː˧	siː˨˩, siː˩	siː˩˧	siː˨
IPA diacritic	sîː, síː	sǐː	sīː	si̖ː, sı̏ː	si̗ː	sìː
Yale diacritic	sì	sí	si	sìh	síh	sih

=== Changed tones ===
Sometimes, a change will occur in the tone of a character when read in different contexts. Generally speaking, there is no strict rule for when tone changes occur, although there are some patterns. For example, tone changes usually affect nouns, verbs, compounds, reduplications, and certain nouns of address, like with 爺爺 "ye^{4} ye^{4-2}" and 哥哥 "go^{1-4} go^{1}". The most common tone for a tone to change to is the mid-rising tone (tone 2), examples include 耳環 "ji^{5} waan^{4-2}" and 男人 "naam^{4} jan^{4-2}".

== Written Cantonese ==
As Cantonese is predominantly utilised in Hong Kong, Macau, and other overseas Chinese communities, it is typically inscribed with traditional Chinese characters. Nevertheless, it incorporates supplementary characters and characters with disparate meanings from written vernacular Chinese, due to the presence of lexical items that are either absent from standard Chinese or correspond with spoken Cantonese. This written Cantonese system frequently manifests in colloquial contexts, such as entertainment magazines, social media, and advertisements.

In contrast, formal literature, professional and government documents, television and movie subtitles, and news media continue to use standard written Chinese. Nevertheless, colloquial characters may be present in formal written communications such as legal testimonies and newspapers when an individual is being quoted, rather than paraphrasing spoken Cantonese into standard written Chinese.

== Romanisation ==
Systems of Cantonese romanisation are based on the accents of Canton and Hong Kong and have helped define the concept of Standard Cantonese. The major systems are (in order of their invention from newest to oldest): Jyutping, the Chinese government's Guangdong Romanisation, Yale, Meyer–Wempe, and Standard Romanisation. Jyutping and Yale are the two most used and taught systems today in the West, and they do not differ greatly from one another except in how they mark tones. Additionally, Hong Kong linguist Sidney Lau modified the Yale system for his popular Cantonese-as-a-second-language course, and his variant is another system in use today.

Hong Kong's and Macau's governments use systems of romanisation for proper names and geographic locations, but they transcribe some sounds inconsistently. These systems are not taught in schools. Macau's system differs slightly from Hong Kong's in that the spellings are influenced by Portuguese language due to colonial history. For example, while many words in Macau's system are the same as Hong Kong's (e.g. surnames Lam 林, Chan 陳), instances of the letter ⟨u⟩ under Hong Kong's system are often replaced by ⟨o⟩ in Macau's (e.g. Chau vs. Chao 周, Leung vs Leong 梁). Neither the spellings of Hong Kong's system nor of Macau's look very similar to mainland China's system called pinyin, chiefly because it distinguishes between Mandarin's two series of stops while they, although the pronunciation of Standard Cantonese's two series is similar to the Mandarin, do not generally distinguish them, they thus rendering not only /pʰ/, /tʰ/, and so forth, but also /p/, /t/, and the remaining non-aspirates, by the simple spellings ⟨p⟩, ⟨t⟩, etc. vs. it rendering the latter series by ⟨b⟩, ⟨d⟩, and the like.

=== Early Western efforts ===
Systematic efforts to develop an alphabetic representation of Cantonese began with Protestant missionaries arriving in China early in the nineteenth century. Romanization was considered both a tool to help new missionaries learn the variety more easily and a quick route for the unlettered to achieve gospel-literacy. Earlier Catholic missionaries, mostly Portuguese, had developed romanisation-schemes for the pronunciation current in the court and capital city of China but made few efforts to romanize other varieties.

Robert Morrison, the first Protestant missionary in China, published a Vocabulary of the Canton Dialect (1828) with a rather unsystematic romanized pronunciation. Elijah Coleman Bridgman and Samuel Wells Williams in their Chinese Chrestomathy in the Canton Dialect (1841) were the progenitors of a long-lived lineage of related romanisations that with minor variations are embodied in the works of James Dyer Ball, Ernst Johann Eitel, and Immanuel Gottlieb Genähr (1910). Bridgman and Williams based their system on the phonetic alphabet and diacritics proposed by Sir William Jones for South Asian languages.

Their system of romanisation embodied the phonological system of a local-dialect rhyme-dictionary, the Fenyun cuoyao, which was widely used and easily obtainable at the time and is still available today. Samuel Wells Willams' Tonic Dictionary of the Chinese Language in the Canton Dialect (Yinghua fenyun cuoyao, 1856) is an alphabetic rearrangement, translation, and annotation of this Fenyun. To adapt the system to the needs of users in an era when there was no standard, but rather only a range of local variants—although the speech of the western suburbs (Xiguan 西關) of Guangzhou was the prestige variety—Williams suggested that users learn and follow their teacher's pronunciation of his chart of Cantonese syllables. It was apparently Bridgman's innovation to mark the tones with (for the upper-register ones) open circles vs. (for the lower-register tones) underlined open circles, in either case at the four corners of the romanised word in analogy with the traditional Chinese system of marking the tone of a character with a circle (lower left for "even", upper left for "rising", upper right for "going", and lower right for "entering" tones).

John Chalmers in his English and Cantonese Pocket-Dictionary (1859) simplified the tone-markings by using: a syllable-final acute accent to mark "rising" tones, a syllable-final grave one to mark the "going" tones, no diacritic for the "even" tones, and italics (or in hand-written work underlining) to mark tones as belonging to the upper register. "Entering" tones could be distinguished by the consonants with which they end (p/t/k). Nicholas Belfeld Dennys used Chalmers' romanisation in his primer. This method of marking tones was in most of its details used later also by the Yale romanization, where however, importantly, instead of the upper-register tones being marked by italics, the lower-register ones are marked by an 'h' (which comes after whatever letter spells the last vocalic element in the syllable). Another innovation of Chalmers in this dictionary was to eliminate acute/grave accents on top of vowels by adding more distinctions of vowel-spelling (e.g. a/aa, o/oh), so that the presence vs. absence of an accent over the vowel was no longer needed to distinguish different pronunciations of it.

This new style of romanisation still embodied the phonology of the Fenyun, and the name of Tipson is associated with its particular variety that then was fixed upon by his missionary peers to become Standard Romanization. This was the system used importantly: (with virtually no deviation) by Meyer-Wempe's dictionary, (even more faithfully) by Cowles' dictionaries (of 1917 & 1965), by O'Melia's textbook, and by many other works in the first two thirds of the twentieth century. It reigned without serious challenge as the standard spelling until Yale's system was devised and became an important rival to it.

The major linguist Y. R. Chao developed a Cantonese adaptation of his Gwoyeu Romatzyh system. It was first used in Chao's Cantonese Primer, published in 1947 by Harvard University Press (which then in 1948, changed by him very little beyond swapping in of Pekingese for the Cantonese, became his Mandarin Primer, published by the same Press). The system was then modified by K. M. A. Barnett in 1950 into the Barnett-Chao romanization system. The B–C system was used in a handful of texts, including textbooks published by the Hong Kong government, such as Cantonese Conversation Grammar, published in 1963.

=== Cantonese romanisation in Hong Kong ===
An influential work on Cantonese, A Chinese Syllabary Pronounced According to the Dialect of Canton, written by Wong Shik Ling, was published in 1941. He devised an IPA-based system of transcription, the S. L. Wong system, used by many Chinese dictionaries later published in Hong Kong. Although Wong also devised a romanisation-scheme, likewise known as the S. L. Wong system, the latter is not as widely used as his transcription. This system succeeded the Barnett–Chao system as being the one used by the Hong Kong Government Language School.

The Linguistic Society of Hong Kong (LSHK) has advocated the romanisation it devised (and named Jyutping). An arguable advantage of it is that its particular use of J for instance (as at the beginning of its name) matches IPA in contrast to most other systems' using Y, resembling English. Some effort has been made to promote Jyutping, but it has yet to be examined how successfully this has caused use of it to proliferate in the region.

Another popular scheme is ILE romanisation, the only system of romanisation accepted by the Hong Kong Education and Manpower Bureau and Hong Kong Examinations and Assessment Authority. Books and studies for teachers and students in primary and secondary schools usually use this scheme, but some teachers and students use S.L. Wong's system of transcription.

Those learning Cantonese may feel frustrated that, despite efforts to standardise Cantonese romanisations, most native Cantonese speakers, regardless of their level of education, are unfamiliar with any romanisation beyond the conventional, Latin-letter spellings of Cantonese names. Because Cantonese is primarily a spoken language, meaning that its speakers do not in most genres of writing use its own writing-system (instead, in most of their writing, despite having some Chinese characters unique to Cantonese, primarily following modern standard Chinese, which is closely tied to Mandarin), therefore, Chinese characters unique to Cantonese are not taught in schools. As a result, locals do not learn any of these systems. In contrast to the general use of romanisation in Mandarin-speaking areas of China, systems of romanisation for Cantonese are excluded from the educational systems of both Hong Kong and the province of Guangdong. In practice, Hong Kong follows a loose, unnamed romanisation-scheme used by the Government of Hong Kong.

Google's Cantonese input uses Yale, Jyutping, or Cantonese Pinyin (ILE romanisation), the Yale being the first standard.

=== Comparison ===
Differences between the three main standards are highlighted in bold. Jyutping and ILE recognise certain sounds used in a few colloquial words (like /tɛːu˨/ 掉, /lɛːm˧˥/ 舔, and /kɛːp˨/ 夾) but have not been officially recognised in other systems like Yale. Letters Q, R, V and X are not used in any of the systems.

==== Initials ====
Romanization system	Initial consonant																		
Romanization system	Labial				Dental/Alveolar				Sibilant			Velar			Labial–velar		Glottal	Approximant	
IPA	幫 p	滂 pʰ	明 m	非 f	端 t	透 tʰ	泥 n	來 l	精 **ts**	清 **tsʰ**	心 s	見 k	溪kʰ	我 ŋ	古 kʷ	困 kʷʰ	曉 h	以 **j**	云 w
Yale	b	p	m	f	d	t	n	l	**j**	**ch**	s	g	k	ng	gw	kw	h	**y**	w
ILE	b	p	m	f	d	t	n	l	**dz**	**ts**	s	g	k	ng	gw	kw	h	**j**	w
Jyutping	b	p	m	f	d	t	n	l	**z**	**c**	s	g	k	ng	gw	kw	h	**j**	w

==== Finals ====
Romanization system	Main vowel																																
Romanization system	/aː/									/ɐ/									/ɛː/, /e/							/iː/, /ɪ/							
IPA	**aː**	aːi	aːu	aːm	aːn	aːŋ	aːp	aːt	aːk	**ɐ** (Note: Jyutping recognizes the distinction between final "short a" /ɐ/ and "long a" /aː/. The "short a" can occur in elided syllables such as the 十 in 四十四 (sei3-a6-sei3), which the other systems would transcribe with same spelling as the "long a".)	ɐi	ɐu	ɐm	ɐn	ɐŋ	ɐp	ɐt	ɐk	ɛː	ei	**ɛːu**	**ɛːm**	ɛːŋ	**ɛːp**	ɛːk	iː	iːu	iːm	iːn	ɪŋ	iːp	iːt	ɪk
Yale	**a**	aai	aau	aam	aan	aang	aap	aat	aak	**a**	ai	au	am	an	ang	ap	at	ak	e	ei			eng		ek	i	iu	im	in	ing	ip	it	ik
ILE	**aa**	aai	aau	aam	aan	aang	aap	aat	aak	**aa**	ai	au	am	an	ang	ap	at	ak	e	ei	**eu**	**em**	eng	**ep**	ek	i	iu	im	in	ing	ip	it	ik
Jyutping	**aa**	aai	aau	aam	aan	aang	aap	aat	aak	**a**	ai	au	am	an	ang	ap	at	ak	e	ei	**eu**	**em**	eng	**ep**	ek	i	iu	im	in	ing	ip	it	ik

Romanization system	Main vowel																							Syllabic consonant	
Romanization system	/ɔː/, /o/							/uː/, /ʊ/						/œː/				/ɵ/			/yː/			Syllabic consonant	
IPA	ɔː	ɔːi	ou	ɔːn	ɔːŋ	ɔːt	ɔːk	uː	uːi	uːn	ʊŋ	uːt	ʊk	**œː**	**œːŋ**	**œːt**	**œːk**	**ɵy**	**ɵn**	**ɵt**	**yː**	**yːn**	**yːt**	m̩	ŋ̍
Yale	o	oi	ou	on	ong	ot	ok	u	ui	un	ung	ut	uk	**eu**	**eung**		**euk**	**eui**	**eun**	**eut**	**yu**	**yun**	**yut**	m	ng
ILE	o	oi	ou	on	ong	ot	ok	u	ui	un	ung	ut	uk	**oe**	**oeng**		**oek**	**oey**	**oen**	**oet**	**y**	**yn**	**yt**	m	ng
Jyutping	o	oi	ou	on	ong	ot	ok	u	ui	un	ung	ut	uk	**oe**	**oeng**	**oet**	**oek**	**eoi**	**eon**	**eot**	**yu**	**yun**	**yut**	m	ng

==== Tones ====
Romanization system	Tone								
Romanization system	Dark (陰)			Light (陽)			Checked (入聲)		
Chao Tone Contour	53, 55	35	33	21, 11	24, 13	22	5	3	2
IPA Tone Letters	˥˧, ˥	˧˥	˧	˨˩, ˩	˨˦, ˩˧	˨	˥	˧	˨
Yale	à	á	a	àh	áh	ah	āk	ak	ahk
ILE	1	2	3	4	5	6	7	8	9
Jyutping	1	2	3	4	5	6	1	3	6

== Sample text ==
The following is a sample text in Cantonese of Article 1 of the Universal Declaration of Human Rights with English.

Cantonese	人人生而自由，喺尊嚴同埋權利上一律平等。佢哋有理性同埋良心，而且應當以兄弟關係嘅精神相對待。
IPA	/jɐn˨˩ jɐn˨˩ sɐŋ˥˧ ji:˨˩ tsiː˨ jɐuː˨˩, hɐi˧˥ tsy:n˥˧ jiːm˨˩ tʰʊŋ˨˩ ma:i˨˩ kʰyːn˨˩ lei˨ sœ:ŋ˨ jɐt˥ lɵt˨ pʰɪŋ˨˩ tɐŋ˧˥. kʰɵy˩˧ tei˨ jɐu˩˧ lei˩˧ sɪŋ˧ tʰʊŋ˨˩ ma:i˨˩ lœ:ŋ˨˩ sɐm˥˧, ji:˨˩ tsʰɛ:˧˥ jɪŋ˥ tɔ:ŋ˥˧ ji:˩˧ jy:˩˧ hɪŋ˥˧ tɐi˨ kʷaːn˥˧ hɐi˨ kɛ:˧ tsɪŋ˥˧ sɐn˨˩ sœ:ŋ˥˧ tɵy˧ tɔ:i˨./
Yale romanisation	yàhnyàhn sàng yìh jihyàuh, hái jyùnyìhm tùhngmàaih kyùhn leih seuhng yātleuht pìhngdáng. kéuihdeih yáuh léihsing tùhngmàaih lèuhngsàm, yìhché yìngdòng yíh hìngdaih gwàanhaih ge jìngsàhn sèung deui doih.
ILE romanisation	jan4 jan4 sang1 ji4 dzi6 jau4, hai2 dzyn1 jim4 tung4 maai4 kyn4 lei6 soeng6 jat7 loet9 ping4 dang2. koey5 dei6 jau5 lei5 sing3 tung4 maai4 loeng4 sam1, ji4 tse2 jing1 dong1 ji5 hing1 dai6 gwaan1 hai6 ge3 dzing1 san4 soeng1 doey3 doi6.
Jyutping romanisation	jan4 jan4 sang1 ji4 zi6 jau4, hai2 zyun1 jim4 tung4 maai4 kyun4 lei6 soeng6 jat1 leot6 ping4 dang2. keoi5 dei2 jau5 lei5 sing3 tung4 maai4 loeng4 sam1, ji4 ce2 jing1 dong1 ji5 hing1 dai6 gwaan1 hai6 ge3 zing1 san4 soeng1 deoi3 doi6.
English original:	"All human beings are born free and equal in dignity and rights. They are endowed with reason and conscience and should act towards one another in a spirit of brotherhood."

== See also ==
- Cantonese grammar
- Cantonese profanity
- Cantonese slang
- Cantonese nationalism
- Languages of China
- List of English words of Chinese origin
- List of varieties of Chinese
- Protection of the varieties of Chinese
