= Meyer–Wempe =

System of the romanisation of Cantonese

Meyer–Wempe romanization was the system used by two Roman Catholic missionaries in Hong Kong, Bernard F. Meyer and Theodore F. Wempe, for romanizing Cantonese in their Student's Cantonese English Dictionary published in 1935.

== Provenance ==
Although some attribute development of the system to them, there was nothing new in it as their entire schema followed the system devised in the last decade of the 19th century known as Standard Romanization (SR), which, in turn, was almost identical to John Chalmers' system of 1870. Chalmers' system was significant in that it was the first system to virtually do away with diacritics entirely, the sole survivor being his final ö, which is eu in the Standard Romanization while being in this one oeh.

== Initials ==
p [p]	p' [pʰ]	m [m]	f [f]	
t [t]	t' [tʰ]	n [n]		l [l]
k [k]	k' [kʰ]	ng [ŋ]	h [h]	
kw [kw]	k'w [kʰw]			oo, w [w]
ts [ts]	ts' [tsʰ]		s [s]	i, y [j]
ch [tɕ]	ch' [tɕʰ]		sh [ɕ]	

The distinction between the alveolar sibilants ([ts], [tsʰ], and [s]) and alveolo-palatal sibilants ([tɕ], [tɕʰ], and [ɕ]) has been lost in modern Cantonese, though the distinction still existed at the time this system was devised. See Cantonese phonology for more information.

== Finals ==
a [aː]	aai [aːi]	aau [aːu]	aam [aːm]	aan [aːn]	aang [aːŋ]	aap [aːp]	aat [aːt]	aak [aːk]
	ai [ɐi]	au [ɐu]	am, om [ɐm]	an [ɐn]	ang [ɐŋ]	ap, op [ɐp]	at [ɐt]	ak [ɐk]
e [ɛː]	ei [ei]				eng [ɛːŋ]			ek [ɛːk]
i [iː]		iu [iːu]	im [iːm]	in [iːn]	ing [eŋ]	ip [iːp]	it [iːt]	ik [ek]
oh [ɔː]	oi [ɔːy]	o [ou]		on [ɔːn]	ong [ɔːŋ]		ot [ɔːt]	ok [ɔːk]
oo [uː]	ooi [uːy]			oon [uːn]	ung [oŋ]		oot [uːt]	uk [ok]
oeh [œː]	ui [ɵy]			un [ɵn]	eung [œːŋ]		ut [ɵt]	euk [œːk]
ue [yː]				uen [yːn]			uet [yːt]	
			m [m̩]		ng [ŋ̍]			

The finals m and ng can only be used as standalone nasal syllables.

== Tones ==
Diacritics are used to mark the six tones of Cantonese. The tone mark should be placed above the first letter of the final.

No.	Description	Contour	Tone mark	Example
1	high flat/high falling	55 / 53	No mark	ma
2	high rising	35	Acute accent ( ´ )	má
3	mid flat	33	Grave accent ( ` )	mà
4	low falling	21	Circumflex ( ˆ )	mâ
5	low rising	23	Breve ( ˘ )	mă
6	low flat	22	Macron( ¯ )	mā
