= Barnett–Chao Romanisation =

System for the romanisation of Cantonese

Barnett–Chao (abbreviated here as B–C) is a Cantonese Romanisation system based on the principles of the Gwoyeu Romatzyh system (GR) developed by Yuen Ren Chao in the 1920s, which he modified in 1947. The B-C system is a modification in 1950 by K. M. A. Barnett (an Administrative Officer of the Hong Kong Government) from Yuen Ren Chao's romanisation system. It was adopted by the School of Oriental and African Studies, London (SOAS).

Barnett-Chao was used in the Chinese Language Training Section (formerly the Government Language School) of the Government Training Division of the Hong Kong Government from 1963 to 1967 but its transcription was considered "over-complicated" for teaching Cantonese as a second language and abandoned in favour of Sidney Lau's version of Standard Romanisation.

After appearing in only a handful of texts, it fell into disuse.

== Description ==
Like GR spelling, B–C spelling uses contrasting unvoiced/voiced pairs of consonants to represent aspirated and unaspirated sounds. B–C also uses single versus double vowels letters to represent certain short + high versus long + low final vowels even in open syllables where the contrast does not exist: buk, buut, baa, and different letters to represent the contrast in other cases: sek, sin. Some vowels are only long and do not use doubling to represent length: ea, o, y.

The Cantonese high and low pitch registers are indicated by inserting -h- or -r- after the initial: bhat, brat. Medium pitch register has no insert, and is considered the basic form: baa.

=== Basic forms ===
The following two tables list the B–C spellings of initials and finals with their corresponding IPA values.

=== Initials ===
b [p]	p [pʰ]	m [m]	f [f]
d [t]	t [tʰ]	n [n]	l [l]
g [k]	k [kʰ]	ng [ŋ]	x [h]
q [ʔ]
z [ts]	c [tsʰ]	s [s]	
gw [kw]	kw [kʰw]	j [j]	w [w]

=== Finals ===
aa [a]	aai [ai]	aau [au]	aam [am]	aan [an]	aang [aŋ]	aap [ap]	aat [at]	aak [ak]
	ai [ɐi]	au [ɐu]	am [ɐm]	an [ɐn]	ang [ɐŋ]	ap [ɐp]	at [ɐt]	ak [ɐk]
ea [ɛ]					eang [ɛŋ]			eak [ɛk]
	ei [ei]				eng [eŋ]			ek [ek]
i [i]		iu [iu]	im [im]	in [in]		ip [ip]	it [it]	
o [ɔ]	oi [ɔy]	ou [ou]		on [ɔn]	ong [ɔŋ]		ot [ɔt]	ok [ɔk]
					ung [oŋ]			uk [ok]
uu [u]	uui [uy]			uun [un]			uut [ut]	
eo [œ]	eoi [ɵy]			eon [ɵn]	eong [œŋ]		eot [ɵt]	eok [œk]
y [y]				yn [yn]			yt [yt]	
			m [m̩]		ng [ŋ̍]			

- The finals m and ng can only be used as standalone nasal syllables.

=== Tones ===
There are nine normal tones in six distinct tone contours and two modified tones in Cantonese.

B–C spelling represents the normal tones using the letters h and r before and after the main vowel of the final as well as spelling changes of certain finals as described below.

Before the vowel of the final, h indicates that the start of the tone is high; after the vowel of the final, h indicates that the tone falls, however a falling contour is also indicated by a change in spelling in some finals: Vi > Vy, Vu > Vw, ng > nq, n > nn, m > mm for example saan "disperse" and shaann "mountain", sou "number" and show "whiskers", sai "small" and shay "west".

Before the vowel of the final, r indicates that the start of the tone is low; after the vowel of the final, r indicates that the tone rises, however a rising contour is also indicated by a change in spelling in some finals: Vi > Ve, Vu > Vo for example sai "small" and sae "wash", sou "number" and soo "count".

The modified tones representing high-flat (高平) and modified mid-rising (高升) when the original tone is not mid-rising are indicated by adding an 'x or v after the end of the syllable. High-register syllables that end in a stop (entering tone) are already considered high-flat and cannot take x.

No.	Description	B–C examples		
1	high-falling	shih	shinn	
2	mid-rising	sir	sirn	
3	mid-flat	si	sin	
4	low-falling	srih	srinn	
5	low-rising	srir	srirn	
6	low-flat	sri	srin	
7	high-entering			shek
8	mid-entering			sit
9	low-entering			srek
10	high-flat	shihx	shinnx	
11	mid-rising modified	shihv	shinnv	

=== Examples ===
Traditional	Simplified	Yale Romanization with tone marks	Barnett–Chao Romanization
廣州話	广州话	gwóng jàu wá	Gworngzhawwraav
粵語	粤语	yuht yúh	jrytjryr
你好	你好	néih hóu	nree xoo
