= John Chalmers (missionary) =

Scottish Protestant missionary in China (1825–1899)

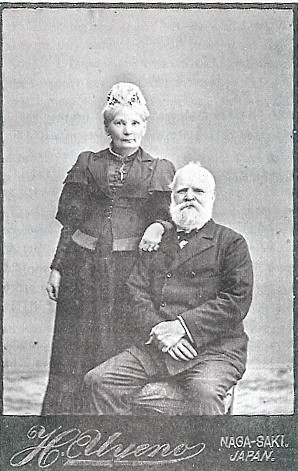
- Chalmers and his wife Helen, taken in Nagasaki
- Born: 24 October 1825; New Deer, Aberdeenshire, Scotland
- Died: 22 November 1899 (aged 74); Incheon, South Korea
- Spouse: Helen Morison (m. 1852; died 1897)

John Chalmers (1825–1899) was a Scottish Protestant missionary in late Qing Dynasty China and translator. His work An English and Cantonese Pocket Dictionary (1859) popularized the term "Cantonese". Before 1859, Cantonese was referred in English as "the Canton dialect".

Chalmers served with the London Missionary Society. He wrote several works on the Chinese language, including, in 1866, the first translation into English of Lao Tzu's Tao Te Ching (which he called the Tau Teh King).

== Works ==
- Chalmers, John (1855). "A Chinese Phonetic Vocabulary, Containing all the most common characters, with their sounds in the Canton Dialect". Hong Kong: London Missionary Society's Press.
- John Chalmers (1859). An English and Cantonese pocket dictionary: for the use of those who wish to learn the spoken language of Canton Province. Printed at the London Missionary Society's Press. p. 159.
- Chalmers, John (1866). Origin of the Chinese. Hong Kong: De Souza & Co.
- John Chalmers (1868). The Speculations on Metaphysics, Polity and Morality of "The Old Philosopher," Lau-tsze. London: Trubner. p. 62.
- John Chalmers (1882). An account of the structure of Chinese characters under 300 primary forms: after the Shwoh-wan, 100 A.D., and the phonetic Shwoh-wan, 1833. Trübner & co. p. 199.
