= Hong Kong Government Cantonese Romanisation =

Romanisation scheme for Chinese characters

The Hong Kong Government uses an unpublished system of romanisation of Cantonese for public purposes. The primary need for romanisation of Cantonese by the Hong Kong Government is in the assigning of names to new streets and places. It has not formally or publicly disclosed its method for determining the appropriate romanisation in any given instance.

== Name and origin ==
The romanisation system in use by the Hong Kong government is called the Government System or the Dyer-Ball/Eitel system, although it contains some features inexplicable by either Ball or Eitel, and furthermore it has varied over time.

== Method ==
Currently, government departments, particularly the Survey and Mapping Office of the Lands Department, consult the Chinese Language Department of the Civil Service Bureau before gazetting names and the latter vet proposed names using the Three Way Chinese Commercial/Telegraphic Code Book, originally published by the Royal Hong Kong Police Force Special Branch for internal government use in 1971. The code book system is devoid of any tone indications and, being grossly simplified, is susceptible to confusion.

Although the code book has only been available for several decades, the Romanisation approach for place names in Hong Kong has been broadly consistent since before 1888. This can be seen in maps of the period and in the government's publication A Gazetteer of Place Names in Hong Kong, Kowloon and the New Territories of 1960.

== Typical features ==
For place names, the type of the place in English is often used instead of a romanisation (e.g., "Street" and "Road" in place of "Kai" (街) and "Lo" (路)). Nevertheless, exceptions are not uncommon (for example, "Fong" in "Lan Kwai Fong", meaning "Square" if translated). "Wan" for "Bay" and "Tsuen" (or "Chuen") for "Estate" (or "Village") are also common. There are also many instances of surviving pre-1888 Romanisation, such as "Kowloon", "Un Chau Street", and "Hong Kong" itself, which would be "Kau Lung", "Yuen Chau Street", and "Heung Kong" under this system, respectively.

Romanisation of names is mandatory in government identification documents such as identity cards issued by the Registration of Persons Office. This standard is used by the office by default though individuals are at liberty to choose their own spelling or another romanisation system.

== Spelling ==
All tones are omitted as are distinctions between aspirated and unaspirated stops. The distinctions between the long vowel [a] and the short vowel [ɐ] are omitted like Fat (發, [fat]; meaning "to issue") and Fat (佛, [fɐt]; meaning "Buddha").

Some of the inconsistencies are due to a distinction that has been lost historically (a distinction between palatal and alveolar sounds, viz. ch versus ts, sh versus s, and j versus z). These consonants are no longer distinguished in present-day speech.

The following table of geographical names illustrates the standard.

=== Consonants ===
Initials

IPA	Yale	Jyutping	HKG	Example	in Chinese
pʰ	p	p	p	Sai Ying Pun	西營盤
p	b	b	p	Po Lam	寶琳
tʰ	t	t	t	Tuen Mun	屯門
t	d	d	t	Tai O	大澳
kʰ	k	k	k	Kai Tak	啟德
k	g	g	k	Tai Kok Tsui	大角咀
kʰw	kw	kw	kw	Kwai Chung	葵涌
kw	gw	gw	kw	Cha Kwo Ling	茶果嶺
m	m	m	m	Yau Ma Tei	油麻地
n	n	n	n	Nam Cheong	南昌
ŋ	ng	ng	ng	Ngau Tau Kok	牛頭角
l	l	l	l	Lam Tin	藍田
f	f	f	f	Fo Tan	火炭
s	s	s	s	So Kon Po	掃捍埔
s	s	s	sh	Shau Kei Wan	筲箕灣
h	h	h	h	Hang Hau	坑口
j	y	j	y	Yau Tong	油塘
w	w	w	w	Wong Tai Sin	黃大仙
tsʰ/tʃʰ	ch	c	ch	Heng Fa Chuen	杏花邨
tsʰ	ch	c	ts	Yau Yat Tsuen	又一村
ts	j	z	ts	Tsim Sha Tsui	尖沙咀

Finals

IPA	Yale	Jyutping	HKG	Example	in Chinese
-p	-p	-p	-p	Ap Lei Chau	鴨脷洲
-t	-t	-t	-t	Tsat Tsz Mui	七姊妹
-k	-k	-k	-k	Shek O	石澳
-m	-m	-m	-m	Sham Shui Po	深水埗
-n	-n	-n	-n	Tsuen Wan	荃灣
-ŋ	-ng	-ng	-ng	Tsing Yi	青衣

=== Vowels, diphthongs, and syllabic consonants ===
IPA	Yale	Jyutping	HKG	Example	in Chinese
aː	aa	aa	a	Ma Tau Wai	馬頭圍
aː	aa	aa	ah	Wah Fu Estate	華富邨
ɐ	a	a	a	Tsz Wan Shan	慈雲山
ɐ	a	a	o	Hung Hom	紅磡
ɐ	a	a	u	Sham Chun River	深圳河
ɛː/e	e	e	e	Chek Lap Kok	赤鱲角
iː/ɪ	i	i	i	Lai Chi Kok	荔枝角
iː/ɪ	i	i	ze	Sheung Sze Wan	相思灣
iː/ɪ	i	i	z	Tung Tsz	洞梓
iː/ɪ	i	i	ee	Tat Chee Avenue	達之路
ɔː/o	o	o	o	Wo Che	禾輋
uː/ʊ	u	u	u	Che Kung Miu	車公廟
uː/ʊ	u	u	wu	Kwu Tung	古洞
uː/ʊ	u	u	oo	Mei Foo	美孚
œː	eu	oe	eu	Sheung Wan	上環
œː	eu	oe	eo	Nam Cheong Street	南昌街
ɵ	eu	eo	u	Shun Lee Estate	順利邨
yː	yu	yu	yu	Yu Chau Street	汝州街
yː	yu	yu	u	Kau U Fong	九如坊
yː	yu	yu	ue	Yung Shue Wan	榕樹灣
aːi	aai	aai	ai	Chai Wan	柴灣
ɐi	ai	ai	ai	Mai Po	米埔
aːu	aau	aau	au	Shau Kei Wan	筲箕灣
ɐu	au	au	au	Sau Mau Ping	秀茂坪
ei	ei	ei	ei	Lei Yue Mun	鯉魚門
ei	ei	ei	ee	Lee On	利安
ei	ei	ei	ay	Kam Hay Court	錦禧苑
ei	ei	ei	ai	Shui Hau Sai Ngan Ma	水口四眼馬
ei	ei	ei	i	To Li Terrace	桃李台
iːu	iu	iu	iu	Siu Sai Wan	小西灣
ɔːy	oi	oi	oi	Choi Hung Estate	彩虹邨
ɔːy	oi	oi	oy	Choy Yee Bridge	蔡意橋
uːy	ui	ui	ui	Pui O	貝澳
ɵy	eui	eoi	ui	Ma Liu Shui	馬料水
ou	ou	ou	o	Tai Mo Shan	大帽山
m̩	m	m			
ŋ̍	ng	ng	ng	Ng Fan Chau	五分州

- The standard pronunciation of 五 is [ŋ̍]. However, a more common pronunciation in Hong Kong is [m̩] and many [ŋ̍] words are merging with it. The only word that was originally pronounced as m̩ is "唔" (not) and it is not used in place names.

== See also ==
- List of common Chinese surnames shows how they are romanised in this scheme.
- Macau Government Cantonese Romanization
- Standard Romanization
- Jyutping
