= Sidney Lau romanisation =

Romanisation system for Cantonese

Sidney Lau romanisation is a system of romanisation for Cantonese that was developed in the 1970s by Sidney Lau for Cantonese textbooks, glossaries, and dictionary.

== Innovation ==
Lau's romanisation indicates tonality with superscript numbers, so no diacritics are required. He uses an English style of writing the vowels, as had some romanizations before him. His system was a plain attempt at simplification which proved popular with western learners of Cantonese as a second language and was initially the system of romanisation adopted by the University of Hong Kong. However, the university now employs the Jyutping system for its Cantonese courses.

== Initials ==
b /p/ 巴	p /pʰ/ 怕	m /m/ 媽	f /f/ 花	
d /t/ 打	t /tʰ/ 他	n /n/ 那		l /l/ 啦
g /k/ 家	k /kʰ/ 卡	ng /ŋ/ 牙	h /h/ 蝦	
gw /kʷ/ 瓜	kw /kʷʰ/ 誇			w /w/ 蛙
j /ts/ 渣	ch /tsʰ/ 叉		s /s/ 沙	y /j/ 也

== Finals ==
In his system, Lau treats /ɵ/ and /o/ as allophones of one phoneme represented with "u", while they are often respectively regarded as allophones of /œ:/ and /u:/ in other systems.

		Coda								
		∅	/i/	/u/	/m/	/n/	/ŋ/	/p̚/	/t̚/	/k̚/
Vowel	/aː/	a /aː/ 沙	aai /aːi̯/ 徙	aau /aːu̯/ 梢	aam /aːm/ 三	aan /aːn/ 山	aang /aːŋ/ 坑	aap /aːp̚/ 圾	aat /aːt̚/ 剎	aak /aːk̚/ 客
Vowel	/ɐ/		ai /ɐi̯/ 西	au /ɐu̯/ 收	am /ɐm/ 心	an /ɐn/ 新	ang /ɐŋ/ 笙	ap /ɐp̚/ 濕	at /ɐt̚/ 失	ak /ɐk̚/ 塞
Vowel	/ɛː/ /e/	e /ɛː/ 些	ei /ei̯/ 四				eng /ɛːŋ/ 鄭			ek /ɛːk̚/ 石
Vowel	/iː/	i /iː/ 詩		iu /iːu̯/ 消	im /iːm/ 閃	in /iːn/ 先	ing /eŋ/ 星	ip /iːp̚/ 攝	it /iːt̚/ 洩	ik /ek̚/ 識
Vowel	/ɔː/	oh /ɔː/ 疏	oi /ɔːy̯/ 開	o /ou̯/ 蘇		on /ɔːn/ 看	ong /ɔːŋ/ 康		ot /ɔːt̚/ 喝	ok /ɔːk̚/ 索
Vowel	/uː/	oo /uː/ 夫	ooi /uːy̯/ 灰			oon /uːn/ 寬			oot /uːt̚/ 闊	
Vowel	/ɵ/ /ʊ/		ui /ɵy̯/ 需			un /ɵn/ 詢	ung /ʊŋ/ 鬆		ut /ɵt̚/ 摔	uk /ʊk̚/ 叔
Vowel	/œː/	euh /œː/ 靴					eung /œːŋ/ 商			euk /œːk̚/ 削
Vowel	/yː/	ue /yː/ 書				uen /yːn/ 孫			uet /yːt̚/ 雪	
Vowel	∅				m /m̩/ 唔		ng /ŋ̍/ 五			

== Tones ==
Tone symbol	Tone description	Example		
Tone symbol	Tone description	Romanization	Word	Meaning
1° or N°	high flat	si^{1}°	詩	poem
1° or N°	high flat	ga^{1} je^{2}°	家姐	elder sister
1	high falling	tim^{1}	添	final particle expressing the idea of addition or regret.
2 or N*	mid rising	si^{2}	史	history
2 or N*	mid rising	dik^{1} si^{6}*	的士	taxi
3	mid flat	si^{3}	試	try
4	low falling	si^{4}	時	time
5	low rising	si^{5}	市	city
6	low flat	si^{6}	是	is

1° indicates the high flat tone. If ° appears after any other tones, it signifies a changed tone and that the word is to be pronounced as 1°, but 1° is not the original/normal tone of the word. Similar to °, if * appears after any tones apart from tone 2, it indicates that the word is to be pronounced as tone 2, but tone 2 is not the original/normal tone of the word. When the asterisk and small circle are applied to a superscript number, they are not superscripted further.

== See also ==
- Comparison of Cantonese transcription systems
