= Yale romanization of Cantonese =

Romanization scheme for Cantonese Chinese

Yale
- Traditional Chinese: 耶魯
- Simplified Chinese: 耶鲁
- Cantonese Yale: Yèh-lóuh
Transcriptions
Standard Mandarin
- Hanyu Pinyin: Yélǔ or Yélǔ
Yue: Cantonese
- Yale Romanization: Yèh-lóuh
- Jyutping: Je4lou5
- IPA: [jɛ˩.lɔw˩˧]

The Yale romanization of Cantonese was developed by Yale scholar Gerard P. Kok for his and Parker Po-fei Huang's textbook Speak Cantonese initially circulated in looseleaf form in 1952 but later published in 1958. Unlike the Yale romanization of Mandarin, it is still widely used in books and dictionaries, especially for foreign learners of Cantonese. It shares some similarities with Hanyu Pinyin in that unvoiced, unaspirated consonants are represented by letters traditionally used in English and most other European languages to represent voiced sounds. For example, [p] is represented as b in Yale, whereas its aspirated counterpart, [pʰ] is represented as p. Students attending the Chinese University of Hong Kong's New-Asia Yale-in-China Chinese Language Center are taught using Yale romanization.

Some enthusiasts employ Yale romanisation to explore writing Cantonese as an alphabetic language.

== Initials ==
b [p] 巴	p [pʰ] 怕	m [m] 媽	f [f] 花	
d [t] 打	t [tʰ] 他	n [n] 那		l [l] 啦
g [k] 家	k [kʰ] 卡	ng [ŋ] 牙	h [h] 蝦	
gw [kʷ] 瓜	kw [kʷʰ] 誇			w [w] 蛙
j [ts] 渣	ch [tsʰ] 叉		s [s] 沙	y [j] 也

== Finals ==
a [aː] 沙	aai [aːi̯] 晒	aau [aːu̯] 筲	aam [aːm] 三	aan [aːn] 山	aang [aːŋ] 省	aap [aːp̚] 圾	aat [aːt̚] 殺	aak [aːk̚] 客
	ai [ɐi̯] 西	au [ɐu̯] 收	am [ɐm] 心	an [ɐn] 新	ang [ɐŋ] 生	ap [ɐp̚] 十	at [ɐt̚] 失	ak [ɐk̚] 塞
e [ɛː] 些	ei [ei̯] 四				eng [ɛːŋ] 聲			ek [ɛːk̚] 石
i [iː] 司		iu [iːu̯] 消	im [iːm] 閃	in [iːn] 先	ing [ɪŋ] 星	ip [iːp̚] 攝	it [iːt̚] 舌	ik [ɪk̚] 色
o [ɔː] 蔬	oi [ɔːy̯] 鰓	ou [ou̯] 酥		on [ɔːn] 看	ong [ɔːŋ] 康		ot [ɔːt̚] 割	ok [ɔːk̚] 各
u [uː] 夫	ui [uːy̯] 灰			un [uːn] 寬	ung [ʊŋ] 風		ut [uːt̚] 闊	uk [ʊk̚] 福
eu [œː] 靴	eui [ɵy̯] 去			eun [ɵn] 信	eung [œːŋ] 上		eut [ɵt̚] 摔	euk [œːk̚] 削
yu [yː] 書				yun [yːn] 孫			yut [yːt̚] 雪	
			m [m̩] 唔		ng [ŋ̍] 吳			

- Only the finals m and ng can be used as standalone nasal syllables.

== Tones ==
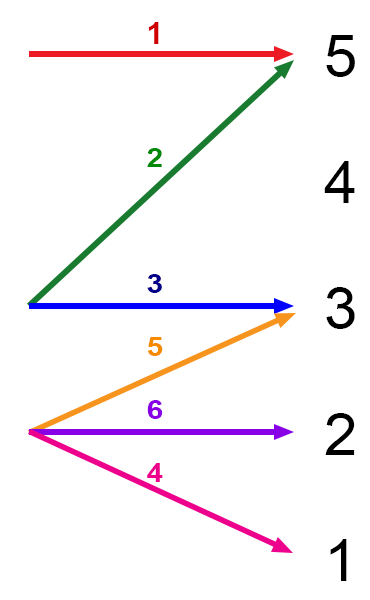
Graphical representation of the tones of six-tone Cantonese.

Modern Cantonese has up to seven phonemic tones. Cantonese Yale represents these tones using a combination of diacritics and the letter h. Traditional Chinese linguistics treats the tones in syllables ending with a stop consonant as separate "entering tones". Cantonese Yale follows modern linguistic conventions in treating these the same as the high-flat, mid-flat and low-flat tones, respectively.

No.	Description	IPA & Chao tone numbers	Yale representation		
1	high-flat	˥ 55	sī	sīn	sīk
1	high-falling	˥˨ 52	sì	sìn	
2	mid-rising	˧˥ 35	sí	sín	
3	mid-flat	˧ 33	si	sin	sik
4	low-falling	˨˩ 21	sìh	sìhn	
5	low-rising	˨˧ 23	síh	síhn	
6	low-flat	˨ 22	sih	sihn	sihk

== Examples ==
Traditional	Simplified	Romanization
廣州話	广州话	gwóng jāu wá
粵語	粤语	yuht yúh
你好		néih hóu

Sample transcription of one of the 300 Tang Poems by Meng Haoran:

春曉 孟浩然	Chèun híu Maahng Houh-yìhn
春眠不覺曉，	Chèun mìhn bāt gok híu,
處處聞啼鳥。	chyu chyu màhn tàih níuh.
夜來風雨聲，	Yeh lòih fùng yúh sìng,
花落知多少？	fà lohk jì dò síu?

Note concerning the jì in the last line of the poem that it is pronounced as high flat here because immediately followed by a tone that begins high and yet that this Romanization's conventions mark it nonetheless as high falling, and the user then needs to remember this rule of tone-sandhi. (Interested readers can confirm this convention by looking at for instance the dictionary by Kwan Choi Wah among the works in the list at bottom below.)

== See also ==
- Cantonese phonology
- Jyutping
- Guangdong Romanization
- ILE romanization of Cantonese
- Sidney Lau romanisation
- S. L. Wong (phonetic symbols)
- Barnett–Chao Romanisation
- Yale romanization of Mandarin
- Yale romanization of Korean
