= Filipino NGOs in Hong Kong =

Filipino non-governmental organisations (NGOs) in Hong Kong were founded by both the Filipinos and the local Chinese who aim to assist and serve the Filipino community. There are mainly three types of Filipino NGOs in Hong Kong: social justice NGOs, recreational NGOs, and religious NGOs.

== Social background ==
According to the Hong Kong 2006 Population By-census, among the 5% of non-Chinese population in Hong Kong, 41.4% of them are Filipinos, comprising a population of 140,000. Many Filipinos in Hong Kong are often associated with domestic work, which renders their community and recreational life invisible.

== Types of NGOs ==
=== Social Justice NGOs ===
Social justice NGOs play a significant role in fighting for the rights of Filipinos living in Hong Kong as a minority population. They serve to provide humanitarian aid to the migrant Filipinos.

==== Social Justice NGOs organised by Filipinos ====
The United Filipinos in Hong Kong (UNIFIL-HK)

An alliance group helping overseas Filipino migrants, the United Filipinos in Hong Kong (UNIFIL-HK) was established on 12 May 1985. It acts as a platform for migrant Filipinos in Hong Kong to unite and to raise their awareness on social migrant problems. It also puts much effort on fund-raising campaigns so as to help people who live in devastated regions in the Philippines, such as Marikina City and Laguna province. The organisation emphasises the importance of co-operation with different local and international Filipino NGOs, such as The Mission for Filipino Migrant Workers (HK) Society (MFMW), the Bethune House Migrant Women's Refuge (BH), and the Asia Pacific Mission for Migrant Filipinos (APMMF). Through interaction and negotiation with other NGOs, it can organise large campaigns related to different social issues.

The Mission for Filipino Migrant Workers (MFMW)

The Mission for Filipino Migrant Workers (MFMW), established on 3 March 1981, is a significant institution that assists Filipinos in Hong Kong in striving toward their social welfare. It was founded by the National Council of Churches in the Philippines(NCCP) and several religious groups in Hong Kong. Its funding sources are usually from local and foreign donations, as well as yearly fund-raising campaigns. The main objective of the MFMW is to assist Filipinos in Hong Kong, especially those who work as domestic workers, in striving for rights in social justice affairs by intervention and prevention. For instance, it showed its discontent towards a decision on cutting the wages of foreign domestic workers by Hong Kong government in 2003. Thus, it described itself as empowerment-oriented and migrant-based.

==== Social Justice NGOs organised by Non-Filipinos ====
This is a local NGO that provides service and assistance by setting up ministry that helps ethnic minority groups, especially Filipinos in Hong Kong. International Social Service Hong Kong Branch, established in January 1972, is a division from worldwide departments. Its major aim is to help workers of ethnic minority groups and their families to adapt their lives in Hong Kong. The branch held a memorial ceremony in Wan Chai after the 2010 "Manila Incident" involving Hong Kong tourists held hostage and killed in Manila. The memorial ceremony helped Filipinos living in Hong Kong to grieve for the victims.

=== Recreational NGOs ===
Filipinos migrants in Hong Kong are often associated with domestic work, but in fact, there are vibrant recreational activities engaged by the Filipino migrants.

==== Recreational NGOs organised by Filipinos ====
Hong Kong Musicians Union

In 1948, with the growing numbers of Filipino musicians in Hong Kong, the Hong Kong Musicians Union (HKMU) was established. It was founded by British musician Pete O’Neil, then followed by Filipino musician Andy Hidalgo and this has been the norm ever since. The musicians rented flats in Hillwood Road, Tsim Sha Tsui, for musical jam sessions to explore and improve their music skills until they were able to purchase a Union House in Mirador Mansion in 1957. They would meet at the Filipino Club in Tsim Sha Tsui for general assemblies. HKMU, in co-ordination with the Philippine Consulate General and the Government of Hong Kong, has been co-organizing an annual Concert in the Park, to celebrate their love for music and promote the city’s vibrant music scene. The event was held in Kowloon Park during its inaugural years, but has since moved to the Piazza of the Hong Kong Cultural Centre.

==== Recreational NGOs organised by Non-Filipinos ====
Hong Kong Philippine Kali Association

Founded in 1998 by Fong Wing Hong, Hong Kong Philippine Kali Association is aimed at promoting the traditional Filipino martial arts, which are fighting with sticks, blades, and improvised weapons. In addition, the association provides adolescents with training courses, helping them to learn self-defense, self-confidence, self-discipline, respect for others, and to serve the community.

=== Religious NGOs ===
There are a number of Filipino NGOs in Hong Kong founded by both Filipinos and non-Filipinos on their religious background, such as Catholic, Christian, and Muslim associations that serve the Filipinos' religious interests.

==== Religious NGOs organised by Filipinos ====
The Filipino Catholic Association (FCA)

Among the religious NGOs that are founded by Filipinos, the Filipino Catholic Association (FCA) which is located at the Kowloon Rosary Church has the longest history. It was established on 8 April 1958, appointed by Lawrence Bianchi, Bishop of Hong Kong at the time. All Filipino Catholics are welcome to join the FCA. Its objective is to preserve faiths of members and to encourage them to share their blessings with others by charity and mercy works. Monthly meetings, celebrations, choir, and visits to sick members are regularly held by the FCA. The FCA also requests its members to attend obsequies for the deceased.

Jesus Is Lord Church (JIL Church)

Jesus Is Lord Church (JIL Church) is a Christian organisation that originates in the Philippines. In Hong Kong, there are nine JIL Churches located at Sham Shui Po, Wan Chai, Central, North Point, Discovery Bay, Yuen Long, Tsuen Wan, Sai Kung and Stanley respectively.

Muslim Filipino Association (MUSFILA)

Muslim Filipino Association (MUSFILA) engages in numbers of political movements, for example the organisation participated in a march to the US Consulate to protest against war in Gaza in 2008.

==== Religious NGOs organised by Non-Filipinos ====
Some religious organisations in Hong Kong also set up Filipino ministries to serve Filipinos in Hong Kong particularly, for example the International Christian Assembly (ICA) Hong Kong. St Anne’s Church has a division named the St. Anne’s Filipino Catholic Group in Hong Kong. The Group organises activities like prayer group, choir, home visitations, retreat, and pilgrimage for believers. It also joined the "Hand to Hand, Heart to Heart, Door to Door" program to collect donations, clothes, stationeries, toys and canned food for the needy in the Philippines in 2009.

=== Others ===
Philippine Association of Hong Kong

Established in 1961, the organisation is run by officials of different nationalities. People with business and social interests are its main target members. On one hand, it emphasises on charity involvement. On the other hand, it devotes itself to promotion of Philippine trade and investment. Thus, it serves as a multi-purpose NGO with officials from multiple countries.

== Interaction with local Hong Kong people ==
=== The Manila Incident ===
On 23 August 2010, there was a hostage-taking incident in Manila, the capital city of the Philippines. Eight Hong Kong citizens were killed by a Philippine ex-policeman, Rolando Mendoza. A praying for the victims was organised by the Consulate General of the Philippines in Hong Kong with the Catholic Diocese of Hong Kong. Filipino Migrant Workers’ Union cooperated with some local organisations to hold a blessing section on 29 August, for Filipinos to pray and read Bible together.

=== Chip Tsao Incident ===
On 27 March 2009, Chip Tsao, a Hong Kong writer, wrote an essay titled 'The War at Home' which was publicised in a free magazine called "HK magazine". He claimed that the Philippines alleged her sovereignty of Spratly Islands and he described the Philippines as the 'nation of servants'. Chip Tsao’s essay had caused discontentment among many Filipino organisations. Some Filipino NGOs e.g. UNFIL-HK organised a march with over 2000 Filipinos participated, protesting against Tsao’s essay. They considered Tsao’s essay as a ‘racist essay’. They also called for more attention to racism and discrimination in Hong Kong.

=== Demonstration ===
The Philippine Government imposed a mandatory insurance on the hiring of Filipino domestic helpers. The Filipino domestic workers in Hong Kong were worried that might reduce their competitiveness towards the workers from the other countries, thus they demonstrated outside the Philippine Consulate on 9 November 2010. Filipinos also joined some demonstrations on different issues in Hong Kong, such as anti-article 23 and the legislation of minimum wage.

== Media ==
The SUN (newspaper), Hong Kong News, (no longer in circulation) HKPinoyTV (online video news) and The Mission For Migrant Workers (MFMW) (Newsletter and magazine) are the main sources of Filipino media accessible in Hong Kong.

One of the first Filipino newspapers to be published in Hong Kong, and the first to be given away free, is The SUN Hong Kong, founded in 1995 by veteran journalists Leo A. Deocadiz (publisher) and Atty. Daisy CL Mandap (editor). Both worked in major media outlets in the Philippines and in Hong Kong, including The Standard (previously Hong Kong Standard) SCMP, Asia Television HK and CNN Hong Kong before setting up The SUN. Originally published as a bi-monthly newspaper, The SUN was printing 55,000 copies at its peak, which meant a copy for every four Filipinos in Hong Kong. It also published separate editions in Macau and Toronto for a time. In the early 2000s it published its articles online, the first Filipino media publication in Hong Kong to do so. It later migrated its contents to a new website, www.sunwebhk.com which remains to this day. Throughout its long history of service to the Filipino community in Hong Kong, The SUN has received many major awards, including the HK Chief Executive Commendation for Community Service, the University of the Philippines Distinguished Alumna Award for Public Service and the UP Mass Communication Medal of Distinction for Atty Mandap. One of The SUN's advocacies is the empowerment of Filipino migrant workers, and in line with this, trained many of them to become news writers and eventually, leaders of their own community organizations. As Board member of the charity group Kasambuhay, Mr Deocadiz also spearheaded financial literacy and business development education for migrant domestic workers. Individually, The SUN founders undertook many projects that benefited the Filipino community as a whole, and the migrant community in particular. As chairpersons of the Philippine Association of Hong Kong in 2003 and 2005 respectively, they undertook numerous fundraisers, including concerts and charity balls as well as sporting events, to raise money for charity. One of their biggest beneficiaries is the Bethune House Migrant Women's Refuge, which provides shelter, accommodation, legal and psychological assistance to migrant women in distress. In their personal capacity they also funded the university education of a number of scholars, including children of migrant workers in Hong Kong. One of them is now a doctor, having obtained her medical degree from the University of the Philippines which Atty Mandap and Mr Deocadiz both attended. They were also instrumental in securing right of abode for a number of children born to migrant worker parents in Hong Kong, before the Court of Final Appeal plugged this legal entry point in 2013. The SUN ceased printing copies of its newspaper in 2020, in the wake of the turmoil sparked by pro-democracy protests, and subsequently, the Covid-19 pandemic. However, it continues to publish daily contents on its website and Facebook page, The SUN Hong Kong.

Amidst the advent of mobile devices and the impending dominance of social video as a media platform, HKPinoyTV was launched four years ago with a vision to provide free high definition original content video news service to the Filipino community in Hong Kong. It is currently operated and maintained by professional broadcast journalists as a public service. With a region leading 88.3% smartphone penetration in Hong Kong (eMarketer 2015), HKPinoyTV's mobile-friendly media delivery platform is always accessible (24/7) to the mobile device equipped and social media savvy overseas Filipinos. With more than 170,000 Filipino workers and residents, relevant news and interesting stories abound in Hong Kong. With informative content standing on a solid online platform, HKPinoyTV redefines the media landscape for the Filipinos in Hong Kong.

The Mission For Migrant Workers (MFMW) also publishes monthly newsletter called the New Migrant Focus and the Migrant Focus Magazine.
