= Indonesians in Hong Kong =

Indonesians in Hong Kong 在港印尼人
Orang Indonesia di Hong Kong
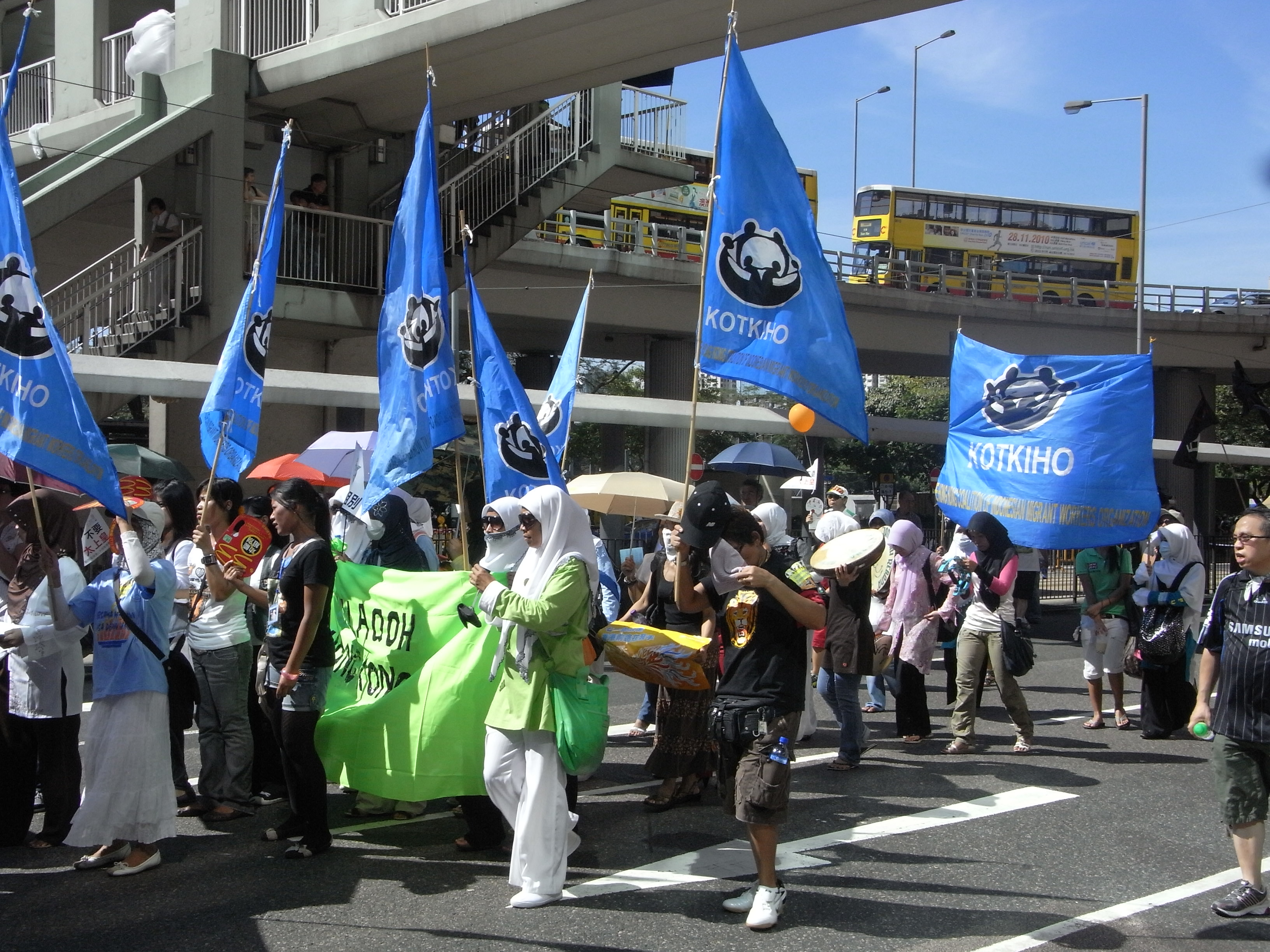
- A group of Indonesian migrant workers participated in Hong Kong 1 July marches rally.

Total population
- 165,750 (2015)

Regions with significant populations
- Causeway Bay, Kowloon, Wan Chai, Central

Languages
- Indonesian, Javanese, Sundanese, Cantonese, English, others

Religion
- Sunni Islam (majority), Christianity and other religions

Related ethnic groups
- Various ethnic groups in Indonesia

Indonesians in Hong Kong
- Traditional Chinese: 在港印尼人
Transcriptions
Standard Mandarin
- Hanyu Pinyin: Zài gǎng yìnní rén
Yue: Cantonese
- Yale Romanization: Zhóigóng Yanneiyàhn
- Jyutping: zoi6 gong2 jan3 nei4 jan4

Indonesians in Hong Kong (Indonesian: Orang Indonesia di Hong Kong), numbering 102,100, form the second-largest ethnic minority group in the territory, behind Filipinos. Most Indonesians coming to Hong Kong today are those who arrive under limited-term contracts for employment as foreign domestic helpers. The Hong Kong Immigration Department allows the Indonesian consulate to force Indonesian domestic helpers to use employment agencies. Indonesian migrant workers in Hong Kong comprise 2.4% of all overseas Indonesian workers. Among the Indonesian population is a group of Chinese Indonesians, many of them finding refuge in Hong Kong after the civil persecution of them.

== Employment ==
In 2006, it was estimated that 102,100 Indonesians worked in Hong Kong, of whom between 80 and 90% are estimated to be women. This represents a growth of almost 250% from the 41,000 recorded six years earlier, while during the same period, the number of domestic helpers from the Philippines declined. Some newspaper reports attributed this to the fact that Filipinas were "harder to manage", and additionally to the better training of Indonesian domestic helpers. Employment agencies in Indonesia sending workers to Hong Kong typically provide at least three to six months of training in household work, including a basic course in Cantonese, whereas similar agencies in the Philippines provide only fourteen days of training. The Employment agencies in Indonesia also work together with agencies in Hong Kong to extract higher fees from Indonesians after they start working in Hong Kong. Part of this extra fee is the money that agencies pay to women in Indonesia to start the migration process. The fees owed by the workers for training and housing are non-negotiable and usually figure as four to seven months of salary deduction (HK$21,000 or US$2,709). Indonesian domestic helpers in Hong Kong are represented by two unions, the Indonesian Migrant Workers Union (IMWU) and Coalition of Indonesian Migrant Workers' Organisations (Koalisi Organisasi Tenaga Kerja Indonesia Hong Kong, KOTKIHO).

According to organisations representing migrant workers, police intimidation of migrant workers is also a problem. Underpayment of wages and employer abuse is also a problem; Indonesian workers are widely paid as little as HK$1800 to HK$2000 per month. During the May 1998 riots in Jakarta, the Hong Kong government threatened to expel Indonesian labourers in Hong Kong in response to the Indonesian government's inaction on crimes committed against ethnic Chinese women; however, in the end, they did not act on this threat.

== Pre-migration experience ==
Pre-migration experience for inductees into the domestic labor migration system involves overcrowding, shortage of food and facilities, abuse, and exploitation because the minimum standard regulation of the training centers set by the Indonesian Labour Department are not enforced. The camps in which the young women migrants are made to stay for the duration of their training also double as a system of incarceration. Following the period of training, the workers will spend up to a few years indefinitely detained until a job offer is made in order to prevent pregnancy and ensure that workers will be available when jobs are requested.

The living conditions in the centers are very poor. Women are made to sleep on the floor packed tightly against each other, and only one bucket of water is afforded per person for bathing. There is little medical care for the health problems that result from these conditions, and physical and sexual abuse is a prevailing reality. Even the trip from home to the migration center often involves being sexually abused by the training center recruiter.

== Remittances and savings ==
Indonesians in Hong Kong send remittances less frequently than Indonesians in Japan and Singapore, or Filipinos in Hong Kong; they were also somewhat less likely than Filipinos to use a bank to send such remittances, instead relying on friends, remittance networks such as Alipay or other informal networks such as hawala. Contrary to the trend in Latin America, where remittances from relatives working in the United States are often used to meet daily expenses or for other consumption, in one 2005 survey, more than half of Indonesian workers in Hong Kong reported that their families used their remittances to start businesses, each creating between one and five jobs.

== Religion ==
In 2009, there were 220,000 Muslims in Hong Kong, of which Indonesians formed an estimated 120,000.

Within their communities, services are provided to Indonesian Muslims and other Muslims mainly by NGOs. Most of these NGOs have courses in Arabic and the Quran so that children and newly Muslim people can learn the religion practices and language they need. There are seven Islamic schools in Hong Kong, run mainly by Islamic NGOs, for example the Chinese Muslim Cultural and Fraternal Association. Some of them have membership schemes and provide services like library, retails, etc. Some of the people also gather in the Mosques during religious celebrations. If they seem to mainly interact within their own local communities, it is because their social values and moral standards are different from mainstream Hong Kong culture.

== Notable people ==
- Lo Lieh, actor
- Melvis, Elvis impersonator
- Ng Ka Long, badminton player
- Wong Wing Ki, badminton player

== See also ==
- Demographics of Indonesia
- Hong Kong-Indonesia relations
