= Thomas Chan Tin Chi =

Hong Kong entrepreneur and investor

- 陳天賜
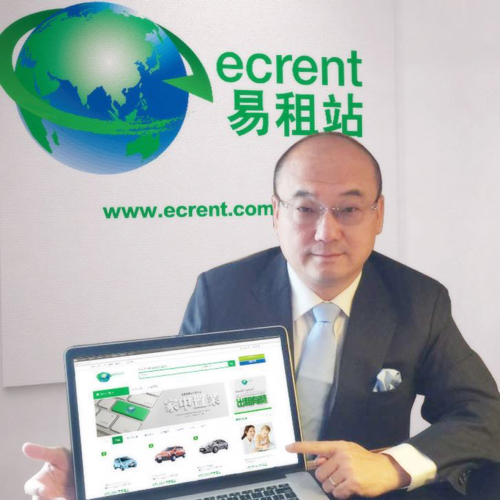
- Born: 1966 (age 59–60)
- Citizenship: Hong Kong
- Education: Tsinghua University; University of Wales

Thomas Chan Tin Chi (陳天賜; born 1966) is a Hong Kong entrepreneur and investor.

== Early life and automobile career ==
Chan was born in 1966 and received his primary education in Quanzhou, Fujian. He immigrated to Hong Kong from Fujian in 1979 and attended Pui Kiu Middle School in Hong Kong. He worked as a storeman in the automobile industry and eventually founded his own car dealership, specializing in second hand cars.

He became known as the "king of second hand cars" of Hong Kong and was named one of The Ten Outstanding Young Persons of Hong Kong of 1995 at the age of 29. He was the youngest person to be given this award.

== Investor career ==
Chan suffered heavy losses in the 1997 Asian financial crisis and was declared bankrupt in 2001. In 2003, he worked with Hong Kong property tycoon David C. Lee on construction contracts in mainland China, and also acquired a substantial share of Lee's accountancy firm. However, Chan was accused of putting shareholder power-play above the interests of dismissed employees when the accountancy firm liquidated in 2006.

After the period of bankruptcy expired in 2005, he returned to entrepreneurship and founded ECrent with his wife. ECrent is an online platform for the rental of household objects. In March 2015, ECrent mounted a covert takeover bid of the failing television channel ATV but was ultimately unsuccessful.

His business interests include both equity acquisitions and providing operational advisory to companies. His equity investment portfolio covers cross-regional enterprise such as HSBC, Alibaba, Amazon, Google, etc. In addition, he also invests in properties at international locations. He also invests in gold and expensive metal markets.

== Personal life ==
Chan maintains a family fund to invest into both enterprise and startup companies. He has special interests also with jewelries, oil paintings, and wine.

In December 2015, a burglar attempted to raid Chan's private mansion in Hong Kong. Chan alerted the police and the burglar was arrested.
