= Come On, James =

Internet meme from Hong Kong

"Come On, James" is a viral internet meme and internet slang phrase in Hong Kong. The quote originates from a fictional satire piece, "Four-Year Curriculum of University", written by famous columnist Chip Tsao and published in the newspaper Apple Daily in 2004. The meme has since been adapted into a number of derivative creations, including a viral video and a musical parody on YouTube. It has also become an internet slang phrase widely used by Hong Kong netizens. "Come On, James" refers to both Tsao's satirical column and the quote itself.

== Background ==
The phrase "Come On, James" originates from the satirical piece, "Four-Year Curriculum of University", by famous columnist Chip Tsao, published in the newspaper Apple Daily on 25 October 2004. In the article, Tsao mocked the reformed tertiary-education-system – the 334 Scheme (Note: Under the reformed education system, the Hong Kong Certificate of Education Examination (HKCEE) and Hong Kong Advanced Level Examination are abolished and replaced by the Hong Kong Diploma of Secondary Education Examination (HKDSE) from 2011. After graduating from secondary school, those who passed the four core subjects and one elective in HKDSE and enrolled in one of the eight universities receiving fundings from the University Grants Committee will receive four years of tertiary education instead of a three-year curriculum offered under the old system. Demand for tertiary education has drastically increased since then, and supply of associate degree courses therefore has multiplied especially ones with very low credibility and recognition. Graduates of community colleges are deemed less competitive, compared to those from the UGC-funded universities by the majority of employers.) – and questioned the credibility of Associate degree courses and community colleges in Hong Kong. The piece became popular after it was shared on the Hong Kong Golden Forum, one of the most frequently read social platforms in the city. The sarcastic phrase "Come On, James" caught the most attention of readers and soon became a viral internet meme.

== Synopsis ==
Tsao aimed to illustrate the problems that the 334 Scheme brought to the education system in Hong Kong. He wrote the article as a short story about a couple breaking up because they went to differently-ranked colleges. In the story, the female character, who was studying in the University of Hong Kong, one of the top universities worldwide euphemistically told her boyfriend, James, that they were drifting away from each other. She blamed James, who went to community college. During the conversation, James' girlfriend quipped, "Come on, James. Can you be more mature?", after James became irritated by her attitude. At the end the story, it was explained that the female character had already gotten a new boyfriend also studying at the University of Hong Kong, with brighter career prospects.

== Analysis ==
Commentators have linked the success of Come On, James to a number of social phenomena in Hong Kong at the time of its publication.

=== Criticism on Education Reform ===
"Come on, James." reflects that the overwhelming number of Associate Degree courses leads to the mere recognition of associate degree in Hong Kong. The reform actually makes the case worse. Those with an Associate degree have relatively dim career prospects, which means that they have fewer chances to be employed.

=== "Kong Girl" Phenomenon ===
"Come on, James." reflects the "Kong Girl" (Note: "Kong Girls" refers to superficial and arrogant girls who may choose boyfriends merely by reviewing their status, positions as well as achievements. "Kong Girls" may commonly use this slang when they try to criticise their boyfriends for failing to buy them luxurious goods.) phenomenon. In the "Come on, James" article, the female character represent a typical "Kong Girl" who looks down on James due to their difference in academic qualification. The girl is described to be materialistic as she had a quarrel with James in the past, just because the girl wanted to travel to Europe, while the boy could not afford it. By code-switching in Cantonese and English, "Kong Girl" always tries to show off their English proficiency. Being self-centered is one of the characteristics of "Kong Girl".

=== Social Hierarchy ===
"Come on, James" reflects the phenomenon of social hierarchy which students were categorised in terms of their social status. On the basis of their potential future income, those who own a degree of law, medicine, or global business are perceived to be on the A-list, but others who do not hold these degrees are usually deemed as losers. In the case of "Come On, James", the new boyfriend of the female character majoring in law was preferred, rather than James who was studying an Associate degree.

=== Political Divide ===
Whether universities in Hong Kong should adopt four-year curriculum or not was part of a debate between the pro-democracy camp and pro-establishment camp. Universities in Hong Kong followed the British system of a three-year curriculum before the 1997 Handover. It sparked a controversy between the two camps since the new four-year curriculum was the same as the system of mainland China's.

== Derivative Works ==
=== Sequels by Chip Tsao ===
Two sequels were published by Chip Tsao in Apple Daily five years later in July 2009, and another six years later in July 2015.

=== Adaptations ===
There are several adaptations of "Come On, James" regarding different subjects including the iPhone 3GS, Bawang Chinese herbal medicine shampoo and Indonesian instant noodles brand Indomie.

=== Video ===
On 18 September 2013, a video based on the storyline of "Four-Year Curriculum of University" was published on the YouTube channel "Open Video". It has received almost 400,000 views by the end of October 2015. The video conveys the main message of the original story, which criticises the drawbacks of four-year tertiary education. The video further depicts the contrasting emotion of two characters. The acting of the male character emphasises that James is disappointed in his girlfriend who breaks their love promise due to the difference of qualifications. The female actress acts out the character's scornful attitude to James.

The original article ends with James being dumped by his girlfriend but the video has a different ending. After several years, the girl is cheated on and broke up with his lawyer boyfriend. She is to order a cake in a café to feel better. She was then dumbfounded that James is the owner of the place and regretted dumping James in the past. A new message is sent that people often superficially mistaken success as money and fame.

=== Musical Parody ===
On 1 August 2015, a musical parody of "Four-Year Curriculum of University", named "COME ON JAMES", was published on the parodic YouTube channel "Sing To Say" and was posted on Hong Kong Golden Forum. It became the top trending music video of Hong Kong in the same month on YouTube. The video of the musical parody had received over 40,000 views as of November 2015. Re-using the melody of "Rashōmon", the Cantonese number-one hit of Hong Kong pop-singer Juno Mak, the parodist reworked the lyrics along the storyline of "Four-Year Curriculum of University". Compared to the oblique conversations between the two characters in the article, the lyrics of the parody come way more straightforward indicating the accusation and ridicule from the girl towards James. Yet, the parody contains more portrayal of the male character, James, lingering in, the relationship with the girl, which is fading away.

=== Internet Slang ===
The idea of "Come on, James" was later transformed into a slang widely used by the young generation in Hong Kong, commonly seen on social platforms which underscores one's self-regarded superiority over the others. In the passage written by Chip Tsao, "Come on, James" is spoken bitterly, sarcastically and disdainfully by a girl who successfully gets into a leading university in Hong Kong yet has got a so-called "unmatched" boyfriend studying in an associate degree program. As the slang carries an ironic tone, it is widely employed by teenagers nowadays when they feel more superior in terms of economic status, academic achievements or appearances etc. than the others.
