= Comilang v Commissioner of Registration =

Legal case in Hong Kong law

Comilang v. Commissioner of Registration
- Court: Court of Appeal, Hong Kong
- Full case name: Milagros Tecson Comilang and Zahrah Noor Ahmed v. Commissioner of Registration, Registration of Persons Tribunal, and Director of Immigration
- Decided: 2 May 2013
- Transcript: text

Case history
- Prior action: HCAL 28/2011

Comilang v. Commissioner of Registration was a 2011–2013 case against the Hong Kong Immigration Department by a former foreign domestic helper (Milagros Tecson Comilang) who is the sole custodial parent of a child (Zahrah Noor Ahmed) who has permanent residence status in Hong Kong. Comilang sought to challenge her own removal from Hong Kong on, inter alia, the grounds that it would effectively force Ahmed to leave Hong Kong and thus deprive her of all of the benefits she should enjoy as a Hong Kong permanent resident. The ruling against the applicants in the Court of First Instance had wider legal significance, as it established that neither the International Covenant on Economic, Social and Cultural Rights nor the Convention on the Rights of the Child are incorporated in Hong Kong law.

The applicants won a minor victory in May 2013 when the Court of Appeal quashed the decision of the Immigration Department denying a visa to Comilang on procedural grounds and ordered fresh consideration of her application for stay; however, this is not likely to result in Comilang's being granted a residence visa, and thus further legal challenges are expected.

== Background ==
The first applicant, Milagros Tecson Comilang, is a native of the Philippines. She came to Hong Kong in 1997 to work as a foreign domestic helper, and continued in that line of work until 13 July 2005. After leaving employment as an FDH, she married Shaker Ahmed, a Pakistani national and Hong Kong permanent resident. Her husband then sponsored her to apply for a dependent visa. In 2006, while her application remained pending, her daughter Zahrah Noor Ahmed (the second applicant) was born. However, the marriage broke down when she discovered that her husband Shaker Ahmed was already married, and Ahmed withdrew his sponsorship of her application.

The Family Court awarded Comilang custody of her daughter; however, the Immigration Department ordered Comilang to depart from Hong Kong. In 2007, Comilang requested leave to seek judicial review against the Immigration Department's order, but Judge Michael Hartmann of the Court of First Instance denied leave. Comilang later applied to the Commissioner of Registration for issuance of an identity card, as well as for permission from the Director of Immigration to extend her stay in Hong Kong, but was refused both times. She appealed to the Registration of Persons Tribunal, which ruled against her in June 2010.

== Court of First Instance ==
Comilang was successful in obtaining leave to seek judicial review against the tribunal's decision. She received Legal Aid and was represented by Daly & Associates, which instructed barrister Gladys Li. Justice Johnson Lam of the Court of First Instance ruled against Comilang in June 2012. One complex legal question partially addressed by Lam's judgment was whether or not the International Covenant on Economic, Social and Cultural Rights is incorporated in Hong Kong law, and to what extent it imposes obligations on the Hong Kong government. In prior cases, most Hong Kong judges had declined to rule on this issue at all; they addressed only the simpler legal question of whether or not a claimant's rights under the ICESCR had been violated, and having found in all such cases that no violation had occurred, they were able to avoid the need to examine the question of incorporation. However, Lam observed (at para. 54):

Even though the ICCPR and ICESCR are given constitutionally [sic] backing in Article 39 of the Basic Law, it is also provided in the same article that these international conventions shall be implemented through the laws of Hong Kong. In other words, they do not by themselves have the force of law. In determining the constitutional obligation on the part of Hong Kong under Article 39 to implement these conventions, one must have regard to the intent of the drafters of the Basic Law.

The Hong Kong Human Rights Monitor, in an August 2012 submission to the United Nations Commission on Human Rights on the implementation of the International Covenant on Civil and Political Rights in Hong Kong, pointed to Lam's ruling as an example which brought into question the Hong Kong government's commitment to preserving family rights under Article 23 of the ICCPR. Lam also noted (at para. 35 et seq.):

On 10 June 1997, the Central Government informed the United Nations' secretary general that the reservations and declarations entered by PRC when it ratified the CRC in 1992 would be applicable to Hong Kong with effect from 1 July 1997. The immigration reservation in the CRC is as follows,

"The Government of the People's Republic of China reserves, for the Hong Kong Special Administrative Region, the right to apply such legislation, in so far as it relates to the entry into, stay in and departure from the Hong Kong Special Administrative Region of those who do not have the right under the laws of the Hong Kong Special Administrative Region, and to the acquisition and possession of residentship as it may deem necessary from time to time." ...

The CRC does not have the force of domestic law in Hong Kong.

In 2013, when the Hong Kong government stated in China's report under the Convention on the Rights of the Child that "The Convention as applied to Hong Kong will be taken into account in the courts of the HKSAR where appropriate", the Hong Kong Bar Association in its own submission to the Committee on the Rights of the Child objected, pointing out that Lam's ruling had recognised that the CRC is not incorporated in Hong Kong law and arguing that the Hong Kong government's statement misrepresented the extent to which domestic legislation takes into account the "best interests of the child".

== Court of Appeal ==
In August 2012, Comilang appealed Lam's decision to the Court of Appeal. The appeal came before Chief Judge Andrew Cheung, Vice-President Frank Stock, and Justice Joseph Fok on 16 April 2013. Comilang brought up several grounds of appeal, but Fok in the unanimous opinion did not deal with most of them. The Court of Appeal allowed Comilang's appeal on the narrow ground that the Immigration Department had dealt with her letter requesting permission to stay in a "fundamentally misconceived" fashion by treating it as an application to remain in Hong Kong as a dependant of her daughter, and rejecting it on that basis because the daughter, who was four years old at the time of the initial application, lacked the economic capacity to support the mother. After this partial victory, Comilang now awaits a fresh decision by the Director of Immigration on her application to remain in Hong Kong.
