= Indonesian migrant workers =

Indonesian Migrant Worker
Pekerja Migran Indonesia Tenaga Kerja Indonesia

Total population
- 4.5 million (2014)

Regions with significant populations
- Malaysia: 107,085
- Taiwan: 68,874
- Saudi Arabia: 38,104
- Hong Kong: 30,208
- Singapore: 25,601
- United Arab Emirates: 15,276

Languages
- Indonesian (national); Indonesian languages, Arabic, English

Religion
- Islam (majority), Christianity

Related ethnic groups
- Indonesians (Indonesian diaspora)

Indonesian migrant workers (Indonesian: Pekerja Migran Indonesia, PMI, formerly known as Tenaga Kerja Indonesia, TKI) are Indonesian citizens who work in countries outside of Indonesia.

Indonesia's population is the world's fourth-largest, and due to a shortage of domestic jobs, many Indonesians seek employment overseas. These migrant workers are mostly low-skilled and work in the domestic sector. They are prone to exploitation, extortion, physical and sexual abuses and human trafficking. Several cases of abuse have been reploted, some of which been picked up by international media.

It is estimated that around 4.5 million Indonesians work abroad. Roughly 70 percent are women, most of whom are employed in domestic sector (as maid or domestic helpers) or in the manufacturing sector. Migrant Indonesian men mostly work on plantations, in the construction or transportation industries or in the service sector. Most Indonesian migrants are in their prime work years, between 18 and 35 years old. However, cases of underage workers attaining employment with the aid of falsified documents have been reported.

Since 1969, the government of Indonesia has administered the recruitment of migrant labor. The public program has attracted criticism, with opponents claiming it unduly elevates the rights of private recruitment agents over those of the migrant workers they recruit.

== Statistics ==
Currently Malaysia employs the largest numbers of Indonesian migrant workers, followed by Taiwan, Saudi Arabia, Hong Kong, and Singapore. These are official numbers; the actual numbers might be far larger contributed by unrecorded illegal entry of Indonesian workers into foreign countries.

=== Employer countries ===
Source:BNP2TKI

Country	2011	2012	2013	2014*
Malaysia	134,120	134,023	150,236	107,085
Taiwan	78,865	81,071	83,544	68,874
Saudi Arabia	137,835	40,655	45,394	38,104
Hong Kong	50,301	45,478	41,769	30,208
Singapore	47,786	41,556	34,655	25,601
United Arab Emirates	39,917	35,571	44,505	15,276
Oman	7,306	8,836	10,719	15,035
South Korea	11,392	13,593	15,374	9,623
Brunei	10,804	13,146	11,269	9,298
United States	13,749	15,353	15,021	7,839
Qatar	16,616	20,380	16,237	6,872
Bahrain	4,379	6,328	5,384	4,535
Japan	2,508	3,293	3,042	2,093
Kuwait	2,723	2,518	2,534	1,530
Turkey	1,016	1,209	1,518	1,155
Italy	3,408	3,691	3,746	1,075
China	1,072	1,967	2,055	812
Fiji	556	970	848	809
Canada				805
Spain	1,484	1,746	1,417	754
Mauritius	478	982	1,017	734
Netherlands	592	798	1,176	664
Thailand	1,113	1,035	1,041	597
Germany	299	697	1,168	518
Australia	526	945	1,012	441
South Africa	1,272	1,388	905	460
Trinidad and Tobago				481

- to 31 October

=== Job sector ===
Employment type	2011	2012	2013	2014*
Domestic Worker	267,231	164,981	168,318	113,952
Plantation Worker	39,622	36,478	47,598	40,146
Operator	40,847	40,347	46,799	32,819
Care Taker	48,492	51,474	45,751	40,581
Construction Worker	5,625	11,141	15,580	6,779
General Worker	8,364	8,488	13,834	7,338
Deck Hand	4,509	12,283	11,249	8,904
Worker (Man)	33,398	17,030	9,249	2,041
Able Body Seaman	4,777	7,796	8,719	4,017
Housekeepers	14,643	16,006	8,301	4,759
Operator Production	1	1,913	5,856	6,244
Labour	17,098	19,493	5,854	4,270
Fisherman	4,371	5,213	5,559	3,988
Driver	0	974	4,746	6,945
Production Operator	3,745	5,163	4,664	na
Gardener	2,018	2,580	3,831	2,658
Worker	1,195	2,131	3,793	6,300
Agricultural Labour	6,814	3,201	3,604	na
Waiter	4,733	4,144	3,153	1,635
Engineer	2,339	2,939	3,115	na

- to 31 October

== In popular culture ==
- Nadila, a character in Kakushigoto: My Dad's Secret Ambition, is an Indonesian migrant worker who works as a housekeeper in Japan.

== See also ==
- Indonesian diaspora
- Human trafficking in Indonesia
- Erwiana Sulistyaningsih
- Overseas Filipino Worker (OFW) – Filipino version of migrant worker
