= Erwiana Sulistyaningsih =

Indonesian woman in Hong Kong

Erwiana Sulistyaningsih (born 7 January 1991) is an Indonesian woman and a former maid who was known for suffering abuse at the hands of her employer while working as a domestic helper in Hong Kong. Her case received worldwide attention, and scrutiny. It was addressed by both Indonesia's President Susilo Bambang Yudhoyono and Hong Kong Chief Executive Leung Chun-ying. In 2014, she was included by Time magazine on its list of 100 most powerful people.

== Early life ==
Erwiana was born on 7 January 1991 to Rohmad and Suratmi Saputra. Her father was a part-time worker. After graduating from high school, she wished to continue her education to become an accountant. However, she had to forgo higher education because of her family's economic situation. This prompted her to apply to be a migrant worker. Eventually she accepted a contract as a foreign domestic helper in Hong Kong. According to Antik Priswahyudi, a member of the Hong Kong Migrant Workers Union, she did not wish to be a migrant worker, but was motivated to support her family and to save for her college tuition. She saw no choice other than to become a domestic helper in Hong Kong.

In 2012, Erwiana received permission to be a migrant worker through PT Graha Ayu Karsa and went to Hong Kong through this company on 27 May 2013. After obtaining a work visa, Erwiana traveled alone to Hong Kong where she was immediately brought to her new employer.

== Abuse ==
Erwiana was physically abused for 8 months by her employer, a mother in her forties, Law Wan-tung. Erwiana claimed that she was made to sleep on the floor, work 21 hours per day, and was not permitted a day off. If she did not clean the house or was slow to respond to her employers call, she would be beaten. She alleged that she was beaten with various household items, citing a mop, a ruler and a clothes hanger. Over the course of 8 months, her wounds became infected. She was not allowed to visit a doctor, leaving her health in a weakened state, unable to walk. Her employer arranged for her to return to Indonesia and gave her HK$70 (less than US$10) before threatening the lives of her parents if she revealed the details of the assault to anyone. Her employer left her at the Hong Kong International Airport with a ticket home. Abandoned at the airport and unable to walk, Erwiana finally met Rianti, a fellow Indonesian who escorted her home to Ngawi. Rianti then brought her to Amal Sehat Hospital in Sragen.

== Repercussions ==
This incident highlighted ongoing concerns regarding the treatment of domestic workers in Hong Kong. In November 2012, Amnesty International condemned the Hong Kong and Indonesian governments for leaving women vulnerable to exploitation, restrictions on freedoms, physical and sexual violence, lack of food and long working hours. As a result of the police not investigating the claim, protests were held in Hong Kong with up to 5,000 demonstrators and various civil rights groups calling for justice for Erwiana.

Hong Kong Police sent a delegation of officers to the hospital to interview Erwiana, who filed charges after a "thorough and in-depth investigation".

Law Wan-tung was arrested at the Hong Kong International Airport while attempting to board a plane to Thailand. She was charged in a Kwun Tong court of grievous bodily harm, assault causing actual bodily harm, common assault, and four counts of criminal intimidation. She was found guilty of 18 out of 20 counts of abuse of Erwiana and two other helpers. On 27 February 2015, Law was sentenced to 6-years imprisonment by the District Court. She was given a parole in November 2018, after serving half the sentence (3 1/2 years in prison).

== Time 100 ==
In April 2014, Time released its 2014 edition of "100 Most Powerful People", which included Sulistyaningsih in the 'Icons' category. Along with several names issued by anti-violation activist Somaly Mam, Erwiana was cited as an "inspiration" for other migrant workers fighting against violence and discrimination.

In the magazine, Mam was quoted as saying:

Erwiana shared that she endured months of torture at the hands of her employer, a 44-year-old mother of two, who told Erwiana that her family would be killed if she did not perform her duties. Nor was Erwiana paid; when she was sent home, she had $9 in her pocket. ... But Erwiana could not be broken, nor could she be silenced. She spoke out against the woman, who faces charges including causing grievous bodily harm and common assault, and with the support of family Erwiana is advocating for better laws to protect others who may share her fate, placing a spotlight on the plight of a vulnerable and often invisible population. It is brave women like her who speak up for the voiceless who will create lasting change.

When Erwiana heard the news, she just said that she was surprised, hoping that no more women be treated under such circumstances.
