= Hong Kong–Indonesia relations =

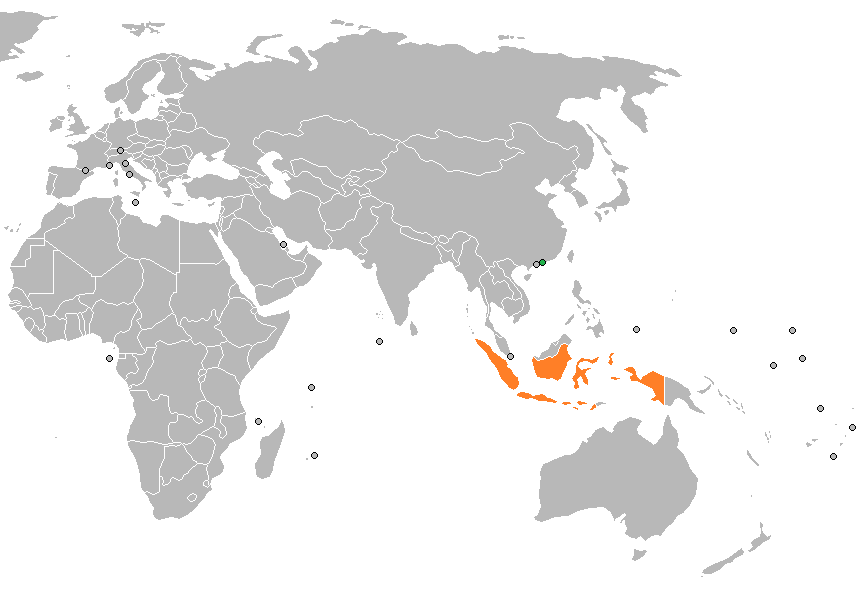
- Hong Kong: Indonesia

Hong Kong–Indonesia relations are bilateral relations between Hong Kong and Indonesia.

== Official relations ==
Indonesia has a Consulate-General in Hong Kong located at Causeway Bay, Hong Kong Island. Hong Kong has autonomy in the conduct of its external relations in a broad range of appropriate fields, including commercial, social, and cultural aspects. The Hong Kong Economic & Trade Office in Jakarta represents Hong Kong in Indonesia.

== Trade ==
Indonesia is Hong Kong 7th largest export market in 2015, while Hong Kong is Indonesia's 15th largest export market in 2015. Hong Kong occupied 1.4% of Indonesian export market, while Indonesia contributed 2.3% of Hong Kong's data.

== Indonesians in Hong Kong ==
Indonesians forms the second-largest ethnic minority group in Hong Kong, numbering 102 100, only second to Filipinos. Almost all Indonesians in Hong Kong are those who arrive under limited-term contracts for employment as foreign domestic helpers. Indonesian workers in Hong Kong comprise 2.4% of all overseas Indonesian workers.

== Incidents ==
During the May 1998 riots of Indonesia, attacks on Chinese Indonesians prompted emotions among Chinese ethnic groups in Hong Kong. As a response, leader of the Hong Kong Democratic Party, Martin Lee, criticized the issue in a formal letter to the Indonesian President B. J. Habibie. With an independent policy from China, the Hong Kong government made protest to the Indonesian government and threatened to expel Indonesian labourers in Hong Kong. The threat did not come to action at last.

== State visits ==
In 2017, Indonesian President Joko Widodo arrived in Hong Kong on April 30 for a two-day official visit. He was welcomed by the Chief Executive of Hong Kong Leung Chun Ying at the Government House, Hong Kong on 1 May. A memorandum of understanding on cultural co-operation and a joint statement on labour co-operation were signed between the two governments.

== See also ==
- Foreign relations of Hong Kong
- Foreign relations of Indonesia
