= Chip Tsao =

Hong Kong columnist, broadcaster, and writer

- 陶傑
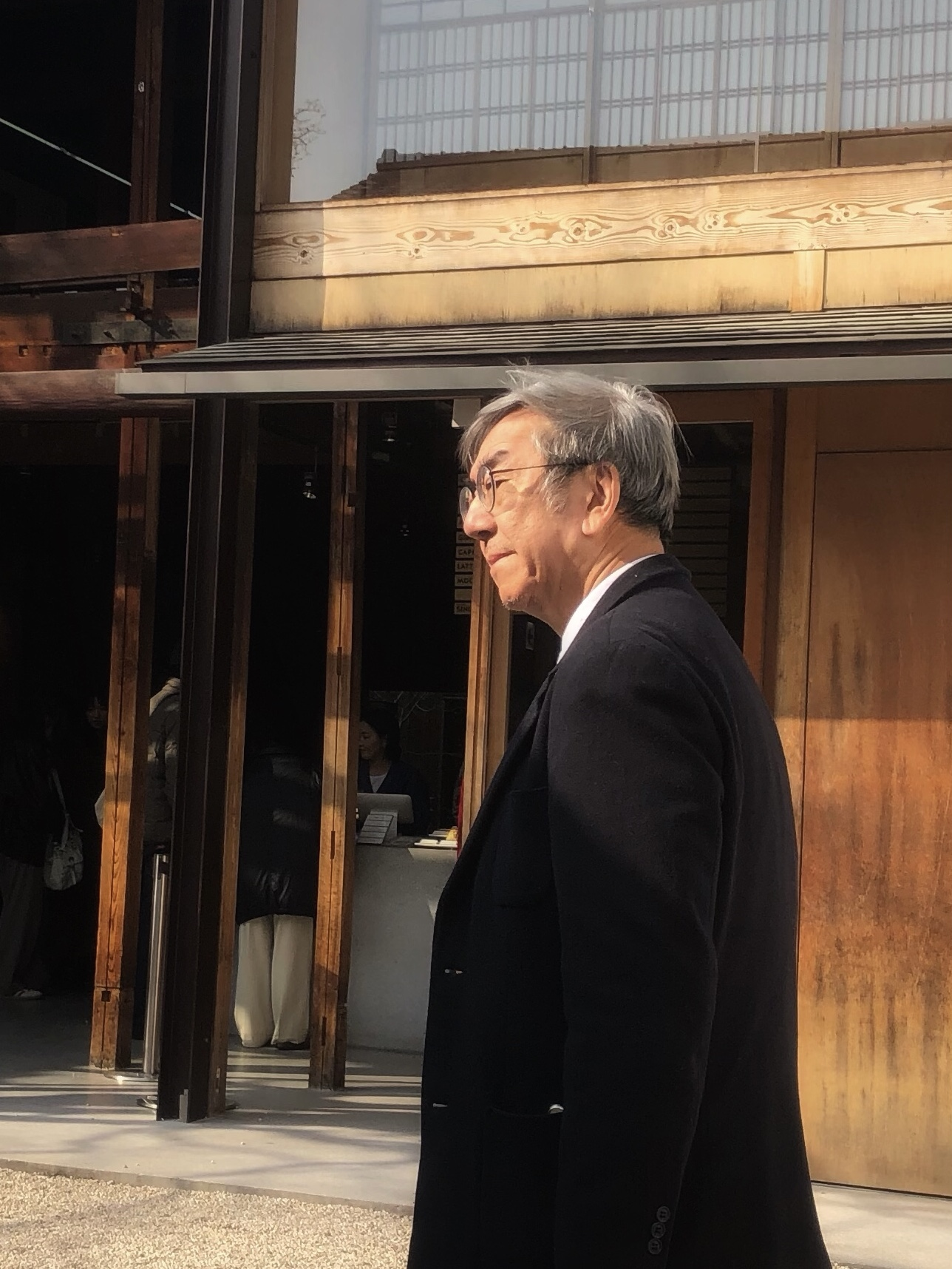
- Tsao in March 2024
- Born: 曹捷; 17 August 1958 (age 68); British Hong Kong
- Other name: To Kit
- Education: London School of Economics (PGDip); University of Warwick (BA); Pui Kiu Middle School; Lingnan Secondary School

Chip Tsao (born 17 August 1958), also known by his Chinese language pen name To Kit, is a multilingual Hong Kong–based columnist, broadcaster, and writer. His writings are mostly in Chinese. He is well known for his sarcasm and wry sense of humour.

== Family and education ==
Chip Tsao
- Chinese: 曹捷
Transcriptions
Standard Mandarin
- Hanyu Pinyin: Cáo Jié
Yue: Cantonese
- Jyutping: Cou^{4} Zit^{3}

To Kit
- Traditional Chinese: 陶傑
- Simplified Chinese: 陶杰
Transcriptions
Standard Mandarin
- Hanyu Pinyin: Táo Jié
Yue: Cantonese
- Jyutping: Tou^{4} Git^{6}

Tsao's family traces their roots back to Guangxi. His father was the vice chief editor of Ta Kung Pao, a leftwing newspaper in Hong Kong, whilst his mother was also an editor of the same paper. His maternal grandfather was a journalist of the Pearl River Daily. He was raised in Hong Kong's Wanchai district, and began reading early in his life. Tsao attended Pui Kiu Middle School and later Lingnan Secondary School in Hong Kong. During this time, his writing was once published in The New Evening Post. In 1983, he was awarded a BA in English and European Literature from the University of Warwick. Then he completed a Postgraduate Diploma in International Relations from the London School of Economics. He states that he never thought about becoming a writer in his youth, however, and that his parents discouraged him from this career because they felt it would be dangerous.

Tsao is married and has two children.

== Career ==
Tsao began his journalism career in the United Kingdom as a reporter for the BBC and Radio Television Hong Kong. Then, famous writer Jin Yong (Louis Cha) invited him to write a regular column for Ming Pao about his experiences living abroad. It was at this time that he began to use his pen name To Kit. The name of his column in Ming Pao,"'The Golden Venture", derives from the name of a vessel that took Chinese illegal immigrants to the United States in 1993. His first book, Alongside Thames, was published in 1995.

Tsao later he joined a team of broadcasters to host a weekly current affairs programme on RTHK named 'Free as Wind' (講東講西). In September 2003, he switched to the Commercial Radio Hong Kong to host a similar daily radio entitled 'Summit' (光明頂, literally 'the Peak of Light').

Tsao currently writes for Apple Daily and HK Magazine. Pieces from his columns, such as Come On, James, have gone viral and become an internet sensation in several new forms of adaptations.

Tsao is not without his controversies. His status as a premier writer of Hong Kong is often challenged, one example being a piece by Rosetta Lui and Perry Lam in the December 2007 issue of Muse: "Some 15 or 20 years from now, the books of Chip Tsao... if they are talked about at all, will most probably be used as anecdotal evidence to illustrate how dumbed-down our city's culture has become since the 1997 return to Chinese sovereignty. His essays are always funny, sometimes lyrical but almost never ruminative."

== Political viewpoints ==
=== Hong Kong politics ===
Tsao first began writing about Hong Kong public affairs in a column for English-language newspaper Eastern Express. He is often perceived as pro-British, and has been accused of looking down on China. But in a South China Morning Post interview in 2008, Tsao explained his position on China and denied that he was an anglophile, saying: "I am critical of modern China but if people think criticising makes you a traitor, that’s their problem. Some people say I’m an Anglophile but I don’t consider myself one. I just admire beautiful things and good values, and that includes Tibetan culture. There are bad things about the Brits too – they can be hypocrites and racists."

=== Accusations of racism ===
Tsao has faced various accusations of racism for his English-language writings. In October 2005, an article he wrote for the South China Morning Post entitled "Have Hong Kong girls stopped looking for Mr White?" sparked accusations that he promoted discrimination and was jealous of white men in Hong Kong. Tsao responded that he was merely being sarcastic and provocative, repeating themes which were often discussed in Chinese media, and accused his critics themselves of being racist and lacking the ability to "read between the lines".

On 27 March 2009, an article of Tsao's entitled "The War at Home" was published in the free HK Magazine. In it, he wrote that the Philippines was unworthy of claiming the Spratly Islands from China because "as a nation of servants, you don't flex your muscles at your master, from whom you earn most of your bread and butter." Many Filipinos decried his article as racist, discriminatory, and demeaning, and the Philippine government declared him an "undesirable alien" as a result. His writings provoked negative reactions from various Philippine legislators; Senator Pia Cayetano stated that "instead of contributing to intelligent discussions on ways to resolve the Spratlys dispute, Tsao only succeeded in eliciting hatred and sowing more confusion not only among Filipinos but maybe even among his fellow Chinese who are not aware of the intricacies of the issue", while Parañaque Congressman Roilo Golez refused to accept Tsao's apology for his article, and challenged him to a boxing match. On 30 March 2009, HK Magazine issued an apology for the offence Tsao's article had caused. The following day, Tsao subsequently admitted his wrongdoing and apologised to the Philippine government and its people in an interview aired over Hong Kong’s ATV. He said, "I realized that I had crossed the line. I now offer my public apology." He has also indicated, however, that the article was meant as satire, and that it "was never intended to be insulting to the Filipino domestic workers."

=== Criticism of #MeToo ===
In 2017, Tsao posted on Facebook mocking the Me Too movement one day after the revelation from Hong Kong athlete Lui Lai Yiu that she was sexually assaulted by a former coach. Tsao wrote that he was touched on the face without his consent by a female teacher when he was in kindergarten and now he realised that he was "one of the victims of low-end sex abuse". "Thanks to the Facebook generation, by simply attaching a selfie, anyone can become a Harvey Weinstein or a Kevin Spacey," he added. Some praised him for his "good sense of humour" and recognizing that any man could be open to accusations over past inappropriate behaviour of which they may or may not be guilty. More including the Equal Opportunities Commission and the Association Concerning Sexual Violence Against Women criticised him for inappropriate analogy and ignorance on sexual violence.

== Works ==
Tsao's work, both on radio and in his columns, concentrates on the following subjects:

- Changes in governance of Hong Kong prior to and following the transfer of sovereignty to China
- The essence of classical Chinese and Western civilisation
- Difference between Chinese and Westerners (particular in terms of politics and lifestyle)
- The 'peasant mentality' of the Chinese
- Films A new film called "ENTHRALLED" released on 10 April 2014 in Hong Kong which portrays post-handover Hong Kong through the love story of a group of returnees.
- Prominent women (he wrote a column on the achievements of well-known Chinese women in Ming Pao Monthly between 1998 and 2003)

== Publications ==
Major works by Chip Tsao:

Title	Translation	Publication date	ISBN	Footnote
黃金冒險號	The Golden Venture	October 1998	ISBN 962-451-371-6	
再見蘇絲黃	Adieu, Suzie Wong	January 1999	ISBN 962-451-527-1	
不給一口釘	Don't Give a Damn	February 1999	ISBN 962-451-483-6	
馬戲班主走了之後	After the Circus Owner was Gone	February 1999	ISBN 962-451-553-0	
日暮荒老的地平線上	On the Ageing Horizon	July 1999	ISBN 962-451-597-2	
名人學語文 – 訪問系列	Celebrities Learn Languages – an Interview Series	July 1999	ISBN 962-85603-1-X	
香港這杯雞尾酒	Hong Kong the cocktail	September 1999	ISBN 962-451-573-5	
中國化的魚眼睛	The Sinified Eyes of a Fish	December 1999	ISBN 962-451-583-2	
泰晤士河畔	Alongside Thames	January 2000	ISBN 962-451-368-6	
因為它在那裡	Because It's There	January 2000	ISBN 962-451-620-0	
權力的地圖	The Map of Power	April 2000	ISBN 962-451-461-5	
颱風和島的約會	The Date of a Typhoon and an Isle	March 2001	ISBN 962-451-674-X	
偉大的十字街頭	The Great Crisscross Streets	June 2001	ISBN 962-451-659-6	
流芳頌	Ode to the Famed	June 2001	ISBN 962-973-544-X	
名人學語文 – 訪談系列第二輯	Celebrities Learn Languages – an Interview Series II	June 2001	ISBN 962-85603-2-8	
那一頭是甚麼景色	What's the View over There?	July 2001	ISBN 962-451-699-5	
香港，你要活下去！	Hong Kong, Never Say Die!	October 2001	ISBN 962-451-702-9	
香港，你要爭口氣	Hong Kong, Make a Good Show	April 2002	ISBN 962-451-719-3	
天涯遠望的焦點	The Focus from Faraway	July 2002	ISBN 962-451-722-3	
滿香園的一朵朵笑靨	The Smiling Faces in a Fragrant Garden	August 2002	ISBN 962-451-719-3	
思考在命運之上	Fate for Thought	October 2002	ISBN 962-451-736-3	
有光的地方	A Place Where There is Light	July 2003	ISBN 962-451-760-6	
風流花相	Risqué Expressions	July 2003	ISBN 962-451-759-2	
圖騰下的銀河	The Galaxy below the Totem	November 2003	ISBN 962-451-800-9	
魚的哲學	Philosophy of Fish	January 2004	ISBN 962-451-776-2	
男女關係 2	Love Affairs 2	April 2004	ISBN 962-86993-3-4	co-written
自戀紅燭	Self-intoxicated in a Red Candle	May 2004	ISBN 962-451-805-X	
石點頭 ─ 鍾逸傑回憶錄	Feeling the Stones: Reminiscences by David Akers-Jones	June 2004	ISBN 978-962-209-664-6	As translator
無眠在世紀末	Sleepless at the End of a Century	July 2004	ISBN 962-451-831-9	
她是他的一場宿命	She is his destiny	July 2004	ISBN 962-451-819-X	
男女關係 3	Love Affairs 3	July 2004	ISBN 988-97754-5-X	co-written
大偶像	Great Idol	December 2004	ISBN 988-98002-6-8	
迷宮三千祭	3000 Worships to A Labyrinth	December 2004	ISBN 962-451-872-6	
霓虹花憶	In Search of Neon-like Sweet Remembrance	February 2005	ISBN 962-451-883-1	
那一夜星斗	Stars of that Night	May 2005	ISBN 962-451-845-9	
她把靈魂銘刻在水上	She Inscribed her Soul on the Water's Surface	June 2005	ISBN 962-8872-03-6	
國度的零時	Regime at Midnight	July 2005	ISBN 962-451-918-8	
峰青夕陽紅 : 陶傑星期天評論集	Summit in Green; Setting Sun, Red: Collection of To Kit's Sunday Critiques	July 2005	ISBN 988-98609-4-5	
青木瓜之戀	Taste the Feel of Love by Green Papaya	October 2005	ISBN 962-451-937-4	
天神的微笑	The Grin of Deities	April 2006	ISBN 962-451-953-6	
黑嶺魔宮	Temple of Doom on the Dark Summit	July 2006	ISBN 962-451-974-9	
MK愚樂圈	Great Idol II: Stupid Showbiz Mong Kok Style	July 2006	ISBN 988-98773-2-5	
歷史和地理間的沉思	Meditation between History and Geography	December 2006	ISBN 978-988-216-010-1	
快樂鄉的一天	One Day in a Joyful Hometown	May 2007	ISBN 978-988-216-033-0	
莎士比亞的安魂曲	Shakespeare's Requiem	July 2007	ISBN 978-988-216-037-8	
海豚男的終極夜空	The Ultimate Night Sky of Dolphin Boys	October 2007	ISBN 978-988-216-059-0	
芳菲花田	Fragrance-billowing Field of Flowers	December 2007	ISBN 978-988-216-070-5	
天國的凱歌	Song of Triumph of Heaven	July 2008	ISBN 978-988-216-093-4	
恭敬有罪──陶傑短評	Deference is Guilt - Comments in Brief by To Kit	Oct 2008	ISBN 978-988-17-8351-6	
搔背有趣──陶傑短評	Back-scratching is Interesting - Comments in Brief by To Kit	Nov 2008	ISBN 978-988-17-8352-3	
乳房裏的異世	Extraordinary World inside Breasts	Dec 2008	ISBN 978-988-216-121-4	
暗夜寇丹	Nail Varnish in the Night	Apr 2009	ISBN 978-988-216-138-2	
流金千蕊	Golden Buds	July 2009	ISBN 978-988-216-153-5	
這個荒謬的快樂年代	This Ridiculous Happy Era	Feb 2010	ISBN 978-988-216-174-0	
小奴才的修煉之道	Tao of Being Flunkies	July 2010	ISBN 978-988-216-196-2	
與陶傑同牀	Sharing a bed with To Kit	July 2013	ISBN 978-988-216-265-5	
