= Pui Kiu Middle School =

Secondary school in Hong Kong

Coordinates: 22.2878°N 114.2046°E

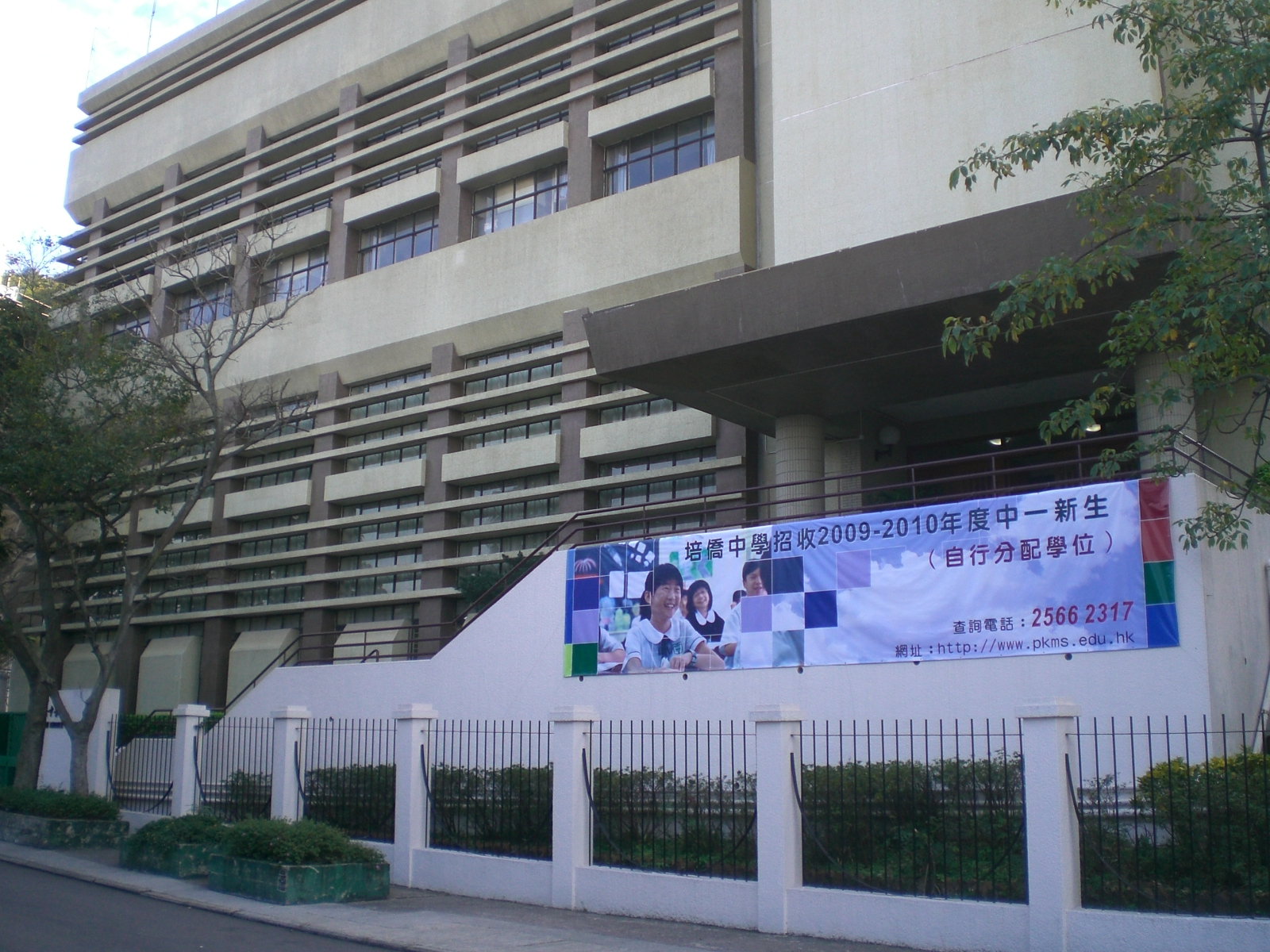
- 190 Tin Hau Temple Road, North Point, Hong Kong

Information
- Type: Secondary school
- Established: 1946
- Authority: Pui Kiu Education Organization
- Principal: Ng Wun Ki
- Enrollment: Around 900
- Language: Chinese
- Website: https://www.pkms.edu.hk/

Pui Kiu Middle School
- Traditional Chinese: 培僑中學
- Simplified Chinese: 培侨中学
Transcriptions
Standard Mandarin
- Hanyu Pinyin: Péi Qiáo Zhōngxué
Yue: Cantonese
- Jyutping: pui4 kiu4 zung1 hok6

Pui Kiu Middle School (Chinese: 培僑中學) is a secondary school in Hong Kong. Located in the Eastern District area of North Point. The school uses Chinese language as a medium of instruction.

During a portion of its history in British Hong Kong it was known as being pro-Mainland China.

== History ==
The school was founded in 1946 by overseas Chinese investors from Southeast Asia and elsewhere, originally in Pui Kiu Lang Park (around Happy Valley to the Mid-Levels area). In the 1980s it relocated to its current location in Braemar Hill.

=== Controversy ===
When the People's Republic of China was established in 1949, the school announced that it would uphold Communist disciplines in its curriculum. This placed a severe strain on relations between the school and the colonial Hong Kong government, as well as with the local population, whose political opinion tended towards anti-communism.

In the late 1970s, the Hong Kong government, under the education laws, took over the school and reorganized it.

== Present day ==
Currently, Pui Kiu Middle School is part of the Direct Subsidy Scheme. The campus features a swimming pool, student dormitories, laboratories, computer rooms, classrooms, an indoor dining hall, an auditorium, a library and an indoor stadium.

== Notable alumni ==
- Gary Cheng: former Legislative Councillor
- Ma Lik (1952–2007): former Legislative Councillor and former chairman of the leftist DAB Party
- To Kit: editorial writer
- Yvonne Yung Hung: actress
- Keeree Kanjanapas: Thai-Hong Kong businessman
