= Incorporation of international law =

The incorporation of international law is the process by which international agreements become part of the municipal law of a sovereign state. A country incorporates a treaty by passing domestic legislation that gives effect to the treaty in the national legal system.

Whether incorporation is necessary depends on a country's domestic law. Some states follow a monist system where treaties can become law without incorporation, if their provisions are considered sufficiently self-explanatory. In contrast dualist states require all treaties to be incorporated before they can have any domestic legal effects. Most countries follow a treaty ratification method somewhere between these two extremes.

== Monist systems ==
In monist systems like the Netherlands, treaties can normally be ratified only after they are approved by the legislature, but the treaties then become legally binding in domestic law if they are self-executing.

France is another example of a monist system. Under French law, ratified treaties are considered to be superior to domestic legislation. However ratification must often be approved by the French Parliament, especially in cases where the treaty "modifies provisions which are matters for statute". In such cases, incorporation is often either redundant or very little is required.

== Dualist systems ==
The dualist position is exemplified by the United Kingdom, where treaty-making is considered to be the exclusive competence of "Her Majesty's Government" (the executive). All treaties must be incorporated if they are to have any effect on domestic legislation. To do otherwise would violate the doctrine of the sovereignty of Parliament, which reserves legislative primacy to the British parliament. However, treaties may have interpretative value, and judges consider that Parliament, in the absence of clear contrary intention, did not intend for an Act to conflict with a ratified treaty.

The position of the United States is intermediate to the two extremes described above. The Supremacy Clause (VI.2) of the United States Constitution states that "all Treaties made, or which shall be made, under the authority of the United States, shall be the supreme Law of the land." However, the term "treaty" has a more restricted sense in American law than in international law. Of the more than 16,000 international agreements entered into by the United States between 1946 and 1999, only 912 were ratified by the required two thirds of the US Senate of the Treaty Clause of the Constitution.

The US Supreme Court has also limited the direct effect of ratified treaties, notably in the case of Medellín v. Texas (2008). Almost all treaties must be incorporated into federal law by both chambers of the US Congress to have effect.
