= Filipinos in Hong Kong =

Filipinos in Hong Kong 在港菲律賓人
Mga Pilipino sa Hong Kong
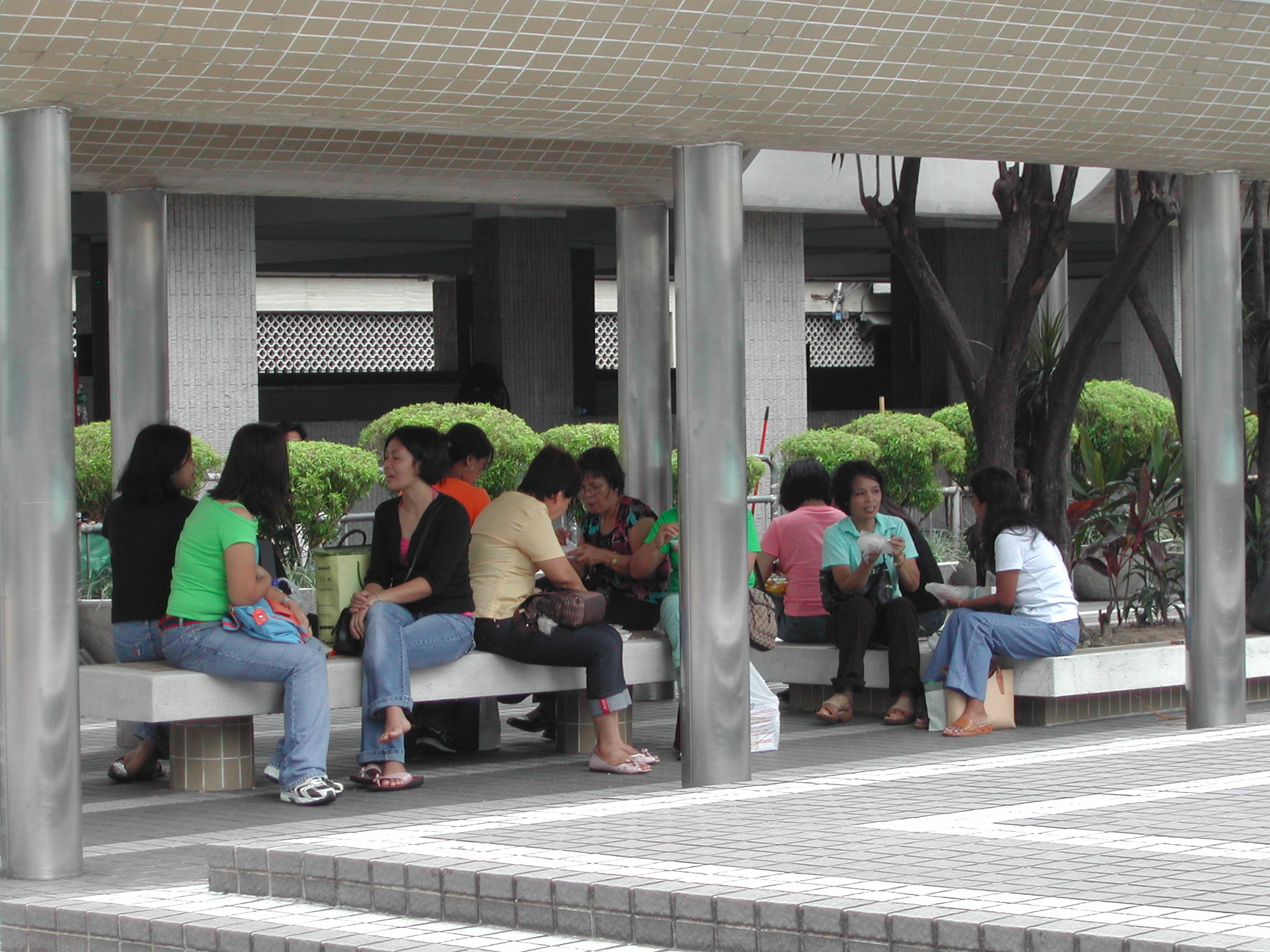
- Filipina domestic workers in the Statue Square

Total population
- 200,000; 2.7% of Hong Kong's population

Regions with significant populations
- Wan Chai District

Languages
- Tagalog, English (Philippine and Hong Kong), Cantonese, Kapampangan, Cebuano, Hiligaynon, other Philippine languages

Religion
- Christianity (Roman Catholicism, Protestantism, Iglesia Filipina Independiente), Islam, Buddhism

Filipinos in Hong Kong (Filipino: Mga Pilipino sa Hong Kong) refer to the Filipinos residing or working in Hong Kong. They constitute the largest ethnic minority in Hong Kong, numbering approximately 130,000, many of whom work as foreign domestic helpers. The Eastern District has the highest concentration of Filipino residents in Hong Kong, with 3.24% of the district's population being of Filipino descent (14,596 people).

== Domestic Migrant Workers ==
=== Overview ===
The Philippines was one of the first countries to send workers through the foreign domestic helper program beginning in the 1970's. This allowed helpers to work for a single employer, working for at least a minimum allowable wage. Most of these workers were mothers, grandmothers or eldest daughters, working to save money for their children, seeking better living standards with higher wages than in the Philippines. According to CNN, Filipino migrant workers are legally required to live in their employers' homes. Because Hong Kong does not have laws limiting the maximum working hours per day or week, workers can perform tasks for as long as sixteen hours a day six days a week. The range of services that are achieved for employers include cleaning, cooking, shopping for groceries, and taking care of children, the elderly and pets. Nonetheless, according to The Guardian, domestic helpers still consider Hong Kong to be one of the best places in Asia get work. Filipino domestic workers report that their families back home make demands for money and have unrealistic ideas about finance, but, many state their main responsibility is to provide for their families through migration.

=== Discrimination ===
The mistreatment of Filipino domestic workers in Hong Kong is commonly found through stereotypes and disciplinary regulation. According to anthropologist Nicole Constable, Hongkongers consider Filipino workers to be lazy, demanding, lacking commitment, and "only in it for the money." They are also labelled as "apathetic" about Hong Kong in addition to being poor and uneducated from a "backwards country." On the other hand, some citizens view these helpers as "hard workers who contribute valuable labor to the colony." Chinese women would also view female Filipino helpers as a threat to their roles as wives and mothers, resulting in the loss of their jobs. They can be perceived as "flirtatious," different from Chinese women, and even willing to provide sexual favours. Employers imposes strict rules such as being under constant surveillance, and curfew. According to sociolinguistic professor Hans J Ladegaard, workers generally do not have their own living quarters and are kept inside almost 24 hours a day, akin to modern-day slavery. According to English professor Odine De Guzman, non-government organizations propose to address the abuses of overseas Filipino workers, although Hong Kong has yet to ratify any treaties, an example being the International Convention on the Protection of the Rights of All Migrant Workers and Members of Their Families.

=== Sundays ===
According to The Guardian, migrant workers have been congregating on their one day off each week since the 1980s. Sundays are a lifeline for Filipino workers, giving them the ability to rest, run errands for themselves, and to recreationally enjoy activities such as picnics and dances. They are also able to use their free time to join protests. Groups commonly gather around Victoria Park, Central District, Wan Chai and Statue Square, transforming the streets into "Little Manila."

=== 2019–2020 ===
==== The Hong Kong Protests ====
According to anthropologist Nicole Constable, women migrant workers have protested in the past, protesting alongside the Hong Kong People's Alliance on WTO. The 2019–20 Hong Kong Protests affected on the Filipino community. In 2019, many Filipino domestic workers voiced their opinions on the protest. Some expressed their sympathies towards the protestors, because many protestors grew up in households where these workers had taken care of them growing up. Many have supported the protest, disagreeing with the proposed extradition bill, and even joining peaceful marches throughout Hong Kong. Others however, have expressed their reluctance to support because of the work and visa status in Hong Kong, concerns about losing their occupation, the relocation of employers because of the impeded violence, and their overall safety. Despite the risk of danger, many workers have rejected the proposal of the Philippine government to temporarily ban sending workers to Hong Kong during the protests in fear of losing financial and employment opportunities. According to Global Voices, rest days are no longer fixed on Sundays and are cut short to avoid police confrontation due to the schedule of protestors and the possibility of disruption to public transport, affecting the workers' ability to see others in the community.

==== COVID-19 ====
Since 2020, the COVID-19 pandemic has affected Filipino migrant workers' lives in Hong Kong. Because of the government strict live-in restrictions, workers are limited to staying at home, unable to social distance with employers. According to the Diplomat, "this situation has fuelled tension and mistrust between employers due to security, finance and health, allowing for abuse and ill treatment of workers to occur more often." Psychologist Nelson Yeung suggests that workers are subjugated to anxiety and mental exhaustion due to the increase of responsibilities in the household as many public facilities are closed. There is also an increase of fear for the loss of jobs during the pandemic, yet some workers are grateful to still have employment. Filipino domestic workers would seek emotional and material support from others in the community, but due to the pandemic, opportunities to publicly gather on Sundays are reduced. According to author Jason Ng, rules and regulations are dependent on the employers, with some who restricts workers from having days off or to leave the house (unless to go out for essentials), to those who more relaxed and "encourages workers to go out on Sundays as long as they practice social distance."

== Community life ==
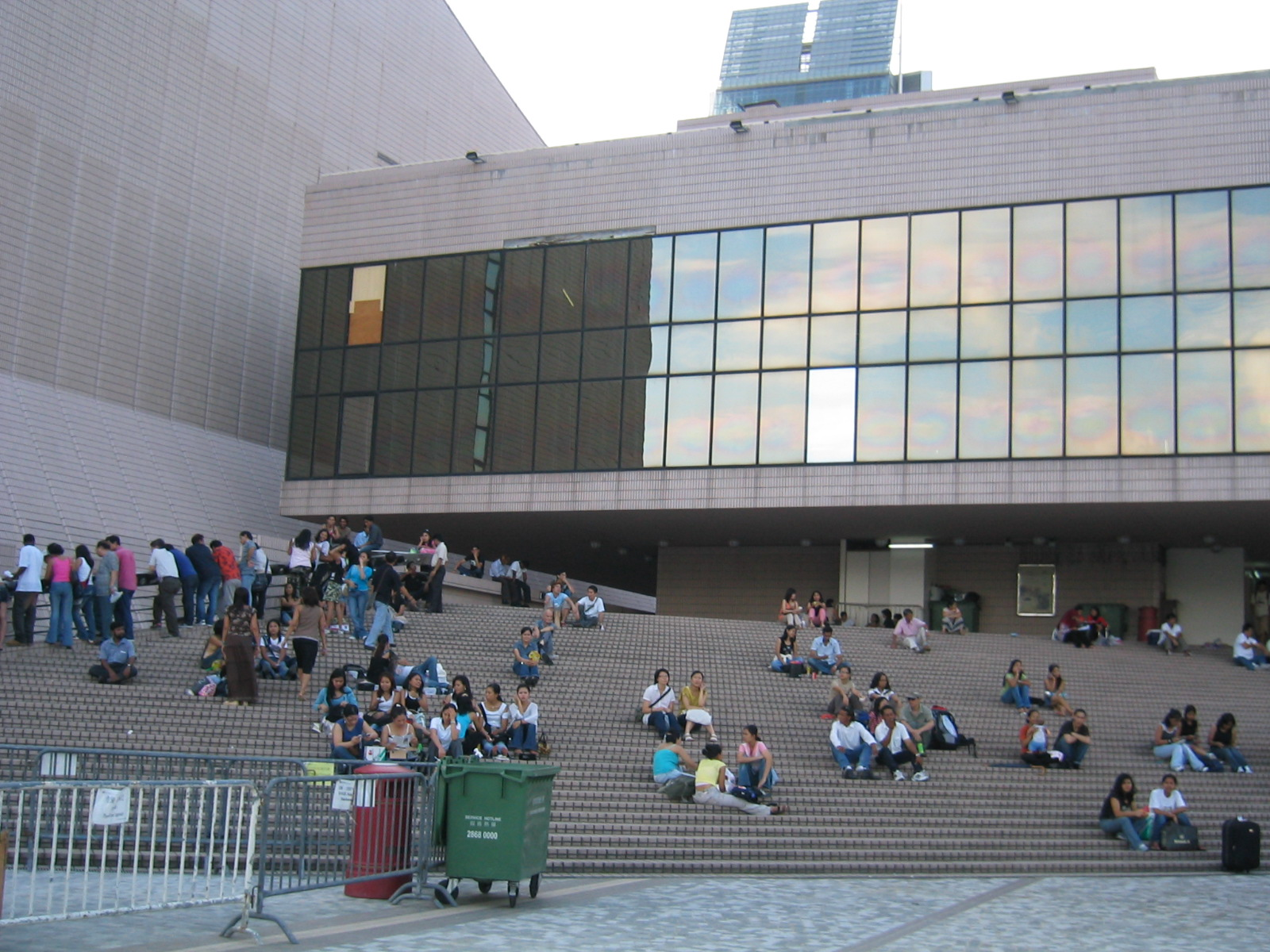
Filipino domestic workers gathering around the Hong Kong Cultural Centre in Tsim Sha Tsui.

=== Language ===
Most Filipinos in Hong Kong communicate with the local population in English, usually a second language for both parties. According to the Hong Kong's Census and Statistic Department, approximately 11% of Filipino domestic workers speak Cantonese as well. Within the Filipino community in Hong Kong, they communicate in Tagalog or in another Philippine language.

=== Commerce ===
The World-Wide House arcade in Central is popular with Filipinos, as many of the shops inside the building are run by Filipinos.

=== Entertainment ===
On Sundays, large numbers of Filipino maids often gather at various spots in Central, such as the ground floor of the HSBC Hong Kong headquarters building, as for many maids in Hong Kong Sunday is their fixed once-a-week working day off, during which they socialise, eat and sing together, or sell various items. These Sunday gatherings have been called "Little Manila"

=== Religion ===
Most Filipinos in Hong Kong are Christians, the majority Roman Catholic. There are also a significant number who congregate in Protestant and non-denominational churches. A minority are Buddhists. Many attend Mass and various church services on Sunday mornings at the numerous Catholic parishes in Hong Kong offering services in Tagalog or English. According to the Roman Catholic Diocese of Hong Kong (2011), there are an estimated 120,000 Filipino Catholics making up a large part of the non-local parish membership.

Aside from the Catholics, there are congregations of Filipino Protestants who attend services in Baptist, Methodist and Presbyterian churches. There is also a full fellowship of Aglipayans or members of the Iglesia Filipina Independiente (Philippine Independent Church) that attend mass at the St John's Cathedral in Central, an Anglican church. The Filipino chaplain is Reverevend Dwight Dela Torre.

In past 30 years, Filipino evangelical Christians have grown in numbers, especially in such fellowships as Jesus is Lord (JIL), which number in the tens of thousands.

== Notable people ==
- Michael Campion, footballer
- Robbie Capito, pool player
- Rita Carpio, singer
- Teresa Carpio, singer
- Steven Dominique Cheung, pilot and politician
- Nicholas Choi, fencer
- Crisel Consunji, actress
- Agatha Kong, singer
- Felice Lieh-Mak, professor
- Yassi Pressman, actress, singer, and TV host in the Philippines
- Alex To, singer
- Janice Vidal, singer
- Jill Vidal, singer
- JW, singer
- Yumi Chung, singer

== See also ==
- Vallejos v. Commissioner of Registration, a Filipina maid's right of abode case
- Comilang v. Commissioner of Registration, a visa denial case by a Filipina maid with a Hong Kong permanent resident daughter
- Filipino NGOs in Hong Kong
