= Lingnan Secondary School =

Secondary school in Heng Fa Chuen, Hong Kong

Coordinates: 22°16′46″N 114°14′20″E

- Traditional Chinese: 嶺南中學
- Simplified Chinese: 岭南中学
Transcriptions
Standard Mandarin
- Hanyu Pinyin: Lǐngnán Zhōngxué
Yue: Cantonese
- Jyutping: Ling^{5} naam^{4} zung^{1} hok^{6}

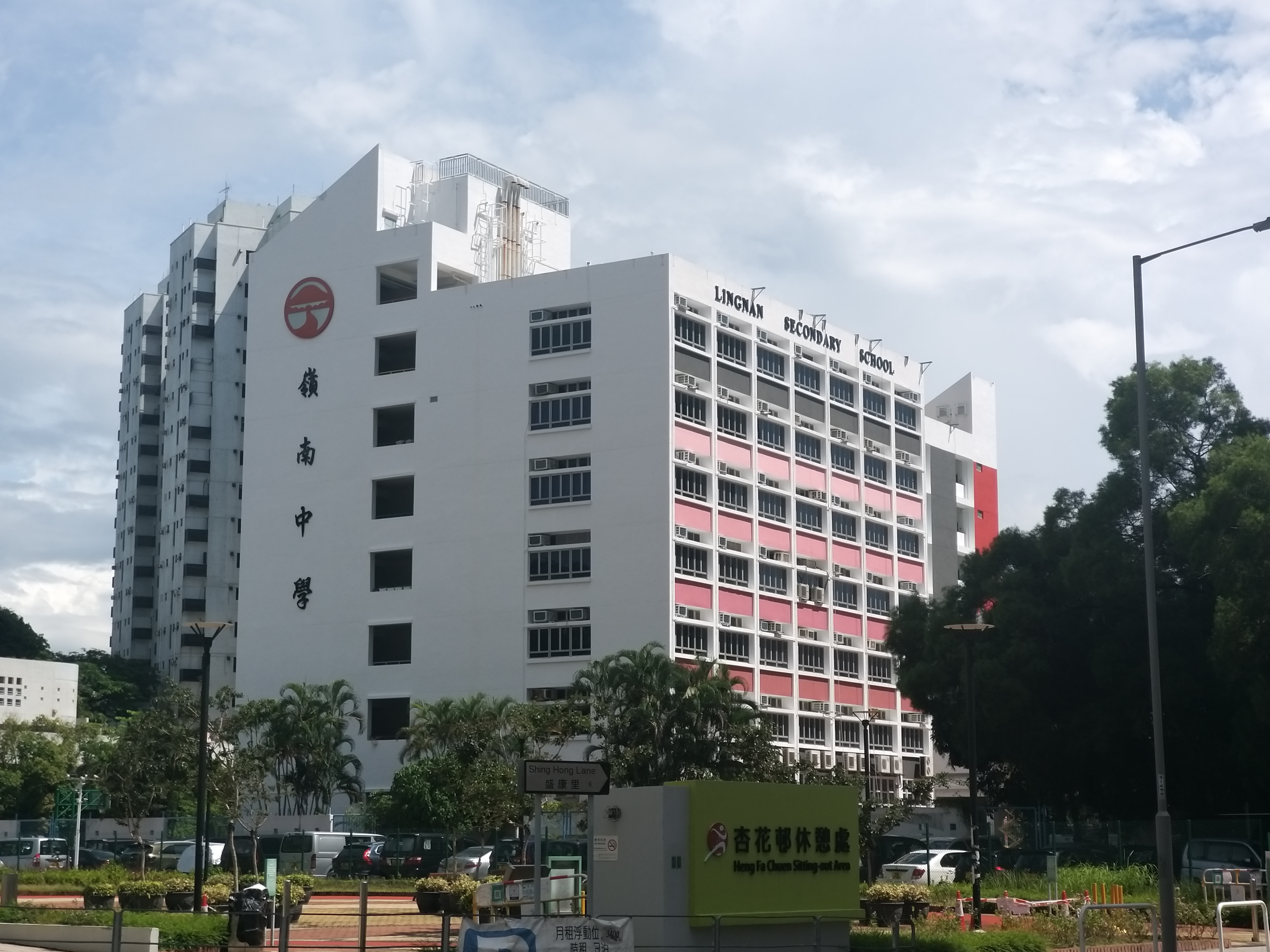
Lingnan Secondary School

Lingnan Secondary School (嶺南中學) is a secondary school located in Heng Fa Chuen, Hong Kong. It was established on Stubbs Road, and moved to its present campus in 1999. Different from other education institutions in the town, Lingnan Secondary School's students do not necessarily come from this town.
