= Kong Boys and Kong Girls =

'Kong boys' and 'Kong Girls (or Gals)' are slang that are currently and frequently used in the Hong Kong scenario, especially online. The prefix ‘Kong’ is added in front of words to denote (or emphasise) explicit Hong Kong locality, or any relation to the city.

‘Kong Boys’ and 'Kong Girls' do not actually refer to the entire Hong Kong male and female population, but instead address specific individuals who exhibit certain traits, and have since become derogatory terms as various media and online forums nowadays often use them to criticise those having adverse personalities.

A ‘Kong Boy’ or 'Kong Girl' is sometimes collectively known as a 'Hong Kong Localite' or simply 'Localite' (not to be confused with 'Localist').

== Current phenomenon ==
=== 'Kong Girls' ===
There are many characteristics of 'Kong Girls'; being materialistic and snobbish are amongst the main ones. 'Kong Girls' love lavish spending on brand-name or luxurious goods, thinking it is a way to demonstrate status and identity by flaunting such materialistic wealth, thus gaining attention from the others. Meanwhile, they usually demand their boyfriends to spend for them.

Also, 'Kong Girls' are superficial. They evaluate and choose boyfriends by auditing their economic/financial statuses and family backgrounds. They may not truly love their partners but still continue to stick with them, with the objective of siphoning some of their wealth. They believe that the richer their boyfriends, the more affection they can receive from them. Assets become the only factor in determining how deep their love is.

Furthermore, 'Kong Girls' are usually self-centred and selfish. They always put themselves on the top thinking that they are the most important people in the world. It is necessary for their boyfriends to do everything for them such as various carrying chores (bags etc.), paying for meals etc. Such females may complain on their male partners if they do not comply. As such, caring and cherishing the true feelings of one another may become a difficult task for Kong Girls.

=== 'Kong Boys' ===
Indecisiveness is one major issue amongst 'Kong Boys'. They tend to have a hard time in decision making and presenting their own ideas. They are not assertive in occasions with the opposite sex, and hence the lack of ability to express themselves, making them seem unreliable.

Being introverted is another of the traits deemed typical of a 'Kong Boy'. They do not possess good communication skills, leading them to be regarded as timid. Since they may spend much time in front of the computers (or digital peripherals), others may also consider 'Kong Boys' as social outcasts.

'Kong Boys' would be accused of being over-superficial because they only take emphasis of the outer appearances of the opposite sex, but not the innate qualities.

Moreover, lack of ambition is another one of their attributes. According to statistics, women in Hong Kong are generally more educated than men, and thus the society often regards these men who have received less education as lazy and idle. They often accuse ‘Kong Boys’ for not working hard, and only putting time on playing computer games and immersing themselves in the virtual world, causing them to neglect their real life ambitions.

Last but not least, 'Kong Boys' are usually passive in a relationship. They are often considered as the one being controlled in a relationship, as they would submit to their partner’s commands/instructions/needs, such as carrying their loads (bags, footwear etc.) and act as the inferior side in different occasions.

These are some of the characteristics of Kong Boys which branch out to other alleged derogatory descriptions of ‘Kong Boys'. For example, ‘The 81 crimes of a Kong boy’

== Causes ==
There are many factors give rise to the emergence of ‘Kong Girls, Kong Boys’ phenomenon. Below are the major ones.

=== The problem of current social customs ===
The monism of materialism is deeply embedded in people’s minds. Social status has become the index to measure one’s value. Such mindset has been transferred to the new generations through mass media, parental education etc. Moreover, most of the new generations grow up in an environment with gross materialistic abundance, which contributes to the materialistic character of 'Kong Girls'.

=== The rising status of women ===
Up until mid-2014, females have accounted for a large proportion in Hong Kong's population. There are only about 1 woman to 0.75 man. The status of women in the society has been rising and may even exceeds that of men since they have become the majority in Hong Kong. Women nowadays are more educated and are as competitive as men due to gender equality. Women may thus place themselves over men. With the declined social status, the self-esteem of men has been dropping as well.

=== Parenting role ===
Helicopter parents who over-spoil (or control) their kids usually accommodate their children excessively. Parents assume all life decisions for them, including plans for their future, and take care of all of their affairs. Such over-doting leads to repercussions such as self-centredness, and lack of real-life personal ambitions.

== Responses from general public ==
Most people criticise the behaviour of 'Kong Girls' and 'Kong Boys'. There are many parodies, critics and even literature publicly denouncing them.

In the book 《港女聖經》(Bible of Kong Girls), 12 ‘sins’ committed by 'Kong Girls' are listed, including immaturity and materialism; A TV show, also interviewed Hong Kong guys on their perceptions on 'Kong Girls', which were negative.

In 2013, a video titled “Hong Kong Woman Slapping Boyfriends” was uploaded on YouTube. The video shows a couple arguing in an open street. The girl slapped her boyfriend fourteen times because she suspected he was having an affair. The incident caused great repercussions. Other than that the girl was said to be too radical, the boy was criticized by some male netizens that he was useless, that he should not have given up his dignity and even damaged the impression of Hong Kong boys.
