= HK Magazine =

English-language alternative weekly magazine

- Final issue cover
- Editor: Luisa Tam
- Frequency: Weekly
- Circulation: 50,000 (2013)
- First issue: June 1991; 35 years ago
- Final issue Number: 7 October 2016; 1,166
- Company: Alibaba Group (2016–present)
- Based in: Hong Kong
- Language: English
- Website: hk-magazine.com

HK Magazine was a free English-language alternative weekly published by HK Magazine Media Group in Hong Kong. Launched in 1991, it offered coverage of local affairs, social issues as well as entertainment listings. The 1000th issue was published in 2013, the same year that it was sold to the South China Morning Post (SCMP) group. The magazine printed its final issue on 7 October 2016. This was the third SCMP subsidiary to close since the takeover of the newspaper by the Alibaba Group.

== History ==
HK Magazine was founded by best friends Greg Duncan, Stephen Freeman and Gretchen Worth. In 1989, considering Hong Kong a suitable place to start a magazine, they decided to establish an English-language publication.

The first issue, called HK: the indispensable Hong Kong Guide, was published in June 1991 by the local private company Asia City Publishing Limited. It had 24 pages and claimed a circulation of 15,000. It continued to publish on a monthly basis until November 1992, when because of the ambiguity of the name and the change of the publisher's schedule, the magazine was renamed HK Magazine, and switched to a bi-weekly schedule for the next three years.

In September 1995, it became a weekly magazine.

On 27 March 2009, the magazine allowed the publication of an article from its columnist, writer Chip Tsao. His article War at Home alleges the Philippines to be a nation of servants and also claims China is the master. This triggered a massive outcry from the Filipino community in Hong Kong and outraged many across the Philippines. Tsao made a public apology three days later on 30 March 2009.

In 2013, it was reported that Asia City Media Group had sold its Hong Kong business, including HK Magazine and other titles, to South China Morning Post for a sum of HK$13 million. South China Morning Post, including HK Magazine, was sold to Alibaba Group in early 2016.

== Distribution ==
The magazine, which was audited by the Audit Bureau of Circulations, was free at around 900 venues including restaurants, bars, coffee shops, bookshops and retail stores. The distribution outlets were mostly concentrated in commercial business districts.

== Readership ==
The magazine claimed around 236,000 readers per week.

According to a survey conducted by HK Magazine in 2004, 87% of the readers were holders of at least one university degree and 75% earned more than HK$30,000 per month. (Source: HK Magazine 2004 Readership Survey, HK Magazine 2004 Distribution Survey).

== Contents ==
HK Magazine usually contained features about social issues, and articles about music, movies, fashion, dining and travel, etc. The main sections that appeared regularly in the magazine were:

- Upfront – The opening pages of the magazine, featuring humorous and usually satirical commentaries on current affairs.
- Letters – Letters from readers. There may be comments or thoughts about past issues of the magazine or opinions towards social issue, etc.
- Street talk – Interviews with ordinary Hong Kong people on their lifestyle and working environment, of persons of interest around town coinciding with special events they are taking part in.
- Features – Generally, there are two features in each issue, both covering local issues and sometimes foreign issues. The first one is usually on social, political and cultural issues and events. The second one usually covers events in everyday life.
- 852 – This section, named for Hong Kong's IDD code, is split into four sub-categories: Shopping, Dining, Travel, and Healthy and Beauty, with selected new items featured under Shopping, as well as resident weekly columnists each writing under last three sections. 852 also features reviews on restaurants around town every week, written anonymously.
- Listings – There are three different categories in this section:
  - Arts: Art-related events; split into sub-categories Stage and Exhibitions, which include concerts, opera, dances and other theatre shows. Includes interview features with personalities working in the arts.
  - Nightlife: Concerts, gigs, club events and happy hour listings. Includes reviews on newly opened bars and clubs around town or interviews with musicians and DJs. Also featuring a Nightlife column.
  - Film: Synopses and reviews of recently released or soon-to-be-released movies.
- First Person – A full-page interview with notable Hong Kong personalities, including politicians, entrepreneurs and celebrities.
- Classified – Attached as a separate booklet, containing classified advertisements and weekly column Mr. Know-It-All, who answers readers' questions.
- In every issue: comics, astrology, Savage Love column

== Online and tablet app ==
HK Magazine Online published content from the print edition and also contains a large archive of the magazine's articles from the last decade. Online exclusive content was also available, most notably the news section on its homepage.

In January 2013 HK launched its free iPad edition, followed by one for Android in February. The tablet apps offered a multimedia platform for readers of the magazine, with interactive content, videos and sound clips enhancing the reader's experience.

== Periodic supplements ==
- Restaurant Guide – A guide to restaurants in the city based on anonymous reviews published over the past year.
- Art Guide – Introduced for the first time in 2013, the Art Guide is a comprehensive supplement informing readers of art events as well as all major art galleries across Hong Kong.
- Wedding Guide – A complete guide on wedding planning, including venues and locations, gown designers, photographers, caterers, makeup and hair stylists and more.
- Health and Beauty Guide – Featuring the best of the city's health and beauty retailers and products, as well as spas and gyms.
- HK Eats – The best food and restaurants recommendations in Hong Kong as selected by editors.
- Christmas Shopping Guide – A round-up of Christmas sales and promotions around town as well as the best shops, boutiques, department stores and malls for Christmas gifts. Includes editor's selections on ideal gifts, from fashion to home decorations.

== Publisher ==
HK Magazine was published by the HK Magazine Media Group. Established on 10 February 1989 in Hong Kong, it produces a portfolio of free city living publications. Formerly known as Lucky Still Limited, the corporation changed its name to Asia City Publishing Limited on 23 May 1989; it underwent another name change to become Asia City Media Group in the 2000s. In 2013 it was acquired by South China Morning Post and named HK Magazine Media Group. It introduces new lifestyle to readers in different regions through an extensive portfolio of publications.

Others titles also published under HK Magazine Media Group are as follows.

- Where Hong Kong, an edition of the international travel magazine with titles in major cities and countries across the globe
- Where Chinese, catered to visitors from Mainland China and published in simplified Chinese characters
- The List, a bi-weekly women's magazine. Featuring a different theme every issue, the magazine offers an extensive listings section called Know and Tel where readers will find useful information, addresses and phone numbers for different shops and companies alike.

== Closure ==
On 28 September 2016 The South China Morning Post announced that the magazine's final issue would be released on 7 October 2016. This was the third SCMP subsidiary to close since the Alibaba Group takeover of the newspaper in early 2016, the first two being the 48 HOURS weekend magazine and the SCMP Chinese language edition. SCMP stated that some HK Magazine staff members might be reassigned within the SCMP group while "around five" may be laid off.

The closure of the magazine was mourned in Hong Kong as the loss of a "fun, independent and free-thinking" publication that blended entertainment listings with coverage of social and issues, such as Hong Kong's relationship with mainland China and LGBT rights. SCMP's decision to discontinue the publication has been viewed as part of a wider effort under Alibaba management to shift focus away from Hong Kong and onto mainland China, and to market that coverage to western readers overseas. The Alibaba acquisition of the newspaper aims to promote China in the west, with the group's executive vice chairman stating that foreigners "don’t really understand China and have the wrong perception of China". It has been noted that the Post, once famed for pursuing stories banned in mainland China, has become "markedly less critical of Beijing" in recent years.

Zach Hines, who worked at the magazine from 2005–2015 (serving as editor-in-chief from 2008), wrote of the closure:

"The South China Morning Post purchased us at the right time, and for sensible reasons. The media landscape was changing dramatically, as it continues to do, and their ownership bought us a few final years of life. But, like “One Country, Two Systems,” this odd and uncomfortable marriage was never going to last.

To be a truly independent press, you cannot be beholden to anyone except your readers. But, to my great dismay, this is becoming an increasing impossibility in Hong Kong, in both the mainstream Chinese and much-smaller English media. The SCMP itself is now owned by Alibaba, perhaps the biggest pro-China organization in the world, if you don’t count the Communist Party. The paper’s business interests are also drifting away from Hong Kong, and toward readers in the United States and the rest of the west. HK Magazine is a canary in the coal mine. [...]

As this sad end to HK Magazine shows, it is clear that it is time now for someone else to step up and provide an alternative voice for Hong Kong. If you care about free speech and the liberal values that make Hong Kong what it is, say something about it. Do something about it. Support independent outlets like Hong Kong Free Press and FactWire. You have a voice. Use it. Or you will surely lose it."

Initially SCMP stated that the HK Magazine website would be deleted from the internet. This received strong condemnation. The Hong Kong Journalists Association lodged an inquiry with SCMP management. Hines stated: "It is unthinkable that a newspaper of record would ever consider deleting content from its archive. The SCMP should be held to proper journalistic standards. HK Magazine was an important feature of Hong Kong’s media landscape, and it must be preserved. Deleting it would be an utter travesty of journalistic principles – and a slap in the face to SCMP’s readers and to Hong Kong society in general."

Following the negative reaction SCMP stated that HK Magazine content would be migrated to the South China Morning Post website before the HK Magazine website was deleted. Additionally, Hong Kong data scientist Mart van de Ven launched a public appeal to help archive back issues of the magazine, expressing doubt that SCMP would preserve the full archive. He found that he was unable to access issue 1,103, which featured Leung Chun-ying on the cover. An archive of HK Magazine's website just before closure is available at https://hkmag-archive.com/.

== See also ==
- Media in Hong Kong
