= Xing'an =

Xing'an (t 興安, s 兴安, Xīng'ān) is the atonal pinyin romanization of various Chinese words and names. It may refer to:

- Xing'an County in Guangxi
- Xing'an Province, a former division of Manchuria
- Xing'an District in Hegang, Heilongjiang
- Xing'an, Hebei, a town in Gaocheng District
- Xing'an, Heilongjiang, a town in Mohe

== See also ==
- Khingan (disambiguation), various mountain ranges in northern China and in Mongolia
- Hinggan (disambiguation), the Manchu form of the same name
- Ju‘lian Hinggang (disambiguation), various mountain ranges in the Tibetian area.
