= Written Cantonese =

Cantonese written tradition

- Script type: Logographic
- Period: 1910s (or earlier) to present
- Languages: Yue Chinese

Related scripts
- Sister systems: Written Hokkien

Written Cantonese is a written form of Cantonese that represents colloquial Cantonese vocabulary and grammar using Chinese characters. It shares many characters with standard written Chinese, but also uses characters for Cantonese-specific words and grammatical particles. Some of these represent older forms that have fallen out of common use, while others are borrowed or newly created characters used when an established form is unknown or unavailable. Usage is not fully standardized, and there remains disagreement over which characters are correct for some Cantonese words.

Written Cantonese has a literary history predating the modern period. Early examples occur in Cantonese mukjyusyu ("wooden fish books"); the earliest known such work containing elements of written Cantonese, Faazin Gei, was composed during the late Ming dynasty, with its oldest extant edition dating to 1713. By the 1920s, a well-recognised system of written Cantonese had developed in Cantonese opera libretti, and its visibility expanded further through the post-war Hong Kong film industry and the use of subtitles.

In modern Hong Kong, written Cantonese is used mainly in informal and colloquial contexts, including some tabloids, advertising, online chat, instant messaging, and social media, while standard written Chinese remains dominant in most formal writing. Its use outside Hong Kong is more limited, although colloquial written Cantonese also appears in Guangdong. Written texts range from forms closely resembling spoken Cantonese to mixtures of colloquial Cantonese and standard written Chinese. In the 1990s, the Hong Kong government sought to standardize Cantonese characters for electronic communication, culminating in the Hong Kong Supplementary Character Set, although disagreement over character forms remains.

Written Cantonese on the packaging of Hong Kong beverage brand Vitasoy

== History ==
=== Early history ===
Before the 20th century, the standard written language of China was Classical Chinese, with a grammar and vocabulary based on the Old Chinese of the Spring and Autumn period, of the 8th to the 5th century BCE. While this written standard remained essentially static for over two thousand years, the actual spoken language diverged ever further. The formation of Yue Chinese occurred among the Han population in the Pearl River Delta across many centuries, with the main linguistic influences being the Middle Chinese of the tenth century CE, corresponding to the end of the Tang dynasty, and that of the thirteenth century CE or late Song dynasty, as well as the Tai-Kadai substrate and some influence from pre-Tang Sinitic varieties.

The first Cantonese writings belong to a literary form specific to Canton, called mukjyusyu (木魚書, Jyutping: muk^{6} jyu^{4} syu^{1}, Hanyu Pinyin: mùyúshū, lit. 'wooden fish book'), that supposedly has its roots in Buddhist chants accompanied by wooden fish. Mukjyu texts were popular light reading, their primary audience were women, as female (and overall) literacy was unusually high in that region. The mukjyus were intended to be sung, similar to other genres such as naamyam, although without musical instruments.

The earliest known mukjyusyu work with elements of written Cantonese, Faazin Gei (花箋記, Jyutping: Faa^{1}zin^{1} Gei^{3}, Hanyu Pinyin: Huājiān Jì, lit. 'The Flowery Paper'), was composed by an unknown author during the late Ming dynasty; its oldest extant edition is dated to 1713. The Faazin Gei is an example of the "scholar and beauty" genre popular at the time, with its story set in Suzhou. Its text, while still being close to Literary Chinese, contains a lot of specific Cantonese wording and even Cantonese vernacular characters, especially in the dialogue sentences, but also in the narrative text. Other such renowned early works include Ji-Hofaa Si (二荷花史, Jyutping: Ji^{6} Ho^{4}faa^{1} Si^{2}, "The Two Lotus Flowers") and Gamso-Jyunjoeng Saanwusin Gei (金鎖鴛鴦珊瑚扇記, Jyutping: Gam^{1}so^{2} Jyun^{1}joeng^{1} Saan^{1}wu^{4}sin^{3} Gei^{3}, "Coral Fan and Golden-lock Mandarin-ducks Pendant").

The naamyam (南音; Jyutping: naam^{4} jam^{1}, Hanyu Pinyin: nányīn, literally "southern songs"), a genre of song that flourished from the late Ming dynasty and frequently sung in Canton's brothels with accompanying string instruments, possessed language that was generally very literary, with only occasional instances of colloquial Cantonese words. The purpose of such inclusions is debated; they were likely added purely for rhythmic purposes. An example of such practice is Haaktou Cauhan (客途秋恨, Jyutping: Haak^{3}tou^{4} Cau^{1}han^{6}, "The Traveler's Autumn Regrets") written in the first decade of 1800s, which is considered one of the most outstanding examples of the naamyam genre.

Written Cantonese vocabulary was used much more extensively in the lungzau (龍舟, Jyutping: lung^{4}zau^{1}, "Dragon boat") songs, performed mainly by beggars on the streets. These songs were considered the least prestigious genre and were rarely published, and then only after careful editing to make them less vernacular in style.

An important landmark in the history of written Cantonese was the publication of Jyut-au (粵謳, Jyutping: jyut^{6}au^{1}, Hanyu Pinyin: yuè'ōu, literally: "Cantonese love songs") by Zhao Ziyong (招子庸, Jyutping: Ziu^{1} Zi^{2}jung^{4}, Hanyu Pinyin: Zhāo Zǐyōng) in 1828, marking the beginning of an extremely popular genre. Being an educated juren, Zhao Ziyong earned some prestige and respect for the previously rejected "heavy" vernacular literature.

=== Modern times ===
In the early 20th century, Chinese reformers like Hu Shih saw the need for language reform and championed the development of a vernacular that allowed modern Chinese to write the language the same way they speak. The vernacular language movement took hold, and the written language was standardized as vernacular Chinese. Mandarin was chosen as the basis for the new standard.

The standardization and adoption of written Mandarin preempted the development and standardization of vernaculars based on other varieties of Chinese. No matter which dialect one spoke, they still wrote in standardized Mandarin for everyday writing. However, Cantonese is unique amongst the non-Mandarin varieties in having a widely used written form. Cantonese-speaking Hong Kong used to be a British colony isolated from mainland China before 1997, so most HK citizens do not speak Mandarin. Written Cantonese has developed as a means of informal communication. Still, Cantonese speakers must use standard written Chinese, or even literary Chinese, in most formal written communications, since written Cantonese may be unintelligible to speakers of other varieties of Chinese.

Written Cantonese banner advertising peanut and sesame brittles in mainland China, with the slogan "If you never eat it, you will never know how it tastes. The more you eat it, the more tasty it is"

By the 1920s, with the rise of fully written libretti (Chinese: 劇本; pinyin: jùběn; Jyutping: kek6 bun2) for Cantonese opera, a well-recognised system had arisen for the use of written Cantonese. The theatrical art form became popularised further through the 1950s with the post-war Hong Kong film industry, during which one third of all cinema production was devoted to Cantonese opera. With the consistent use of on-screen subtitles, the film-going audiences regularly encountered written Cantonese at the cinema, as well as on the backs of phonograph records and later audiocassette and CD cases.

Historically, written Cantonese has been used in Hong Kong for legal proceedings in order to write down the exact spoken testimony of a witness, instead of paraphrasing spoken Cantonese into standard written Chinese. However, its popularity and usage has been rising in the last two decades, the late Wong Jim being one of the pioneers of its use as an effective written language. Written Cantonese has become quite popular in certain tabloids, online chat rooms, instant messaging, and even social networking websites; this would be even more evident since the rise of localism in Hong Kong from the 2010s, where the articles written by those localist media are written in Cantonese. Although most foreign movies and TV shows are subtitled in Standard Chinese, some, such as The Simpsons, are subtitled using written Cantonese. Newspapers have the news section written in Standard Chinese, but they may have editorials or columns that contain Cantonese discourses, and Cantonese characters are increasing in popularity on advertisements and billboards.

It has been stated that written Cantonese remains limited outside Hong Kong, including other Cantonese-speaking areas in Guangdong Province. However, colloquial Cantonese advertisements are sometimes seen in Guangdong, suggesting that written Cantonese is widely understood and is regarded favourably, at least in some contexts. Attitudes toward written Cantonese in Guangzhou have been found to be in general positive, though this was limited to the informal and casual domains of life, where the social value of written Cantonese as a marker of cultural solidarity is highest.

Some sources will use only colloquial Cantonese forms, resulting in text similar to natural speech. However, it is more common to use a mixture of colloquial forms and standard Chinese forms, some of which are alien to natural speech. Thus the resulting "hybrid" text lies on a continuum between two norms: standard Chinese and colloquial Cantonese as spoken. It has been found that female gender and a middle class-income are demographic factors that promote a clear separation between standard written Chinese and written Cantonese. On the other hand, men, and both blue-collar workers and college-educated high-income demographics, are factors that tend towards a convergence to standard written Chinese.

== Cantonese characters ==
=== Early sources ===
A good source for well documented written Cantonese words can be found in the scripts for Cantonese opera. Readings in Cantonese colloquial: being selections from books in the Cantonese vernacular with free and literal translations of the Chinese character and romanized spelling (1894) by James Dyer Ball has a bibliography of printed works available in Cantonese characters in the last decade of the nineteenth century. A few libraries have collections of so-called "wooden fish books" written in Cantonese characters. Facsimiles and plot precis of a few of these have been published in Wolfram Eberhard's Cantonese Ballads. See also Cantonese love-songs, translated with introduction and notes by Cecil Clementi (1904) or a newer translation of these by Peter T. Morris in Cantonese love songs : an English translation of Jiu Ji-yung's Cantonese songs of the early 19th century (1992). Cantonese character versions of the Bible, Pilgrims Progress, and Peep of Day, as well as simple catechisms, were published by mission presses. The special Cantonese characters used in all of these were not standardized and show wide variation.

=== Characters today ===
A Hong Kong billboard in Written Cantonese with a mixture of English words in the typical code switch style of Hong Kong speech.

A Hong Kong political advertisement for Professional Commons in Written Cantonese

Political banner for the Democratic Alliance for the Betterment and Progress of Hong Kong in Written Cantonese

Written Cantonese contains many characters not used in standard written Chinese in order to transcribe words not present in the standard lexicon, and for some words from Old Chinese when their original forms have been forgotten. Despite attempts by the government of Hong Kong in the 1990s to standardize this character set, culminating in the release of the Hong Kong Supplementary Character Set (HKSCS) for use in electronic communication, there is still significant disagreement about which characters are correct in written Cantonese, as many of the Cantonese words existed as descendants of Old Chinese words, but are being replaced by some new invented Cantonese words.

=== Vocabulary ===
General estimates of vocabulary differences between Cantonese and Mandarin range from 30 to 50 percent. Donald B. Snow, the author of Cantonese as Written Language: The Growth of a Written Chinese Vernacular, wrote that "It is difficult to quantify precisely how different" the two vocabularies are. Snow wrote that the different vocabulary systems are the main difference between written Mandarin and written Cantonese. Ouyang Shan made a corpus-based estimate concluding that one third of the lexical items used in regular Cantonese speech do not exist in Mandarin, but that between the formal registers the differences were smaller. He analyzed a radio news broadcast and concluded that of its lexical items, 10.6% were distinctly Cantonese. Here are examples of differing lexical items in a sentence:

Written Cantonese and standard written Chinese equivalents with corresponding Jyutping romanization
Gloss	Written Cantonese	Standard Written Chinese
is	係 hai^{6}	是 si^{6} (Mandarin: shì)
not	唔 m^{4}	不 bat^{1} (Mandarin: bù)
they/them	佢哋 keoi^{5}-dei^{6}	他們 taa^{1}-mun^{4} (Mandarin: tāmen)
(possessive marker)	嘅 ge^{3}	的 dik^{1} (Mandarin: de)
Is it theirs?	係唔係佢哋嘅？ hai^{6}-m^{4}-hai^{6} keoi^{5}-dei^{6} ge^{3}?	是不是他們的？ Si^{6}-bat^{1}-si^{6} taa^{1}-mun^{4} dik^{1}? (Mandarin: Shì bùshì tāmen de?)

The two Chinese sentences are grammatically identical, using an A-not-A question to ask "Is it theirs?" (referring to an aforementioned object). Though the characters correspond 1:1, the actual glyphs used are all different.

=== Cognates ===
There are certain words that share a common root with standard written Chinese words. However, because they have diverged in pronunciation, tone, and/or meaning, they are often written using a different character. One example is the doublet 來 loi^{4} (standard) and 嚟 lei^{4} (Cantonese), meaning "to come." Both share the same meaning and usage, but because the colloquial pronunciation differs from the literary pronunciation, they are represented using two different characters. Some people argue that representing the colloquial pronunciation with a different (and often extremely complex) character is superfluous, and would encourage using the same character for both forms since they are cognates (see #Cantonese character classification below).

=== Native words ===
Some Cantonese words have no equivalents in Mandarin, though equivalents may exist in classical or other varieties of Chinese. Cantonese writers have from time to time reinvented or borrowed a new character if they are not aware of the original one. For example, some suggest that the common word 靚 leng^{3}, meaning pretty in Cantonese but also looking into the mirror in Mandarin, is in fact the character 令 ling^{3}.

Today those characters can mainly be found in ancient rime dictionaries such as Guangyun. Some scholars have made some "archaeological" efforts to find out what the "original characters" are. Often, however, these efforts are of little use to the modern Cantonese writer, since the characters so discovered are not available in the standard character sets provided to computer users, and many have fallen out of usage.

In Southeast Asia, Cantonese people may adopt local Malay words into their daily speech, such as using the term 鐳 leoi^{1} to mean money rather than 錢 cin^{2}, which would be used in Hong Kong.

More examples of native vocabulary are provided in the section below: Classification of Cantonese characters.

=== Particles ===
Cantonese particles may be added to the end of a sentence or suffixed to verbs to indicate aspect. There are many such particles; here are a few.

- 咩 – "me^{1}" is placed at the end of a sentence to indicate disbelief, e.g. 乜你花名叫八兩金咩？ Is your nickname really Raymond Lam?
- 呢 – "ne^{1}" is placed at the end of a sentence to indicate a question, e.g. 你叫咩名呢？ What is your name?
- 未 – "mei^{6}" is placed at the end of a sentence to ask if an action is done yet, e.g. 你做完未？ Are you done yet?
- 吓 – "haa^{5}" is placed after a verb to indicate a little bit, e.g. 食吓 Eat a little bit; "haa^{2}" is used singly to show uncertainty or unbelief, e.g. 吓？乜係咁㗎? What? Is that so?
- 緊 – "gan^{2}" is placed after a verb to indicate a progressive action, e.g. 我食緊蘋果。 I'm eating an apple.
- 咗 – "zo^{2}" placed after a verb to indicate a completed action, e.g. 我食咗蘋果。 I ate an apple.
- 晒 – "saai^{3}" placed after a verb to indicate an action to all of the targets, e.g. 我食晒啲蘋果。 I ate all the apples.
- 埋 – "maai^{4}" is placed after a verb to indicate an expansion of the target of action, or that the action is an addition to the one(s) previously mentioned, e.g. 我食埋啲嘢就去。 I'll go after I finish eating the rest. ("eating the rest" is an expansion of the target of action from the food eaten to the food not yet eaten); 你可以去先，我食埋嘢先去。 You can go first. I'll eat before going. (The action "eating" is an addition to the action "going" which is previously mentioned or mutually known.)
- 哇/嘩 – "waa^{1} / waa^{3}" interjection of amazement, e.g. 嘩！好犀利呀！ Wow! That's amazing!
- 㗎啦 – "gaa^{3} laa^{1}" is used when the context seems to be commonplace, e.g., 個個都係咁㗎啦。 Everyone is like that.
- 啫嘛 – "ze^{1} maa^{3}" translates as "just", e.g. 我就剩兩頁功課啫嘛。 I just have two pages of homework left to do.

=== Loanwords ===
Some Cantonese loanwords are written in existing Chinese characters.

Examples
Written Cantonese	Jyutping	Cantonese pronunciation	English word	English Pronunciation	Written Mandarin
巴士	baa^{1} si^{2}	/paː˥ɕiː˧˥/	bus	/bʌs/	公車 (Taiwan) 公共汽車、公交車 (Mainland China)
的士	dik^{1} si^{2}	/tɪk˥ɕiː˧˥/	taxi	/ˈtæksi/	計程車 (Taiwan) 出租車 (Mainland China) 德士 (Singapore/Malaysia)
多士	do^{1} si^{6}	/tɔ˥ːɕi˨ː/	toast	/ˈtɘʊst/	吐司
朱古力	zyu^{1} gu^{1} lik^{1}	/tɕyː˥kuː˥lɪk˥/	chocolate	/ˈtʃɒklɪt/	巧克力
三文治	saam^{1} man^{4} zi^{6}	/saːm˥mɐn˨˩tɕiː˨/	sandwich	/ˈsænwɪdʒ/	三明治
士多	si^{6} do^{1}	/ɕiː˨tɔː˥/	store	/stɔː/	商店
士巴拿	si^{6} baa^{1} naa^{2}	/ɕiː˨paː˥naː˧˥/	spanner (wrench)	/ˈspæn.ə(ɹ)/	扳手
士多啤梨	si^{6} do^{1} be^{1} lei^{2}	/ɕiː˨tɔː˥pɛː˥lei˧˥/	strawberry	/ˈstrɔːbəri/	草莓
啤梨	be^{1} lei^{2}	/pɛː˥lei˧˥/	pear	/peər/	梨子
沙士	saa^{1} si^{6}	/saː˥ɕiː˨/	SARS	/sɑːz/	嚴重急性呼吸道症候群 非典 (Mainland China)
拜拜	baai^{1} baai^{3}	/paːi˥paːi˧/	bye bye	/ˈbaɪbaɪ/	再見
BB	bi^{4} bi^{1}	/piː˨˩piː˥/	baby	/ˈbeɪbi/	嬰兒
菲林	fei^{1} lam^{2}	/fei˥lɐm˧˥/	film	/fɪlm/	膠卷
菲屎	fei^{1} si^{2}	/fei˥ɕiː˧˥/	face (reputation)	/feɪs/	面子
三文魚	saam^{1} man^{4} jyu^{4}	/saːm˥mɐn˨˩jyː˨˩/	salmon	/ˈsæmən/	鮭魚
沙律	saa^{1} leot^{6}	/sa˥ːlɵ˨t̚/	salad	/ˈsæləd/	沙拉
褒呔	bou^{1} taai^{1}	/po˥utʰa˥ːi/	bowtie	/bəʊˈtaɪ/	蝴蝶型領結
飛	fei^{1}	/fei˥/	fee (ticket)	/fiː/	票
波	bo^{1}	/pɔ˥ː/	ball	/bɔːl/	球
哈囉	haa^{1} lou^{3}	/ha˥ːlou˧/	hello	/həˈləʊ/	哈囉
迷你	mai^{4} nei^{2}	[mɐj˩.nej˧˥]	mini	/ˈmɪni/	小
摩登	mo^{1} dang^{1}	/mɔː˥tɐŋ˥/	modern	/ˈmɒdən/	時尚、現代
肥佬	fei^{4} lou^{2}	[fej˩lɔw˧˥]	fail	/feɪl/	不合格
咖啡	gaa^{3} fe^{1}	/kaː˧fɛː˥/	coffee	/ˈkɒfi/	咖啡
OK	ou^{1} kei^{1}	/ʔou˥kʰei˥/	okay	/ˌəʊˈkeɪ/	可以
咭	kaak^{1}	/kʰaːk̚˥/	card	/kɑːd/	卡
啤牌	pe^{1} paai^{2}	/pʰɛː˥ pʰaːi˧˥/	poker	/ˈpəʊkə/	樸克
基	gei^{1}	/kei˥/	gay	/ɡeɪ/	同性戀
(蛋)撻	(daan^{6}) taat^{1}	(/taːn˨/) /tʰaːt̚˥/	(egg) tart	/tɑːt/	(蛋)塔
可樂	ho^{2} lok^{6}	/hɔ˧˥ː.lɔːk̚˨/	cola	/ˈkəʊ.lə/	可樂
檸檬	ning^{4} mung^{1}	[nɪŋ˩mɪŋ˥]	lemon	/ˈlɛmən/	檸檬
扑成	buk^{1} sing^{4}	[pʊk̚˥.sɪŋ˩]	boxing	/ˈbɒksɪŋ/	拳擊
刁時	diu^{1} si^{2}	[tiw˥.si˧˥]	deuce		(before the final game of tennis) 平分
干邑	gon^{1} jap^{1}	[kɔn˥.jɐp̚˥]	cognac		法國白蘭地酒
沙展	saa^{1} zin^{2}	[sa˥.tsin˧˥]	sergeant		警長
士碌架	si^{3} luk^{1} gaa^{2}	[si˧lʊk̚˥.ka˧˥]	snooker		彩色檯球
士撻(打)	si^{3} taat^{1} (daa^{2})	[si˧.tʰat̚˥ ta˧˥]	starter		啟輝器
士啤	si^{3} be^{1}	[si˧.pɛ˥]	spare		後備，備用
士啤呔	si^{3} be^{1} taai^{1}	[si˧.pɛ˥ tʰaj˥]	spare tire		備用輪胎; Often used to describe people with waist and abdomen fat
士的	si^{3} dik^{1}	[si˧.tɪk̚˥]	stick		手杖，拐杖
士多房	si^{3} do^{1} fong^{4}	[si˧.tɔ˥ fɔŋ˩]	storeroom		貯藏室
山埃	saan^{1} aai^{1}	[san˥ ʔaj˥]	cyanide		氰化物
叉(電)	caa^{1} (din^{3})	[tsʰa˥.tin˧]	(to) charge		充電
六式碼	luk^{3} sik^{1} maa^{2}	[lʊk̚˧.sɪk̚˥ ma˧˥]	Six Sigma		六西格瑪
天拿水	tin^{1} naa^{4} seoi^{2}	[tʰin˥na˩ sɵɥ˧˥]	(paint) thinner		稀釋劑，溶劑
比高	bei^{2} gou^{1}	[pej˧˥kɔw˥]	bagel		過水麵包圈 (Mainland China) 貝果 (Taiwan)
比堅尼	bei^{2} gin^{1} nei^{4}	[pej˧˥kin˥nej˩]	bikini		比基尼泳裝
巴士德消毒	baa^{1} si^{1} dak^{1} siu^{1} duk^{6}	/paː˥.si˥ tɐk̚˥.siːu˥.tʊk̚˨/	pasteurized		用巴氏法消毒過的
巴打	baa^{1} daa^{2}	[pa˥.ta˧˥]	brother		兄弟
巴黎帽	baa^{1} lai^{4} mou^{2}	[pa˥lɐj˩mɔw˧˥]	beret		貝雷帽
巴仙	baa^{1} sin^{1} / pat^{6} sen^{1}	[pa˥sin˥] / /pʰɐt̚˨.sɛːn˥/	percent		百分之 趴(Taiwan)
古龍水	gu^{2} lung^{4} seoi^{2}	[ku˧˥.lʊŋ˩ sɵɥ˧˥]	cologne		科隆香水 (Mainland China)
布冧	bou^{3} lam^{1}	[pɔw˧lɐm˥]	plum		洋李，李子，梅
布甸	bou^{3} din^{1}	[pɔw˧.tin˥]	pudding		布丁
打令	daa^{1} ling^{2}	[ta˥.lɪŋ˧˥]	darling		心愛的人
打比(打吡)	daa^{2} bei^{2}	[ta˧˥.pej˧˥]	derby		德比賽馬
卡	kaa^{1}	[kʰa˥]	car		（火車）車廂
卡式機	kaa^{1} sik^{1} gei^{1}	[kʰa˥.sɪk̚˥ kej˥]	cassette		盒式錄音機
卡士	kaa^{1} si^{2}	[kʰa˥.si˧˥]	1. cast 2. class		1. 演員陣容; 2. 檔次，等級；上品，高檔，有品味
卡通	kaa^{1} tung^{1}	[kʰa˥.tʰʊŋ˥]	cartoon		動畫片，漫畫
卡巴	kaa^{1} baa^{1}	[kʰa˥.pa˥]	kebab		烤腌肉串
甲巴甸	gaap^{3} baa^{1} din^{1}	[kap̚˧.pa˥.tin˥]	gabardine		華達呢
呢	le^{1}	[lɛ˥]	level		級，級別
叻㗎	lek^{1} gaa^{4}	[lɛk̚˥.ka˩]	lacquer		清漆
仙	sin^{1}	[sin˥]	cent		分
他菲亞酒	taa^{1} fei^{1} aa^{3} zau^{2}	[tʰa˥.fej˥ ʔa˧.tsɐw˧˥]	tafia		塔非亞酒
冬甩	dung^{1} lat^{1}	[tʊŋ˥.lɐt̚˥]	doughnut		炸麵餅圈 (Mainland China)
奶昔	naai^{2} sik^{1}	[naj˧˥.sɪk̚˥]	milkshake		牛奶冰淇淋
安士	on^{1} si^{2}	[ʔɔn˥si˧˥]	ounce		盎司，英兩，啢
安哥	on^{1} go^{1}	[ʔɔn˥kɔ˥]	encore		再來一個，再演奏（Song）一次

== Classification of Cantonese characters ==
Characters used to write colloquial Cantonese can be classified into one of several types:

=== Shared-character Cognates ===
Refers to characters that are used in both Standard Mandarin Chinese and Cantonese, with the Cantonese meaning sharing the same root or etymology with the Mandarin meaning, although differing slightly in meaning.

Character	Jyutping	Meaning in Written Cantonese	Literal Meaning in Standard Mandarin Chinese	Notes
仔	zai^{2}	pron. child, boy	"young animal"	
係	hai^{5}	copular verb, to be, is, am, are	"to be relevant to, to tie"	
係	hai^{5}	affirmation. yes	"to be relevant to, to tie"	
住	zyu^{6}	continuous aspect marker, used to indicate an ongoing action or a current state (e.g. 我戴住眼鏡 "I'm wearing glasses"	"to stay"	from the sense that the verb is still "staying" in action
使	sai^{2}	v. to need; typically used in words like 唔使 "no need"	"to cause something to happen"	
估	gu^{2}	v. to guess	"to estimate"	
喊	haam^{3}	v. to cry	"to shout"	
愛	oi^{1}	v. to want	"to love"	
整	zing^{2}	v. to do, to make, to fix	"to gather, to make tidy, whole"	
曉	hiu^{2}	v. to know	"dawn"	from a figurative sense of 曉; "dawn" -> "to understand"
除	ceoi^{4}	v. to take off (clothes or accessories)	"to remove, to exclude, (arithmetic) to divide"	
掉	deu^{6}	v. to throw away	"to fall"	
搞	gaau^{2}	v. to play with	"to do (usually bad things)"	
擠	zai^{1}	v. to place	"to squeeze"	probably from the sense of "to squeeze into place"
鍾	zung^{1}	used in "鍾意“; v. to like; also written as "中意"	"vessel for containing alcohol"	from a figurative sense of 鍾; "vessel" -> "to concentrate one's love or attention"; alternatively, from 中意 "to be of one's liking"
嬲	nau^{1}/lau^{1}	v. to be annoyed at; to be angry at	"to make fun of; to pester"	
鬧	naau^{6}/laau^{6}	v. to scold	"to be noisy"	
慳	haan^{1}	v. to save (usually money)	"stingy"	
岋	ngap^{6}	used in "岋頭/岌頭"; v. to nod; also written as "岌"	"shaky"	from the sense of "shaking your head"
笠	lap^{1}	v. to cover (with), to put on (clothes)	"Asian conical hat"	from the sense of "putting on a hat", later adapted to mean "to cover (with), to put on (clothes)"
企	kei^{5}	v. to stand	short for 企业 "enterprise" , also used in compounds such as 企望 ”to hope for", 企图 "to attempt to".	from the original meaning of 企 "to to stand on one's tiptoes"; may also be related to "徛"
褪	tan^{3}	v. to back away	"to take off one's clothes; to discolour; to fade"	linguist 孔仲南 explained in his 1933 book《廣東俗語考》that when people took off traditional Chinese garments in the past, they always did so by slipping the clothes backward off their shoulders, hence "褪" was colloquially adapted to mean "retreating" or "stepping back".
惹	je^{5}	v. to attract (an animal)	"to cause a problem, to provoke"	
惹	je^{5}	v. to infect	"to cause a problem, to provoke"	
執	zap^{1}	v. to pick up	"to hold"	
執	zap^{1}	v. to tidy up	"to hold"	
執	zap^{1}	v. to close down (e.g. 執笠 "to go bankrupt and close down")	"to hold"	
執	zap^{1}	classifier, a pinch of something	"to hold"	
吟沉	ngam^{4} cam^{4}	v. to mutter or grumble	"chant submerge"	
度	dou^{6}	n. place	"degree"	
細	sai^{3}	adj. small	"thin"	
平	peng^{4}	adj. cheap	"flat"	平 also means "fair" in Mandarin, so the meaning of "cheap" probably stemmed from "fair", as in "fair price"
耐	noi^{6}/loi^{6}	adj. taking a long time to happen	"to endure"	
衰	seoi^{1}	adj. awful	"to grow week, to decline"	
成	sing^{4}	adj. entire	"to become"	成 also means "to complete" and "to reach a certain level of"
成	sing^{4}	adv. almost, nearly	"to become"	成 also means "to complete" and "to reach a certain level of"
齊	cai^{4}	adv. together	"identical, complete"	
先	sin^{1}	adv. only then, as in 我做嗮先幫你 "Once I have finished, only then will I help you"	"first"	the word 先 is used differently in some southern Chinese languages. In Standard Mandarin, 先 comes before the verb, whereas in Cantonese and Teochew, it comes after the verb. For example in Standard Chinese, one would say 我先做完后帮你 "I'll first do finish, then i'll help you", whereas in Cantonese one world say 我做嗮先幫你 "I'll do finish first, then i'll help you". Therefore, "先" in Cantonese can be understood as "only then", and is also therefore a synonym to the Chinese "才".
邊	bin^{1}	interrogative word, which, where, how	"a side"	In some chinese varieties, certain interrogative words may ultimately originate from nouns of location.
啖	daam^{6}	classifier, a mouthful	"to eat"	
啖	daam^{6}	classifier, for kisses	"to eat"	
拃	zaa^{6}	classifier, a handful of	"a handspan"	

=== Loangraphs ===
Most commonly refers to characters that were borrowed into Cantonese for their pronunciation (a phonetic loan character, 語音假借字). Since Cantonese was historically a spoken rather than a written language, the original characters created for many native Cantonese words have largely been lost to time. Consequently, when speakers sought to represent the language in writing, they often adopted substitute characters with identical or similar pronunciations. Alternatively, some Cantonese words may not have had original written characters created for it to begin with, necessitating the borrowing of existing characters as substitutes.

Character	Jyutping	Meaning in Written Cantonese	Literal Meaning in Standard Mandarin Chinese	Etymology	Alternative Characters
呢	ni^{1}/nei^{1}/li^{1}/ji^{1}	demonstrative pronoun. this	sentence final particle with many uses	substrate word, compare: Proto-Austronesian *nay, *qani, *-ni; Malay ini (“this”); Proto-Tai *najꟲ; Zhuang neix (“this”); Thai นี้ (níi, “this”); Lao ນີ້ (nī, “this”); Proto-Mon-Khmer *niʔ ~ nih; Khmer នេះ (nih, “this”); Proto-Mon-Khmer *naaj; Khmer នាយ (niəy, “over there”); Vietnamese này, nầy (“this”); Vietnamese nay (“now”); Vietnamese nấy (“that”); Proto-Hmong-Mien *ʔneinˣ; White Hmong no (“here, this”)	哩 (when pronounced as "li^{1}") 依 or 𠵱 (when pronounced as "ji^{1}")
吓	haa^{6}	adv. a brief moment	"to scare" (in Simplified Chinese)	variant writing of 下 "haa^{6}" as in "一下"	下
吓	haa^{6}	adj. quite	"to scare" (in Simplified Chinese)	variant writing of 下 "haa^{6}" as in "一下"	下
吓	haa^{6}	sentence final particle, indicates a question	"to scare" (in Simplified Chinese)	-	-
點	dim^{2}	adv. how	"a dot, a point, a drop, a little, to mention, to count, to select, to nod, to light, o'clock"	from the contraction of 底物 "dai^{2} mat^{6}", meaning "what thing?"	嚸
尋	cam^{4}/kam^{4}	used in compounds such as "尋日", prep. yesterday	"to search"	probably a contraction of 昨暝 "zok^{3} ming^{6}" (pronounced "cha-mî" in neighboring Southern Min languages) or 昨晚 "zok^{3} maan5" (pronounced "cha-mńg" in neighboring Southern Min languages)	噚 琴 (when pronounced as "kam^{4}")
緊	gan^{2}	progressive aspect marker, used to indicate an ongoing action that is not yet finished (e.g. 我讀緊書 "I'm reading a book")	"tight; to worry"	probably an apocope of 近處 "gan^{6} cyu^{3}", which was used to indicate that something was happening soon, but later came to be understood as something that was ongoing and not yet finished	𡁵
響	hoeng^{2}	v. / prep. to be at; at	"to ring; to sound"	from 向 "MC xjangH"	响
仲	zung^{6}	adv. still	"second in seniority"	from 重 "MC drjowngH" or 尚 "MC dzyangH"	重
聽	ting^{1}	used in "聽日"; n. / adv. tomorrow	"to listen"	uncertain, possible origins: From elision of 天光日 "MC then kwang nyit"; From 天日 "MC then nyit", where the final -n in 天 has assimilated with 日, which used to have a /ɲ̟/ initial.	𪢧
企	kei^{5}	used in "屋企" n. a house	short for 企业 "enterprise" , also used in compounds such as 企望 ”to hope for", 企图 "to attempt to".	probably from taboo avoidance of Hakka "屋下" (vuk-khâ), replacing "下" with "起 hei^{2}“, which came to be written as ”企“, likely due to a pronunciation shift	㖉
批	pai^{1}	v. to cut into thin slices, to peel (fruits), to shape with a knife or blade	to judge, to approve, to criticize, to slap, or classifier for batches of something	from 𠜱 "MC phej" or 劈 "MC phek"	㓟
攝	sip^{3}	v. to tuck in	to absorb, to take a photograph	compare Wuming Zhuang saeb (“to insert into a gap”), Hlai nyiep "to insert into a gap”).	𤗈 𠓼
杰	git^{6}	adj. viscous	used in personal names, e.g. "周杰伦"	probably a Kra-Dai substrate, compare Zhuang gwd (“viscous”), Bouyei geg (“viscous”), Lingao kɔt⁸ (“viscous”), also cognate with Fuzhou Eastern Min 𬇴 (gṳ̆k, “viscous”) and Teochew 𫀸 (geg8, “viscous”).	傑 滐 𠹳
錫	sek^{3}	v. to love dearly; to kiss	tin	From 惜 "sek^{3}"	惜
督	duk^{1}	v. to poke; prod	篤: "sincere" 督: "to supervise"	from 厾, 𧰵, or 㧻	篤
督	duk^{1}	classifier, for faeces	篤: "sincere" 督: "to supervise"	from 㞘, 𡱂, 𡰪, or 䐁	篤
督	duk^{1}	used in "尾篤/尾督"; n. the very back	篤: "sincere" 督: "to supervise"	from 㞘, 𡱂, 𡰪, or 䐁	篤
梗	gang^{2}	adv. certainly; definitely adj. stiff, fixed	"stem; stalk"	probably from 亙 "MC kongH" ("completely; thoroughly")	-
盲	mang^{4}	used in compounds such as "盲塞"; adj. describes someone who is old-fashioned and refuses to listen no matter how much they're told.	"blind"	from 㒼 "MC man" ("covered evenly and tightly")	-
埋	maai^{4}	v. to approach	"to bury", also used in 埋怨 "to grumble about; to complain"	probably from 摩 "MC ma, maH" ("to approach, to draw near")	𠹺
埋	maai^{4}	v. to close off	"to bury", also used in 埋怨 "to grumble about; to complain"	probably from 摩 "MC ma, maH" ("to approach, to draw near")	𠹺
埋	maai^{4}	adv. close to; e.g. 坐埋一齊 "sit close together"	"to bury", also used in 埋怨 "to grumble about; to complain"	probably from 摩 "MC ma, maH" ("to approach, to draw near")	𠹺
埋	maai^{4}	adv. away; e.g. 收埋 "to hide away"	"to bury", also used in 埋怨 "to grumble about; to complain"	probably from 摩 "MC ma, maH" ("to approach, to draw near")	𠹺
埋	maai^{4}	adv. to completion; e.g. 食埋啲飯 "to eat the rest of the rice"	"to bury", also used in 埋怨 "to grumble about; to complain"	probably from 摩 "MC ma, maH" ("to approach, to draw near")	𠹺
埋	maai^{4}	adv. as well; e.g. 加埋呢個 ”add this as well"	"to bury", also used in 埋怨 "to grumble about; to complain"	probably from 摩 "MC ma, maH" ("to approach, to draw near")	𠹺
谷	guk^{1}	v. to pressure	"valley"	unknown	唂
谷	guk^{1}	v. to strain while defecating	"valley"	unknown	唂
項	hong^{6-2}	used in "雞項"; n. a female chick that has not laid eggs	"item; neck"	from Proto-Tai *C̬.qɤːŋᴮ (“young hen”); compare Zhuang gaeqhangh, Bouyei gaishaangh.	𣚺
陸	luk^{6}	used in "豬陸"; n. a pigsty	"land; mainland; continent"	a Kra-Dai substrate word, compare Thai คอก (kɔ̂ɔk, “pen; coop”) and Lingao luk⁸ (“pen”)	樚
淨間	zing^{6} gaan^{1}	adv. a while	"clean between"	variant pronunciation of 陣間 "zan^{6} gaan1"	-
傾偈	king^{1} gai^{2}	v. to chat	"to pour out gatha"	possibly from 謦欬 "MC khengX khojH", also could just be from surface analysis of the characters themselves: 傾 (“to pour out" > "to chat") 偈 ("gatha" > "words")	-
論盡	leon^{6} zeon^{6}	adj. clumsy	"discuss finish"	probably from 遴鈍 "MC linH dwonH" 遴: "difficulty in travel" 鈍: "dull-witted"	遴迍
巴閉	baa^{1} bai^{3}	adj. arrogant	"desire close"	uncertain, possibly from Hindi बाप रे (baap re) "Oh my god"	-
巴閉	baa^{1} bai^{3}	adj. impressive	"desire close"	uncertain, possibly from Hindi बाप रे (baap re) "Oh my god"	-
奄尖	jim^{1} zim^{1}	adj. picky; fussy	"sudden sharp"	possibly a Kra-Dai substrate word, maybe cognate with Zhuang "yimxcimx"	㤿憸
核突	wat^{6} dat^{6}	adj. disgusting	"nuclear sudden"	perhaps from 鶻突 "MC kwot/hwot/hweat dwot/thwot" ("unclear")	鶻突
撈哨	laau^{4} saau^{4}	adj. dressed untidily, sloppily	"to fish out whistle"	probably from 髝髞 "MC law/lawH sawH", a term used to describe something that was tall, or someone that had a rough temper, later evolving to describe the appearance of messy hair, from which the meaning of "dressed untidily" is derived	髝髞
咧啡	le^{4} fe^{4}	adj. dressed untidily, sloppily	-	uncertain; from 褦裶 "MC nojH phj+j"? 褦: "foolish" 裶: "the appearance of long clothes"	哩啡
拿渣	laa^{5} zaa^{2}	adj. dirty	"to take fragments"/ "to break preserved fish"	from 藞苴 "MC laeX dzrae"	揦鮓
鹹濕	haam^{4} sap^{1}	adj. lecherous, lewd	"salty wet"	uncertain, many possible origins	-
屎忽	si^{2} fat^{1}	n. buttocks	"poop suddenly"	variant writing of 屎窟	屎窟
雲吞	wan^{4} tan^{1}	n. wonton (Chinese stuffed dumpling)	"cloud swallow"	from 餛飩 "MC hwon dwon"	餛飩
蘇蝦	sou^{1} haa^{1}	n. a baby	"perilla shrimp"	from 臊孲 "MC saw 'ae"	臊孲
馬騮	ma^{5} lau^{1}	n. a monkey	"a horse that is a bay horse with a black mane and a black tail"	unknown, possible origins: A Kra-Dai substrate cognate with Zhuang maxlaeuz, Lingao ma² lu², and Gelao mu⁶ lau², all meaning "monkey"; From Proto-Sino-Tibetan *m(j/r)uk. Cognate with Burmese မျောက် myauk “monkey” and possibly 猱 (OC *nˤu)"yellow-haired monkey”	嗎嘍
蠄蟧	kam^{4} lou^{4}/kam^{4} lou^{4-2}	n. a spider	"a type of insect which is a hermit crab"	borrowed from a Tai language, compare Proto-Tai *krwaːwᴬ (“spider”) > Zhuang gyau, duzgyau, gungqgyau, Shan ၵူင်ႇၵၢဝ် (kùung kǎao), White Hmong kab laum sab	-
運吉	wan^{6} gat^{1}	adj. a waste of time	"to transport lucky"	variant writing of 混吉, theories of origin include: Originating from a Hong Kong café in the 1970s. At the time, waiters would serve customers a free bowl of plain soup called “Lucky Soup” (吉湯) as soon as they sat down. Because the economy was poor, some people would drink the free soup and leave without ordering anything. Waiters called these people “混吉”, meaning "freeloading off the lucky soup; freeloaders"; Originating from a Guangzhou restaurant in the 1960s. The restaurant gave customers free plain chicken soup, but since the word “plain, empty” (空) sounded like 凶 (inauspicious), they changed the name to “Lucky Water” (吉水). Some customers would drink the free soup and leave immediately, so waiters began calling this behavior “混吉”	混吉
麻麻地	maa^{4} maa^{2} dei^{2}	adj. so-so, mediocre	"hemp hemp land"	unknown	嘛嘛哋

There is also one other type of loangraph, that being of a character borrowed into Cantonese for its meaning rather than its pronunciation (a semantic loan character, 語意假借字), an example being "歪 waai^{1}", meaning "slanted, crooked", which acts as the character for the colloquial Cantonese word "me^{2}", also meaning "slanted, crooked". The origin of this term is believed by Cantonese linguist Mai Yun (麦耘) to be from "佊 (MC pjeX)", which means "evil, crooked person".

=== Phono-semantic Compounds ===
The majority of characters used in Standard Mandarin Chinese are phono-semantic compounds – characters formed using two parts, or radicals; one hinting at its meaning, and one hinting at its pronunciation. Written Cantonese continues this practice, most often via putting the "mouth" radical 口 (which indicates that it is a colloquial word, or that the word's meaning is related to the human mouth) next to a character that indicates its pronunciation. As an example, the character 噉 uses the mouth radical with a 敢, which means "brave", but has no relation to the meaning of the character 噉 and only indicates it's pronunciation. An exception is 咩, which is not pronounced like its radical 羊 (joeng^{4}); 羊 means "sheep" and was chosen as the radical of 咩 because the pronunciation of the character 咩 (me^{1}) resembles the sound that sheep make.

Character	Jyutping	Meaning	Standard Mandarin Chinese Equivalent	Alternative Characters
啲	di^{1}	a bit, a bit more; e.g. "快啲" ("Faster!")	点, 些	尐 滴
嘅	ge^{3}	possessive particle, similar to 's	的	-
嘅	ge^{3}	sentence final particle, expresses agreement or surprise	的	-
吖	a^{1}	sentence final particle, dialectical form of 啊 or 呀	啊, 呀	-
㗎	gaa^{2}/gaa^{3}/gaa^{4}	sentence final particle, contraction of 嘅啊, 嘅呀, or 嘅吖	的啊, 的呀	-
喇	laa^{3}	sentence final particle, indicates a change of state/the beginning of an action or expresses surprise	了, 了啊	啦
嚹	laa^{3}	sentence final particle	了, 了啊	啦
嘞	laak^{3}	sentence final particle, used for confirmation or expresses polite refusal	的, 了	啦
喔	wo^{1}	sentence final particle, indicating surprise	哦	-
喎	wo^{3}	sentence final particle, used as a casual reminder or for emphasis, to express realization, to emphasise a truth that contradicts an incorrect assumption, to express sarcasm, or used for reported speech	哦	-
噃	bo^{3}	sentence final particle, used to assert something or to express strong appreciation and/or praise	哦	𡃓
啩	gwaa^{3}	sentence final particle, indicating uncertainty	吧	呱
嗬	ho^{2}	sentence final particle, used to ask for confirmation; for example in "你今晚會嚟嗰個晚會㗎嗬?" ("You're coming to the party tonight, right?")	-	呵
啫	ze^{1}	sentence final particle, only, simply	而已, 罢了	嗻
啫	ze^{1}	sentence final particle, used to form critical questions, e.g. "你今日去邊度啫?" ("Where exactly did you go to today?")	了	-
咋	zaa^{3}	sentence final particle, only, simply	而已, 罢了	-
咋	zaa^{4}	sentence final particle, used to ask for confirmation, expressing surprise and suspicion on a delimitation: "only so few/little?"; e.g. "仲有三個咋?" ("Are there only three left?")	而已?, 罢了?	-
囉	lo^{1}/lo^{3}	sentence final particle, used to indicate that something should be obvious	-	咯 囖
囉	lo^{1}/lo^{3}	sentence final particle, used to express impatience; for example in "快啲咁多囉" ("Hurry up!")	-	咯 囖
囉	lo^{1}/lo^{3}	sentence final particle, used to invite agreement or sympathy; for example in "我唔知點算好囉" ("I really don't know what do to...")	-	咯 囖
囉	lo^{1}/lo^{3}	sentence final particle, used to indicate a change or a new situation	了	咯 囖
㖭	tim^{1}	sentence final particle, used to express surprise	-	添 𠻹
噉	gam^{2}	function word, like this, e.g. "噉就死喇" ("Well, in that case, we're done for!")	这样	-
咗	zo^{2}	function word, indicates past tense	了	-
咩	me^{1}	function word , also a contraction of 乜嘢	吗	-
哋	dei^{6}	function word, indicates the plural form of a pronoun	们	-
嗮	saai^{3}	function word, marker for full extent; e.g. "搬嗮" ("moved all, finished moving")	完了	-
嚫	can^{1}	function word, used after a verb to indicate a negative consequence; e.g. “畀人打嚫” ("to get hit")	-	-
嚫	can^{1}	function word, used after a verb with 都 to indicate every time the action occurs; e.g. "佢飲嚫酒都會出事" ("He causes problems every time he get his hands on alcohol")	-	-
咪	mai^{6}	copular verb, to not be, is not, am not, are not; contraction of 唔係 "m^{4} hai6"	不是	-
咪	mai^{2}	negative imperative, no need to, don't; possibly a contraction of 唔使 "m^{4} sai2"	不要	-
喐	juk^{1}	v. to move	动	逳
唞	tau^{2}	v. to rest; (originally "敨")	休息	敨
嘥	saai^{1}	v. to waste	浪费	-
呃	ngak^{1}/ngaak^{1}	v. to deceive	骗	-
𠺘	long^{2}	v. to rinse, to gargle	漱	-
𠺘	long^{2}	v. to shake, to swing	摇	-
啜	zyut^{3}	v. to suck	吸	涰 歠 嚽
啜	zyut^{3}	v. to stick to (a surface), to get stuck on	附着	涰 歠 嚽
啜	zyut^{3-1}	v. to kiss	吻	涰 歠 嚽
嗌	aai^{3}/ngaai^{3}	v. to yell	喊	-
嗌	aai^{3}/ngaai^{3}	v. to order food	订购	-
噏	ap^{1}/ngap^{1}	v. to babble; used in compounds like "發噏瘋" ("to talk nonsense"), possible nasal-stop alternation of "吟"	说废话	-
𠺪	he^{3}	v. / adj. to kill time, to do something without putting much care or effort into it; slack, perfunctory	-	hea 呬
呻	san^{3}	v. to complain, to express discontent	抱怨	-
呻	sang^{3}	v. to blow one's nose; alternative form of "擤"	擤鼻涕	擤
𠼮	ngai^{1}	v. to nag and beg	-	囈 噅 𠱓
嚟	lei^{4}/lai^{4}	v. to come; vernacular pronunciation of "来"	来	-
嚟	lei^{4}/lai^{4}	particle, used to emphasise that the identity of the subject is the object, e.g. "呢隻係狗嚟嘅" ("This is a dog")	来	-
嚟	lei^{4}/lai^{4}	adv. to, for (a purpose)	来	-
唔	m^{4}	adv. not, no, cannot; indicates negation.	不	毋
啱	ngaam^{1}	adv. just, nearly	刚	-
啱	ngaam^{1}	adv. correct, suitable	对	-
咁	gam^{3}	adj. so; e.g. "做咩你咁黐線?" ("Why are you so out of your mind?")	这么	-
叻	lek^{1}	adj. smart	聪明	-
嘈	cou^{4}	adj. noisy; v. to annoy by making noise, to quarrel, to complain	吵	-
𠱃	nip^{1}	adj. dented, flat, crushed	瘪	-
嚤	mo^{1}	adj. slow	慢	-
嚡	haai^{4}	adj. (often referring to food) very rough, coarse	粗糙	-
嚡	haai^{4}	interjection. sigh	唉	-
嗱	naa^{4}	interjection. used when giving something to someone; equivalent to "Here!"	-	-
嗱	naa^{4}	interjection. used when calling someone's attention to something; equivalent to "Look!"	-	-
嗱	naa^{4}	interjection. used to remind someone of a warning; equivalent to "See!"	-	-
唓	ce^{1}	interjection. indicates skepticism; e.g. "唓！你話愛早起身，都係遲嘅啦” ("Oh, please! You said you want to wake up early, but you’ll definitely still be late")	-	-
唓	ce^{2}	interjection. indicates dismissal; e.g. "唓，好小事啫嘛" ("Pffft! It's just a trivial thing")	-	-
唓	ce^{2}	interjection. indicates realisation; e.g. "唓, 原來係噉容易做啫啊?" ("Oh, turns out this is way easier to do than I imagined!")	-	-
咦	ji^{2}	interjection. expresses disgust, similar to "ew!"	-	-
啋	coi^{1}	interjection. used to berate someone for saying something inauspicious, equivalent to English "touch wood"	-	-
喺	hai^{2}	prep. at, in, during (time), at, in (place)	在	-
嗰	go^{2}	demonstrative pronoun, that, those	那	-
嘢	je^{5}	n. / pron. thing, stuff	东西, 事物	-
喼	gip^{1}	n. suitcase; (originally "篋")	提箱	篋
噼	pet^{1}	n. (childish) buttocks	屁股	-
𡃁	leng^{1}	n. a follower, underling	-	僆
𡃁	leng^{1}	adj. young	-	僆
嚿	gau^{6}	classifier, for chunks of something	块	-
𠹻	zam^{6}	classifier, for smells	股	-
𠹌	lang^{1}	only used in the compound "半𠹌𠼰"; adj. (of a job) halfway done (usually used derogatorily)	一半	-
𠼰	kang^{1}	only used in the compound "半𠹌𠼰"; adj. (of a job) halfway done (usually used derogatorily)	一半	-
吽	ngau^{6}	only used in the compound "發吽哣"; v. to stare blankly	发呆	-
哣	dau^{6}	only used in the compound "發吽哣"; v. to stare blankly	发呆	-
咭	kaat^{1}	n. a card; from English "card"	卡	-
嘜	mak^{1}	n. mark, trademark; from English "mark"	马克	-
嘜	mak^{1}	n. a mug; from English "mug"	马克	-
呔	taai^{1}	n. a necktie; from English "tie"	領帶	-
呔	taai^{1}	n. a tyre; from English "tyre"	胎	-
𠽤	kik^{1}	n. a cake; from English "cake"	蛋糕	-
𠱸	seon^{2}	used in "咕𠱸" ("cushion"); from English "cushion"	软垫	-
𠹭	ko^{1}	v. to call someone on the phone; from English "call'	打电话	-
咇	bit^{1}	v. to squirt out of	-	-
咇	bit^{1}	n. beat, rhythm; from English "beat"	拍子	-
咇	bit^{1}	n. beat (a route patrolled by a police officer or a guard); from English "beat"	巡逻路线	-
咇	bit^{1}	onomatopoeia. sound of a beep	-	-
嗗	gut^{4}	onomatopoeia. sound of gulping; v. to gulp down	咕嘟	-

Other phono-semantic characters which are not formed with the "mouth" radical (口) include:

Character	Jyutping	Meaning	Standard Mandarin Chinese Equivalent	Alternative Characters
佢	keoi^{5}	pron. he / she / it	他, 她, 它	-
佬	lou^{2}	pron. guy, dude	男人	-
傢	gaa^{1}	only used in the compound "傢俬"; n. furniture; (originally "家私")	家具	家私
俬	si^{1}	only used in the compound "傢俬"; n. furniture; (originally "家私")	家具	家私
睇	tai^{2}	v. to see	看	-
瞓	fan^{3}	v. to sleep	睡	睏
䁪	zaam^{2}	v. to blink; nasal-stop alternation of "眨" (zaap^{3}) ("To blink; to wink")	眨	-
𥄫	gap^{6}	v. to stare, to peek	盯着; 偷看	-
睺	hau^{1}	v. to monitor, to watch closely	注意	-
睺	hau^{1}	v. to have desire for, to want	渴望	-
𥋇	caang^{3}	v. to open the eyes wide	睁大	-
𥋇	caang^{4}	adj. dazzling, blinding	刺眼	-
攞	lo^{2}	v. to take, to get, to hold	拿	-
拎	ling^{1}	v. to carry, to hold (usually for bags)	拿	-
搦	nik^{1}/lik^{1}	v. to hold (usually for lighter objects); nasal-stop alternation of "拎"	拿	-
揸	zaa^{1}	v. to grasp	握	-
揸	zaa^{1}	v. to drive	驾	-
揸	zaa^{1}	v. to squeeze	挤	-
擳	zit^{1}	v. to squeeze out	挤	瀄 㘉 唧 㵶
擳	zit^{1}	v. to tickle	挠痒	㘉
摒	beng^{3}	v. to hide	藏	偋 屏 庰 窉
搵	wan^{2}	v. to find	找	-
摷	caau^{3}	v. to rummage through with one's hands	翻找	-
摷	caau^{3}	v. to punch, to beat	殴打	-
揀	gaan^{2}	v. to pick	选	-
掹	mang^{1}	v. to pull	拉	擝
掂	dim^{3}	v. to touch	触碰	-
掂	dim^{6}	adj. straight, upright	直	𠶧
掂	dim^{6}	adj. good; for example "呢個人做嘢唔掂" ("This person is not really good at his work")	好	𠶧
𢴈	daat^{3}	v. to fall down, to throw down	跌	-
抰	joeng^{2}	v. to shake or wave something	摇, 挥	-
揈	fing^{6}	v. to swing, to fling	摔	捹
掝	fik^{6}	v. to swing, to wave; nasal-stop alternation of "揈"	摔	扐
掟	deng^{3}	v. to throw	扔	-
擗	pek^{6}	v. to throw away / to discard	丢	-
抌	dam^{2}	v. to throw down, to discard	丢	揼
抌	dam^{2}	v. to drop someone off	送下车	揼
抌	dam^{2}	v. to pound	捶打	揼
𢱕	dap^{6}	v. to pound; nasal-stop alternation of "抌"	捶打	-
扑	bok^{1}	v. to hit, to strike	打	㩧
搉	kok^{1}	v. to knock	敲	-
擁	ung^{2}	v. to push	推	㧬 𢫨
搲	waa^{2}/we^{2}	v. to scratch with one's hands	搔, 抓	攨
𢯎	ngaau^{1}	v. to scratch an itch	搔, 抓	-
𢯎	ngaau^{1}	v. to seek	找	-
𢯎	ngaau^{1}	v. to steal	偷	-
摳	kau^{1}	v. to mix	混	-
捽	zeot^{1}	v. to rub	擦	𢪄 𢬪 𢫆
揩	haai^{1}	v. to brush against; e.g. "嗰架的士揩到我架車" ("That taxi brushed against my car")	碰到而擦到	-
揦	laa^{2}	v. to grab	抓	𢲡
揦	laa^{2}	v. / adj. to irritate, irritating	刺激	-
搣	mit^{1}	v. to tear, to peel	撕, 削	-
搣	mit^{1}	v. to pinch with one's fingers	捏	-
撳	gam^{6}	v. to press	按	㩒 搇
扱	kap^{1}	v. to cover; to imprint	盖	𢲩
揗	tan^{4}	v. to shiver; used in compounds such as "揗雞" and "揗揗震"	颤抖	-
揗	tan^{4}	v. to wander; to move to and fro	来回来去	-
𢳂	bat^{1}	v. to scoop	舀	𢴩
掗	ngaa^{6}	v. to occupy	占	-
𢭃	dau^{6}	v. to ask for	索要	-
𢭃	dau^{6}	v. to receive	收到	-
𢭃	dau^{6}	v. to hold up	抬起	-
𢭃	dau^{3}	v. to touch	触摸	-
撠	kik^{1}	v. to stumble, to trip over	绊倒	-
撠	kik^{1}	v. to get stuck, to encounter difficulties	卡住	-
掅	cing^{3}	v. to lift up, to raise up	抬起	-
摵	cik^{1}	v. to lift up, to raise up; nasal-stop alternation of "掅"	抬起	-
掯	kang^{3}	adj. (of liquor or tobacco) strong; sharp	-	劥
𢲈	kek^{1}/kik^{1}	v. to tie a knot	打结	-
𢲈	kek^{1}/kik^{1}	adj. clumsy, hampered movement	-	-
拗	aau^{2}	v. to bend, to twist as to break	折弯	-
抦	bing^{2}	v. to beat up	殴打	-
撩	liu^{1}	v. to pick at, for example the nose	挖	-
𨂽	dam^{6}	v. to stomp one's foot; used in compounds such as "𨂽腳"	跺	-
𨃩	sin^{3}	v. / adj. to slip, slippery	滑倒, 滑	跣
踎	mau^{1}	v. to squat	蹲	-
踎	mau^{1}	v. to get stuck (in jail)	被困在(监牢里)	-
䟴	ngan^{3}	used in compounds like "䟴腳"; v. to bounce or vibrate one's leg (as when restless); believed to be a nasal-stop alternation of "趷"	抖腿	-
趷	gat^{6}	v. to walk with a limp	跛行	-
趷	gat^{6}	v. to lift or raise a part of the body	抬起	-
𨅝	caang^{3}/jaang^{3}	v. to press down or out with one's legs; to stretch one's legs; to tread on or to kick	-	-
𨅝	caang^{3}/jaang^{3}	v. to leave, to flee	逃	-
躝	laan^{1}	v. to crawl	爬	𨈆
躝	laan^{1}	v. (colloquial) to scram	-	𨈆
𨈇	naam^{3}/laam^{3}	v. to step over, to step across	跨过	𨂾 𨅏
屙	o^{1}	v. to pass urine or faeces	-	痾 疴 㢐 𡱻
屙	o^{1}	v. to have diarrhea	拉肚子	痾 疴 㢐 𡱻
瀨	laai^{6}	v. to pass urine or faeces involuntarily	-	-
滮	biu^{1}/piu^{4}	v. to ooze, to spurt out, to emerge suddenly	-	-
淝	fe^{4}	v. to spray	喷	-
𦧲	loe^{1}	v. to spit	吐	𠼱
詏	aau^{3}/ngaau^{3}	v. to argue, to dispute	争论	-
諗	nam^{2}/lam^{2}	v. to think	思考	惗 恁
腍	nam^{4}/lam^{4}	adj. soft	软	焾
黐	ci^{1}	v. / adj. to stick, sticky	黏	-
𣲷	nap^{6}/lap^{6}	adj. sticky, wet; usually used in compounds such as "黐𣲷"; nasal-stop alternation of "腍"	黏	𥹉 湆
淥	luk^{6}	v. to scald	烫, 烫伤	𤊒 熝
靚	leng^{3}	adj. pretty / handsome, nice	漂亮	-
癲	din^{1}	adj. insane	疯	-
焗	guk^{6}	adj. hot, stuffy	闷热	焅
焗	guk^{6}	v. to bake	烤	焅
焗	guk^{6}	v. to soak tea leaves in water thoroughly	泡	焅
焗	guk^{6}	v. to force into doing something	逼	焅
焫	naat^{3}/laat^{3}	v. to scald, to sear	烫伤	㶧 𤊶
煠	saap^{6}	v. to boil	-	烚 熠
孭	me^{1}	v. to carry on the back	背负	𧴯
脷	lei^{6}	n. tongue	舌	唎
㬹	zaang^{1}	n. the rear part of a limb, namely the elbow or the heel	手肘; 脚跟	踭
晏	aan^{3}/ngaan^{3}	n. / adv. late in the day, later	-	-
埞	deng^{6}	n. a place	地方	-
坺	pet^{3}	classifier, for soft masses, e.g. dirt, faeces	坨	噼
樖	po^{1}	classifier, for plants	棵, 朵	棵
樽	zeon^{1}	n. a bottle	瓶	墫 罇 𫑼 𤮐 𬲝
樽	zeon^{1}	classifier, for bottles of liquid	瓶	墫 罇 𫑼 𤮐 𬲝
癐	gui^{6}	adj. tired	累	攰
癦	mak^{6}	n. a mole (pigmented spot on the skin)	痣	墨 𦢓
鈪	ngaak^{2}	n. a bracelet (can more specifically mean a bangle)	手镯	-
鉎	seng^{3}	n. rust	锈	鍟
鎅	gaai^{3}	v. to cut using a blade or other sharp edges	-	𠝹 刉
舖	pou^{3}	n. a store; (originally "鋪")	店	鋪
裇	seot^{1}	n. a shirt; from English "shirt"	恤	-
𨋢	lip^{1}	n. a lift, an elevator; from English "lift"	电梯	-
𨋍	wen^{1}	n. a van; from English "van"	厢式货车	-
軚	taai^{5}	n. a steering wheel; (originally "舵")	方向盘	-
轆	luk^{1}	n. a wheel	轮	-
轆	luk^{1}	v. to roll	滚	碌
窿	lung^{1}	n. a hole; also used in words such as 窿窿罅(laa^{3})罅 "nook and cranny"	洞	-
冧	lam^{1}	n. a flower bud	蕾	-
冧	lam^{1}	v. to coax	哄	-
冧	lam^{3}	v. to topple over	倒	-
冚	kam^{2}	v. to cover up	盖	𢫏 搇
冚	kam^{2}	v. to slap someone in the face	批	𢫏 搇
冚	ham^{6}	adj. all, entire	全	咸
冚	ham^{6}	adj. (of openings) tight, firm	紧	咸
沊	dam^{2}	onomatopoeia. sound of an object dropping into water	-	-
斟	zam^{3}	v. to pour a drink into drinkware	倒	-
乸	naa^{2}	n. female	母的	-
乸	naa^{2}	n. mother	妈妈	-
乸	naa^{2}	adj. sissy, unmanly	娘娘腔	-
𢆡	nin^{1}/lin^{1}	n. breast	乳房	姩 脌 奶
髀	bei^{2}	n. thigh	腿	-
戙	dung^{6}	v. to erect; to stand	豎立	棟
戙	dung^{6}	classifier, for objects organized in vertical columns	列	棟
戙	dung^{6}	classifier, to bridges	座	棟
𤷪𤺧	mang^{2} zang^{2}	adj. irritated	烦躁	忟憎 𢛴憎 䒐䒏 憫憎 懞掙 蠻倀 䁅𤿆
㪐㩿	lak^{1} kak^{1}	v. to stutter	结巴	𬧊揢

=== Non Phono-semantic Compounds ===
Characters which are not phono-semantic compounds include:

Character	Jyutping	Meaning	Standard Mandarin Chinese Equivalent	Type of Character	Alternative Characters
冇	mou^{5}	v. to not have; vernacular pronunciation of "無"	没有	Indicative, formed by removing the two strokes inside of “有"; "有" means "to have"	無
乜	mat^{1}	pron. what (originally "物")	什么	Uncertain, from the cursive (草书) form of "物"?	物
畀	bei^{2}	v. to give	给	Pictograph of an arrow with a flat arrowhead, original character of "錍" ("OC *pʰeː, *pe"), later phonetically borrowed to represent the word "OC *pi[T]-s" ("to give")	俾
畀	bei^{2}	prep. by; e.g. "我畀蚊咬" ("I got bitten by a mosquito")	被	Pictograph of an arrow with a flat arrowhead, original character of "錍" ("OC *pʰeː, *pe"), later phonetically borrowed to represent the word "OC *pi[T]-s" ("to give")	俾
氹	tam^{4}	n. puddle, pit, trap; related to "窞" (daam^{6})	坑	Uncertain	凼
氹	tam^{4}	used in "氹氹轉"; v. to spin, to go round and round	旋转, 转圈圈	Uncertain	-
氹	tam^{4}	v. to coax; to comfort a child	哄	Uncertain	𧨾 𠱁
孖	maa^{1}	n. twins	双胞胎	Duplication (叠字) of 子 ("child")	-
孻	laai^{1}	used in "孻仔"; n. the youngest child; also used in "孻尾" and "孻面"; prep. / adv. / n. behind	后面	Compound ideograph; 子 (“child”) + 盡 (“end; finish”). "孻" originally meant "the youngest son of an old parent", i.e. "the last son"	-
閂	saan^{1}	v. to close	关	Compound ideograph; 門 ("door") + 一 ("crossbar"); a crossbar over a gate, sealing it closed	𣟴 𣠯
奀	ngan^{1}	adj. skinny, thin; meagre	瘦削; 微薄	Compound ideograph; 不 ("not") + 大 ("big")	-
曱甴	gaat^{6} zaat^{2}	n. cockroach; related to Hokkien 虼蚻 "ka-choa̍h"	蟑螂	Uncertain, perhaps a modification of the character "甲" (gaap^{3})?	-

The words represented by these characters are also sometimes cognates with pre-existing Mandarin Chinese words. However, their colloquial Cantonese pronunciations have diverged from formal Cantonese pronunciations. For example, 無 ("without") is normally pronounced mou^{4} in literature. In spoken Cantonese, 冇 mou^{5} has the same usage, meaning, and pronunciation as 無, except for tone. 冇 represents the spoken Cantonese form of the word "without", while 無 represents the word used in Classical Chinese and Mandarin. However, 無 is still used in some instances in spoken Cantonese, such as 無論如何 ("no matter what happens"). Another example is the doublet 來/嚟, which means "come". 來 loi^{4} is used in literature; 嚟 lei^{4} is the spoken Cantonese form.

=== Workarounds ===
Although most Cantonese words can be found in the current encoding system, input workarounds are commonly used both by those unfamiliar with them, and by those whose input methods do not allow for easy input (similar to how some Russian speakers might write in the Latin script if their computing device lacks the ability to input Cyrillic). Some Cantonese writers use simple romanization (e.g. using "la" to represent "喇"), symbols (e.g. adding a Latin letter "o" in front of "係" to represent "喺"; using "D" to represent "啲"), homophones (e.g. using "果" to represent "嗰"), or a character that is similar in form and pronunciation (e.g. using "野" to represent "嘢") in place of certain characters. For example,

Sentence	你	喺	嗰度	好	喇,	千	祈	唔	好	搞	佢	啲	嘢。
Substitutions	你	o係	果度	好	la,	千	祈	唔	好	搞	佢	D	野。
Jyutping	nei5	hai2	go2 dou6	hou2	laa3	cin1	kei4	m4	hou2	gaau2	keoi5	di1	je5
Gloss	you	being	there	good	FP	thousand	pray	not	good	mess with	he/she	bit	things/stuff
Translation	"You'd better stay there, and under no circumstances mess with his/her stuff."												

== Profanities ==
See Cantonese profanity.

== See also ==
- Cantonese braille
- Hong Kong Sign Language
- Written Hokkien
- Saam kap dai
- 粵語本字表
