= Nanyin =

Nanyin may refer to:

- Empress Yang Zhi, nickname
- Nanguan music, a style of traditional Chinese music originally from Fujian
- Naamyam, a style of traditional Cantonese music
- Nanyin, Hebei, a town in Yuanshi County, Hebei, China

== See also ==
- Nanying (disambiguation)
