= Nanying =

Nanying may refer to:

- Nanying, Gaocheng District, a town in Gaocheng District, Shijiazhuang, Hebei, China
- Nanying Township, a township in Lingshou County, Shijiazhuang, Hebei, China
- Nanying Subdistrict (南营街道), a subdistrict of Yicheng, Hubei, China

== See also ==
- Nanyin (disambiguation)
