= Nanmeng =

Nanmeng (南孟镇) may refer to the following towns in Hebei province, China:

- Nanmeng, Shijiazhuang, subdivision of Gaocheng District
- Nanmeng, Bazhou, Hebei (zh), subdivision of Bazhou, Hebei
