= Gangshang =

Gangshang may refer to the following locations in China:

- Gangshang, Hebei (岗上镇), town in Gaocheng
- Gangshang, Jiangxi (冈上镇), town in Nanchang County
- Gangshang, Shandong (港上镇), town in Tancheng County
