= Saam kap dai =

Chinese writing style

- Chinese: 三及第
- Yale Romanization: sāam kahp daih
- Jyutping: saam^{1} kap^{6} dai^{6(*2)}
- IPA: [sam˥ kʰɐp̚˨ tɐj˨]/[tɐj˧˥]

Saam kap dai (Chinese: 三及第; IPA: [sam˥ kʰɐp̚˨ tɐj˨]/[tɐj˧˥]) was a writing style combining Classical Chinese, Written Cantonese and Standard Chinese. The articles and stories written in saam kap dai first appeared in several Guangzhou newspapers in the 1940s and 1950s, eventually popularized by its widespread use in Hong Kong newspapers from the late 1940s to the 1960s.

Saam kap dai is notable in how it uses the different systems to help reflect different registers in writing. Sentences with more Classical Chinese vocabulary and grammar give off the impression of more formality and authority, while those in Standard Chinese have a far more neutral and straightforward feel to them, and written Cantonese being far more informal and colloquial, often incorporating a lot of slang.

== Name ==
Two main theories exist for the name. One is from the name for the three ranks awarded by the imperial examination of dynastic China, in Chinese: 三元及第; Jyutping: saam1 jyun4 kap6 dai6. The other is that it is derived from the name of a congee dish popular in Guangdong, called in Chinese: 三及第肉; Jyutping: saam1 kap6 dai6 juk6. The two are linked, as this porridge is eaten by children in the hope that candidates will score highly in such examinations.

== History ==
In the early 1900s, tabloid newspapers of the mosquito press (Chinese: 小報; pinyin: xiǎobào; Jyutping: siu2 bou3) in Hong Kong and Guangzhou used a base of written Standard Chinese and Classical Chinese, with very occasional examples of Written Cantonese. For example, in the 1920s and 1930s, runs of the newspapers Guzi (Chinese: 骨子) and The China Star (Chinese: 華星) only contained a maximum 20 examples of Written Cantonese per issue.

After the Second World War, many such newspapers adopted the saam kap dai style. An analysis of one issue of Hung Lok (Chinese: 紅綠) from 1947 shows several features of the style:

- A base of formal Standard Chinese.
  - Using 的 (Jyutping: dik1, Pinyin: de) instead of the native Cantonese 嘅 (Jyutping: ge3) as the possessive marker and relativizer.
- Just over 10% of the text employs Written Cantonese characters, less than half the percentage for dialect literature movement texts from the same period.
  - Most of these are Cantonese function words.
- Features of Classical Chinese syntax, such as:
  - Using 之 (Jyutping: zi1) to mean 'him', whereas 他 would be used in Standard Chinese and 佢 in Written Cantonese.
  - Using 曰 (Jyutping: jyut6) to introduce direct speech, in contrast to Standard Chinese 說 or Written Cantonese 話.

The majority genre using saam kap dai is serial fiction, many of which involve war stories and crime fiction set in Hong Kong and Guangdong. There are also traditional moral fables, and advice columns using this form of writing. In 1940s newspapers such as Hung Lok, the number of articles using such a style reached a peak, with a local Hong Kong working-class readership as their clear target audience.

By 1950, the serial fiction genre was no longer confined to mosquito press newspapers in Hong Kong, with serials being run in newspapers such as the New Life Evening News (Chinese: 新生晚報; pinyin: Xīnshēng Wǎnbào; Jyutping: San1 Sang1 Maan5 Bou3), appealing to a more white-collar audience. The use of first-person narrative allowed a greater percentage of Written Cantonese in the stories. This genre continued to be popular into the 1960s and 1970s, although the Classical Chinese element tended to dwindle with time.

Another genre which frequently employed the saam kap dai style was the 'odd opinion' piece (Chinese: 怪論; Jyutping: gwaai3 leon6), particularly associated with the columnist Saam So. Many authors have felt that the heterogeneity of the language employed allows a greater range of linguistic tools, and this is reflected in the fact the use of saam kap dai in this genre is still current in the early 21st century.

Despite this, the use of saam kap dai in the 21st century is generally considered moribund, having from the 1980s yielded its place to texts in a form of Written Cantonese closer to the spoken idiom.

According to one modern analysis, a "new" saam kap dai has emerged since the 1970s, combining elements of the English language with Written Cantonese and Standard Chinese.
