= Hinggan =

Hinggan is the Manchu form of Khingan, the Mongolian name of a series of mountain ranges. It now most often refers to:

- Hinggan League, an administrative division of Inner Mongolia, China
- Da Hinggan Ling Prefecture, prefecture of Heilongjiang, China

In Manchu contexts, it may also refer to:

- Khingan (disambiguation), from the Mongolian form of the same name
- Xing'an (disambiguation), from the Chinese form of the same name
