= Khingan =

Khingan (Mongolian: Хянган; Russian: Хинган) is the Mongolian name for the mountains divided into the:

- Greater Khingan, volcanic mountain range in Inner Mongolia, China
- Lesser Khingan, mountain range in the northeastern section of Heilongjiang, China
- Outer Khingan, also known as the Stanovoy Range; mountain range located in southeastern parts of the Russian Far East

In Mongolian contexts, it may also refer to:

- Hinggan (disambiguation), from the Manchu form of the same name
- Xing'an (disambiguation), from the Chinese form of the same name
