= Zhangjiazhuang =

Coordinates: 38°10′31″N 114°44′22″E

Zhangjiazhuang 张家庄镇
- Town

Chinese transcription(s)
- Interactive map of Zhangjiazhuang
- Country: China
- Province: Hebei
- Prefecture: Shijiazhuang
- District: Gaocheng
- Time zone: UTC+8 (China Standard Time)

Zhangjiazhuang (Chinese: 张家庄镇) is a township-level division of Gaocheng, Shijiazhuang, Hebei, China.

== See also ==
- List of township-level divisions of Hebei
