= Chang'an Town, Shijiazhuang =

Chang'an 常安镇
- Town
- Location in Hebei
- Coordinates: 37°56′16″N 114°56′52″E
- Country: People's Republic of China
- Province: Hebei
- Prefecture-level city: Shijiazhuang
- County-level city: Gaocheng
- Village-level divisions: 18 villages
- Elevation: 48 m (157 ft)
- Time zone: UTC+8 (China Standard)
- Area code: 0311

Chang'an (Chinese: 常安; pinyin: Cháng'ān) is a town under the administration of Gaocheng City in southwestern Hebei province, China, located 13 kilometres (8.1 mi) southeast of downtown Gaocheng. As of 2011, it has 18 villages under its administration.

== See also ==
- List of township-level divisions of Hebei
