= Xiguan, Hebei =

Xiguan, Gaocheng 西关镇
- Town

Chinese transcription(s)
- Interactive map of Xiguan, Gaocheng
- Country: China
- Province: Hebei
- Prefecture: Shijiazhuang
- District: Gaocheng
- Time zone: UTC+8 (China Standard Time)

Xiguan, Gaocheng (Chinese: 西关镇) is a township-level division of Gaocheng, Shijiazhuang, Hebei, China.

== See also ==
- List of township-level divisions of Hebei
