= Qiutou =

Qiutou 丘头镇
- Town

Chinese transcription(s)
- Interactive map of Qiutou
- Coordinates: 37.98406°N 114.6909°E
- Country: China
- Province: Hebei
- Prefecture: Shijiazhuang
- District: Gaocheng
- Time zone: UTC+8 (China Standard Time)

Qiutou (Chinese: 丘头镇) is a township-level division of Gaocheng, Shijiazhuang, Hebei, China.

== See also ==
- List of township-level divisions of Hebei
