= Zengcun =

Coordinates: 38°14′46″N 114°44′22″E

Zengcun 增村镇
- Town

Chinese transcription(s)
- Interactive map of Zengcun
- Country: China
- Province: Hebei
- Prefecture: Shijiazhuang
- District: Gaocheng
- Time zone: UTC+8 (China Standard Time)

Zengcun (Chinese: 增村镇) is a township-level division of Gaocheng, Shijiazhuang, Hebei, China. The Shijiazhuang Zhengding International Airport is located next to the town.

== See also ==
- List of township-level divisions of Hebei
