= Nandong =

Coordinates: 38.10237°N 114.76584°E

Nandong 南董镇
- Town

Chinese transcription(s)
- Interactive map of Nandong
- Country: China
- Province: Hebei
- Prefecture: Shijiazhuang
- District: Gaocheng
- Time zone: UTC+8 (China Standard Time)

Nandong (Chinese: 南董镇) is a township-level division of Gaocheng, Shijiazhuang, Hebei, China.

== See also ==
- List of township-level divisions of Hebei
