= Jiashizhuang =

Jiashizhuang 贾市庄镇
- Town
- Location in Hebei
- Coordinates: 37°52′06″N 114°56′52″E
- Country: People's Republic of China
- Province: Hebei
- Prefecture-level city: Shijiazhuang
- County-level city: Gaocheng
- Village-level divisions: 10 villages
- Elevation: 44 m (144 ft)
- Time zone: UTC+8 (China Standard)
- Area code: 0311

Jiashizhuang (simplified Chinese: 贾市庄; traditional Chinese: 賈市莊; pinyin: Jiǎshìzhuāng) is a town under the administration of Gaocheng in southwestern Hebei province, China, located 19 kilometres (12 mi) southeast of downtown Gaocheng. As of 2011, it has 10 villages under its administration.

== See also ==
- List of township-level divisions of Hebei
