= Cantonese phonology =

Phonology of the Cantonese language

Standard Cantonese pronunciation originates from Guangzhou (also known as Canton) the capital of Guangdong Province. Hong Kong Cantonese is closely related to the Guangzhou dialect, with only minor differences. Yue dialects spoken in other parts of Guangdong and Guangxi provinces, such as Taishanese, exhibit more significant differences in pronunciation.

== Syllables ==
Cantonese uses about 1,760 syllables to cover pronunciation of more than 10,000 Chinese characters. Most syllables are represented by standard Chinese characters, however a few are written with colloquial Cantonese characters. Cantonese has a relatively simple syllable structure when compared to other languages. A Cantonese syllable contains one tone-carrying vowel with up to one consonant on either side. The average Cantonese syllable represents 6 unique Chinese characters.

== Sounds ==
A Cantonese syllable usually includes an initial (onset) and a final (rime/rhyme). The Cantonese syllabary numbers about 630.

Some syllables—such as /kʷeŋ˥/ (扃), /ɛː˨/ and /ei˨/ (欸)—are no longer common. Some—such as /kʷek˥/ and /kʷʰek˥/ (隙), or /kʷaːŋ˧˥/ and /kɐŋ˧˥/ (梗)—have traditionally had two equally correct pronunciations, but speakers are starting to pronounce them in only one particular way. This usually occurs because the 'unused' pronunciation is almost unique to that word alone, which leads to the unused sounds practically disappearing from the language.

Some syllables—such as /kʷʰɔːk˧/ (擴), /pʰuːi˥/ (胚), /tsɵi˥/ (錐), /kaː˥/ (痂)—have alternative nonstandard pronunciations that have become mainstream (as /kʷʰɔːŋ˧/, /puːi˥/, /jɵi˥/ and /kʰɛː˥/, respectively). However, others—such as /faːk˧/ (謋), /fɐŋ˩/ (揈), /tɐp˥/ (耷)—have become popularly (but erroneously) believed to be made-up or borrowed from modern vernacular Cantonese when they have in fact been present since before these vernacular usages became popular.

In Hong Kong, there are new words (neologisms) that use combinations borrowed from other languages. For example, /kɛt˥/, a syllable which was borrowed from the English word get, means "to understand". This /ɛt/ final sound does not fit into general Cantonese phonology, though the final sound with the longer vowel -et /ɛːt/ has appeared in vernacular Cantonese before: e.g. pet6 /pʰɛːt˨/ 坺, the measure word for gooey or sticky substances such as mud or glue.

=== Initial consonants ===
Initials (or onsets) refer to the 19 initial consonants which may occur at the beginning of a syllable. Some syllables have no initials and are said to have a null initial. The following is the inventory for Cantonese as represented by the IPA:

| | | Labial | Coronal | | Palatal | Velar | | Glottal |
| | | Labial | plain | sibilant | Palatal | plain | labial | Glottal |
|---|---|---|---|---|---|---|---|---|
| Nasal | | m 明 | (n) 泥 | | | (ŋ) 我 | | |
| Plosive/ Affricate | tenuis | p 幫 | t 端 | t͡s 精 | (t͡sʲ) | k 見 | kʷ 瓜 | (ʔ) 亞 |
| Plosive/ Affricate | aspirated | pʰ 滂 | tʰ 透 | t͡sʰ 清 | (t͡sʲʰ) | kʰ 溪 | kʷʰ 困 | |
| Fricative | | f 非 | | s 心 | (sʲ) | | | h 曉 |
| Approximant | | | l 來 | | j 以 | | w 云 | |

- In casual speech, many native speakers do not distinguish between /n l/, nor between /ŋ/ and the null initial. Usually they pronounce only /l/ and the null initial. See the discussion on phonological shift below.
- Some linguists prefer to analyze /j w/ as part of finals to make them analogous to the /i u/ medials in Mandarin, especially in comparative phonological studies. However, since final-heads only appear with null initial or /k kʰ/, analyzing them as part of the initials greatly reduces the count of finals at the cost of adding only four initials.
- Some linguists analyze a /ʔ/ (glottal stop) in place of the null initial when a vowel begins a syllable.
- The coronals vary from dental to alveolar, with /t tʰ/ more likely to be dental.
  - /t͡s t͡sʰ s/ are alveolar, and articulatory findings indicate they are palatalized before /iː yː/.
  - /t͡s t͡sʰ/ also have a tendency to be palatalized before /œː ɵ/.
  - Historically, another alveolo-palatal sibilant series existed as discussed below.

=== Vowels and finals ===
Chart of monophthongs used in Cantonese

Chart of diphthongs used in Cantonese

Finals (or rimes/rhymes) are the part of the sound after the initial. A final is typically composed of a main vowel (nucleus) and a terminal (coda).

==== Eleven-vowel analysis ====
As the traditionally transcribed near-close finals ([ɪŋ], [ɪk], [ʊŋ], [ʊk]) have been found to be pronounced in the mid region, according to acoustic research, sources such as Bauer & Benedict (1997:46–47) prefer to analyze them as close-mid ([eŋ], [ek], [oŋ], [ok]) which results in eleven vowel phonemes. In this analysis, vowel length is a key contrastive feature of the vowels.

| | Front | | | | Central | | Back | |
| | unrounded | | rounded | | Central | | Back | |
| | short | long | short | long | short | long | short | long |
|---|---|---|---|---|---|---|---|---|
| Close | | iː | | yː | | | | uː |
| Mid | e | ɛː | ɵ | œː | | | o | ɔː |
| Open | | | | | ɐ | aː | | |

The following chart lists all the finals in Cantonese as represented in IPA.

| | | Main Vowel | | | | | | | | | | | Syllabic Consonant |
| | | /aː/ | /ɐ/ | /ɛː/ | /e/ | /œː/ | /ɵ/ | /ɔː/ | /o/ | /iː/ | /yː/ | /uː/ | Syllabic Consonant |
|---|---|---|---|---|---|---|---|---|---|---|---|---|---|
| Monophthong | | aː 沙 | | ɛː 些 | | œː 鋸 | | ɔː 疏 | | iː 詩 | yː 書 | uː 夫 | |
| Diphthong | /i/ [i, y] | aːi 街 | ɐi 雞 | | ei 你 | | ɵy 水 | ɔːy 愛 | | | | uːy 會 | |
| Diphthong | /u/ | aːu 教 | ɐu 夠 | ɛːu 掉^{[note]} | | | | | ou 好 | iːu 了 | | | |
| Nasal | /m/ | aːm 衫 | ɐm 深 | ɛːm 舐^{[note]} | | | | | | iːm 點 | | | m̩ 唔 |
| Nasal | /n/ | aːn 山 | ɐn 新 | ɛːn 𨋍^{[note]} | | | ɵn 準 | ɔːn 看 | | iːn 見 | yːn 遠 | uːn 歡 | |
| Nasal | /ŋ/ | aːŋ 橫 | ɐŋ 宏 | ɛːŋ 鏡 | eŋ 敬 | œːŋ 傷 | | ɔːŋ 方 | oŋ 風 | | | | ŋ̍ 五 |
| Checked | /p/ | aːp 插 | ɐp 輯 | ɛːp 夾^{[note]} | | | | | | iːp 接 | | | |
| Checked | /t/ | aːt 達 | ɐt 突 | ɛːt 噼^{[note]} | | | ɵt 出 | ɔːt 渴 | | iːt 結 | yːt 血 | uːt 沒 | |
| Checked | /k/ | aːk 百 | ɐk 北 | ɛːk 錫 | ek 亦 | œːk 著 | | ɔːk 國 | ok 六 | | | | |

==== Eight-vowel analysis ====
Some sources prefer to keep the near-close finals ([ɪŋ], [ɪk], [ʊŋ], [ʊk]) as traditionally transcribed and to analyze the long-short pairs [ɛː, e], [ɔː, o], [œː, ɵ], [iː, ɪ] and [uː, ʊ] as allophones of the same phonemes, resulting in an eight-vowel system, instead. In this analysis, vowel length is mainly allophonic and is contrastive only in the open vowels. The long-short contrast can also be described as a tense-lax contrast, as the distinction is not only a matter of vowel length but also of vowel quality. The charts shown in this article for each of these two analyses both display the same number of finals (56 plus two syllabic nasals).

| | Front | | Central | | Back |
| | Unrounded | Rounded | Short | Long | Back |
|---|---|---|---|---|---|
| Close | /i/ [iː, ɪ] | /y/ [yː] | | | /u/ [uː, ʊ] |
| Mid | /e/ [ɛː, e] | /ø/ [œː, ɵ] | | | /o/ [ɔː, o] |
| Open | | | /ɐ/ | /aː/ | |

The following chart lists all the finals in Cantonese as represented in IPA.

| | | Main Vowel | | | | | | | | Syllabic Consonant |
| | | /aː/ | /ɐ/ | /e/ [ɛː, e] | /ø/ [œː, ɵ] | /o/ [ɔː, o] | /i/ [iː, ɪ] | /y/ [yː] | /u/ [uː, ʊ] | Syllabic Consonant |
|---|---|---|---|---|---|---|---|---|---|---|
| Monophthong | | aː 沙 | | ɛː 些 | œː 鋸 | ɔː 疏 | iː 詩 | yː 書 | uː 夫 | |
| Diphthong | /i/ [i, y] | aːi 街 | ɐi 雞 | ei 你 | ɵy 水 | ɔːy 愛 | | | uːy 會 | |
| Diphthong | /u/ | aːu 教 | ɐu 夠 | ɛːu 掉^{[note]} | | ou 好 | iːu 了 | | | |
| Nasal | /m/ | aːm 衫 | ɐm 深 | ɛːm 舐^{[note]} | | | iːm 點 | | | m̩ 唔 |
| Nasal | /n/ | aːn 山 | ɐn 新 | ɛːn 𨋍^{[note]} | ɵn 準 | ɔːn 看 | iːn 見 | yːn 遠 | uːn 歡 | |
| Nasal | /ŋ/ | aːŋ 橫 | ɐŋ 宏 | ɛːŋ 鏡 | œːŋ 傷 | ɔːŋ 方 | ɪŋ 敬 | | ʊŋ 風 | ŋ̍ 五 |
| Checked | /p/ | aːp 插 | ɐp 輯 | ɛːp 夾^{[note]} | | | iːp 接 | | | |
| Checked | /t/ | aːt 達 | ɐt 突 | ɛːt 噼^{[note]} | ɵt 出 | ɔːt 渴 | iːt 結 | yːt 血 | uːt 沒 | |
| Checked | /k/ | aːk 百 | ɐk 北 | ɛːk 錫 | œːk 著 | ɔːk 國 | ɪk 亦 | | ʊk 六 | |

==== Complementary distribution of [yː] and [uː] ====
A further reduction of vowel phonemes observes that [yː] and [uː] occur in complementary distribution, with [uː] always occurring after initial labial (/m, p, pʰ, f/) or labialized (/kʷ, kʰʷ/) consonants and [yː] after all others, effectively combining the [y] and [u] vowels into a single /u/ phoneme. This necessitates words like 姑 to be analyzed as [kʷuː] instead of [kuː], which is possible as they (and similarly [kʰʷuː] and [kʰuː]) are not phonemically contrasted anyway.

==== Other notes ====
Note: ^{a} ^{b} ^{c} ^{d} ^{e} Finals /ɛːu/, /ɛːm/, /ɛːn/, /ɛːp/ and /ɛːt/ only appear in colloquial pronunciations of characters. They are absent from some analyses and romanization systems.

Diphthongal ending /i/ is rounded after rounded vowels. Nasal consonants can occur as base syllables in their own right and are known as syllabic nasals. The stop consonants (/p, t, k/) are unreleased ([p̚, t̚, k̚]).

When the three checked tones are separated, the stop codas /p, t, k/ are in complementary distribution with the nasal codas /m, n, ŋ/.

== Tones ==
Relative fundamental-frequency contours for six Cantonese tones with examples and Jyutping/Yale tone numbers (modified from Francis (2008))

Cantonese uses tone contours to distinguish words, with the number of possible tones depending on the type of final. While Guangzhou Cantonese generally distinguishes between high-falling and high-level tones, the two have merged in Hong Kong Cantonese and Macau Cantonese, yielding a system of six different tones in syllables ending in a semi-vowel or nasal consonant (some of these have more than one realization, but such differences are not used to distinguish words). In finals that end in a stop consonant, the number of tones is reduced to three; in Chinese descriptions, these "checked tones" are treated separately by diachronic convention, so that Cantonese is traditionally said to have nine tones. However, phonetically these are a conflation of tone and final consonant; the number of phonemic tones is six in Hong Kong and seven in Guangzhou.

| Coda type | Non-stop coda | | | | | | Stop coda | | |
|---|---|---|---|---|---|---|---|---|---|
| Tone name | dark flat (陰平) | dark rising (陰上) | dark departing (陰去) | light flat (陽平) | light rising (陽上) | light departing (陽去) | upper dark entering (上陰入) | lower dark entering (下陰入) | light entering (陽入) |
| Description | high level, high falling | medium rising | medium level | low falling, very low level | low rising | low level | high level | medium level | low level |
| Example | 詩, 思 | 史 | 試 | 時 | 市 | 是 | 識 | 錫 | 食 |
| Tone letter | siː˥, siː˥˧ | siː˧˥ | siː˧ | siː˨˩, siː˩ | siː˩˧ | siː˨ | sɪk̚˥ | sɛːk̚˧ | sɪk̚˨ |
| IPA diacritic | síː, sîː | sǐː | sīː | si̖ː, sı̏ː | si̗ː | sìː | sɪ́k̚ | sɛ̄ːk̚ | sɪ̀k̚ |
| Yale or Jyutping tone number | 1 | 2 | 3 | 4 | 5 | 6 | 7 (or 1) | 8 (or 3) | 9 (or 6) |
| Yale diacritic | sī, sì | sí | si | sìh | síh | sih | sīk | sek | sihk |

The first tone can be either high-level or high-falling, usually without affecting the meaning of the words being spoken. Most speakers are in general not consciously aware of when they use, and when to use, high-level and high-falling. Most Hong Kong speakers have merged the high-level and high-falling tones. In Guangzhou, the high-falling tone is disappearing as well, but is still prevalent in certain words, e.g. in traditional Yale Romanization with diacritics, sàam (high-falling) means the number three 三, whereas sāam (high-level) means shirt 衫.

The relative pitch of the tones varies with the speaker; consequently, descriptions vary from one source to another. The difference between high- and mid-level tones (1 and 3) is about twice that between mid- and low-level (3 and 6): 60 Hz to 30 Hz. Low-falling (4) starts at the same pitch as low-level (6), but then drops; as is common with falling tones, it is shorter than the three level tones. The two rising tones, (2) and (5), both start at the level of (6), but rise to the level of (1) and (3), respectively.

Tones 3, 4, 5 and 6 are dipping in the last syllable when in an interrogative sentence or an exclamatory sentence. 眞係? "really?" is pronounced [tsɐn˥ hɐi˨˥].

The numbers "394052786" when pronounced in Cantonese, will give the nine tones in order (Romanization (Yale) saam1, gau2, sei3, ling4, ng5, yi6, chat7, baat8, luk9), thus giving a mnemonic for remembering the nine tones.

=== Heritage ===
For purposes of meters in Chinese poetry, the first and fourth tones are "flat/level tones" (平聲), while the rest are "oblique tones" (仄聲). The four tones of Middle Chinese continue to stay distinguished in Cantonese. And like other Yue dialects, the four tones split into yin tones (陰) with a relatively higher pitch and yang tones (陽) with a relatively lower pitch, thereby preserving an analog to the voicing distinction of Middle Chinese in the manner shown in the chart below.

| Middle Chinese | | | Cantonese | | |
| Tone | Initial | Nucleus | Tone Name | Tone Contour | Tone Number |
|---|---|---|---|---|---|
| Level | voiceless | | dark level | ˥, ˥˧ | 1 |
| Level | voiced | | light level | ˨˩, ˩ | 4 |
| Rising | voiceless | | dark rising | ˧˥ | 2 |
| Rising | voiced | | light rising | ˩˧ | 5 |
| Departing | voiceless | | dark departing | ˧ | 3 |
| Departing | voiced | | light departing | ˨ | 6 |
| Entering | voiceless | Short | upper dark entering | ˥ | 7 (1) |
| Entering | voiceless | Long | lower dark entering | ˧ | 8 (3) |
| Entering | voiced | | light entering | ˨ | 9 (6) |

The distinction of voiced and voiceless consonants found in Middle Chinese was preserved by the distinction of tones in Cantonese. The difference in vowel length further caused the splitting of the dark-entering tone, making Cantonese (as well as other Yue Chinese branches) one of the few Chinese varieties to have further split a tone after the voicing-related splitting of the four tones of Middle Chinese.

Cantonese is special in the way that the vowel length can affect both the rhyme and the tone. Some linguists believe that the vowel length feature may have roots in Old Chinese.

=== Changed tones ===
Cantonese also has two changed tones, which add the diminutive-like meaning "that familiar example" to a standard word. For example, the word for "silver" (銀, /ŋɐn˩/) with a modified tone (/ŋɐn꜔꜒/) means "coin". They are comparable to the diminutive suffixes 兒 and 子 of Mandarin. In addition, modified tones are used in compounds, reduplications (擒擒青 /kɐm˩ kɐm˩ tʃʰɛːŋ˥/→/kɐm˩ kɐm꜔꜒ tʃʰɛːŋ˥/ "in a hurry") and direct address to family members (妹妹 /muːy˨ muːy˨/ →/muːy˨꜖ muːy꜔꜒/ "sister").

The two modified tones are high-level, like tone 1, and mid-rising, like tone 2, though for some people not as high as the canonical tone 2. The high-level changed tone is more common for speakers with a high-falling tone; for others, mid-rising (or its variant realization) is the main changed tone, in which case it only operates on those syllables with a non-high-level and non-mid rising tone (i.e. only tones 3, 4, 5 and 6 in Yale and Jyutping romanizations may have changed tones). However, in certain specific vocatives, the changed tone does indeed result in a high-level tone (tone 1), including speakers without a phonemically distinct high-falling tone.

== Historical change ==
Like other languages, Cantonese sounds are constantly changing, in a process where more and more native speakers of a language change the pronunciations of certain sounds.

One shift that affected Cantonese in the past was the merger of alveolar and alveolo-palatal (sometimes termed as postalveolar) sibilants, which occurred during the late 19th and early 20th centuries. Multiple Cantonese dictionaries and pronunciation guides published prior to the 1950s documented this distinction, which is no longer documented in any modern Cantonese dictionary.

Publications that documented this distinction include:

- Williams, S., A Tonic Dictionary of the Chinese Language in the Canton Dialect, 1856.
- Cowles, R., A Pocket Dictionary of Cantonese, 1914.
- Meyer, B. and Wempe, T., The Student's Cantonese-English Dictionary, 3rd edition, 1947.
- Chao, Y. Cantonese Primer, 1947.

This distinction was lost, causing a number of words that were once distinct to sound the same. For comparison, modern Standard Mandarin still has this distinction, with most Cantonese alveolo-palatal sibilants corresponding to Mandarin retroflex sibilants. For instance:

| Sibilant Category | Character | Modern Cantonese | Pre-1950s Cantonese | Standard Mandarin |
|---|---|---|---|---|
| Unaspirated affricate | 將 | /tsœːŋ/ (merged) | /tsœːŋ/ (alveolar) | /tɕiɑŋ/ (alveolo-palatal) |
| Unaspirated affricate | 張 | /tsœːŋ/ (merged) | /tɕœːŋ/ (alveolo-palatal) | /tʂɑŋ/ (retroflex) |
| Aspirated affricate | 槍 | /tsʰœːŋ/ (merged) | /tsʰœːŋ/ (alveolar) | /tɕʰiɑŋ/ (alveolo-palatal) |
| Aspirated affricate | 昌 | /tsʰœːŋ/ (merged) | /tɕʰœːŋ/ (alveolo-palatal) | /tʂʰɑŋ/ (retroflex) |
| Fricative | 相 | /sœːŋ/ (merged) | /sœːŋ/ (alveolar) | /ɕiɑŋ/ (alveolo-palatal) |
| Fricative | 傷 | /sœːŋ/ (merged) | /ɕœːŋ/ (alveolo-palatal) | /ʂɑŋ/ (retroflex) |

The merged phoneme shows might be pronounced with palatalisation, depending on the following vowel, as discussed above.

Even though the aforementioned references observed the phonemic distinction, most of them also noted that the merger was already occurring at the time. Williams (1856) writes:

The initials ch and ts are constantly confounded, and some persons are absolutely unable to detect the difference, more frequently identifying the words under ts as ch, than contrariwise.

Cowles (1914) adds:

"s" initial may be heard for "sh" initial and vice versa.

A vestige of this palatalization difference is sometimes reflected in the romanization scheme used for Cantonese names in Hong Kong. For instance, a number of names are spelled with sh even though the "sh sound" (/ɕ/) is no longer used to pronounce the word. Examples include the surname 石 (/sɛːk˨/), which is often romanized as Shek, and the names of places such as Sha Tin (沙田; /saː˥ tʰiːn˩/).

In Mandarin, alveolo-palatal sibilants occur in complementary distribution with retroflex sibilants, with alveolo-palatal sibilants only occurring before /i/ or /y/. However, Mandarin also retains the medials, where /i/ and /y/ can occur, as can be seen in the examples above. Cantonese had lost its medials some time ago, reducing the ability for speakers to distinguish its sibilant initials.

=== Ongoing changes ===
A number of modern-day younger Hong Kong speakers do not distinguish between phoneme pairs such as /n/ vs. /l/ and /ŋ/ vs. null initial and merge one sound into another. Examples of this include 你 /nei˨˧/ being pronounced as /lei˨˧/ and 我 /ŋɔː˨˧/ being pronounced as /ɔː˨˧/. Another incipient sound change is the lost distinctions in /kʷ/ vs. /k/ and /kʷʰ/ vs. /kʰ/, for example 國 /kʷɔːk˧/ being pronounced as [kɔːk̚˧]. Although that is often considered substandard and denounced as "lazy sounds/pronunciation" (懶音), it is becoming more common and is influencing other Cantonese-speaking regions (see Hong Kong Cantonese).

== See also ==
- Proper Cantonese pronunciation
- Cantonese nasal-stop alternation
