= Cantonese changed tones =

Element of Cantonese pronunciation

Cantonese changed tones (also called pinjam; traditional Chinese: 變音; simplified Chinese: 变音; pinyin: biànyīn; Jyutping: bin3jam1; Cantonese Yale: binyām), or occasionally referred to as morphological tone changes (traditional Chinese: 形態素變調; simplified Chinese: 形态素变调; pinyin: biànyīn; Jyutping: jing4 taai3 sou3 bin3 diu6; Cantonese Yale: yìhng taai sou bin diuh), occur when a character's tone becomes a different tone due to a particular context or meaning. A "changed" tone is the tone of the word when it is read in a particular lexical or grammatical context, while the base (or underlying) tone is usually the tone of the word when read in citation. It is thus distinct from tone sandhi, which are automatic modifications of tone created by their phonetic environment, without regard to meaning. In its most common form, it occurs primarily on nouns and verbs, and on the final syllable of either a compound word, a reduplicated word, along with certain nouns of address, especially in direct address to people such as family members. There are a limited set of semantic domains where changed tone occurs, generally associated with small things, familiarity, food and disease.

In the Jyutping Romanisation of a character with a changed tone, the first superscript number indicates the original tone, and the second indicates the changed tone. For example in "waan^{4-2}", the "^{4}" indicates the character is originally pronounced with the 4th tone, and the "^{2}" indicates the character's tone has shifted to the 2nd tone, and should be read as such.

A changed tone in Standard Cantonese manifests as one of two forms, either as a high level tone (i.e. tone 1 in Jyutping and Yale) or as a mid-rising tone (tone 2). The more common one operates on lexemes with a non-high level, non-mid-rising tone (i.e. tones 3, 4, 5, and 6 in Jyutping and Yale; see Cantonese phonology for further information on the tones in Cantonese), transforming them into a mid-rising tone (tone 2). For some speakers, this changed tone is slightly lower than the citation mid-rising tone.

Resulting In Mid-Rising Tone (Tone 2)
Characters	Jyutping Romanisation	English Translation
耳環	ji^{5} waan^{4-2}	earring
男人	naam^{4} jan^{4-2}	man
作文	zok^{3} man^{4-2}	essay
港女	gong^{2} neoi^{5-2}	Kong Girl
眼鏡	ngaan^{5} geng^{3-2}	glasses
舖頭	pou^{3} tau^{4-2}	store
蠄蟧	kam^{4} lou^{4-2}	spider

In other lexemes, the tone of the last syllable becomes a high level tone (tone 1 in Yale and Jyutping). This is especially true if the penultimate syllable (the syllable before the syllable with the changed tone) already has tone 1 as its tone. For some words with the high falling tone, the tone may also change to the high level tone via the same process, although an example is currently needed to verify this.

Resulting In High Level Tone (Tone 1)
Characters	Jyutping Romanisation	English Translation
今晚	gam^{1} maan^{5-1}	tonight
包尾	baau^{1} mei^{5-1}	to come last
自己	zi^{6} gei^{2-1}	oneself
蠄蟧絲網	kam^{4} lou^{4} si^{1} mong^{5-1}	spider web, cobweb

There are also a number of words in Cantonese that can be either a verb or a noun, where the verb sense keeps the original tone of the character, but the noun sense has a tone change.

Character	Jyutping Romanisation Verb Sense	English Meaning	Jyutping Romanisation Noun Sense	English Meaning
話	waa^{5}	speak, tell	waa^{5-2}	speech, language
帶	daai^{3}	bring	daai^{3-2}	belt
磅	bong^{6}	to weigh	bong^{6-2}	a scale
犯	faan^{6}	to commit a crime	faan^{6-2}	a criminal

Some characters are nouns in both pronunciations, but they have a broader meaning with the original tone, and a narrower meaning with the changed tone.

Character	Jyutping Romanisation Original Tone	English Meaning	Jyutping Romanisation Changed Tone	English Meaning
糖	tong^{4}	sugar	tong^{4-2}	candy
皮	pei^{4}	skin	pei^{4-2}	leather
銀	ngan^{4}	silver	ngan^{4-2}	coin

The use of a high rising tone in marking changed tone in many Yue varieties of Chinese implies one possible origin in diminutive morphemes, much in the same way that erhua (儿化) functions in Standard Mandarin and in the Beijing dialect. In Cantonese, several diminutive morphemes have been proposed as the original one, among them 兒 /jiː˥/ "son" (in its high level tone form) and 子 /t͡siː˧˥/ "child". Thus the changed tone may be the relic of the contraction of the main syllable with these diminutive morphemes.

A separate tone change that operates on verbs has also been attested, marking the perfective aspect.

Base verb			Verb After Changed Tone	
Verb	Jyutping	English Meaning	Jyutping	English Meaning
去	heoi^{3}	go	heoi^{3-2}	went
發	faat^{3}	emit	faat^{3-2}	emitted
賣	maai^{6}	sell	maai^{6-2}	sold
嚟	lai^{4}	come	lai^{4-2}	came
買	maai^{5}	buy	maai^{5-2}	bought
落	lok^{6}	fall	lok^{6-2}	fell

This is believed to be the result of the merger of the perfective marker 咗 /t͡sɔː˧˥/ into the verb, and is thus also found in other Yue varieties, such as the dialect of Xiaolan in Zhongshan; it is also found in Hakka Chinese varieties, such as some varieties in Heyuan in northern Guangdong, as well as in Shicheng and Yudu in southern Jiangxi. This tone morpheme is even said to predominate over the overt perfective markers in certain areas such as Zhaoqing, Xinhui, Foshan and Shunde, giving rise to a form of tonal ablaut, although this is associated with the speech of the older generation.

There is also a tone change that operates on the first or second character of some reduplications, predominantly of nouns and nouns of address, like with “爺爺” and ”哥哥“.

Characters	Jyutping Romanisation	English Meaning
仔仔	zai^{2-4} zai^{2}	son
啦啦仔	laa^{1-4} laa^{1} zai^{2}	urban punk
爺爺	ye^{4} ye^{4-2}	grandfather
哥哥	go^{1-4} go^{1}	older brother
肥肥	fei^{4} fei^{4-2}	fat

Taishanese also exhibits changed tones. It is realized in some cases as an additional high floating tone to end of the mid level, low level, mid falling and low falling tones; this results in new contours for Taishanese, namely mid rising, low rising, mid dipping and low dipping respectively. The final pitch of these changed tones may be even higher in pitch than the citation high level tone. Another changed tone occurs where the expected tone is replaced by the low falling tone. These two are combined in certain cases, with the result that the expected tone is replaced by the low dipping tone, such as the change of the verb 刷 /tʃat˧/ "to brush" into the noun 刷 /tʃat˨˩˥/ "a brush".
