= Jiumen Hui Ethnic Township =

Jiumen Hui Ethnic Township 九门回族乡
- Ethnic township
- Location in Hebei
- Coordinates: 38°06′28″N 114°43′57″E
- Country: People's Republic of China
- Province: Hebei
- Prefecture-level city: Shijiazhuang
- County: Xingtang
- Village-level divisions: 13 villages
- Elevation: 64 m (210 ft)

Population
  - Total: 40,998
- Time zone: UTC+8 (China Standard)
- Area code: 0311

Jiumen Hui Ethnic Township (simplified Chinese: 九门回族乡; traditional Chinese: 九門回族鄉; pinyin: Jiǔmén Huízú Xiāng; lit. 'nine doors') is an ethnic township under the administration of Gaocheng City in southwestern Hebei province, China, located about 14 kilometres (8.7 mi) northwest of downtown Gaocheng. As of 2011, it has 13 villages under its administration.

== See also ==
- List of township-level divisions of Hebei
