= Lianzhou, Hebei =

Lianzhou 廉州镇
- Town
- Location in Hebei
- Coordinates: 38°02′12″N 114°50′19″E
- Country: People's Republic of China
- Province: Hebei
- Prefecture-level city: Shijiazhuang
- District: Gaocheng District
- Village-level divisions: 47 residential communities
- Elevation: 58 m (190 ft)
- Time zone: UTC+8 (China Standard)
- Postal code: 052160
- Area code: 0311

Lianzhou (Chinese: 廉州; pinyin: Liánzhōu) is a town and the seat of Gaocheng District, Shijiazhuang in southwestern Hebei province, China. As of 2018, it has 47 residential communities (居委会) under its administration.

== See also ==
- List of township-level divisions of Hebei
