= Xing'an, Hebei =

Coordinates: 38°02′06″N 114°54′09″E

Xing'an, Gaocheng 兴安镇
- Town

Chinese transcription(s)
- Interactive map of Xing'an, Gaocheng
- Country: China
- Province: Hebei
- Prefecture: Shijiazhuang
- District: Gaocheng
- Time zone: UTC+8 (China Standard Time)

Xing'an, Gaocheng (Chinese: 兴安镇) is a township-level division of Gaocheng, Shijiazhuang, Hebei, China.

== See also ==
- List of township-level divisions of Hebei
