= Nanying, Gaocheng District =

Coordinates: 37.95273°N 114.80577°E

Nanying 南营镇
- Town

Chinese transcription(s)
- Interactive map of Nanying
- Country: China
- Province: Hebei
- Prefecture: Shijiazhuang
- District: Gaocheng
- Time zone: UTC+8 (China Standard Time)

Nanying (Chinese: 南营镇) is a township-level division of Gaocheng, Shijiazhuang, Hebei, China.

== See also ==
- List of township-level divisions of Hebei
