= Cantonese nasal-stop alternation =

In Cantonese phonology, a close relationship exists between the nasal codas (-m, -n, -ŋ) and the stop codas (-p, -t, -k). These two types of codas can also be classified into three homorganic pairs: the bilabial m/p, the dental n/t, and the velar ŋ/k. Some of the correspondences trace back to Old Chinese, or developed as a historical coincidence of sound change. However, many pairs exist that are solely Cantonese and not found in Classical Chinese.

== The phonological alternation ==
Apart from phonetical association, the homorganic pairs are also semantically related. For some characters (or words) with syllables ending in nasals, there are semantically similar characters which have the homorganic stops. For example, both dam3 揼 and dap1 耷 means 'to hang down'. The initial consonants and the vowels of the alternating pair are identical while the terminal nasal /-m/ and stop /-p/ are a homorganic pair. In Cantonese phonology, this interesting phenomenon is known as nasal-stop alternation (陽入對轉), mainly an alternation of homorganic consonants between nasal and stop finals. In other dialects, it could be oral-nasal or oral-stop alternation.

Regarding the initial consonants, a few items may alternate between aspirated and unaspirated initial stops, e.g. kim4 拑 'to pinch' and gip6 挟 'to squeeze together'. As for tones, high or low tones on syllables with nasal codas usually (but not always) correspond to high or low tones on syllables with stop codas, e.g. ngam4 吟 'to grumble' has a low tone whereas ngap1 噏 'to babble' has a high tone.

Many of these characters are colloquial verbs which lack standard Chinese characters as their written forms. For example, there is not a widely accepted character for jip3 'to pickle in salt'. Consequently, the homorganic character jim1 腌 is also used to represent both syllables. The same is true for doek3 啄 'to peck' being used to stand for doeng1 as well.

As for their semantics or usage, the paired characters are not completely equivalent or interchangeable in every case. The colloquial verb kam2 冚 seems to be more commonly used than the corresponding kap1 扱, both meaning 'to cover on top'. On the other hand, fing6 捹 and fik6 扐 both mean 'to throw away; to swing an object in the hand' and are interchangeable; the same is also true for ning1 拎 and nik1 搦 'to carry in the hand'.

== Different theories ==
Most linguists view the syllables with nasal codas as the more basic originals while the stops are the colloquial variants. A few opine that there are an equal number of word pairings that are originated from the syllables with stop codas. However, it is generally agreed that the usage of the nasal members are less restricted than their stop counterparts.

Other linguists regard the alternation between homorganic final consonants in pairs of semantically-related words as a feature widely found among languages of Southeast Asia as well as south China (Chuang-chia and Hmong for example). Such paired words belong to a "word-family", a term first used by Bernhard Karlgren (1934) to refer to sets of words with similar (but not identical) sound in Archaic Chinese that were related in meaning, representing relics of morphological processes. Similarly, Bauer notes that the Cantonese phenomenon is believed to be a remnant of an ancient word-derivation process, now no longer productive, in which different types of suffixes (causative and transitive) were attached to lexical roots.

== Some examples ==
In the Cantonese syllabary, there are about 50 pairs of such characters that show alternation between homorganic nasal and stop codas. The following is a list of some examples for reference:

Nasal codas			Stop codas		
laam5	覽	look at	laap3	䁽	glance at
dam3	揼	to hang down, sag	dap1	𢱕	to hang down, droop
kam2	冚	to cover on top	kap1	扱	to cover on top
ngam4	吟	to grumble	ngap1	噏	to babble, gossip
jim1	腌	to pickle in salt	jip3	醃	to pickle in salt
saan3	散	to disperse, spread	saat3	撒	to scatter, sow, spill
ngan3	䟴	to stand on tiptoes	ngat6	卼	to stand on tiptoes
bin6	辨	to distinguish	bit6	別	to identify
kin2	掀	to open up (book); remove	kit3	揭	to open up (book); unveil
fun1	寬	spacious	fut3	闊	wide
cing3	掅	to lift up (luggage)	cik1	摵	to pull up (trousers)
fing6	捹	to fling away; swing (a limb)	fik6	扐	to fling away; swing (a flag)
ning1	拎	to carry by hand	nik1	搦	to carry by hand
tong3	趟	to slide open (a door)	tok3	托	to push up (a bar)
doeng1	啄	to peck	doek3	剁	to cut
caam5	劖	to prick	caap3	插	to pierce
