= Gangshang, Hebei =

Gangshang 岗上镇
- Town
- Location in Hebei
- Coordinates: 38°02′49″N 114°41′26″E
- Country: People's Republic of China
- Province: Hebei
- Prefecture-level city: Shijiazhuang
- County-level city: Gaocheng
- Village-level divisions: 20 villages
- Elevation: 64 m (210 ft)
- Time zone: UTC+8 (China Standard)
- Area code: 0311

Gangshang (simplified Chinese: 岗上; traditional Chinese: 崗上; pinyin: Gǎngshàng) is a town under the administration of Gaocheng City in southwestern Hebei province, China, located approximately halfway between Shijiazhuang and Gaocheng and just south of G1811 Huanghua–Shijiazhuang Expressway. As of 2011, it has 11 villages under its administration.

== See also ==
- List of township-level divisions of Hebei
