= Gaocheng, Shijiazhuang =

District of Shijiazhuang, China

Gaocheng 藁城区
- District
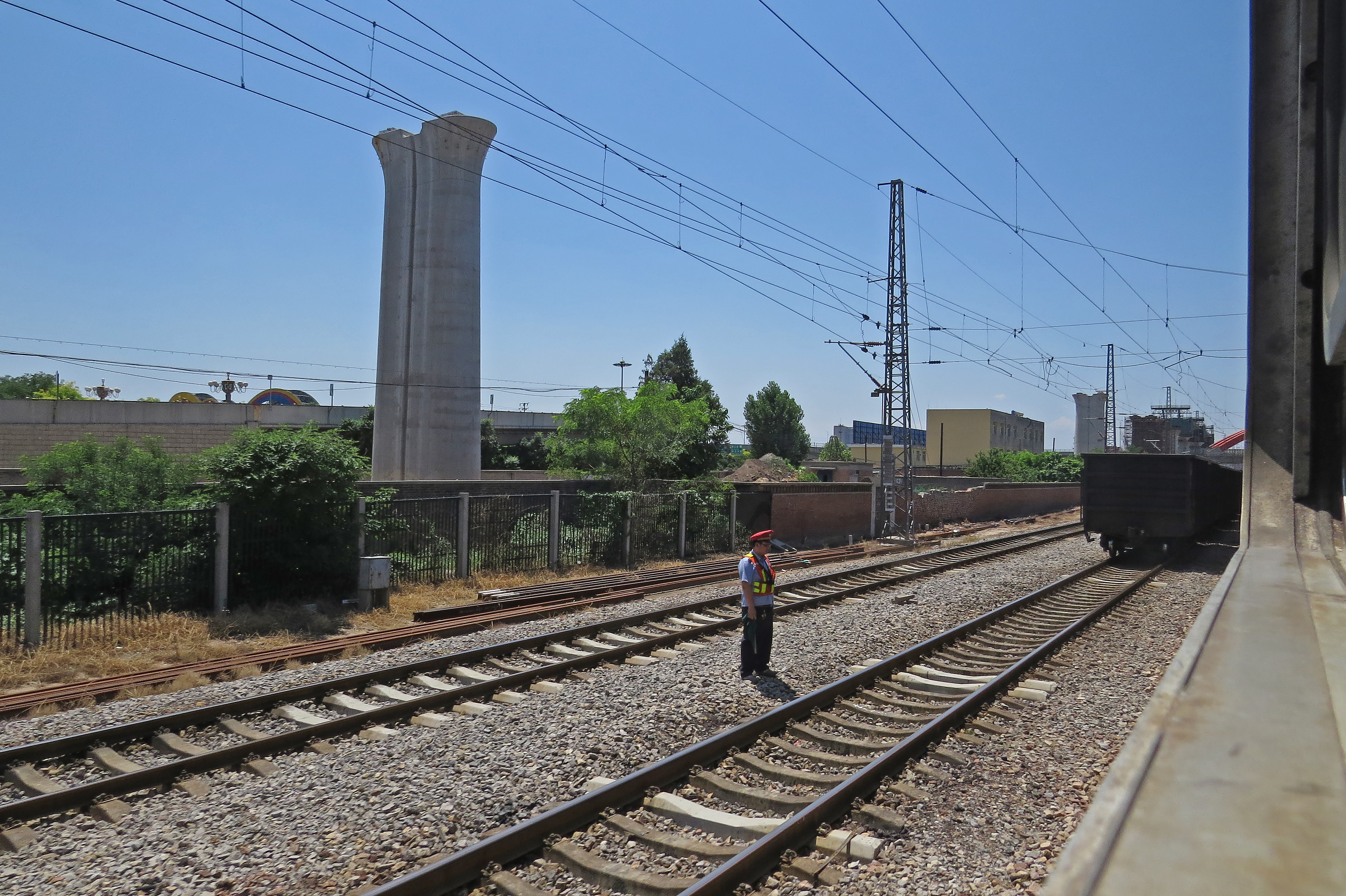
- Liangcun railway station
- Interactive map of Gaocheng
- Location in Hebei
- Coordinates: 38°01′19″N 114°50′49″E
- Country: People's Republic of China
- Province: Hebei
- Prefecture-level city: Shijiazhuang
- Township-level divisions: 13 towns 1 ethnic township
- Municipal seat: Lianzhou

Area
  - Total: 836 km^{2} (323 sq mi)
- Elevation: 57 m (187 ft)

Population (2010)
  - Total: 775,100
  - Density: 927/km^{2} (2,400/sq mi)
- Time zone: UTC+8 (China Standard)
- Postal code: 052100
- Area code: 0311
- Website: www.gc.gov.cn/web/index.htm

Gaocheng (simplified Chinese: 藁城区; traditional Chinese: 藁城區; pinyin: Gǎochéng Qū; lit. 'Straw City') is one of eight districts of the prefecture-level city of Shijiazhuang, the capital of Hebei Province, North China, on the upper reaches of the Hutuo River (滹沱河). The city has a total area of 836 square kilometres (323 sq mi) and in 2010 had a population of 743,000.

== History ==
In 113 BCE, during the Western Han Dynasty, Cheng County (城縣) was established, and renamed as Gaocheng County (藁城縣) during the Yuan Dynasty. The present county-level was established in July 1989.

== Administrative divisions ==
There are 13 towns and 1 township.

Towns:

- Lianzhou (廉州镇), Gangshang (岗上镇), Nandong (南董镇), Xing'an (兴安镇), Nanmeng (南孟镇), Meihua (梅花镇), Chang'an (常安镇), Zengcun (增村镇), Xiguan (西关镇), Zhangjiazhuang (张家庄镇), Jiashizhuang (贾市庄镇), Qiutou (丘头镇), Nanying (南营镇)

Townships:

- Jiumen Hui Ethnic Township (九门回族乡)

== Climate ==
Climate data for Gaocheng, elevation 54 m (177 ft), (1991–2020 normals, extremes 1981–2010)
Month	Jan	Feb	Mar	Apr	May	Jun	Jul	Aug	Sep	Oct	Nov	Dec	Year
Record high °C (°F)	16.5 (61.7)	24.7 (76.5)	31.6 (88.9)	32.8 (91.0)	38.0 (100.4)	40.9 (105.6)	41.9 (107.4)	37.2 (99.0)	37.1 (98.8)	33.7 (92.7)	26.7 (80.1)	21.5 (70.7)	41.9 (107.4)
Mean daily maximum °C (°F)	3.4 (38.1)	7.7 (45.9)	14.7 (58.5)	21.6 (70.9)	27.4 (81.3)	32.4 (90.3)	32.7 (90.9)	30.9 (87.6)	27.2 (81.0)	20.8 (69.4)	11.5 (52.7)	4.7 (40.5)	19.6 (67.3)
Daily mean °C (°F)	−2.5 (27.5)	1.3 (34.3)	8.1 (46.6)	15.1 (59.2)	21.1 (70.0)	26.0 (78.8)	27.5 (81.5)	25.8 (78.4)	21.1 (70.0)	14.4 (57.9)	5.6 (42.1)	−0.8 (30.6)	13.6 (56.4)
Mean daily minimum °C (°F)	−7.2 (19.0)	−3.7 (25.3)	2.4 (36.3)	9.1 (48.4)	14.9 (58.8)	20.1 (68.2)	23.0 (73.4)	21.7 (71.1)	16.3 (61.3)	9.3 (48.7)	1.2 (34.2)	−4.9 (23.2)	8.5 (47.3)
Record low °C (°F)	−19.3 (−2.7)	−18.1 (−0.6)	−8.5 (16.7)	−1.8 (28.8)	4.4 (39.9)	11.0 (51.8)	16.0 (60.8)	13.4 (56.1)	6.0 (42.8)	−3.0 (26.6)	−14.6 (5.7)	−23.4 (−10.1)	−23.4 (−10.1)
Average precipitation mm (inches)	2.3 (0.09)	5.0 (0.20)	9.0 (0.35)	25.4 (1.00)	34.9 (1.37)	63.7 (2.51)	118 (4.6)	121.4 (4.78)	42.6 (1.68)	26.0 (1.02)	14.4 (0.57)	3.1 (0.12)	465.8 (18.29)
Average precipitation days (≥ 0.1 mm)	1.8	2.4	2.7	4.9	6.1	8.3	10.9	10.3	6.7	5.3	3.6	1.8	64.8
Average snowy days	2.4	2.6	1.1	0.2	0	0	0	0	0	0	1.3	2.5	10.1
Average relative humidity (%)	58	53	50	56	60	59	73	77	72	66	67	62	63
Mean monthly sunshine hours	147.1	162.9	211.3	237.8	267.0	234.2	196.2	197.3	193.6	184.1	152.6	143.2	2,327.3
Percentage possible sunshine	48	53	57	60	60	53	44	47	53	54	51	49	52
Source: China Meteorological Administration

== Transport ==
- Shijiazhuang−Dezhou railway
- G1811 Huanghua−Shijiazhuang Expressway
- China National Highway 307
