= Naamyam =

Chinese folk music

Naamyam (Chinese: 南音; Jyutping: naam4 jam1; pinyin: nányīn; lit. "southern tunes") is a unique local narrative singing tradition in Cantonese in the form of rap-like rhyme, which is different from the nanguan (lit. "southern pipes") tradition originating from Southern Fujian. Naamyam is originated in the Pearl River Delta in the late Qing Dynasty and was very popular in Hong Kong, Canton, Macau and other Cantonese-speaking areas. A singer was traditionally accompanied by one or more string instruments such as the zheng (bridge zither with 16 metal strings) and yehu (2-stringed vertical fiddle with coconut-shell resonator and wooden soundboard).

Naamyam in a broad sense refers to Cantonese tunes, including Dei Seoi Naamyam (地水南音, lit. “earth and water” Naamyam), Hei Kuk Naamyam (戲曲南音, lit. Opera Naamyam), Lou Geoi Naamyam (老舉南音, lit. Prostitute Naamyam).

A singer would be engaged for a single performance or for regular performances over an extended period of time. Famous naamyam singers included Chung Tak (1860–1929), Dou Wun (杜焕; 1910–1979), Yuen Siu-fai and Au Kwan-cheung.

Dei Seoi Naamyam was a unique regional narrative singing tradition in Cantonese that became popular in the 20th century when teahouse culture flourished in Canton, Hong Kong and Macao. In addition to teahouses, Dei Seoi Naamyam was also performed on the streets and in brothels. Dei Seoi Naamyam normally sung by blind people, (respectfully called the blind master (瞽師). Some famous songs include the Hegemon-King Bids His Lady Farewell (霸王别姬), Nan Siu Yi (男燒衣) and Nui Siu Yi (女燒衣). Dei Seoi Naamyam began to decline in the late 1920s, due to the popularity of Cantonese opera. Dei Seoi Naamyam was adapted into Cantonese Opera and become Hei Kuk Naamyam.

Naamyam was often sung in pornographic venues, so many selections involve male and female love. Such pieces are also known as "Lou Geoi Naamyam". Lou Geoi Naamyam was sung by prostitutes in brothels and opium dens. There are also "Pipa Zai" (琵琶仔), which are girls who only play music but do not provide sexual service. Since the 1930s, Hong Kong has banned prostitution, brothels and opium dens were closed and the Lou Geoi Naamyam disappeared.

== See also ==
- Cantonese opera
- Cantopop
- Huangmei Opera
- Beijing Opera
- Music of China
- Music of Hong Kong
