= Moss (disambiguation) =

Moss is a small, soft, non-vascular plant that does not have flowers or seeds.

Moss may also refer to:

== People ==
- Moss (surname)
- Moss (given name)

== Places ==
=== United Kingdom ===
- Moss, Argyll and Bute, a location in Scotland
- Moss, Highland, a location in Scotland
- Moss, South Yorkshire, England
- Moss, Wrexham, a location in Wales
  - Moss Valley, Wrexham, Wales
- The Moss, a brook in England

=== United States ===
- Moss Landing, California or Moss, California
- Moss, Mississippi
- Moss, Tennessee
- Moss, West Virginia
- Mount Moss, a mountain in Colorado

=== Elsewhere ===
- Moss (Martian crater)
- Moss, Norway

== Arts, entertainment, and media ==
=== Fictional characters ===
- Maurice Moss, a character from the British sitcom The IT Crowd
- Moss people, forest-dwelling creatures in German folklore
- Moss Man, a fictional character from the Masters of the Universe franchise
- Moss (Pikmin), Olimar's dog in Pikmin 4

=== Music ===
- Moss (Mike Gordon album), a 2010 album by Mike Gordon
- Moss (Maya Hawke album), a 2022 album by Maya Hawke
- Moss (band), a UK doom metal band
- "Moss", a song by the Smashing Pumpkins from Atum: A Rock Opera in Three Acts, 2023
- MoSS, Canadian rapper

=== Other arts, entertainment, and media ===
- Moss (video game), a 2018 video game
- Moss: Book II, a 2022 video game
- "Moss", a strip in the British comic Buster
- Moss, a Korean webtoon by Yoon Tae-ho
  - Moss (film), a 2010 South Korean film, an adaptation of the webtoon
- Moss, a 2018 American film by Daniel Peddle

== Plants ==
- Clubmoss, a pteridophyte plant
- Spanish moss, a flowering bromeliad plant that grows hanging from tree branches
- Spikemoss, a pteridophyte plant

== Other uses ==
- Moss (language), a musical language designed by Jackson Moore
- Moss (company), a spend management platform based in Germany
- Moss Bros, a menswear outfitters in the United Kingdom
- Moss Brothers Aircraft, an English aircraft manufacturer (1936–1955)
- Moss FK, a Norwegian football club
- Tupolev Tu-126 (NATO reporting name: Moss), a Soviet AWACS aircraft
- A common term for a peat bog in northern England and Scotland

== See also ==
- Mosses (disambiguation)
- Irish moss (disambiguation)
- MOS (disambiguation)
- MOSS (disambiguation)
- Mosse (disambiguation)
