= MOS =

MOS or Mos may refer to:

== People ==
- Mos, nickname of Thai singer Patiparn Patavekarn, also referred to as Mos Patiparn

== Places and transportation ==
- Mos, Spain, a municipality in Galicia, Spain in the province of Pontevedra
- Museum of Science (Boston), in Massachusetts, US
- Ma On Shan (town), in the New Territories of Hong Kong
  - Ma On Shan station, MTR station code
- MOS, German vehicle plate identification code for Neckar-Odenwald-Kreis (after its capital, Mosbach)
- MoS, Motorways of the Sea, a concept in European Union transport policy

== Arts, media, computing, and electronics ==
- Moment of symmetry, a concept in music theory
- "Man on the street" (vox populi) segments in broadcasting
- Manual of style, a guide for writing, layout, or typography
- MOS (filmmaking), a term for a film segment with no soundtrack
- Media Object Server, a protocol used in newsroom computer systems
- Mean opinion score, a measure of the perceived quality of a signal
- My Oracle Support, an Oracle Corporation support site
- Mobile operating system, for mobile devices
- MOS (operating system), a Soviet Unix clone
- Acorn MOS, an operating system
- MOS Technology, a defunct semiconductor company
- MOSFET, a type of field-effect transistor
- MOS (brand), an American cable management hardware product line

== Government and military ==
- Ministry of Security (Puntland), a Somali government ministry
- Ministry of Supply, a former British government ministry that co-ordinated military supplies
- Master of the Sword, the head of physical education at the West Point military academy
- Military occupation specialty code, used by the U.S. military to identify a specific job

== Food ==
- Mos, a traditional dish of the Nivkh people
- MOS Burger, a fast-food restaurant chain

== Languages ==
- Mos language, an aboriginal Mon–Khmer language of Malaya and Thailand
- Mossi language, ISO 639 alpha-2 language code

== Other uses ==
- Mos, an uncommon singular form of "mores" (customary behavior)
- Model output statistics, a weather-forecasting technique
- Mathematical Optimization Society
- Margin on services, an Australian financial reporting concept
- Mos, a financial company founded by Amira Yahyaoui
- The Mosaic Company (NYSE: MOS), an American fertilizer and mining company
- Mannan oligosaccharide-based nutritional supplements
- MOS (gene)
- Morvan's syndrome (MoS)

== See also ==
- Mo's Restaurants, American restaurant chain in Oregon
- Molybdenum disulfide (MoS_{2})
- Mos Def, American hip-hop artist and actor
- Mos Eisley, a fictional city which first appeared in Star Wars Episode 4: A New Hope
- PC-MOS/386
- Man of Steel (disambiguation)
- MDOS (disambiguation)
