= Thomas Moss =

Thomas Moss may refer to:

- Thomas Moss (jurist) (1836–1881), Canadian jurist and politician
- Thomas Moss (minister) (1740–1808), English poet and cleric
- Thomas Moss, black grocery owner and friend of Ida B. Wells, murdered during the People's Grocery lynchings
- Tom Moss (1928/29–2004), staffer to Strom Thurmond, second African-American Senate staffer
- Tom Moss (politician) (1928–2015), American politician

== See also ==
- Moss (surname)
