= Moss (surname) =

Moss is a surname related either to the Old English mos – a peat-bog, to the Irish "Maolmona", an ancient Gaelic devotee, or to the Hebrew "Moses" (מֹשֶׁה) and can be of either Jewish, Irish or English language origin.

== History ==
- Arlene B. Nichols Moss, American chair of the Daughters of the American Revolution
- Roger Moss (born 1940), American historian
- Stephen Moss (b. 1960), British naturalist

== Literature ==
- Howard Moss (1922–1987), American poet
- Jason Moss (writer) (1975–2006), American writer and attorney
- John Errington Moss (born 1940), Canadian author
- Mary Moss (1864–1914), American author and literary critic
- Sarah Moss (born 1975), English writer and academic
- Thylias Moss (born 1954), American poet

== Music ==
- David Moss (born 1949), American composer, percussionist and singer
- Howard Moss (songwriter) (born 1975), Anglo-Irish singer songwriter and guitarist
- Ian Moss (born 1955), Australian musician
- James Moss (born 1971), American gospel musician and composer best known for his stage name J. Moss
- Jerry Moss (1935–2023), A&M Records founder
- Jon Moss (born 1957), British drummer with Culture Club
- Katie Moss (1881–1947), British singer and composer
- Nick Moss (born 1969), American blues musician
- Paul Moss, New Zealand record company executive
- Bow Wow (born Shad Gregory Moss in 1987), American rapper
- Wayne Moss (1938–2026), American guitarist, bassist and songwriter

== Politics ==
- Allan A. Moss (1854–1929), American mayor
- Annie Lee Moss (1905–1996), African American woman who was accused of being a Communist infiltrator in the Pentagon
- Frank Moss (1911–2003), Democrat United States Senator from Utah
- Hunter Holmes Moss Jr. (1874–1916), American lawyer and politician
- John E. Moss (1915–1997), American politician
- J. McKenzie Moss (1868–1929), American politician and judge
- Linda Moss, South African politician
- Malcolm Moss (born 1943), British Conservative Party Member of Parliament
- Matthew Moss (1863–1946), Australian member of parliament
- Ralph W. Moss (U.S. Representative) (1862–1919)
- Randolph Moss (born 1961), American judge and lawyer
- Reginald Moss (1913–1995), British Labour Party Member of Parliament 1955–1959
- Wandrea' ArShaye Moss, American election official
- William P. Moss (1897–1985), American lawyer and politician

== Sports ==
- Alan Moss (1930–2019), English cricketer
- Albert Moss (cricketer) (1863–1945), English and New Zealand cricketer
- Alfred Moss (1896–1972), British racing driver
- Avery Moss (born 1994), American football player
- Bill Moss (1933–2010), British racing driver
- Brad Moss (born 1971), American bridge player
- Brandon Moss (born 1983), American baseball player
- Brent Moss (1972–2022), American football player best known for his collegiate career
- Charles Malcolm 'Mal' Moss (1905–1983), American baseball pitcher
- Chris Moss (born 1980), American basketball player
- Damian Moss (born 1976), Australian baseball player
- David Moss (ice hockey) (born 1981), American professional hockey player
- Drew Moss (born 2003), American football player
- Eric Moss (1974–2019), American football player
- Frank Moss (goalkeeper) (1909–1970), English football goalkeeper and manager
- Frank Moss (half-back) (1895–1965), English football half-back
- Gail Moss (born 1938), American bridge player
- Glen Moss (born 1983), New Zealand soccer player
- Greg Moss (born 1982), Canadian football player
- Harold Moss (1929–2020), American businessman and politician
- Jarvis Moss (born 1984), American football player
- Jeff Moss (cricketer) (born 1947), Australian cricketer
- Jonathan Moss (cricketer) (born 1975), Australian cricketer
- John Moss (umpire) (1864–1950), English cricket umpire
- John Henry Moss (1918–2009), American baseball executive
- Johnny Moss (1907–1995), professional poker player, 3-time world champion of poker
- Les Moss (1925–2012), American baseball player and manager
- Le'Veon Moss (born 2002), American football player
- Miller Moss (born 2002), American football player
- Neil Moss (footballer) (born 1975), English footballer
- Pat Moss (1934–2008), British rally driver
- Perry Moss (1926–2014), American football player, coach, and executive
- Perry Moss (basketball) (born 1958), American professional basketball player
- Perry Moss (golfer) (born 1969), American professional golfer
- Peter Moss (basketball) (born c. 1959/60), American college basketball player
- Randy Moss (born 1977), American football player
- Randy Moss (sports reporter) (born 1959), American sports announcer and journalist
- Reginald Moss (1868–1956), English cricketer
- Riley Moss (born 2000), American football player
- Santana Moss (born 1979), American football player
- Sinorice Moss (born 1983), American football player
- Stirling Moss (1929–2020), British racing driver
- Tanya Moss (born 1964), New Zealand gymnast
- Thaddeus Moss (born 1998), American football player
- Zack Moss (born 1997), American football player

== Television and film ==
- Arnold Moss (1910–1989), American actor
- Bertha Moss (1919–2008), Argentine actress
- Carrie-Anne Moss (born 1967), Canadian actress
- Donna Moss, fictional character from The West Wing
- Elisabeth Moss (born 1982), American actress
- Jeff Moss (1942–1998), Sesame Street creator
- Jennifer Moss (1945–2006), British actress
- Laura Moss (born 1973), American actress
- Maurice Moss, fictional character from The IT Crowd
- Ronn Moss (born 1952), American actor, musician and singer/songwriter
- Stewart Moss (1937–2017), American actor, writer, and director

== Theatre ==
- Chloe Moss (born 1976), British dramatist
- Edward Moss (1852–1912), British theatre promoter
- Strafford Moss (1868–1941), British musical theatre tenor

== Other ==
- Colin Moss (artist), (1914–2005), British artist
- Cynthia F. Moss (born 1957), American neuroscientist and professor of psychology and brain sciences
- Cynthia Moss (born 1940), American wildlife researcher and author
- Emani Moss (2003–2013), American murder victim
- Frank Moss (lawyer) (1860–1920), criminal lawyer and Assistant District Attorney for New York City in the early 20th century
- Frank Moss (technologist) (born 1949), American computer scientist
- Frank A. Moss, (1862–1940), Australian mining engineer
- Gérard Moss (1955–2022), Brazilian aviator and environmentalist
- Jacqueline Moss (1927–2005), American art historian
- Joel M. Moss (born 1943), American nuclear physicist
- John Moss (lawyer) (1890–1976), British social services worker
- John Moss (Philadelphia) (1771–1847), Philadelphia merchant, Parnas (President) of Congregation Mikveh Israel involved in the Damascus Affair
- John C. Moss (1838–1892), invented the first practicable photo-engraving process in 1863
- John Francis Moss (educational administrator) (1844–1907), Sheffield education pioneer
- John Thomas Moss (1839–1880), American frontiersman, prospector, and miner
- Kate Moss (born 1974), British supermodel
- Leonard Moss (1932–2021), British Anglican priest
- Llewelyn Moss, protagonist in the novel and film No Country for Old Men
- Lydia Moss (1816–1908), American bank president and philanthropist
- Mary Moss (1791–1875), mother of William Booth
- Murray Moss, American design expert
- Neil Moss (caver) (1938–1959), English caver
- P. Buckley Moss (born 1933), American artist
- Peter Moss (1938–2017), British colonial administrator who later became a park ranger, conservationist, and pioneer of eco-tourism
- Preacher Moss (born 1967), American comedian
- Ralph W. Moss (writer) (born 1943), American writer
- Sanford Alexander Moss (1872–1946), American aviation engineer
- Tiffany Moss, American murderer of Emani Moss
- William Lorenzo Moss (1876–1957), American physician

== See also ==
- Hebraization of surnames
- Moss (disambiguation)
- Mosse
