= Sunshine City (Hong Kong) =

Private housing estate in Ma On Shan, Hong Kong

Coordinates: 22.4244°N 114.2321°E

MOSTown
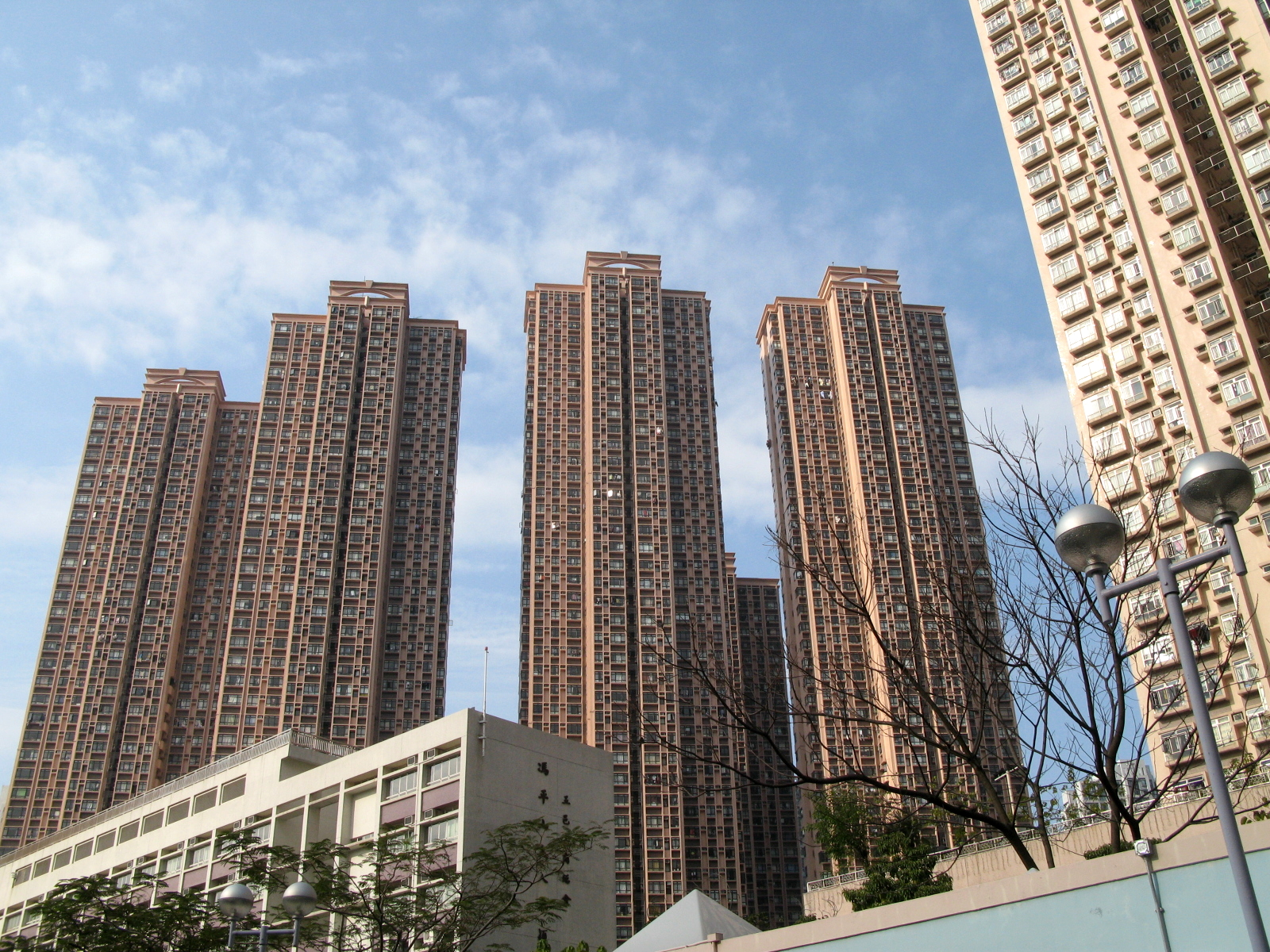
- Residential towers of Sunshine City (Phase 4)
- Traditional Chinese: 新港城
- Simplified Chinese: 新港城
- Literal meaning: new harbour city
Transcriptions
Yue: Cantonese
- Jyutping: san1 gong2 sing4

Sunshine City (Chinese: 新港城) is a private housing estate in the town centre of Ma On Shan in the Sha Tin District of Hong Kong. It was developed by Henderson Land Development, and contains a series of 20 high-rise residential tower blocks and a series of shopping arcades.

== Residential towers ==
The residential towers, containing in excess of 4,700 residential units, were constructed in five phases during the 1990s. The majority of units are between 40 and 60 square metres. Each phase was built together with a shopping arcade. Phase 5 is also known as Tolo Place (海濤居).

- Phase 1: Located in 18 On Shing St.
- Phase 2: Located in 22 On Shing St.
- Phase 3: Located in 8 On Shing St
- Phase 4: Located in 18 On Luk St
- Phase 5 (Tolo Place): Located in 628 Sai Sha Rd

== Shopping centre ==
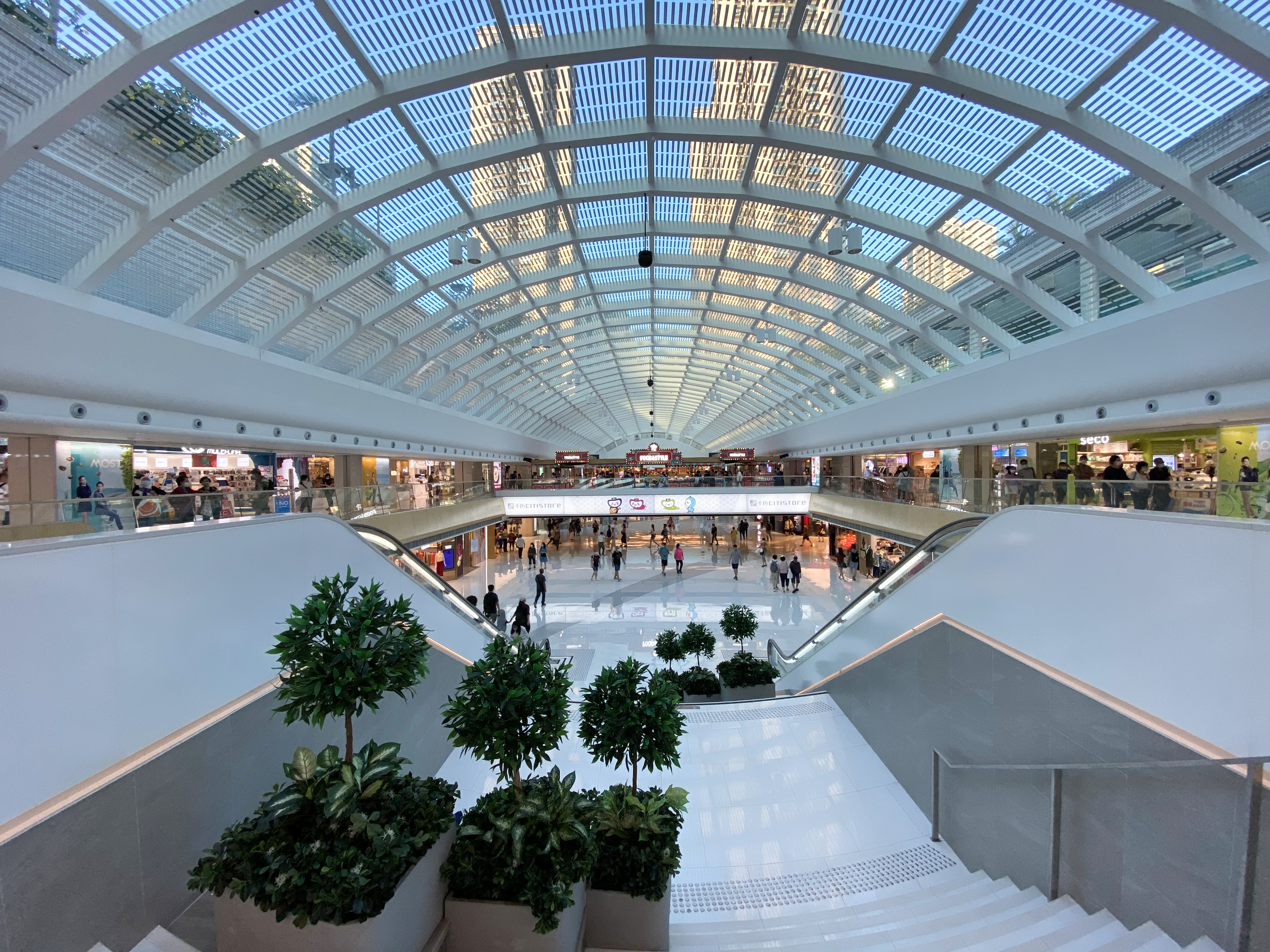
Atrium of the MOSTown shopping mall.

The shopping centres for phases 1 to 3 are relatively small. MOSTown, formerly named Sunshine City Plaza (新港城中心), the shopping arcade built with phase 4, is by far the largest, and has retail floor space of in excess of 175,000 square metres (1,880,000 sq ft). Sunshine Bazaar (新港城廣場) is the name given to Phase 5 of the mall.

== See also ==
- Private housing estates in Sha Tin District
