= MOSS =

MOSS may refer to:

== Technology ==
- Map Overlay and Statistical System, a geographic information system (GIS)
- Microsoft SharePoint, known in its 2007 version as Microsoft Office SharePoint Server (MOSS)
- MIME Object Security Services, an IETF security protocol
- Mobile submarine simulator, a sonar decoy
- Morocco Oukaimeden Sky Survey, an astronomical survey of Solar System objects in Morocco

== Other uses ==
- Market Oriented Sector Selective talks, trade negotiations between the United States and Japan in 1984
- MOSS (company), a Japanese video game company
- MoSS, a Canadian hip-hop producer
- Mini One Stop Shop, the European Union VAT system for cross-border B2C e-services.

== See also ==
- Moss (disambiguation)
- MOS (disambiguation)
