= MOSTown =

Shopping centre in Ma On Shan, Hong Kong

Coordinates: 22.4244°N 114.2321°E

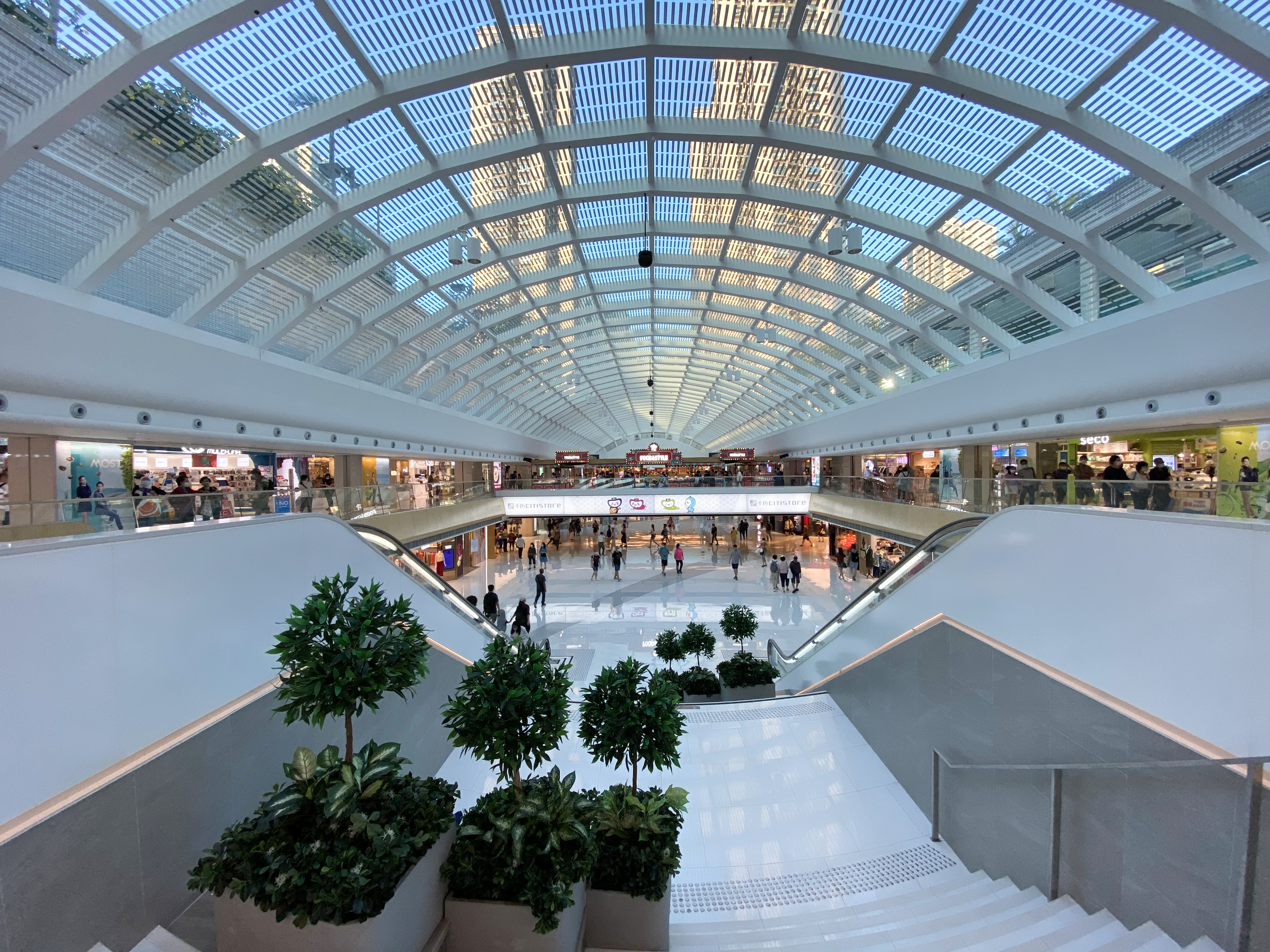
- Atrium of MOSTown
- Traditional Chinese: 新港城中心
- Simplified Chinese: 新港城中心
- Literal meaning: new harbour city centre
Transcriptions
Yue: Cantonese
- Jyutping: san1 gong2 sing4

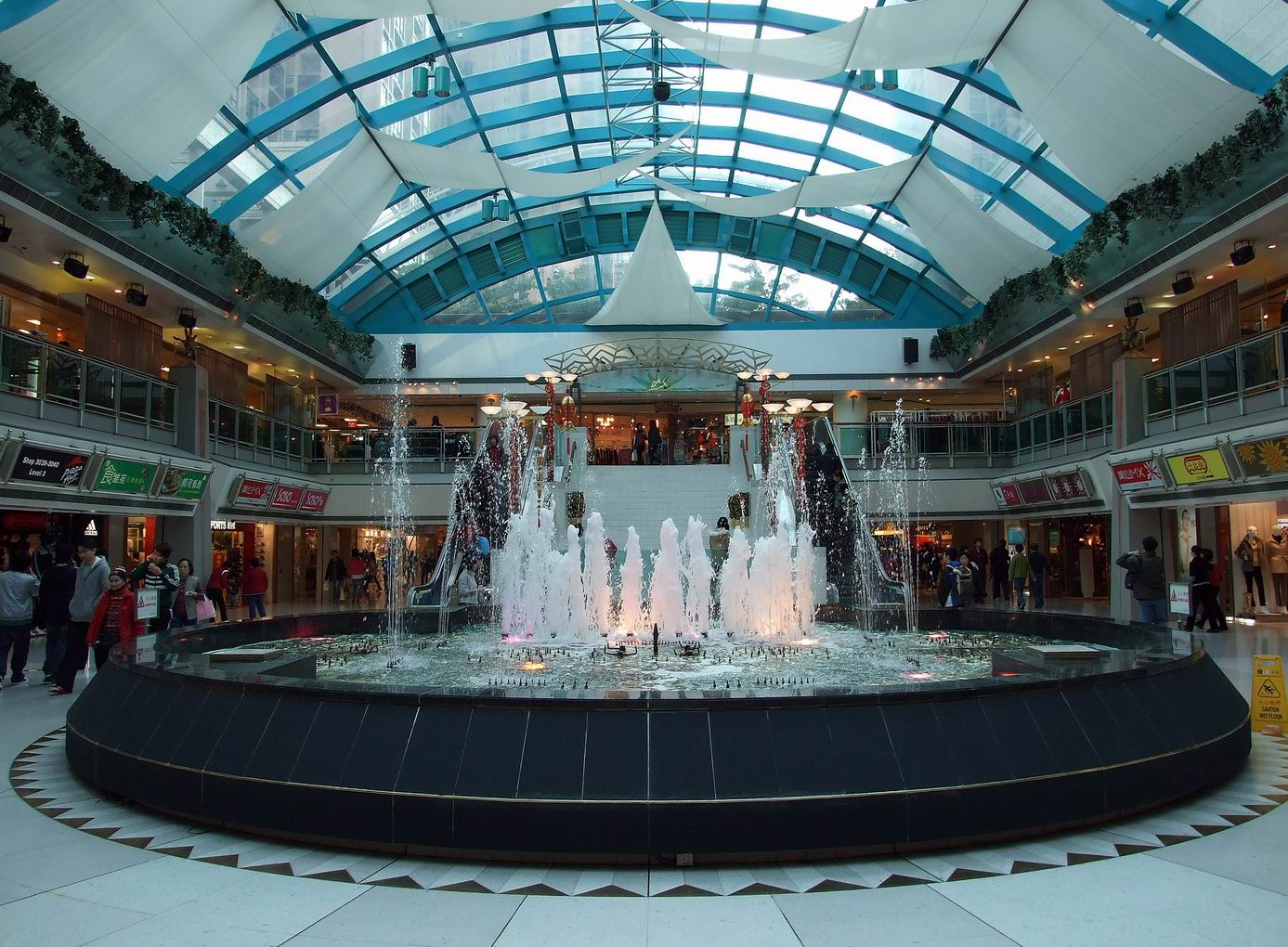
Former musical fountain of Sunshine City Plaza, disassembled in 2017.

MOSTown (formerly Sunshine City Plaza; Chinese: 新港城中心) is a shopping centre in the town centre of Ma On Shan in the Sha Tin District of Hong Kong. It was developed by Henderson Land Development, as part of the Sunshine City residential and commercial development, constructed in five phases during the 1990s.

== Shopping centre ==
MOSTown is the shopping mall of phases 4 and 5, formerly named respectively Sunshine City Plaza (新港城中心) and Sunshine Bazaar (新港城廣場) until August 2018. The shopping arcade built with phase 4, formerly Sunshine City Plaza, is by far the largest, and has retail floor space of in excess of 175,000 square metres (1,880,000 sq ft). The shopping centres for phases 1 to 3 are relatively small, and are collectively named MOSTown Street.

== Residential towers ==
There are residential towers above MOSTown, containing in excess of 4,700 residential units. The majority of units are between 40 and 60 square metres. Each phase was built together with a shopping arcade. Phase 5 is also known as Tolo Place (海濤居).

== Location and access ==
MOSTown is located on Sai Sha Road, adjacent to the MTR Ma On Shan station, has nowadays become the centre of Ma On Shan. It is across from the Ma On Shan Plaza.

Ma On Shan Town Centre bus terminus is located underneath MOSTown. Ma On Shan station of the MTR Tuen Ma line was opened in 2004, and is connected to MOSTown by a footbridge. The resulting improvement in transport has been an important factor for the increase in the number of visitors to Sunshine City Plaza (its name at that time).

== Transportation ==
Ma On Shan station Exit B is connected to MOSTown, below which a bus terminus is located.

== See also ==
- New Town Plaza - A major shopping centre in Sha Tin District.
