= Ma On Shan line =

Hong Kong railway line (2004–2020)

Ma On Shan line 馬鞍山綫
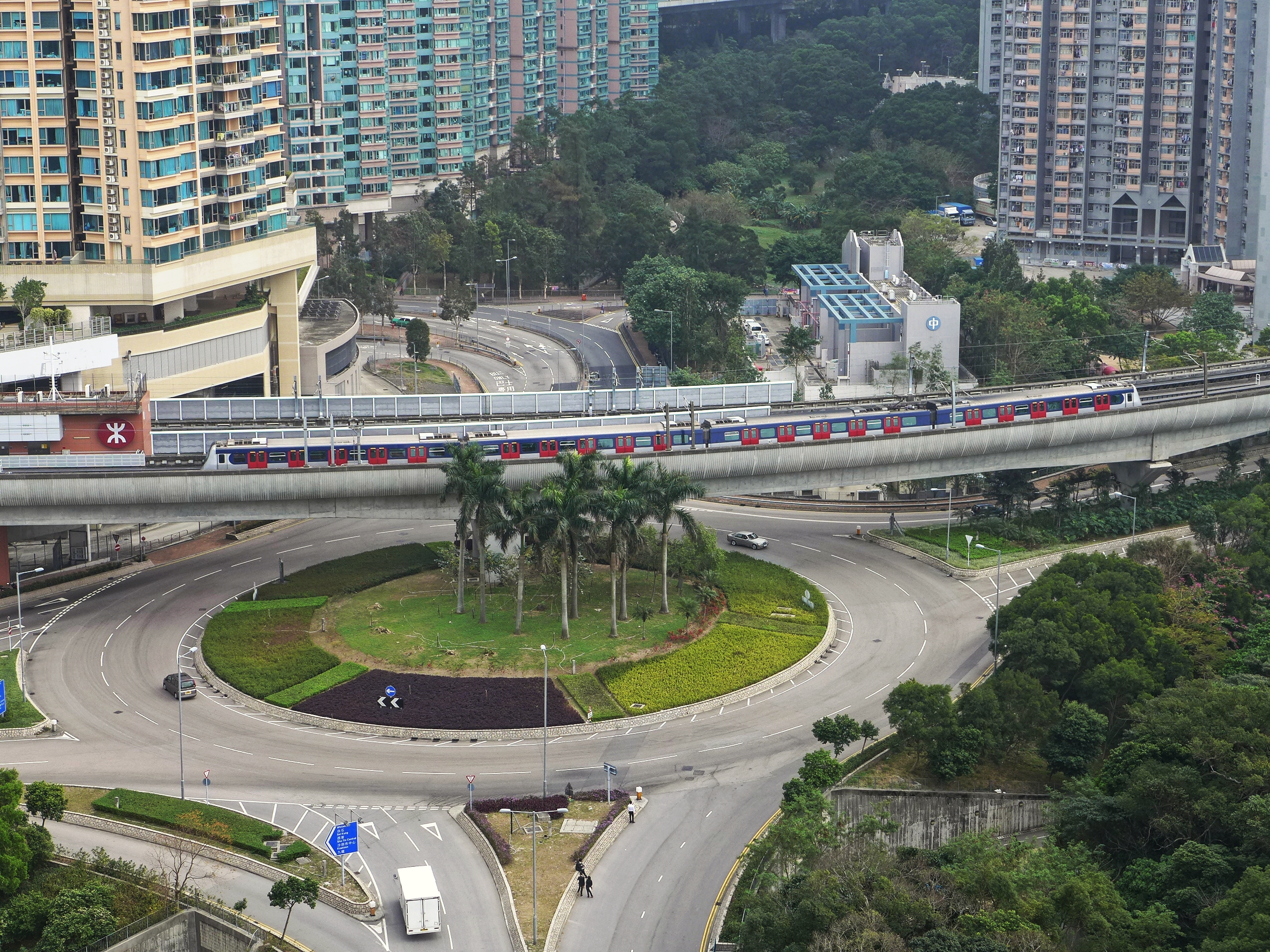
- Kinki Sharyo SP1900 EMU running on viaduct near Wu Kai Sha

Overview
- Locale: Sha Tin District
- Termini: Kai Tak; Wu Kai Sha
- Continues as: Tuen Ma line
- Former connections: East Rail line
- Stations: 12
- Color on map: Brown (#923011)

Service
- Type: Commuter rail / Rapid transit
- System: MTR
- Depot: Tai Wai
- Rolling stock: SP1900/1950 EMU; CRRC Changchun C1141A EMU
- Ridership: 153,100 weekday average (Sept to Oct 2014)

History
- Opened: 21 December 2004
- Closed: 14 February 2020 (became part of the Tuen Ma line Phase 1)

Technical
- Line length: 11.4 km (7.1 mi)
- Track gauge: 1,435 mm (4 ft 8 1/2 in)
- Electrification: 25 kV AC 50 Hz (Overhead lines)
Route map

Ma On Shan line
- Traditional Chinese: 馬鞍山綫
- Simplified Chinese: 马鞍山线
Transcriptions
Standard Mandarin
- Hanyu Pinyin: ma3 an1 shan1 xian4
Yue: Cantonese
- Yale Romanization: máh ōn sāan sin
- Jyutping: ma5 on1 saan1 sin3

The Ma On Shan line (Chinese: 馬鞍山綫) (formerly known as Ma On Shan Rail from 21 December 2004 to 2 December 2007 and Tuen Ma line Phase 1 from 14 February 2020 onwards) was a commuter rail / rapid transit line that formed part of the Mass Transit Railway (MTR) system in Hong Kong. Coloured brown on the MTR map, the line acted as a branch of the East Rail line that connected the new towns of Sha Tin and Ma On Shan in the northeastern New Territories.

The railway was one of three built by the Kowloon-Canton Railway Corporation (KCRC), which named it as Ma On Shan Rail (Chinese: 馬鞍山鐵路, abbreviated as 馬鐵). Since KCRC's merger of operations with the MTR Corporation on 2 December 2007, the line has been operated as part of the MTR network. Along with the West Rail line, the line was integrated into Tuen Ma line Phase 1 on 14 February 2020 following the partial opening of the Sha Tin to Central Link.

This was the only line without platform screen doors, opposed to the West Rail line, until the line was extended to Kai Tak station which had platform screen doors.

== Overview and current status ==
Construction of the Ma On Shan line began on 12 February 2001 and it fully opened for service on 21 December 2004, 3 days earlier than the proposed opening date. KCRC estimated the construction costs to be HK$10 billion. Over a thousand passengers took the first train from Tai Wai on the first day of service. Since then, the usage of buses and taxis in the area decreased by as much as 50%. It was reported that some bus routes operated by KMB saw a decrease of ridership by one-third in just a few days.

Since the early planning stages, the Ma On Shan line was designed to be capable of joining with the West Rail line. Under Phase 1 the Sha Tin to Central Link project, the Ma On Shan line would be extended from Tai Wai station to Hung Hom station via East Kowloon, with six new intermediate stations, including interchanges with the Kwun Tong line at Diamond Hill and Ho Man Tin, an additional interchange with the East Rail line at Hung Hom, and a new station, Hin Keng, serving Sha Tin. The extension will connect to the West Rail line at Hung Hom and continue on to Tuen Mun station in the northwest New Territories via the current West Rail line and its 2009 extension to Hung Hom). Due to various delays, the new line opened only as far as Kai Tak on 14 February 2020, with the remaining section to Hung Hom beginning service on 27 June 2021.

After the opening of the Tuen Ma line Phase 1 on 14 February 2020, the Ma On Shan line became part of the new line with three new stations in Hin Keng, Diamond Hill and Kai Tak. While technically still in operation, the name "Ma On Shan line" is no longer in use.

Both the SP1900 and East West line C-trains in eight-car formations will run on the conjoined line, now known as the Tuen Ma line, resulting in the platforms of the Ma On Shan line being lengthened from 2014 to 2016 to accommodate the longer trains and automatic platform gates by Gilgen Door Systems (part of Nabtesco Corporation) retrofitted on all platforms from 2014 to 2017. The SelTrac IS signalling system will also be upgraded to SelTrac CBTC, which equips the extension.

== Stations ==
The following is a list of the stations on the Ma On Shan line.

Livery and Station Name		Connections	Opening date	District
English	Chinese	Connections	Opening date	District
Wu Kai Sha	烏溪沙		21 December 2004	Sha Tin
Ma On Shan	馬鞍山		21 December 2004	Sha Tin
Heng On	恆安		21 December 2004	Sha Tin
Tai Shui Hang	大水坑		21 December 2004	Sha Tin
Shek Mun	石門		21 December 2004	Sha Tin
City One	第一城		21 December 2004	Sha Tin
Sha Tin Wai	沙田圍		21 December 2004	Sha Tin
Che Kung Temple	車公廟		21 December 2004	Sha Tin
Tai Wai	大圍	East Rail line	21 December 2004	Sha Tin

== Gallery ==
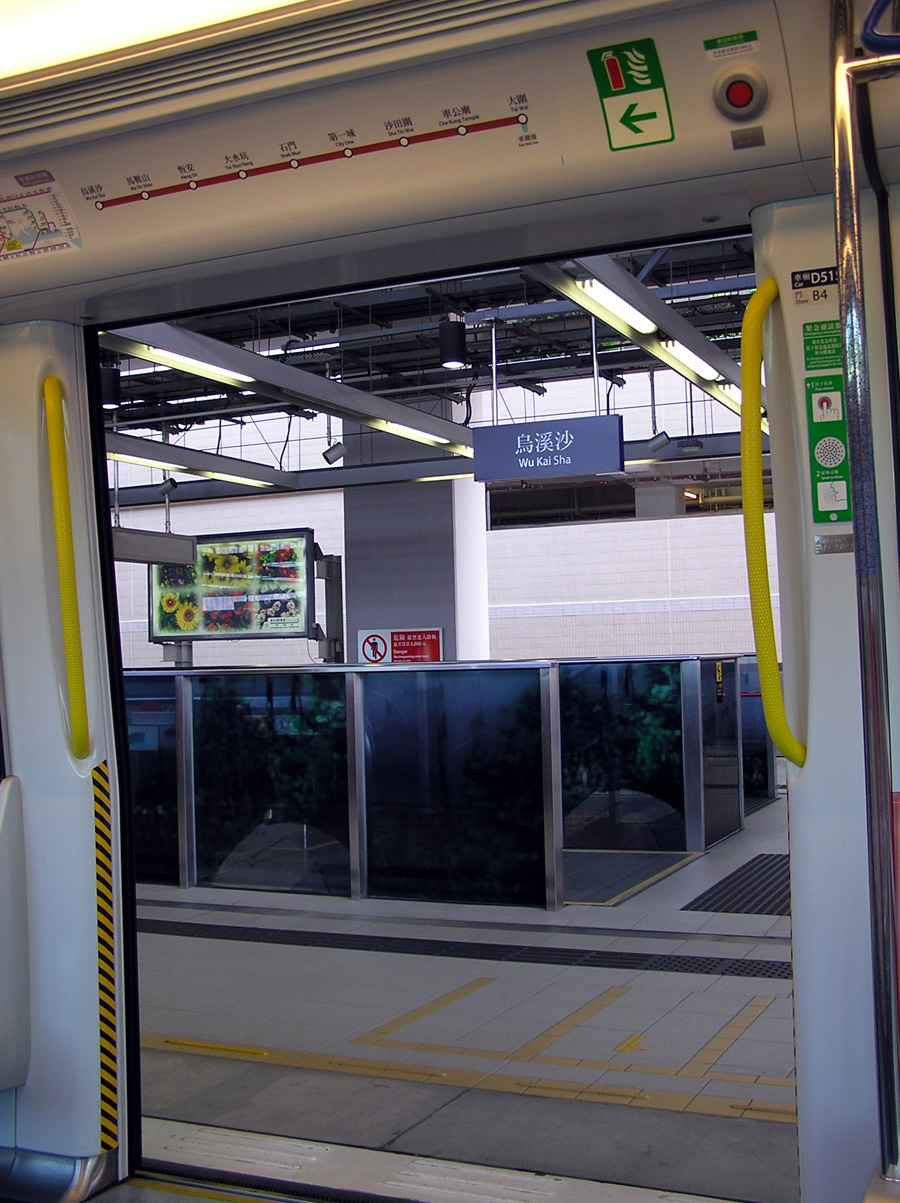
A Ma On Shan line train stopping at Wu Kai Sha station

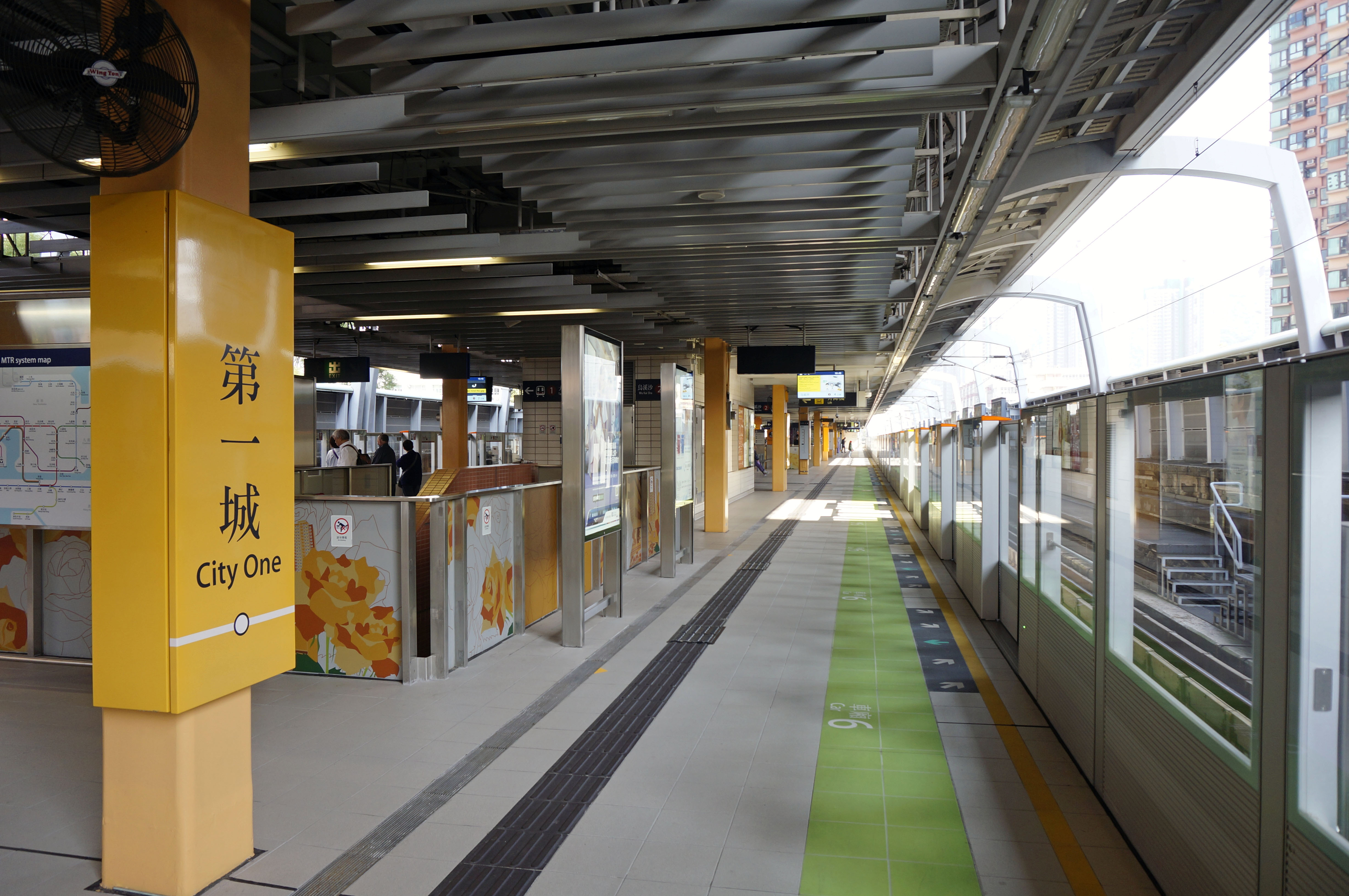
Platform 2 City One station.

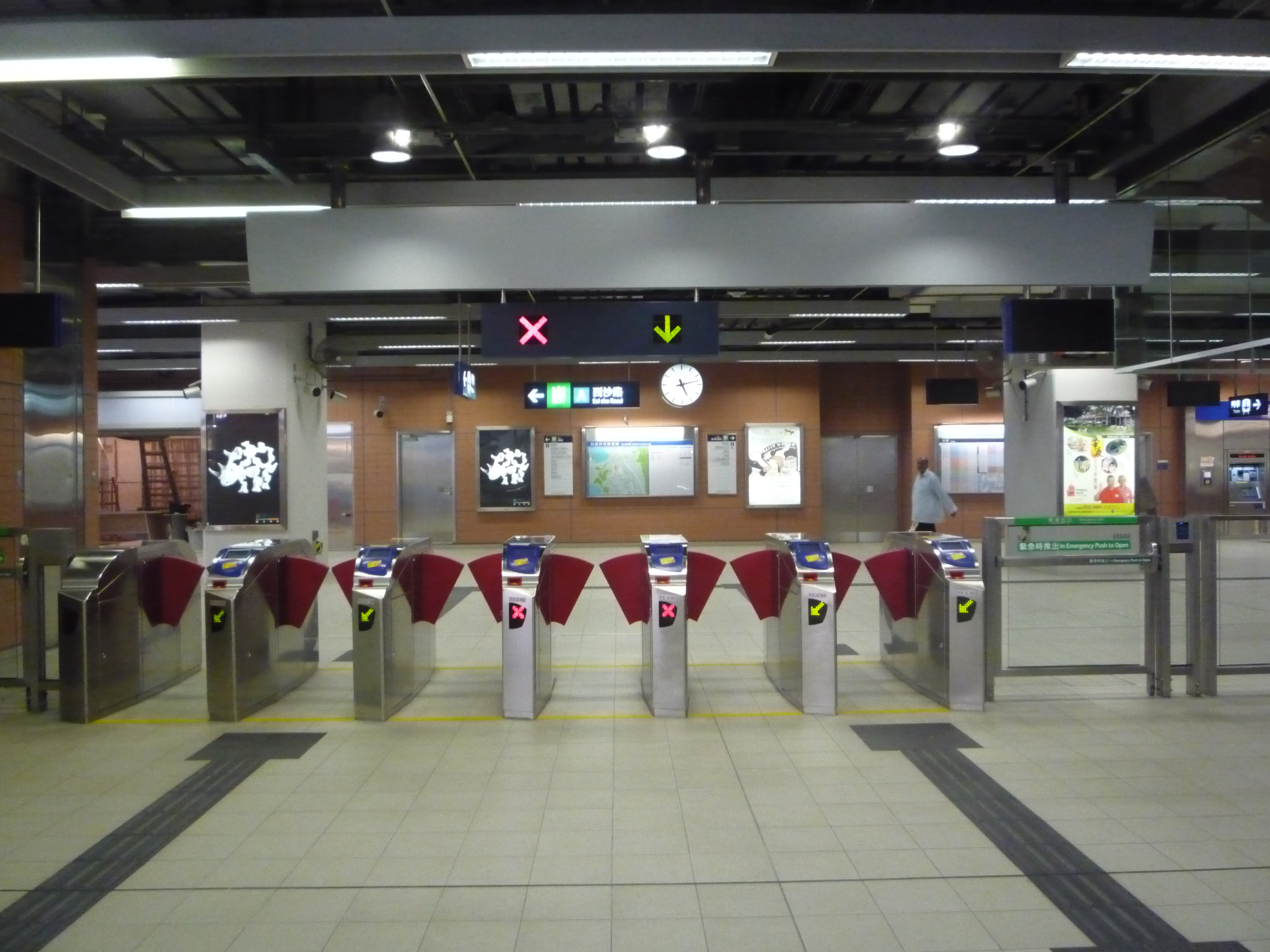
The concourse of the Wu Kai Sha station of the Ma On Shan line

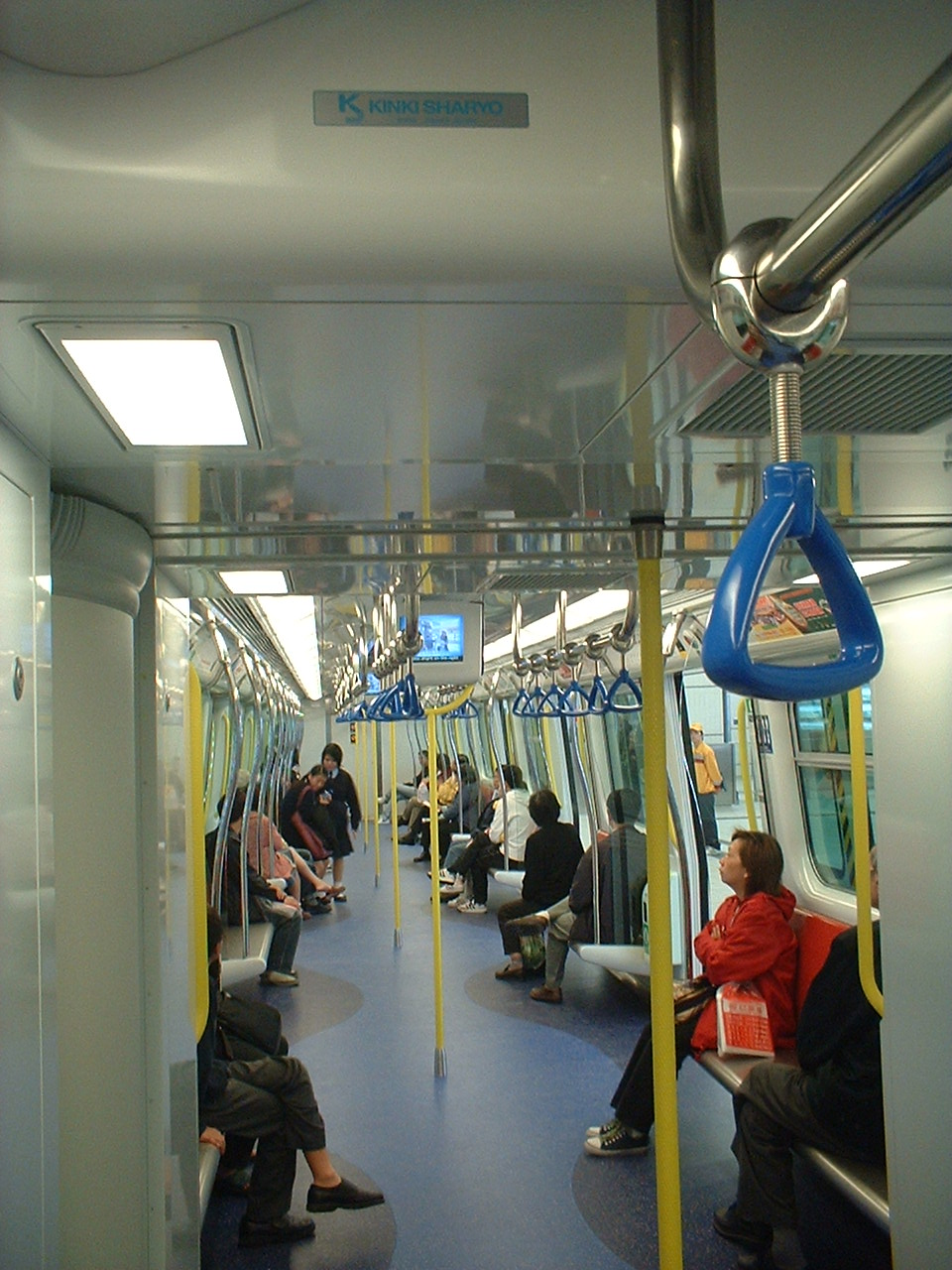
Interior of a passenger car of Ma On Shan line SP1950 train, built by Kinki Sharyo

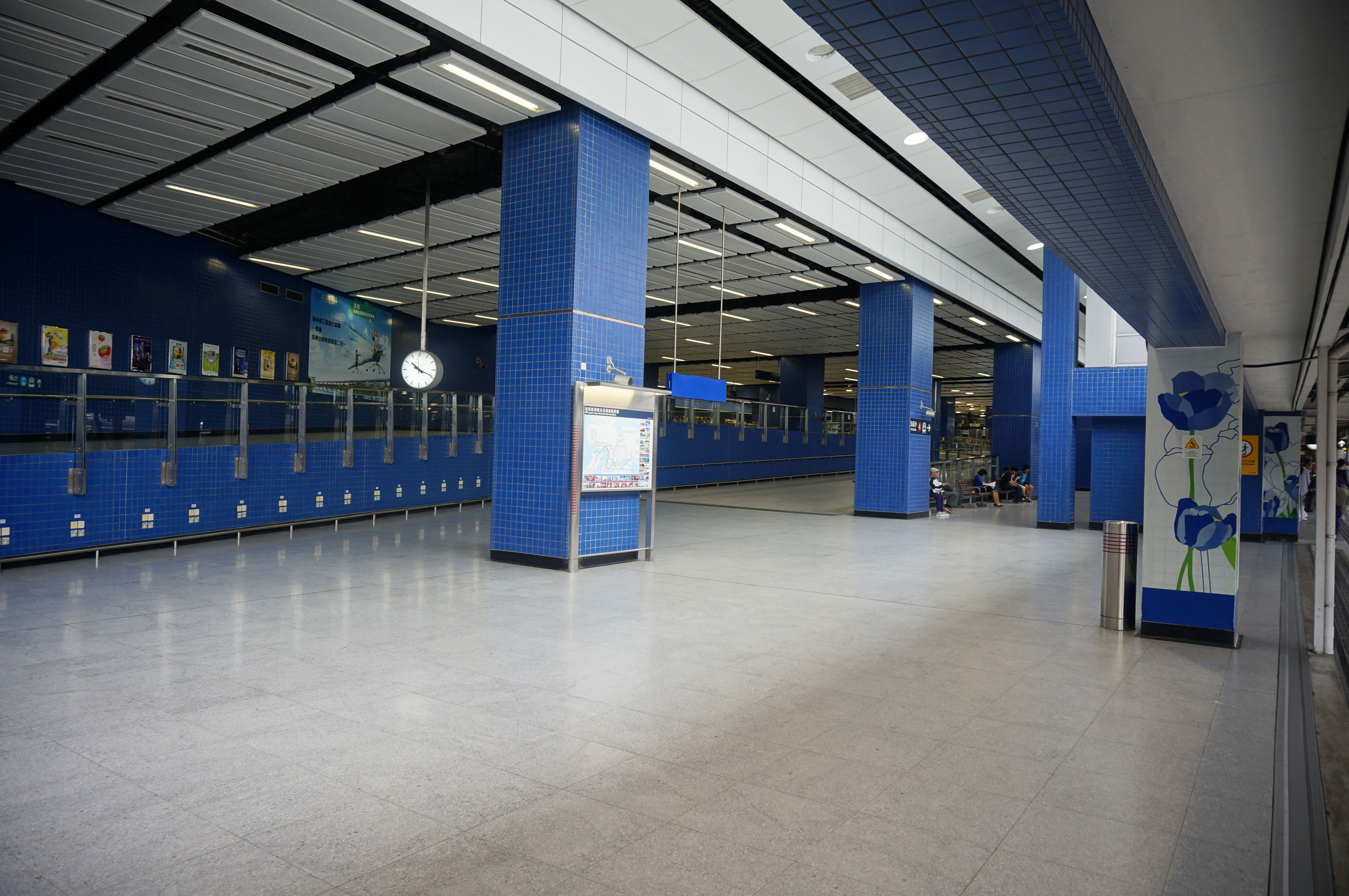
Walkway connecting Tai Wai station platforms 2 and 3

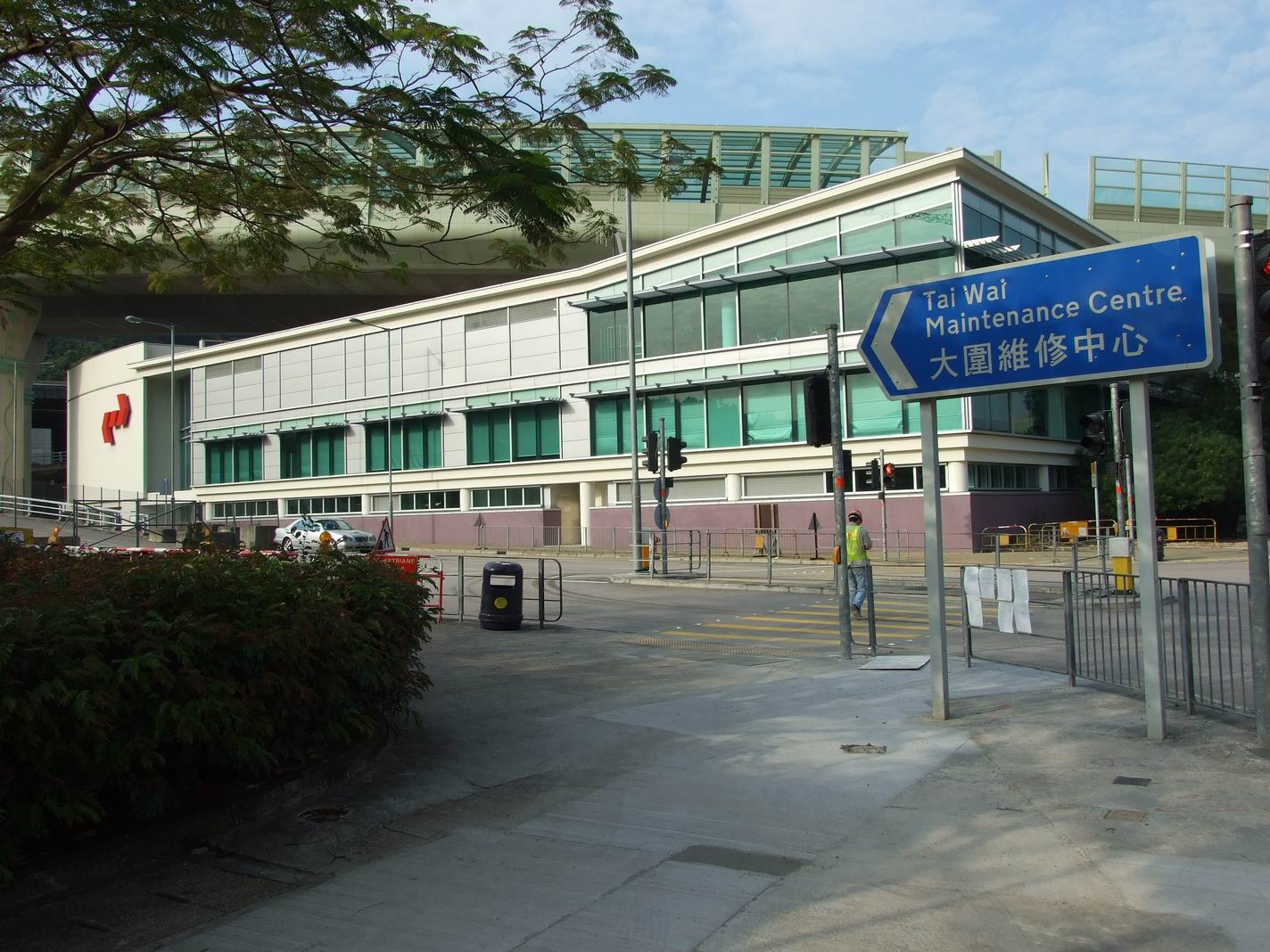
Tai Wai depot. Note the KCRC logo of pre-merger times

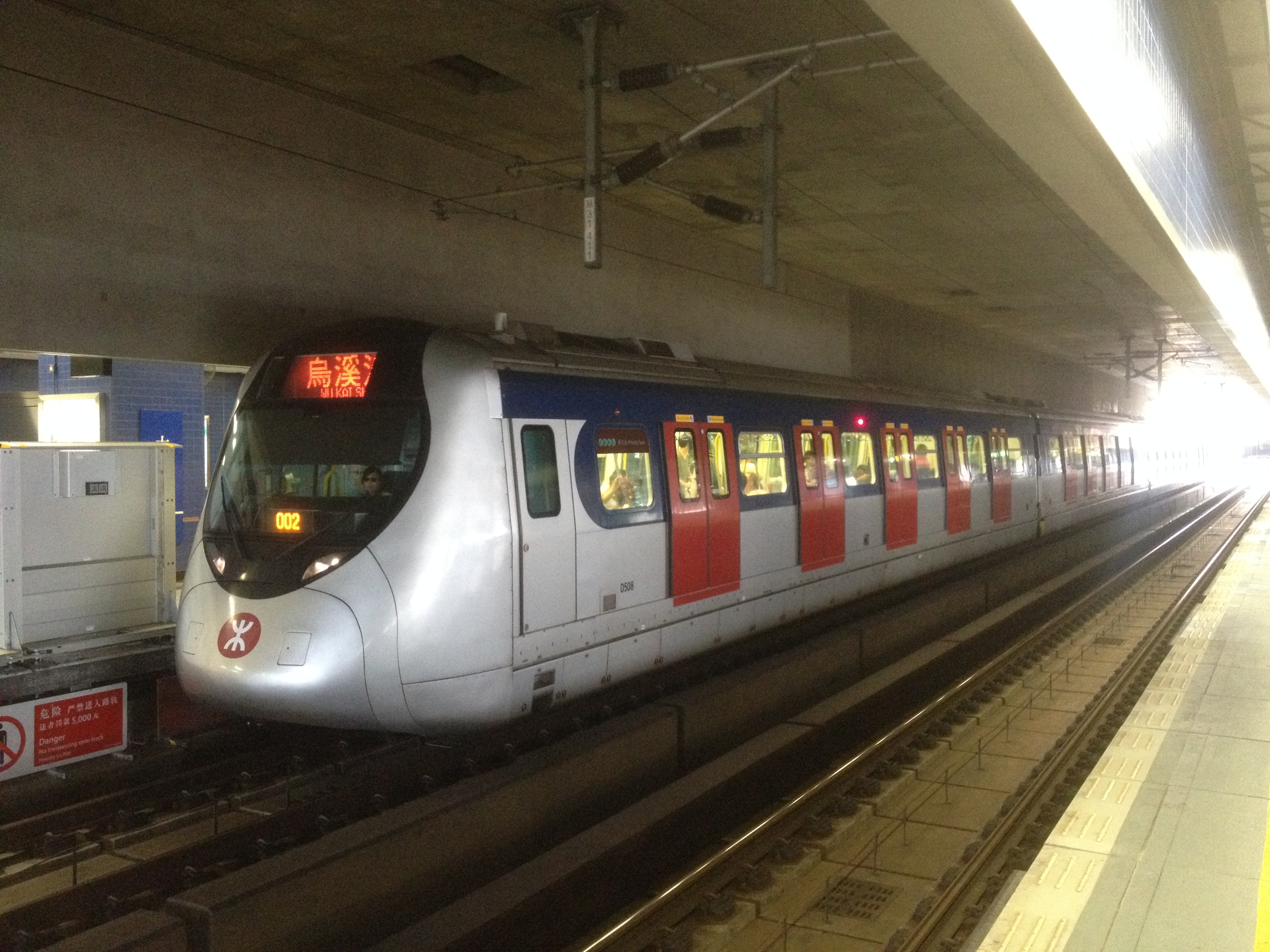
EMU stopped at Tai Wai station

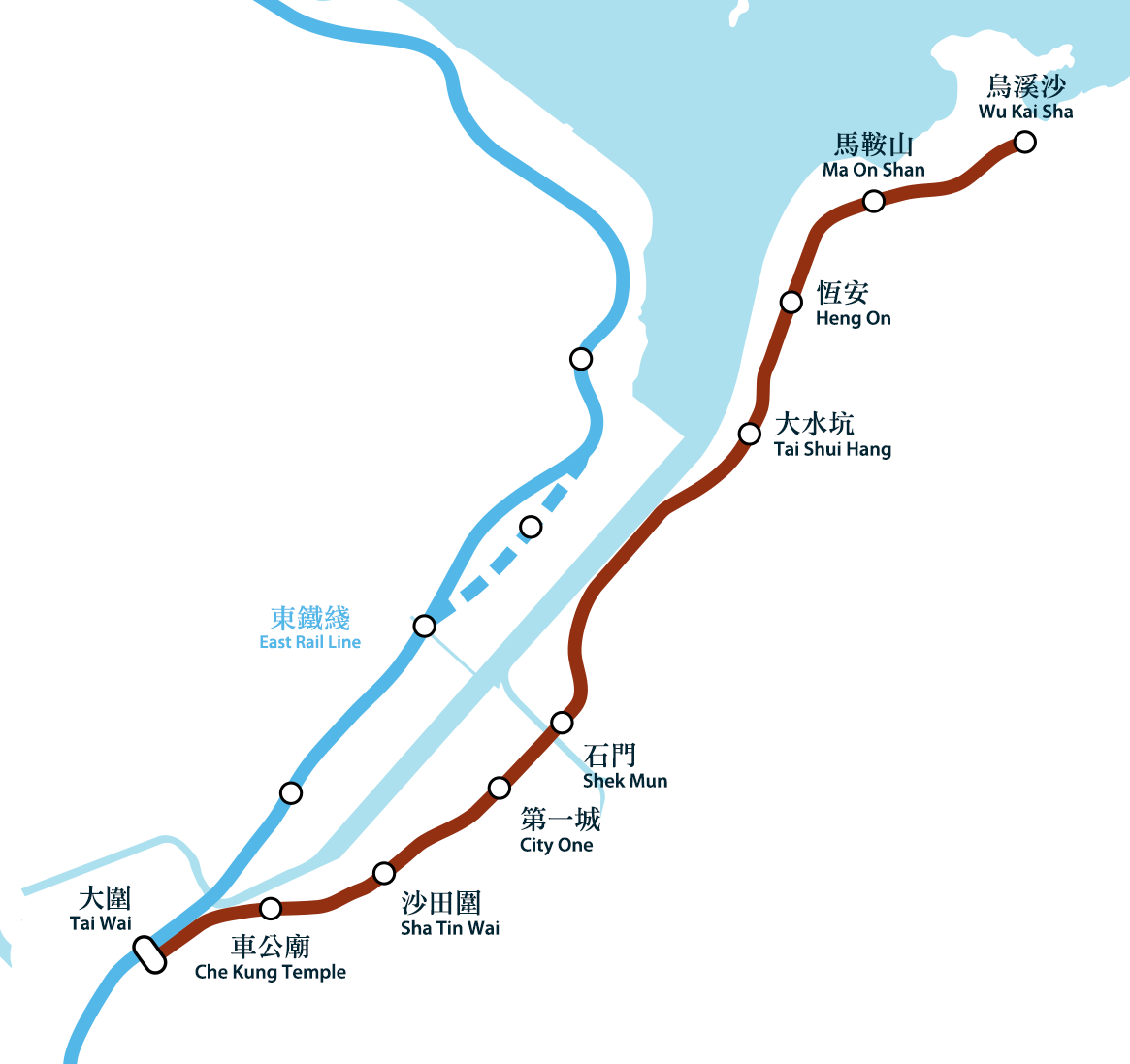
Geographically accurate route map showing the Ma On Shan line

== See also ==
- Ma On Shan (town)
