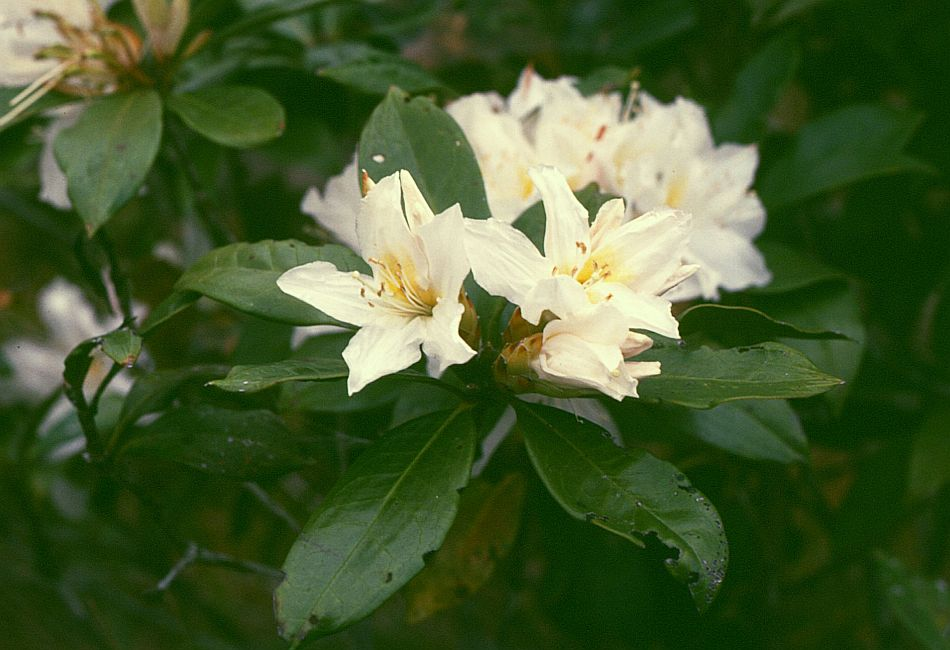

Scientific classification
- Kingdom: Plantae
- Clade: Tracheophytes
- Clade: Angiosperms
- Clade: Eudicots
- Clade: Asterids
- Order: Ericales
- Family: Ericaceae
- Genus: Rhododendron
- Species: R. moulmainense

Binomial name
- Rhododendron moulmainense Hook.f.

= Rhododendron moulmainense =

Species of plant

Rhododendron moulmainense, Westland's rhododendron, is a species of Rhododendron native to southern China (Fujian, Guangdong, Guangxi, Guizhou, Hong Kong, Hunan, Yunnan), Myanmar, Malaysia, Thailand, and Vietnam.

It is an evergreen shrub or small tree 3–8 m (9.8–26.2 ft) tall. The leaves are 4–13 cm long, elliptical and leathery. Every leaf has a curving margin rolling backward toward the underside. The flowers are fragrant, borne on top of the branches, in umbels and in groups of two to four. The petals are white or pink, with the inner parts spotted orange. The flowering period is from March to April. The fruit is a cylindrical, 2.5–5 cm long capsule, 6-angled along its length, bearing numerous small seeds. The fruiting period is from May to June.

The common name "Westland's rhododendron" honours A. B. Westland, the first Superintendent of the Botanic Gardens, Hong Kong.

In Hong Kong, where it occurs on Ma On Shan, Pat Sin Leng, Wu Kau Tang, and Lantau Island, it is a protected species under Forestry Regulations Cap. 96A.

This plant is widespread in its native habitat. However, in temperate climates it requires some protection, as it does not tolerate freezing temperatures.
