= Ma On Shan Plaza =

Shopping centre in Ma On Shan, Hong Kong

Coordinates: 22.42535°N 114.23106°E

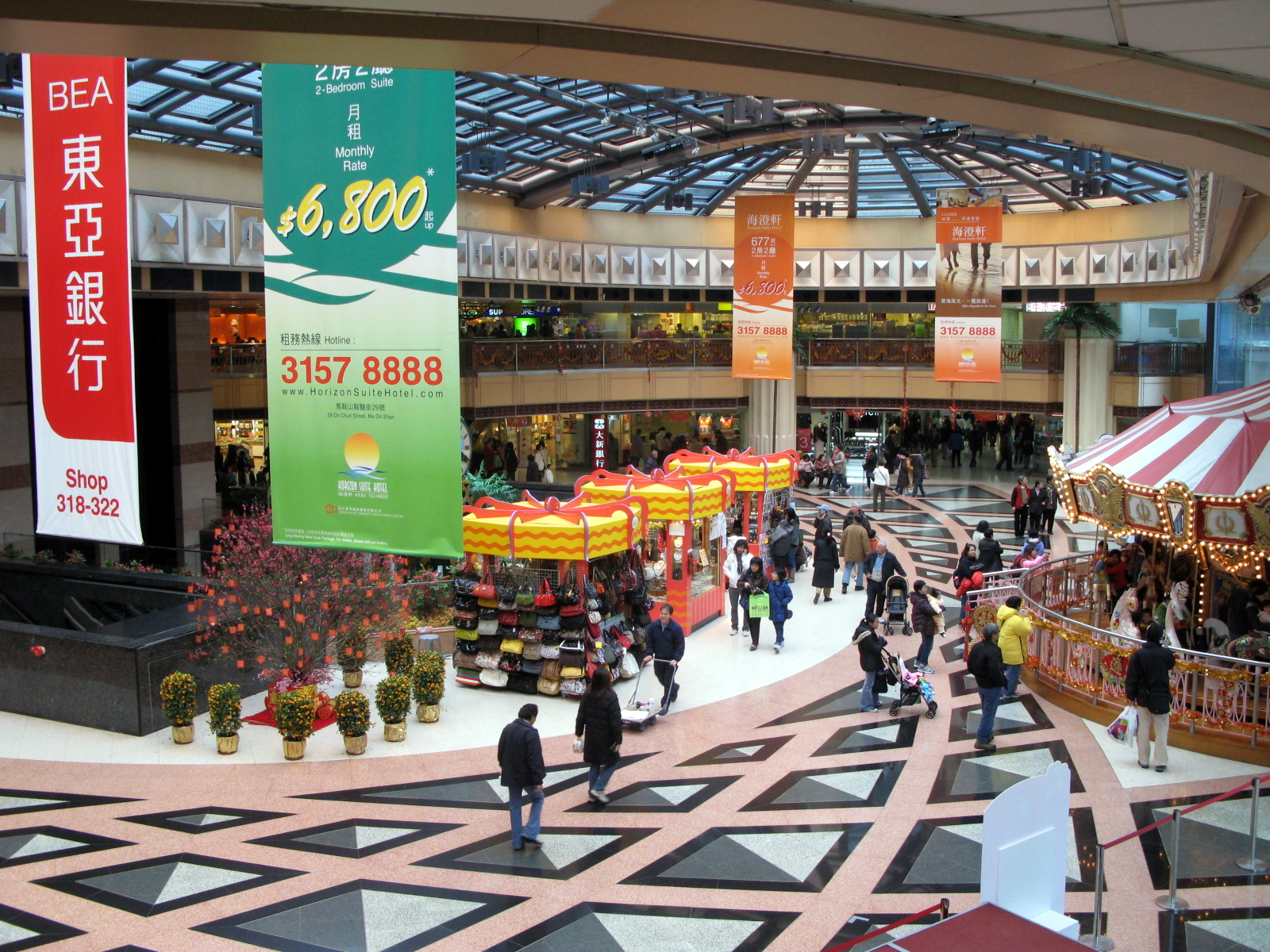
- Traditional Chinese: 馬鞍山廣場
- Simplified Chinese: 马鞍山广场
Transcriptions
Standard Mandarin
- Hanyu Pinyin: Mǎ'ānshān Guángchǎng
Yue: Cantonese
- Jyutping: maa5 on1 saan1 gwong2 coeng4

Ma On Shan Plaza is a shopping centre in the town centre of Ma On Shan in the Sha Tin District of Hong Kong.

== Location ==
Ma On Shan Plaza is located on Sai Sha Road, and is connected to MOSTown and the Ma On Shan station of the MTR Tuen Ma line by footbridges. It is an associated shopping centre built together with the residential estate of Bayshore Towers (海栢花園), developed by Cheung Kong Holdings.

== Features ==
The shopping centre has been noted for its indoor merry-go-round for the amusement of visitors who purchase items in any shops in the shopping arcade up to a certain amount. The merry-go-round, together with the water-operated clock tower next to it, has been the symbol of the Ma On Shan Plaza. There are a few places for children to play, for example Jumping Gym where visitors can play on game machines.

== See also ==
- Sunshine City
