= Mosses (disambiguation) =

Mosses are non-vascular flowerless plants that form the division Bryophyta.

Mosses may also refer to:

== Places ==
- Mosses, Alabama, a town in the United States
- Col des Mosses, a mountain pass in Switzerland

== People ==
- Peter Mosses, a British computer scientist
- William Mosses, a British trade unionist

== See also ==
- Moss (disambiguation)
- Moses (disambiguation)
