= MDOS =

MDOS may refer to:

- Micropolis MDOS, an operating system for Intel 8080 machines
- Motorola Disk Operating System for the M6800 based EXORciser development system in the 1970s
- Motorola Disk Operating System, also the underlying basis of the QDOS operating system of the Fairlight CMI digital sampling synthesizer series
- MIDAS (operating system) (originally named MDOS, and also known as M-DOS or My DOS), an 8-bit operating system for 8080/Z80, developed by Microsoft's Marc McDonald in 1979
- Myarc Disk Operating System (a.k.a. MDOS), an operating system emulating the TI-99/4A for the Geneve 9640 in 1987
- MS-DOS 4.0 (multitasking), a multitasking operating system
- Multitasking DOS sub-system in IBM OS/2, e.g. C:\OS2\MDOS\
- Multiuser DOS (a.k.a. DR MDOS), a DOS- and CP/M compatible 32-bit protected mode operating system for 386 machines developed by Digital Research / Novell in the 1990s
- Multiuser DOS Federation, an industry alliance in the 1990s
- MDOS/MDOS2 systems used the Didaktik 40 and 80 disk units

== See also ==
- DOS (disambiguation)
- MOS (disambiguation)
- Wordmark Systems MyDOS, an operating system for 8-bit Atari homecomputers by Wordmark Systems in the 1980s
