= Howard Moss (songwriter) =

British born songwriter (born 1975)

- Born: 1 March 1975 (age 51)
- Origin: Luton, Bedfordshire, England
- Genres: Rock
- Occupations: Singer, songwriter
- Years active: 1994–present
- Website: howardmoss.webs.com

Howard Moss (born 1 March 1975) is a British born songwriter. Howard moved to Ireland with his parents at the age of five and attended School at St. Michael's Diocesan School in Trim, County Meath, Ireland. He started playing the guitar at the age of 13 and performed in his first school band, Near Dark, at the age of 14.

In 1991, Moss moved to Dublin and began concentrating on writing his own songs. In 1994 he released a four-track EP entitled Sally Forth which was recorded at Pulse Studios Dublin. It was released under the TEL record label, an independent Company based in Meath. The E.P. peaked at position #18 in the Irish Charts. In 1995 Moss released his first album, Tempus Fugit, again under the TEL Label. The album was well received by the radio and the press and was put on regular rotation on most FM Radio Stations around Ireland. From this album came the first single, "Delilah", which, with the aid of a full music video, received numerous plays on MTV Europe reached position #11 in the Irish charts and stayed in the top 20 for five weeks.

Moss has also performed in Tribute Acts, Hotel California - Tribute to the Eagles, and founded the Irish tribute act, Born To Run - the Tribute to Bruce Springsteen which played numerous times at the Olympia Theatre (Dublin). Moss also performs with his own band, Stoneloader.

The album, Outside The Pale, was released in September 2013 He has performed live on radio, notably an acoustic version of the new single "Need To Know Now" on the Mark Punter Afternoon Show at BBC Essex, as well as performances on local radio including the Daire Nelson show on LMFM North East Radio Ireland.

The most recent release by Moss is the February 2014 album Keep Your Enemies Close.

== Discography ==
- 1994 - Sally Forth
1. Crazy World
2. Bliss
3. Wrecking Boats
4. Catch 22
- 1995 - Tempus Fugit
1. No Imagination
2. Delilah
3. Wrecking Boats
4. Child Of Our Time
5. Just Call My Name
6. Bliss
7. Catch 22
8. Pray
9. Early Morning Window
10. Crazy World
11. Was He Waiting There?
12. Dawn
- 2013 - Outside The Pale
1. Outside The Pale 04:16
2. Fill Tomorrow 04:07
3. Moving On 03:34
4. Need To Know Now 04:53
5. Subtle Kind Of Grey 04:19
6. All Hopes Gone 04:42
7. Waiting For The Girl 04:04
8. One Step At A Time 03:54
9. Unfinished Dream 04:41
10. Hallowed Ground 04:09
11. Too Tired To Fight 03:56
12. Step Out Of The Void 06:37
13. Need To Know Now (Acoustic) 04:38
- 2014 - Keep Your Enemies Close
1. The Winning Hand 03:19
2. Graveyard Poetry 03:31
3. Spell Of The Moon 02:41
4. Keep Your Enemies Close 04:32
5. Lost Elements 01:18
6. Lost In Time 03:05
7. Tuesday Morning 03:50
8. No Words Said 03:47
9. Running On Empty 04:01
10. Hey Mr DJ 03:22
11. I'm Through With You 04:01
12. A Little Bit Crazy 04:18
13. Need To Be Strong 03:24
