= Moss, West Virginia =

- Unincorporated community
- Location within West Virginia Location within the United States
- Coordinates: 38°52′15″N 80°48′17″W
- Country: United States
- State: West Virginia
- County: Gilmer
- Elevation: 896 ft (273 m)
- Time zone: UTC-5 (Eastern (EST))
  - Summer (DST): UTC-4 (EDT)
- GNIS feature ID: 1549835

Moss was an unincorporated community in Gilmer County, West Virginia, United States. Its post office is closed. It was also known as Murrell.

A large share of the first settlers were from the Moss family, hence the name.
