= Mary Moss =

American author and literary critic

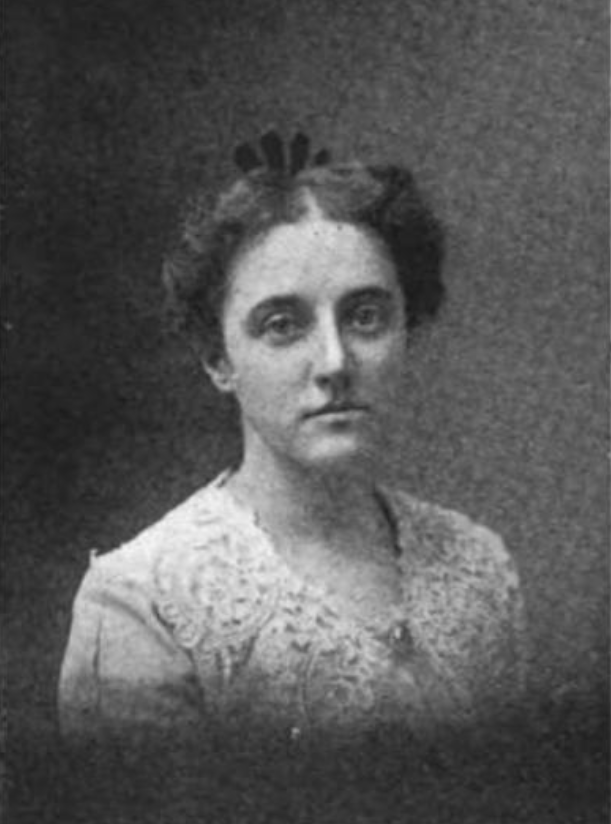
- Photograph of Mary Moss, c. 1903
- Born: September 24, 1864; Chestnut Hill, Philadelphia, Pennsylvania
- Died: April 2, 1914 (aged 49); Catania, Sicily, Italy
- Resting place: Sicily, Italy
- Writing career
- Notable works: Fruit Out of Season (1902); A Sequence in Hearts (1903); Julian Meldola (1903)

Mary Moss (September 24, 1864 – April 2, 1914) was an American author and literary critic.

== Biography ==
Mary Moss was born in Philadelphia to Dr. William Moss and Mary Noronha. She was a member an old and prominent Philadelphia Jewish family. Her great-grandfather was businessman Hyman Levy, in whose fur store John Jacob Astor was an apprentice. During the American Civil War, her father served as a private soldier in the 16st Pennsylvania Volunteers and as a surgeon in the 6th Pennsylvania Cavalry Regiment. She was educated at a private school in Chestnut Hill.

In 1900 Moss began writing for the Philadelphia Times and the Philadelphia Press, to which she contributed sketches on the Yiddish theater and other subjects. From 1902 she was a prolific contributor of fiction and essays to various magazines. Her Jewish novel Julian Meldohla appeared in Lippincott's Magazine in 1903. Besides two other novels, Fruit Out of Season (1902) and A Sequence in Hearts (1903), she contributed short stories and essays to the Atlantic Monthly, McClure's Magazine, The Bookman, Ainslee's Magazine, and Scribner's Magazine.

On her success as an author, Moss said of herself:

"Facts about me are terribly meagre. If I had to live over again and knew this 'fame' was to be thrust upon me I'd mis-spend every Saturday afternoon, so as to have a dark past to draw on. As it is, I've alwavs lived here and never experienced anything in the least noteworthy. I've always had a great curiosity about people in general, and very little about people in particular, the neighbours for instance. Always, without knowing why, I simply had to explore different kinds of people, had to understand how they felt about things, how they lived. It was imperative, though I did not realise why, or feel conscious of any definite aim."

She died at the Rindone Hospital in Catania, Sicily, several weeks after falling suddenly ill with a brain tumor.

== Selected publications ==
- "Why We Read Samuel Richardson". Lippincott's Magazine. 69 (4): 489–491. April 1902.
- "Fruit Out of Season". Lippincott's Monthly Magazine. 70 (418): 385–436. October 1902.
- "Julian Meldohla". Lippincott's Monthly Magazine. 71 (423): 289–350. March 1903.
- "The Evolution of the Trained Nurse". Atlantic Monthly. 91: 587–599. May 1903.
- "Miss Atherton's Wanderjahr". Lippincott's Monthly Magazine. 72 (429): 353–360. September 1903.
- "A Pompadour Angel". McClure's. 21 (5): 490–498. September 1903. Illustrated by May Wilson Preston.
- A Sequence in Hearts. Philadelphia: J. B. Lippincott Co. 1903.
- "An Augur in Kimono". Ainslee's Magazine. 13 (1): 99–102. February 1904.
- "The Kangaroos". Scribner's Magazine. 35 (2): 181–188. February 1904. Illustrated by Karl Anderson.
- "Judith Liebestraum". Scribner's Magazine. 36 (1): 46–47. July 1904.
- "Machine-Made Human Beings". Atlantic Monthly. 94: 264–268. August 1904.
- "Marooned". Lippincott's Monthly Magazine. 74 (440): 244–250. August 1904.
- "In the City General". Everybody's Magazine. 11 (3): 348–353. September 1904. Illustrated by Charlotte Weber.
- "Routed at Brandywine". The Reader Magazine. 5 (2): 157–165. January 1905.
- "Significant Tendencies in Current Fiction". Atlantic Monthly. 95: 689–700. May 1905.
- "A Plea for Bores". The Bookman. 21 (6): 641–644. August 1905.
- "Mr. Nickerson's Star". McClure's Magazine. 26 (6): 664–671. April 1906. Illustrated by May Wilson Preston.
- "Shore Leave". Lippincott's Magazine. 78 (2): 206–213. August 1906.
- "The Novels of Thomas Hardy". Atlantic Monthly. 98: 354–367. September 1906.
- "H. Otway Presents". Ainslee's Magazine. 18 (4): 109–117. November 1906.
- "The Jewel of Experience". The Smart Set. 20 (4): 142–147. December 1906.
- The Poet and the Parish. New York: Henry Holt & Co. 1906. hdl:2027/uc2.ark:/13960/t2b855785.
- "An Impression of the Fifties". Putnam's Monthly. 3 (4): 389–401. January 1908.
