= Moss (given name) =

Moss is a given name. Notable people with the name include:

- Moss Burmester (born 1981), New Zealand swimmer
- Moss Cass (1927–2022), Australian politician
- Moss Kent Dickinson (1822–1897), Canadian businessman and politician
- Moss Evans (1925–2002), British trade union leader
- Moss Hart (1904–1961), American playwright
- Moss Turner-Samuels (1888–1957), British politician
- Moss Twomey (1897–1978), Irish republican and IRA leader
