= Irish moss =

Irish moss may refer to:

- Chondrus crispus, a commonly gathered seaweed; a clarifying agent in beer brewing
- Mastocarpus stellatus, a less commonly gathered seaweed
- Sagina subulata, a terrestrial plant with needle-like leaves
- Soleirolia soleirolii, a terrestrial plant with round leaves
- Arenaria verna, a terrestrial plant in the genus Arenaria
- Gracilaria, a genus of seaweed
- Irish moss (drink), a beverage in Jamaican cuisine made from Gracilaria
- Gelidium amansii, a genus of seaweed which yields agar agar
