= Ma On Shan station =

MTR station in the New Territories, Hong Kong

Ma On Shan 馬鞍山
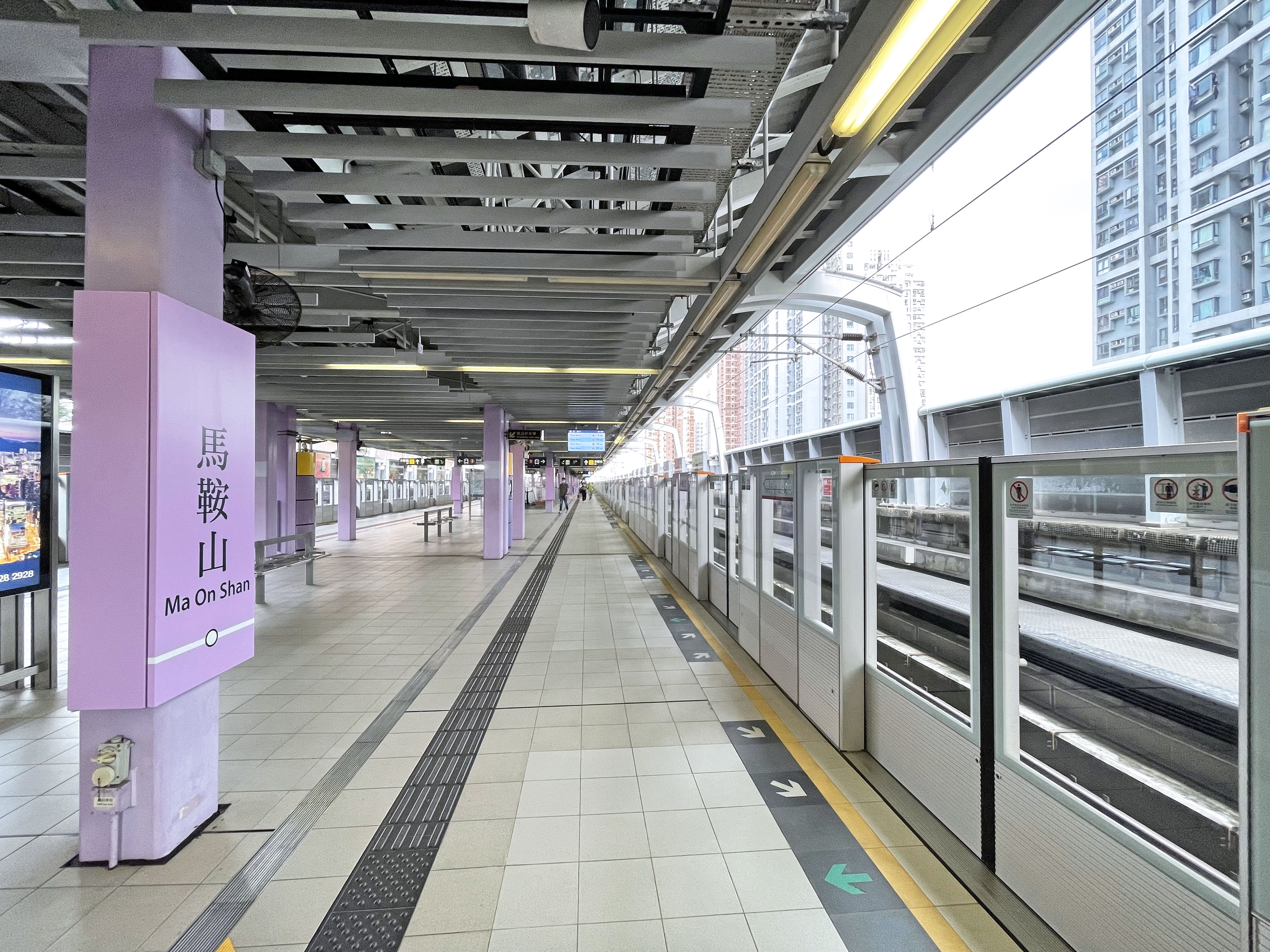
- Platform 1

Chinese name
- Traditional Chinese: 馬鞍山
- Simplified Chinese: 马鞍山
- Cantonese Yale: Máh'ōnsāan
- Literal meaning: Horse saddle hill/ mountain
Transcriptions
Standard Mandarin
- Hanyu Pinyin: Mǎ'ānshān
Yue: Cantonese
- Yale Romanization: Máh'ōnsāan

General information
- Location: between Sunshine City and Bayshore Towers, Sai Sha Road; Sha Tin District, Hong Kong
- Coordinates: 22°25′29″N 114°13′54″E
- System: MTR rapid transit station
- Owner: KCR Corporation
- Operator: MTR Corporation
- Line: Tuen Ma line
- Platforms: 2 (1 island platform)
- Tracks: 2
- Connections: Bus, minibus

Construction
- Structure type: Elevated
- Accessible: yes

Other information
- Station code: MOS

History
- Opened: 21 December 2004; 21 years ago

Services
Preceding station	MTR	Following station
Heng On towards Tuen Mun	Tuen Ma line	Wu Kai Sha Terminus
Track layout
Location
- Location within MTR

Ma On Shan (Chinese: 馬鞍山) is an elevated station on the Tuen Ma line of Hong Kong. It is located above Sai Sha Road, at the town centre of Ma On Shan, between Sunshine City and Bayshore Towers. It also serves other residential areas like Kam Ying Court and Chung On Estate; it also serves over ten schools, and is in close proximity with Ma On Shan Park and other parks.

The pattern featured on the platform pillar and glass barrier symbolizes the abandoned iron mine that used to be in Ma On Shan peak.

== History ==
On 21 December 2004, Ma On Shan station opened with other KCR Ma On Shan Rail stations.

On 14 February 2020, Ma On Shan line was extended south to a new terminus in Kai Tak, as part of the first phase of the Shatin to Central Link Project. The Ma On Shan Line was renamed Tuen Ma line Phase 1 at the time. Ma On Shan station became an intermediate station on this temporary new line.

On 27 June 2021, Tuen Ma line Phase 1 subsequently merged with the West Rail line in East Kowloon to form the new Tuen Ma line, as part of the Shatin to Central link project. Hence, Ma On Shan was included in the project and is now an intermediate station on the Tuen Ma line, Hong Kong's longest railway line.

== Layout ==
P	Platform 1	← Tuen Ma line towards Tuen Mun (Heng On)
P	island platform
P	Platform 2	Tuen Ma line towards Wu Kai Sha (terminus) →
C	Concourse	exits, customer services, toilets, automatic teller machines, shops, Octopus promotion machine
G	Ground level	staff carpark (not open to public)

== Entrances/exits ==
- A1 & A2: Ma On Shan Plaza
- B: MOSTown
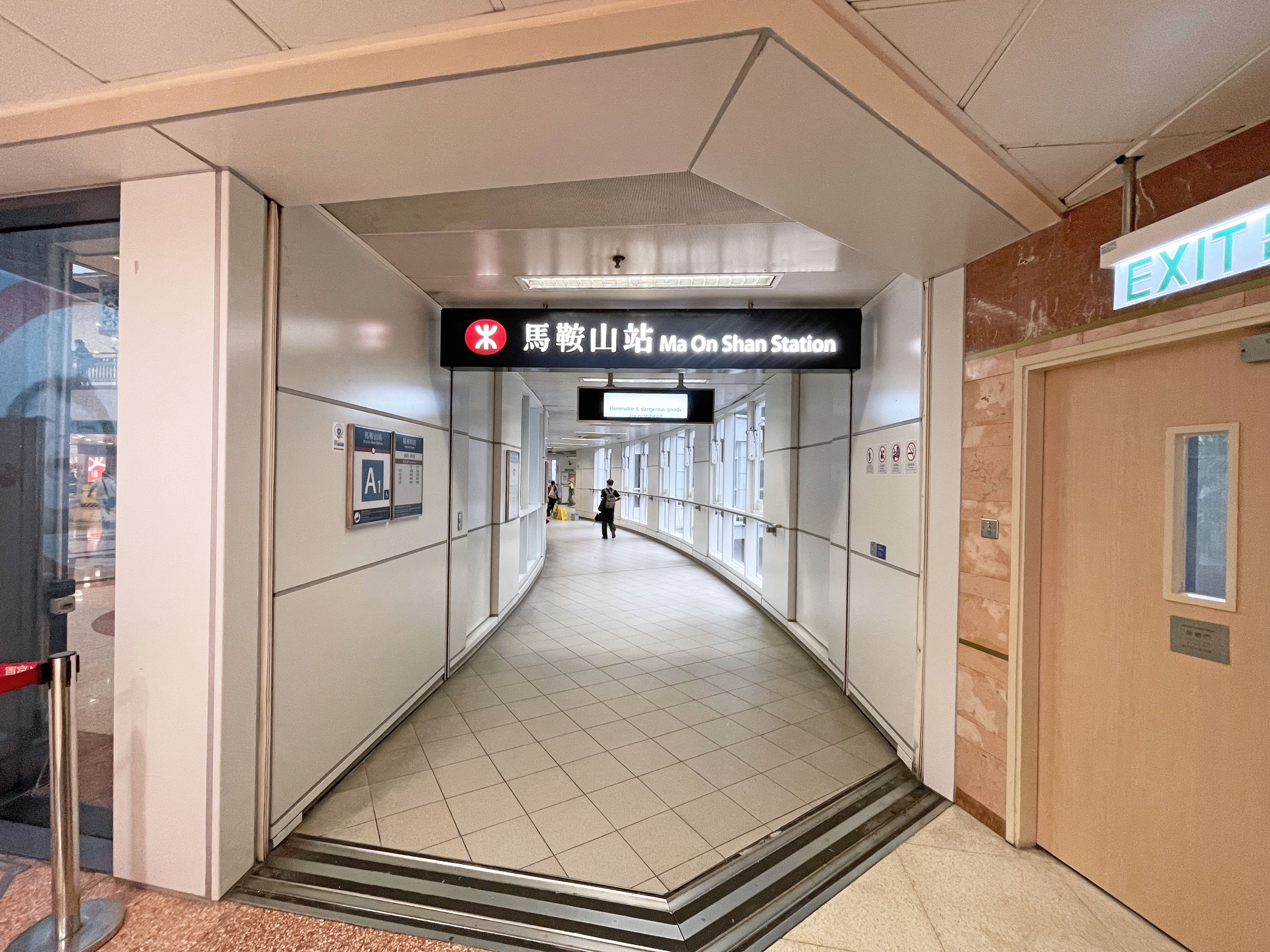
Exit A1

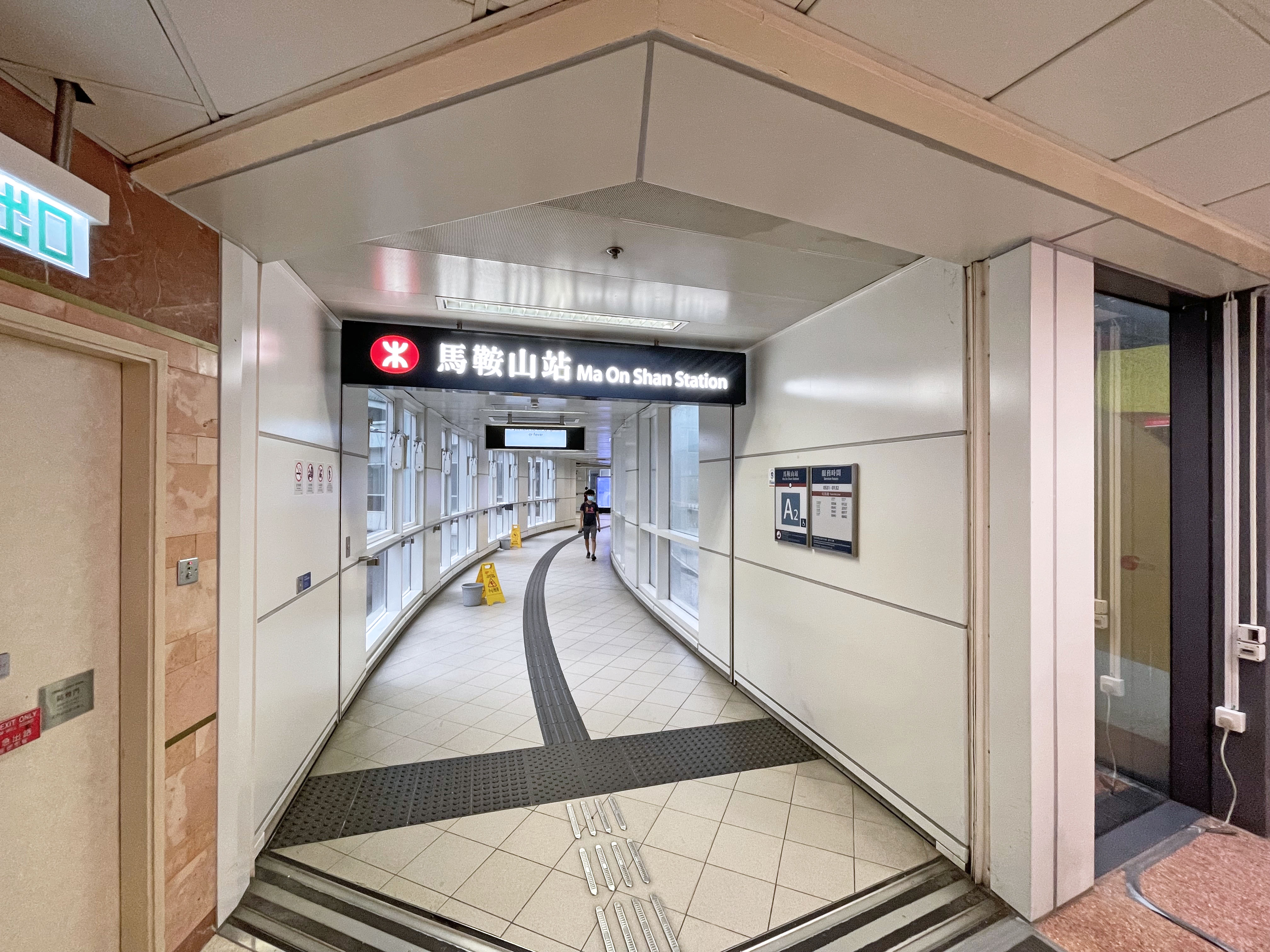
Exit A2

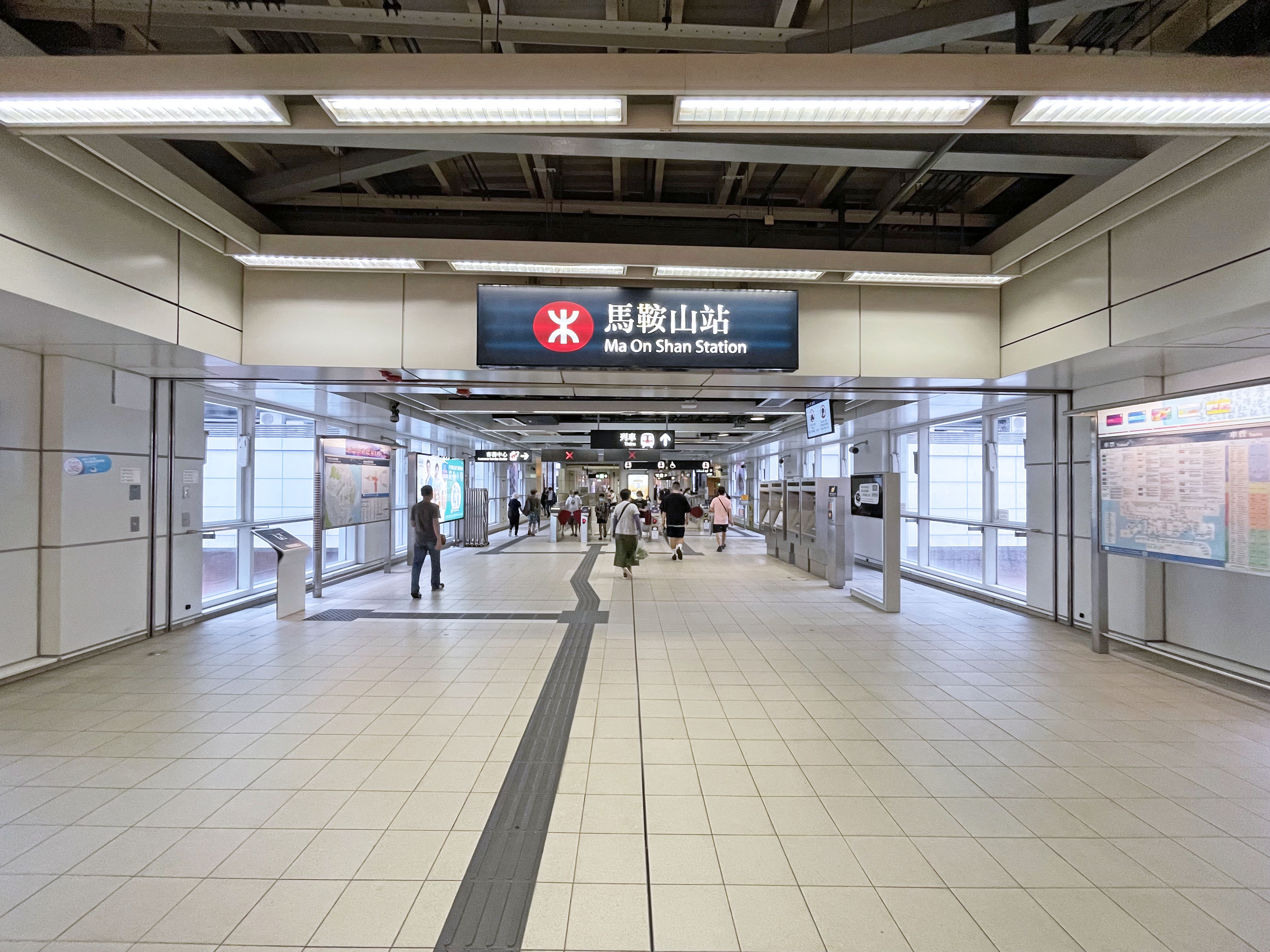
Exit B

== See also ==
- Ma On Shan (town)
