= MOS (brand) =

MOS (Magnetic Organization System)
- Product type: Magnetic computer, data, audio, and video cables storage and accessories
- Current owner: Sewell Development Corp.
- Country: United States
- Introduced: 2022; 4 years ago
- Website: sewelldirect.com

MOS (Magnetic Organization System) is an American brand of organizational tools that use magnetism to manage cables and other magnetic items.

== History ==
The brand was formed through crowdfunding on Kickstarter in August 2012. MOS has launched every subsequent product through the Kickstarter platform since.

=== Growth and expansion ===
In January 2014 MOS released Spring, a line of phone and audio cables, as well as a miniaturized version of the original Magnetic Organization System called MOS Menos. Later in June 2014 MOS started another Kickstarter campaign for the Reach project which made its goal of $50,000 in the first day of the Kickstarter campaign. The Reach campaign was funded at 284 percent of the initial goal on July 26, 2014. MOS is a brand of Sewell Development Corp.
