= Ma On Shan (town) =

New town in New Territories, Hong Kong

Coordinates: 22°25′19″N 114°13′57″E

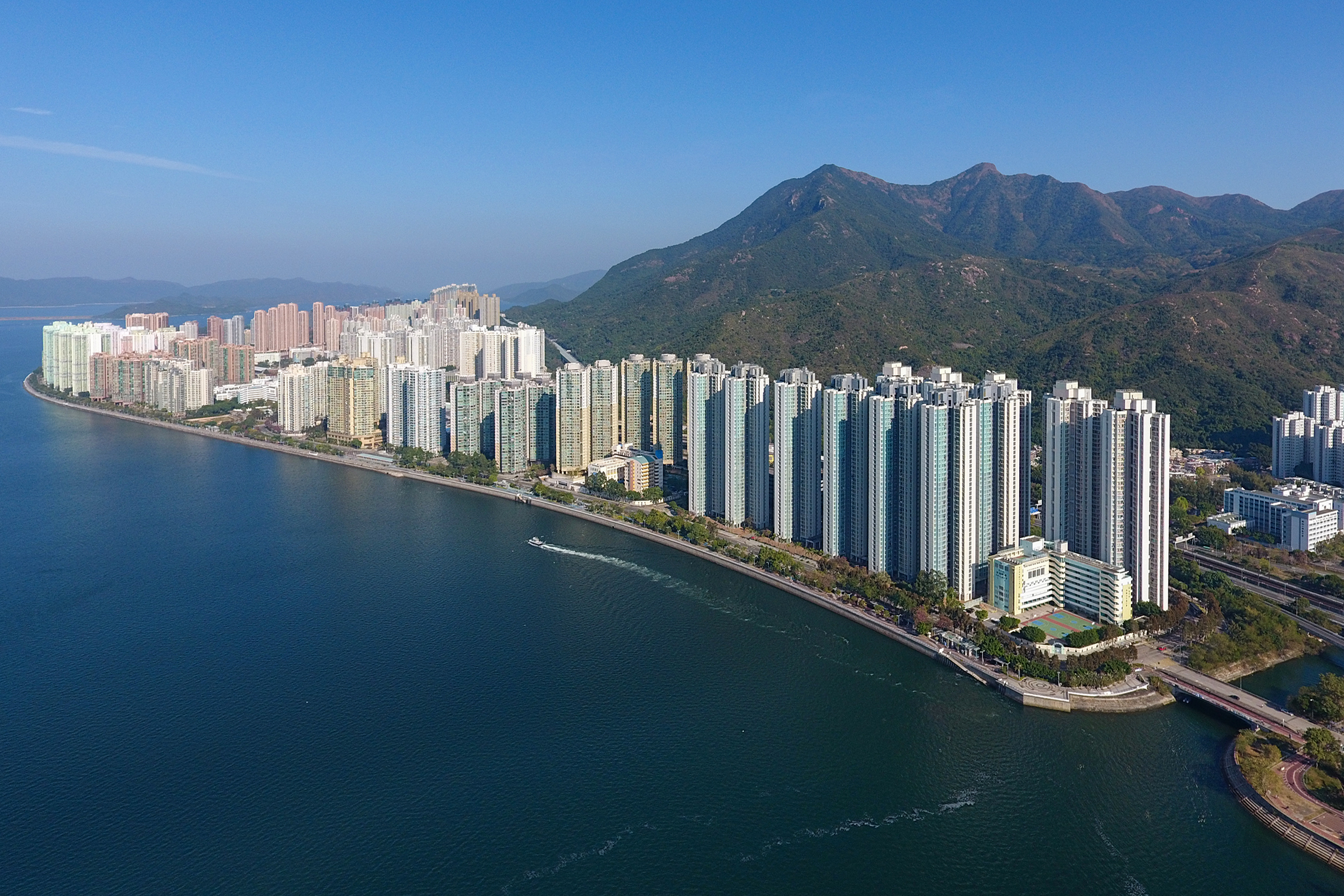
- View of Ma On Shan and the Tolo Harbour. The namesake mountain is visible in the background.
- Traditional Chinese: 馬鞍山
- Simplified Chinese: 马鞍山
- Literal meaning: Saddle Hill
Transcriptions
Standard Mandarin
- Hanyu Pinyin: Mǎ'ānshān
Yue: Cantonese
- Jyutping: maa^{5} on^{1} saan^{1}

Ma On Shan (Chinese: 馬鞍山) is a new town along the eastern coast of Tolo Harbour in the New Territories of Hong Kong. The neighbourhood takes its name from the twin peaks of Ma On Shan, which are partially located within the town.

Although it was initially an extension of Sha Tin New Town, Ma On Shan has its own town centre and various government facilities, and is now classified as a separate new town in government reports. Administratively, it belongs to Sha Tin District.

== Geography ==
Ma On Shan is located by the west face of the twin peaks of Ma On Shan, which can be translated as "horse saddle mountain". Situated in the northeastern part of Sha Tin District, the town is built on the strip between Tolo Harbour and Ma On Shan mountain. It is bordered by Wu Kai Sha to the north and by Tai Shui Hang to the south.

== History ==
The original Ma On Shan Village still houses around 80 families. Yan Kwong Lutheran Church, one of two original churches established during the area's mining heyday, was revitalised in around 2014 as a centre to highlight the history and culture of the old village.

Deep inside the slope of Ma On Shan was an iron mine. Due to the mine's unprofitability, the 1970s energy crisis, as well as the progressing New Town development, Ma On Shan Iron Mine was closed in 1976.

The area was formerly the site of Whitehead Detention Centre, which housed Vietnamese boat people between 1989 and 1997.

=== Three treasures ===
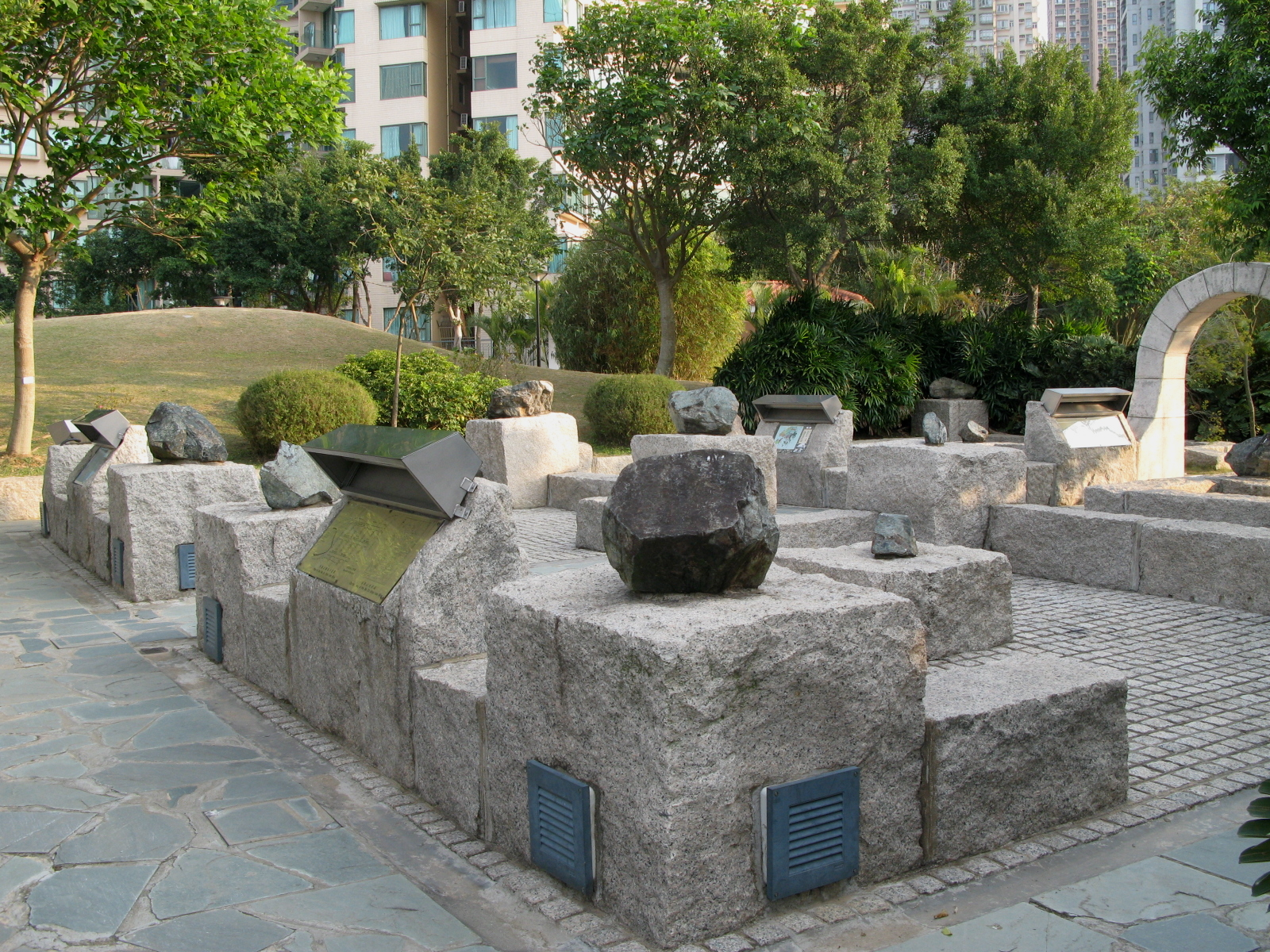
Ma On Shan Park mining history display area within Ma On Shan Park.

Historically, the three treasures of Ma On Shan were:

1. Iron ore: The deposit is estimated to have comprised over 7 million tonnes. The iron extracted from the 1950s to 1970s was mainly exported to Japan.

2. Azaleas: The azalea species Rhododendron hongkongense was discovered in Hong Kong in 1851 but was mistaken for another, only acquiring its "Hongkong" name in 1930. The species, which is found only on Ma On Shan and a few nearby sites, blooms in April with colours ranging from white to light red. Since 2006, an annual "Ma On Shan Azalea Festival" has promoted the azalea as the symbol of the district, celebrating six locally native species: (Rhododendron championae, Rhododendron farrerae, Rhododendron hongkongense, Rhododendron moulmainense, Rhododendron simiarum and Rhododendron simsii) Various activities are held, including planting azaleas in housing estates and greenery areas, a photo-taking competition, painting competition, and exhibitions. The event is organised by Sha Tin East Area Committee of the District Council, Sha Tin District Office, Civil Engineering and Development Department, Leisure and Cultural Services Department, Ma On Shan Promotion of Livelihood and Recreation Association, the MTRC and various other bodies.

3. Indian muntjac (Muntiacus muntjak): The natural habitat of this deer species includes Hong Kong and goes as far west as India, Pakistan and Afghanistan. The male has short antlers and canine teeth and likes to rest in bushes or tall grass. It feeds on leaves, underground roots and tubers, and sometimes tree bark. They live alone and if they are scared or during the mating season, produce a strange bark, hence their nickname barking deer. They are timid and shy, with records showing that some local specimens died of fright when captured.

Development of public housing estates commenced in the mid-1980s, with Heng On Estate completed in 1987, followed by Chevalier Garden in 1988. The Ma On Shan line of the MTR, previously the KCR Ma On Shan Rail, was opened in 2004. It was later merged into the Tuen Ma Line.

== Demographics ==
According to the 2016 by-Census, Ma On Shan has a population of 209,714, and 94% of the population is of Chinese ethnicity. Average household size is 3.1, and median monthly domestic household income is HK$33,000.

== Shopping centres ==
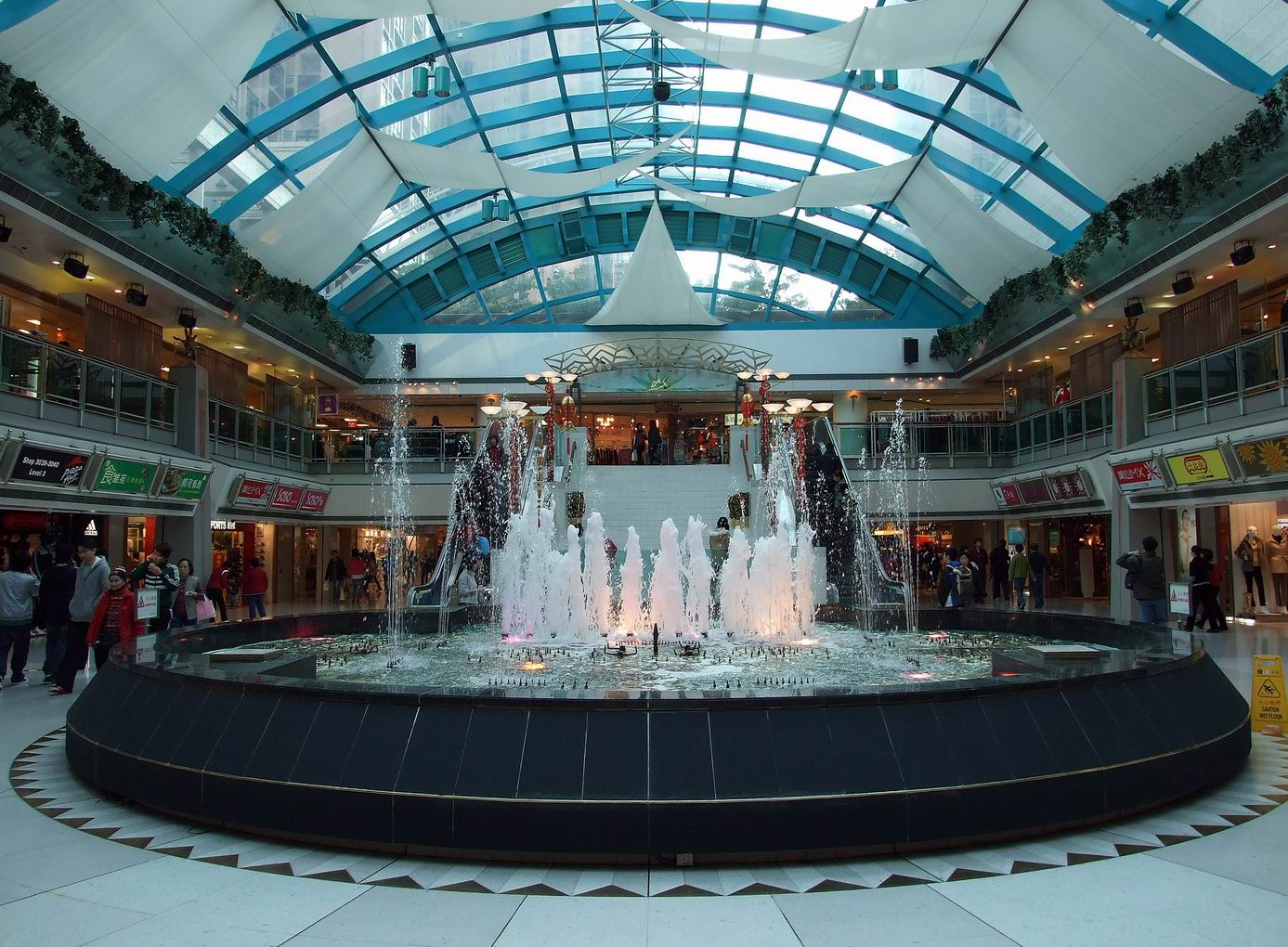
Sunshine City Plaza in 2008

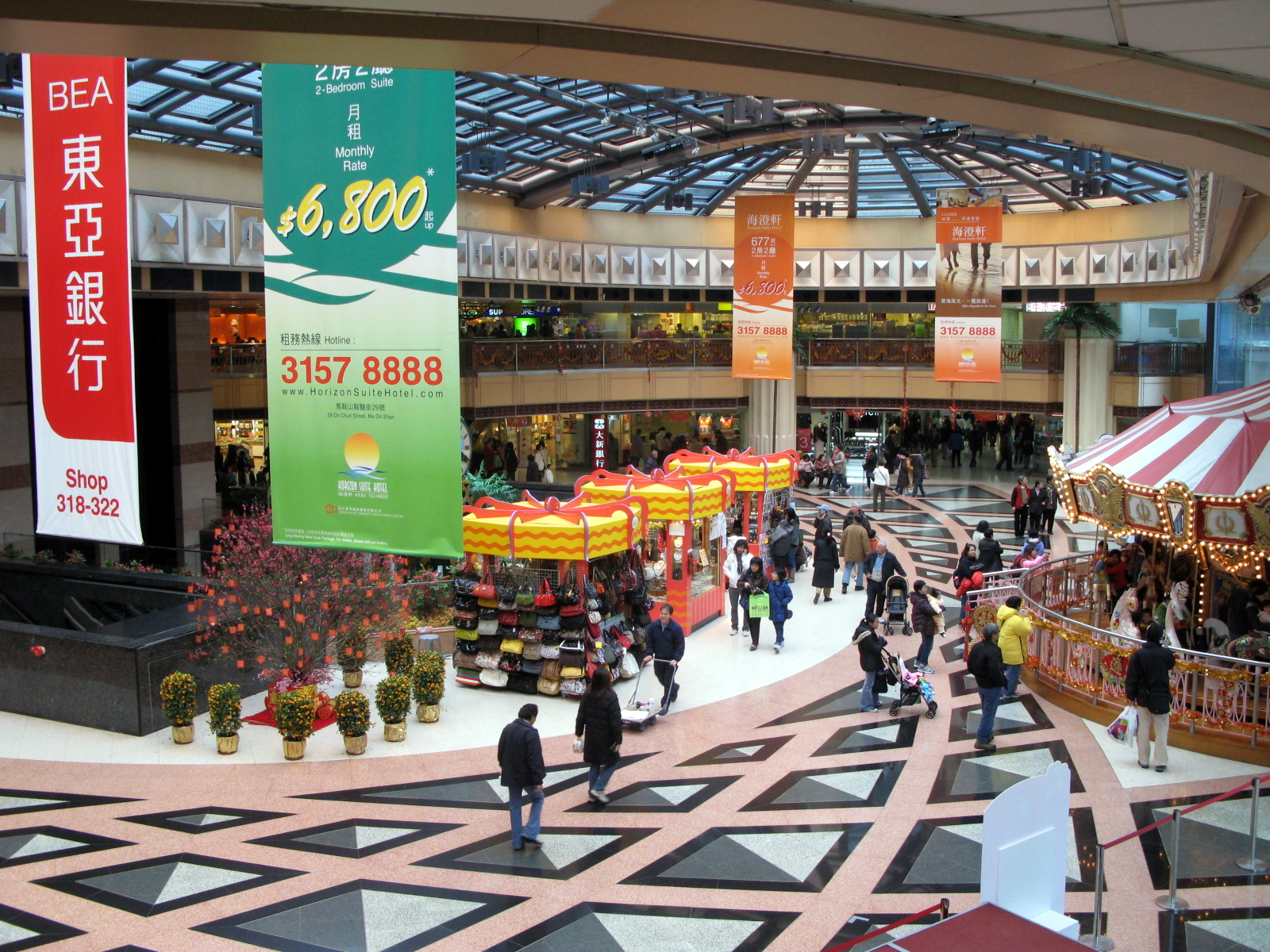
Ma On Shan Plaza

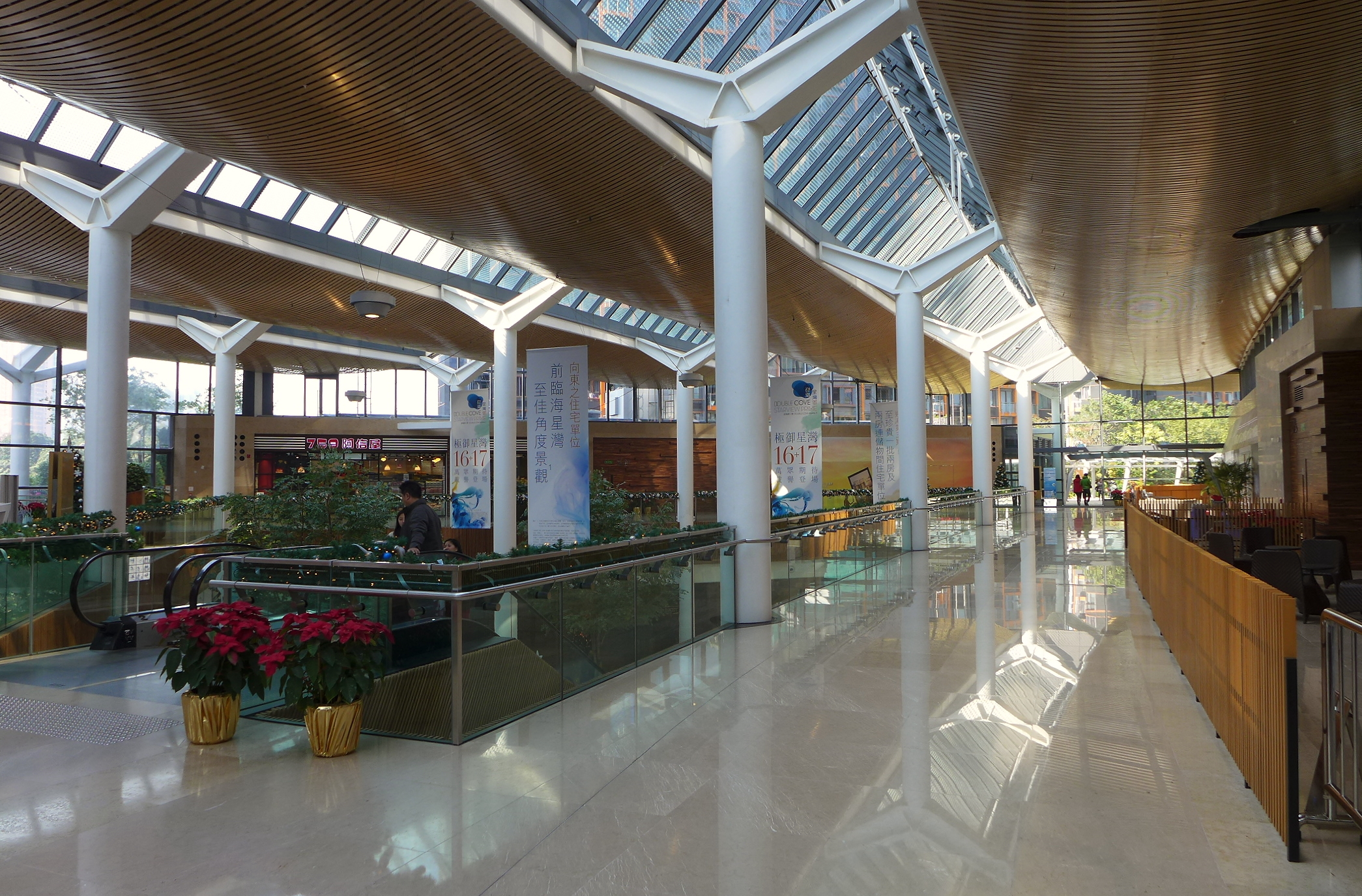
Double Cove Place

The town features a three-storey shopping centre, MOSTown. Connected to MOSTown is Ma On Shan Plaza.

=== Ma On Shan Plaza ===
Ma On Shan Plaza is a shopping centre in the town centre of Ma On Shan in the Sha Tin District. Located on Sai Sha Road, it is connected to MOSTown and the Ma On Shan station of the MTR Tuen Ma line by footbridges. It is an associated shopping centre built together with the residential estate of Bayshore Towers, developed by Cheung Kong Holdings. The shopping centre has been famous for its indoor merry-go-round for the amusement of visitors who purchase items in any shops in the shopping arcade up to a certain amount.

=== MOSTown ===
MOSTown is large shopping centre selling a wide range of items. Many shops are clothing shops, including well-known labels like Levi's, Bauhaus, Adidas, Giordano, and many others mostly specialising in women's fashion. MOSTown also houses a large "Citistore" department store selling clothes, mattresses, beds, toys, electrical appliances, luggage and more.

Numerous restaurants can be found in the plaza including local Cantonese eateries and branches of Western chains such as McDonald's and KFC. A large "Market Place by Jasons" supermarket is present as are cosmetics shops, hairdressers, tea houses, bakeries, shoe-shops, a chemist and a classic favourite: an HK "$12" shop.

=== Sunshine Bazaar ===
Sunshine Bazaar is a small arcade-size retail space that features a bank, pet shop, music store, family medical centre and tutorial centre(s).

== Private housing estates ==
Ma On Shan is an area with a high density of private housing estate. Some of the larger private housing estates in Ma On Shan are:

- Monte Vista – built by Hutchison Whampoa in 2000, and consists of 1,606 residential units.
- Sunshine City – constructed by Henderson Land Development in five phases during the 1990's, contains more than 5,000 residential units.
- Villa Athena – built by Sun Hung Kai Properties Ltd. in 1994 and consists of 1,180 residential units.
- Vista Paradiso – built by Hutchison Whampoa in 1998, and consists of 2,032 residential units.
- Lake Silver
- Double Cove
- The waterside

== Public facilities ==
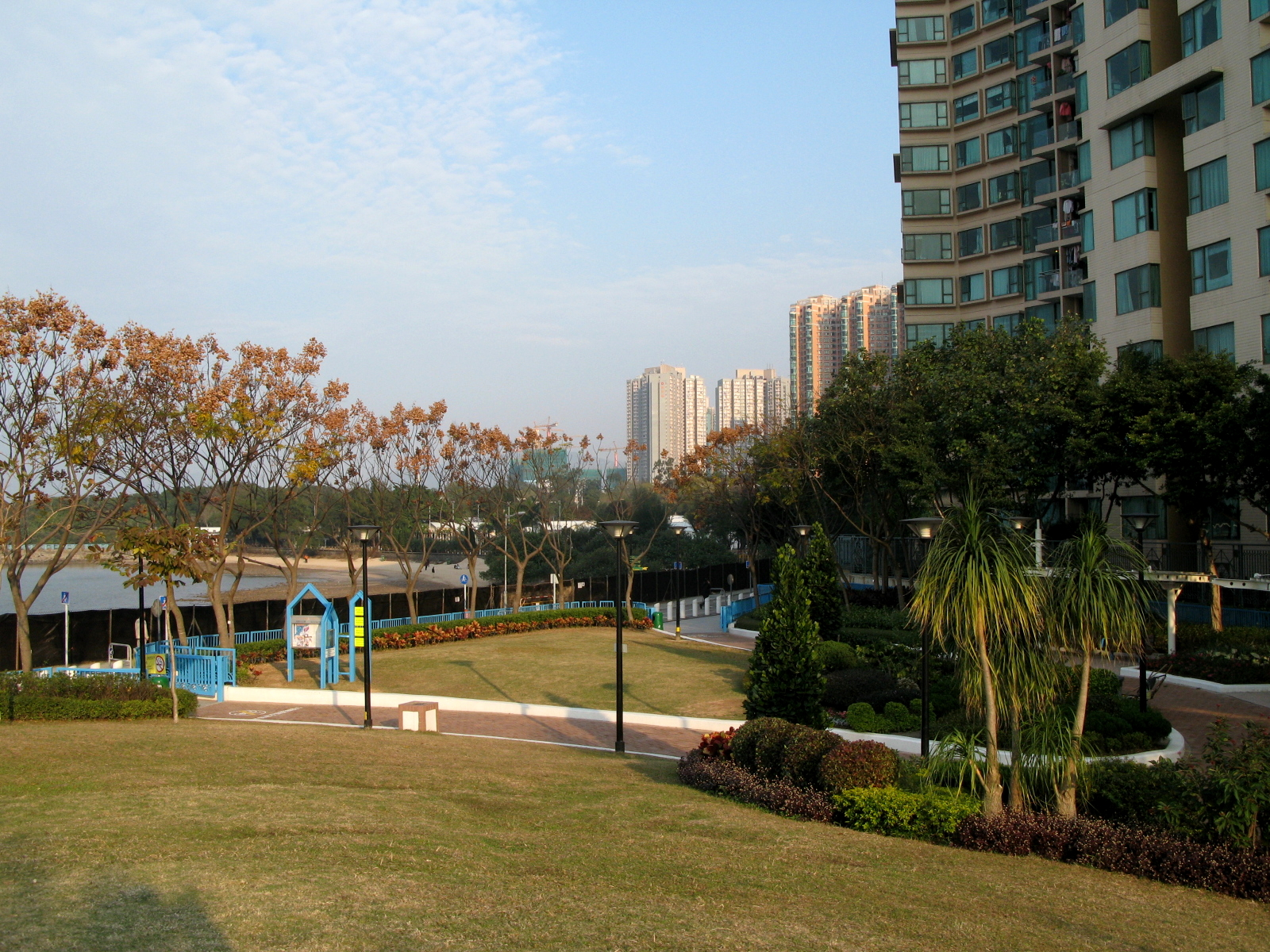
Ma On Shan Park.

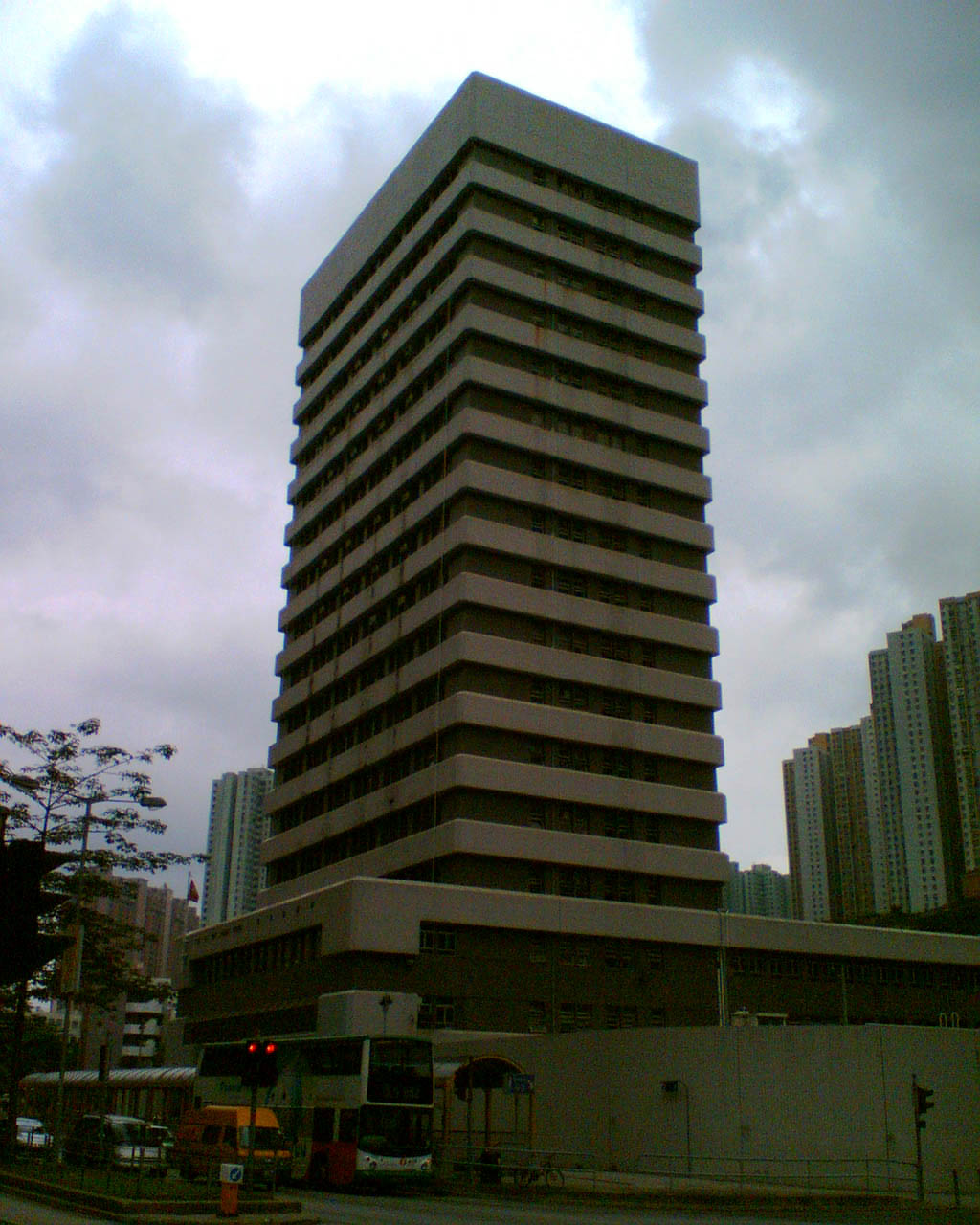
Ma On Shan Police Station.

The Ma On Shan Sports Ground is open all week. Badminton courts and table-tennis tables abound, and the cost of a badminton court for one hour is around HK$60 (half-price for students). Near the sports centre is the Ma On Shan Public Swimming Pool.

The Ma On Shan Public Library, completed in 2005, is within walking distance from the sports centre and the swimming pool. The library provides an alternative location for reading and research to the Sha Tin Public Library.

== Education ==
Ma On Shan is in Primary One Admission (POA) School Net 89. Within the school net are multiple aided schools (operated independently but funded with government money); no government schools are in the net.

Schools in Ma On Shan:

- Renaissance College Hong Kong
- Hong Kong Taoist Association Shun Yeung Primary School
- Ma On Shan Ling Liang Primary School
- Tak Sun Secondary School
- Li Po Chun United World College
- Po Leung Kuk Cornell Memorial College
- Po Leung Kuk Chong Kee Ting Primary School
- ESF International Kindergarten Wu Kai Sha
- C.U.H.K.F.A.A. Chan Chun Ha Secondary School

Hong Kong Public Libraries operates the Ma On Shan Public Library.

== Public Transport ==
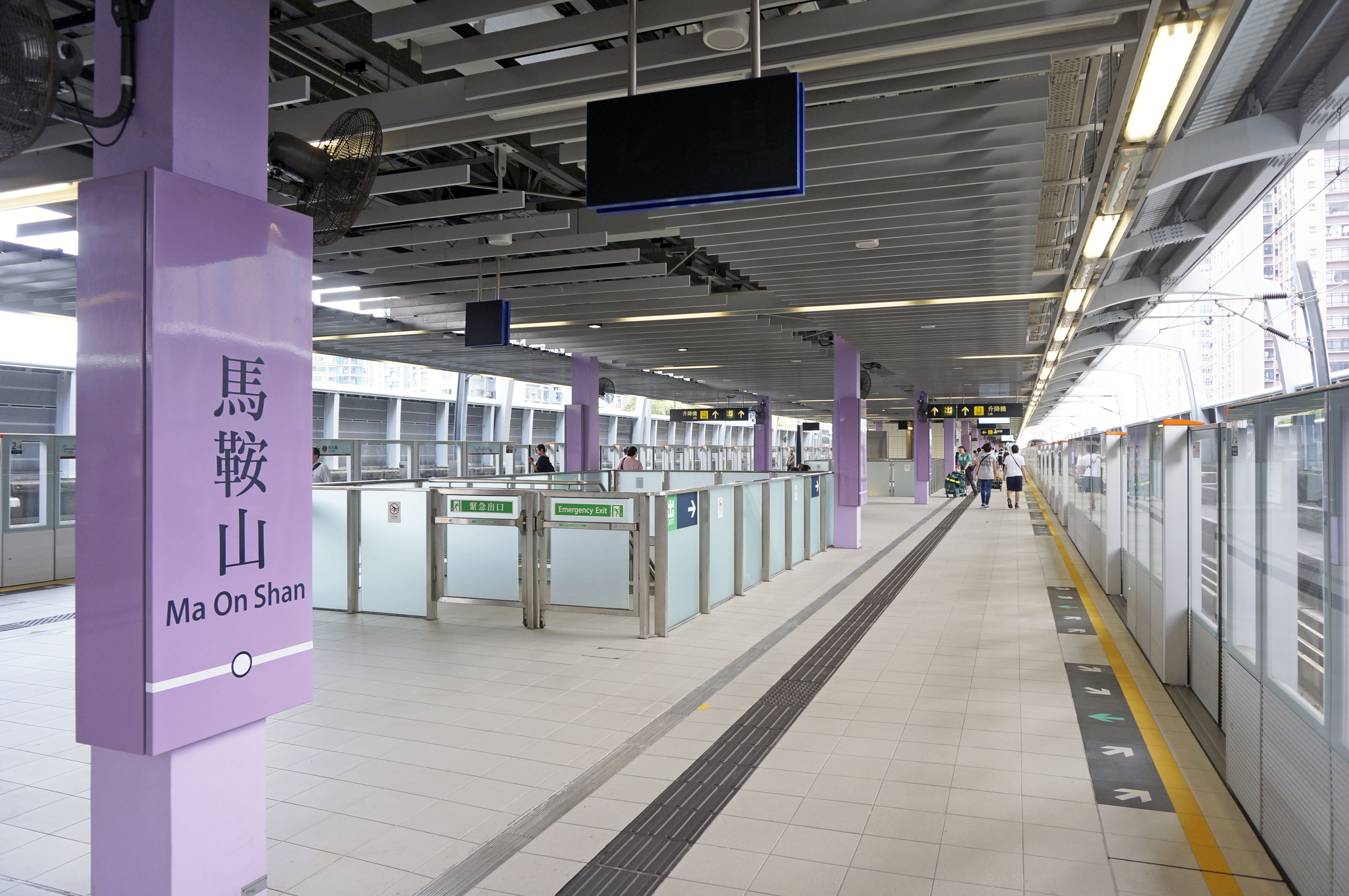
Ma On Shan MTR Station.

=== Trains ===
Ma On Shan is served by the Tuen Ma line of the MTR network. It was opened as the Ma On Shan line on 21 December 2004 by the Kowloon–Canton Railway, and merged with the West Rail line on 27 June 2021. It starts at Tuen Mun, has direct service to Yuen Long and Tsuen Wan. The line merged into the Ma On Shan line at Hung Hom station, and the stations are Tai Shui Hang, Heng On, Ma On Shan and Wu Kai Sha, where it terminates, lie between Ma On Shan. Passengers can change at Tai Wai or Hung Hom to the East Rail line for service to Hong Kong Island, Kowloon or the mainland border crossings at Lo Wu and Lok Ma Chau, Diamond Hill or Ho Man Tin to the Kwun Tong line for service to Kowloon, Nam Cheong to the Tung Chung line for service to Hong Kong Island, Tsing Yi, or Lantau Island, or Mei Foo to the Tsuen Wan line for service to Hong Kong Island, western Kowloon, or Tsuen Wan.

=== Buses ===
Numerous buses and public light buses serve the area and connect residents to nearby places including Sha Tin, Tai Po, and Kowloon, including a number of cross-harbour routes to Hong Kong Island. The city is served by several bus termini, with the ones in Ma On Shan Town Centre and Lee On being notable.

=== Taxis ===
Ma On Shan is served by both green and red taxis. Green taxis only serve the New Territories, while the pricier Red Taxis serve the urban areas of Hong Kong Island and Kowloon.

== Government and politics ==
=== District Council ===
Ma On Shan is administratively part of Sha Tin District. At the 2019 District Council election, which was the last local election before the 2023 electoral changes, the neighbourhood returned 13 councillors to the 42-seat Sha Tin District Council, with all 13 Ma On Shan constituencies electing councillors belonging to the pan-democratic camp, with the MOS Guardians becoming the largest party in Ma On Shan.

As a result of the 2023 electoral changes, Ma On Shan is now split between the Sha Tin North and Sha Tin East constituencies, with the majority of the former Ma On Shan constituencies forming Sha Tin North. The constituency is currently represented by Choi Wai-shing of the DAB and Anna Law Yi-lam of the New People's Party.

=== Legislative Council ===
As of the 2021 Legislative Council elections, Ma On Shan, along with Sai Kung and the rest of eastern Sha Tin, forms part of the New Territories South East constituency, which returns two members to the Legislative Council. The constituency is currently represented by Stanley Li Sai-wing of the DAB and Connie Lam So-wai of Professional Power.

Prior to the 2021 electoral changes, Ma On Shan was part of the New Territories East constituency, which also contained Tai Po District, North District, Sai Kung District, and the rest of Sha Tin District.

== See also ==
- Ma On Shan (peak)
- Ma On Shan Country Park
- Ma On Shan Park
- Ma On Shan Plaza
- Ma On Shan Road
