= Heng On =

Heng On may refer to:

- Heng On (constituency), a constituency of the Sha Tin District Council
- Heng On Estate, a public housing estate in Ma On Shan, Hong Kong
- Heng On station, an MTR rapid transit station adjacent to the estate
