= Yan On Estate =

Public housing estate in Ma On Shan, Hong Kong

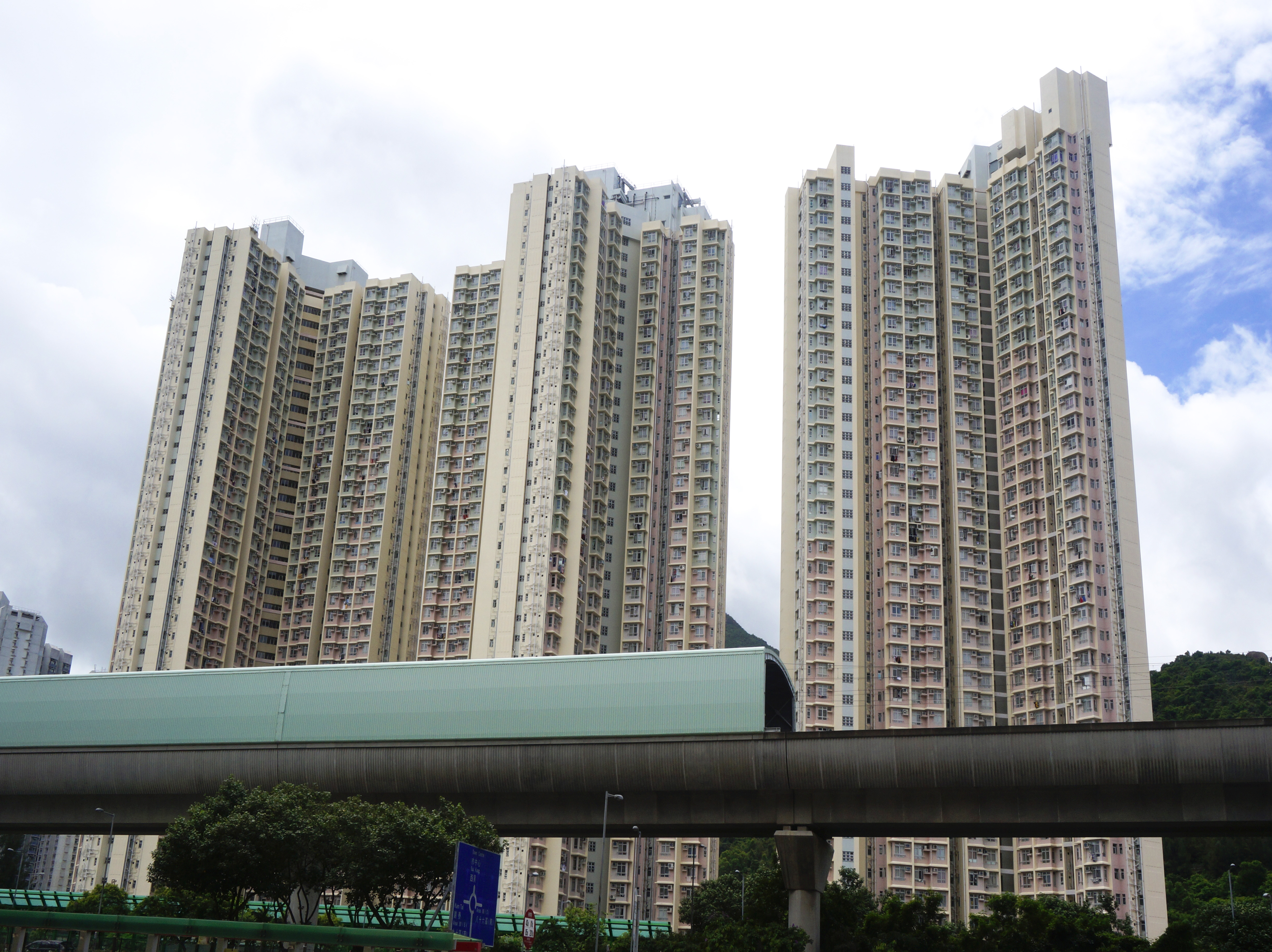
- Yan On Estate
- Interactive map of Yan On Estate

General information
- Location: 3 Hang Chi Street, Ma On Shan; New Territories, Hong Kong
- Coordinates: 22.414384°N 114.225435°E
- Status: Completed
- Category: Public rental housing
- Population: 6,116 (2016)
- No. of blocks: 3
- No. of units: 2,587

Construction
- Constructed: 2011; 15 years ago
- Authority: Hong Kong Housing Authority

Yan On Estate (Chinese: 欣安邨) is a public housing estate in Ma On Shan, New Territories, Hong Kong located south of Heng On Estate. The HK$800 million construction contract was awarded by the Housing Authority to Yau Lee Construction in 2009. The new estate opened in 2011 and comprises three blocks and a small commercial centre. It is designed to house about 6,800 residents in 2,587 flats. The estate is within walking distance of Heng On station on the Tuen Ma line.

== Houses ==
Name	Chinese name	Building type	Completed
Yan Chung House	欣頌樓	Non-standard	2011
Yan Hei House	欣喜樓	Non-standard	2011
Yan Yuet House	欣悅樓	Non-standard	2011

== Demographics ==
According to the 2016 by-census, Yan On Estate had a population of 6,116. The median age was 41 and the majority of residents (98.1 per cent) were of Chinese ethnicity. The average household size was 2.4 people. The median monthly household income of all households (i.e. including both economically active and inactive households) was HK$18,000.

== Politics ==
Yan On Estate is located in Tai Shui Hang constituency of the Sha Tin District Council. It was formerly represented by Michael Yung Ming-chau, who was elected in the 2019 elections until July 2021.

== See also ==
- Public housing estates in Ma On Shan
