= Chevalier Garden =

Public housing estate in Ma On Shan, Hong Kong

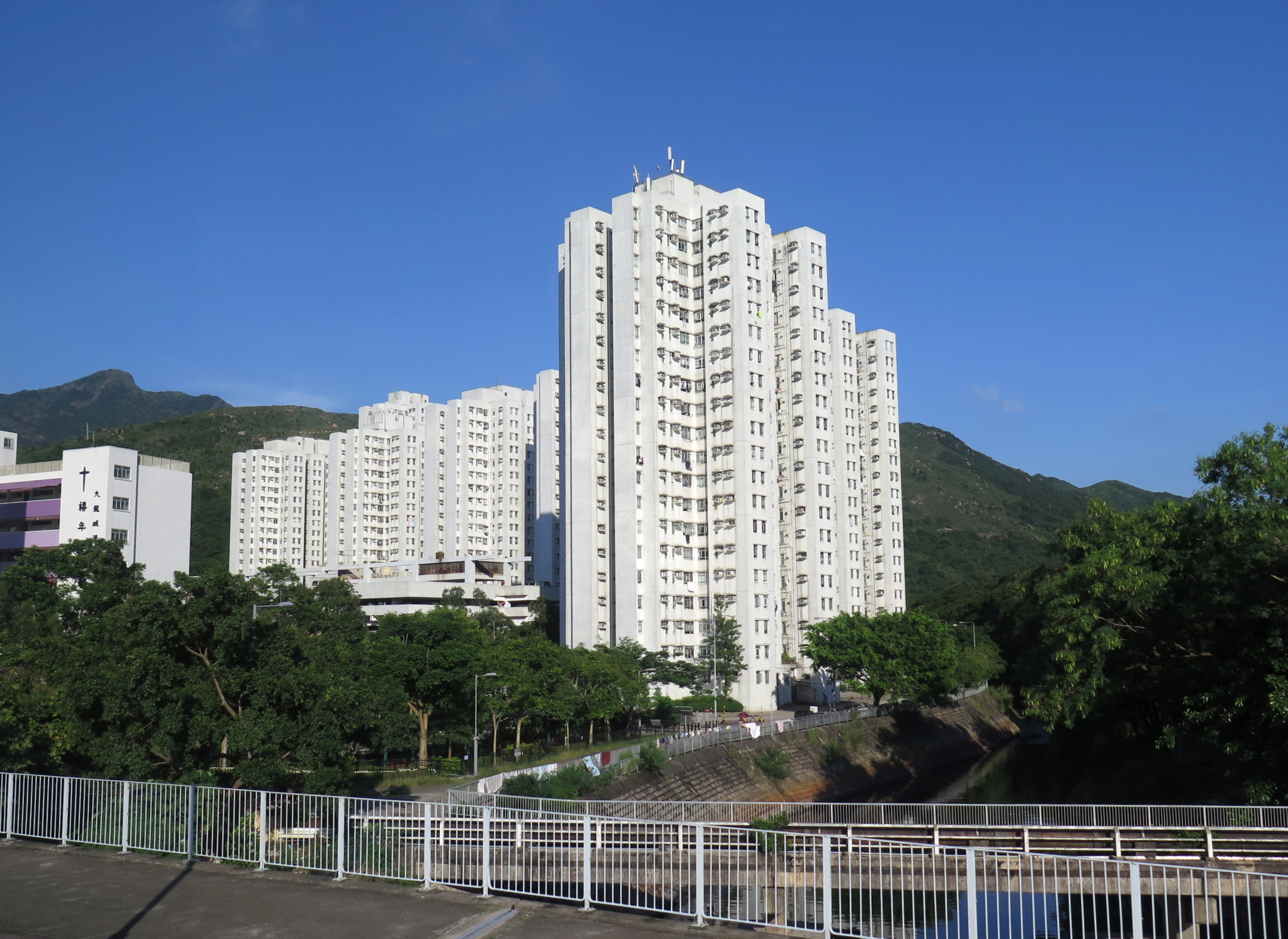
- Chevalier Garden
- Interactive map of Chevalier Garden

General information
- Location: 2 Hang Shun Street, Ma On Shan; New Territories, Hong Kong
- Coordinates: 22.40462°N 114.22385°E
- Status: Completed
- Category: Home Ownership Scheme
- Population: 11,064 (2016)
- No. of blocks: 17
- No. of units: 3,942

Construction
- Constructed: 1987; 39 years ago
- Contractors: Chevalier Group
- Authority: Hong Kong Housing Authority

Chevalier Garden (Chinese: 富安花園) is a Home Ownership Scheme and Private Sector Participation Scheme court in Tai Shui Hang, Ma On Shan, New Territories, Hong Kong near MTR Tai Shui Hang station. It was jointly developed by the Hong Kong Housing Authority and Chevalier Group, and it was the first HOS court developed by Chevalier Group. It has a total of seventeen blocks built between 1987 and 1988.

== Background ==
Chevalier Garden is the first public housing estate in Hong Kong to be built by the Chevalier Group. Later, Chevalier Group had built several public housing estates in Hong Kong, such as Beverly Garden in Tseung Kwan O, Charming Garden in Mong Kok, Cheerful Garden, Fullview Garden and Harmony Garden in Siu Sai Wan, Elegance Garden in Tai Po, Glorious Garden in Tuen Mun, Grandway Garden in Tai Wai and Saddle Ridge Garden in Ma On Shan.

== Houses ==
| Name | Chinese name | Building type | Completed |
|---|---|---|---|
| Block 1 | 第1座 | Private Sector Participation Scheme | 1987 |
| Block 2 | 第2座 | Private Sector Participation Scheme | 1987 |
| Block 3 | 第3座 | Private Sector Participation Scheme | 1987 |
| Block 4 | 第4座 | Private Sector Participation Scheme | 1987 |
| Block 5 | 第5座 | Private Sector Participation Scheme | 1987 |
| Block 6 | 第6座 | Private Sector Participation Scheme | 1987 |
| Block 7 | 第7座 | Private Sector Participation Scheme | 1987 |
| Block 8 | 第8座 | Private Sector Participation Scheme | 1987 |
| Block 9 | 第9座 | Private Sector Participation Scheme | 1987 |
| Block 10 | 第10座 | Private Sector Participation Scheme | 1987 |
| Block 11 | 第11座 | Private Sector Participation Scheme | 1988 |
| Block 12 | 第12座 | Private Sector Participation Scheme | 1988 |
| Block 13 | 第13座 | Private Sector Participation Scheme | 1988 |
| Block 14 | 第14座 | Private Sector Participation Scheme | 1988 |
| Block 15 | 第15座 | Private Sector Participation Scheme | 1988 |
| Block 16 | 第16座 | Private Sector Participation Scheme | 1988 |
| Block 17 | 第17座 | Private Sector Participation Scheme | 1988 |

== Demographics ==
According to the 2016 by-census, Chevalier Garden had a population of 11,064. The median age was 50.1 and the majority of residents (95.7 per cent) were of Chinese ethnicity. The average household size was 3 people. The median monthly household income of all households (i.e. including both economically active and inactive households) was HK$36,670.

== Politics ==
Chevalier Garden is located in Tai Shui Hang constituency of the Sha Tin District Council. It was formerly represented by Michael Yung Ming-chau, who was elected in the 2019 elections until July 2021.

== See also ==
- Public housing estates in Ma On Shan
