= Fu Fai Garden =

Public housing estate in Ma On Shan, Hong Kong

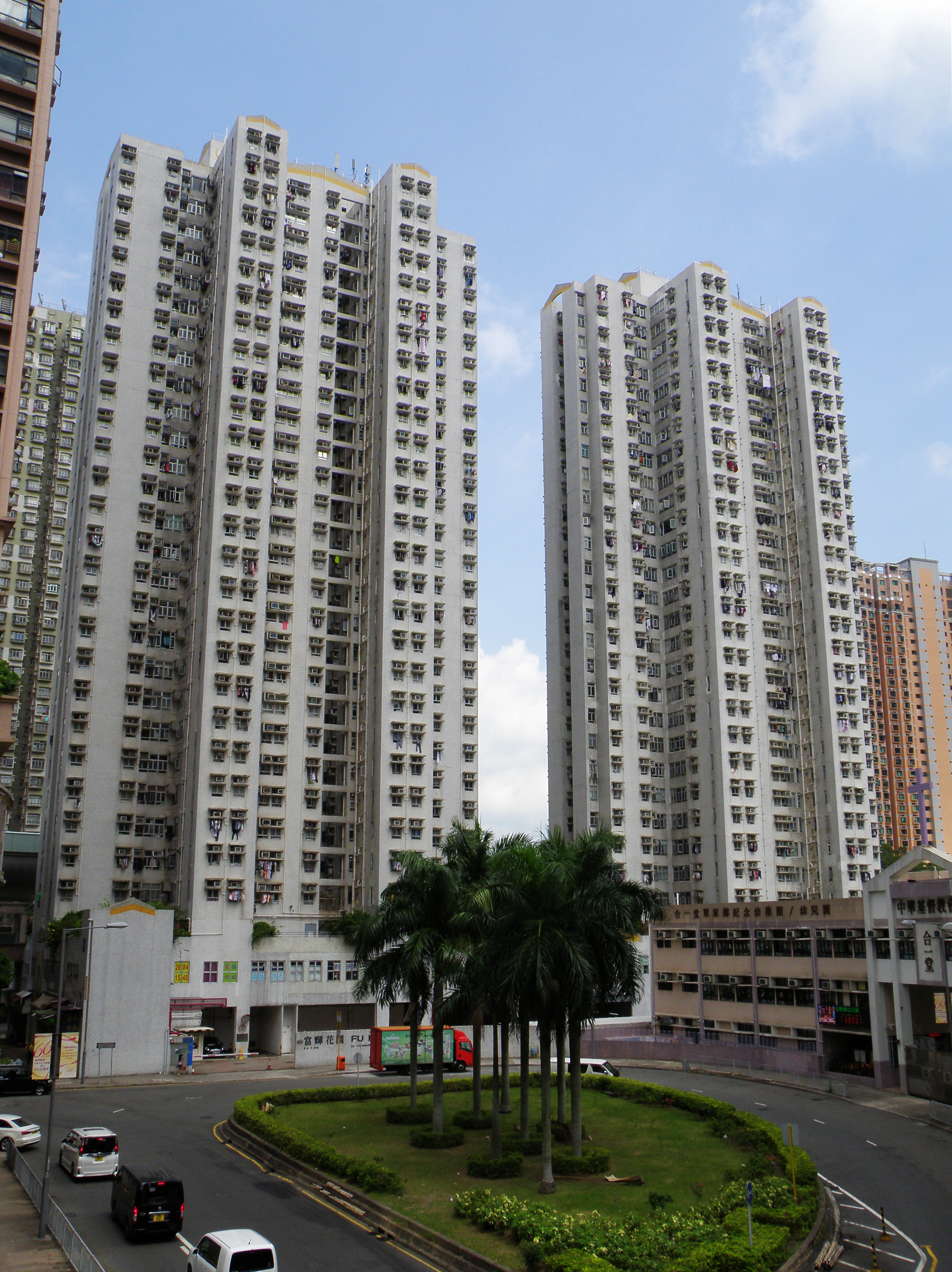
- Fu Fai Garden
- Interactive map of Fu Fai Garden

General information
- Location: 28 On Shing Street, Ma On Shan; New Territories, Hong Kong
- Coordinates: 22.4248429°N 114.2334399°E
- Status: Completed
- Category: Home Ownership Scheme
- No. of blocks: 2
- No. of units: 520

Construction
- Constructed: 1991; 35 years ago
- Contractors: China Civil Engineering Construction Corporation
- Authority: Hong Kong Housing Authority

Fu Fai Garden (Chinese: 富輝花園) is a Home Ownership Scheme and Private Sector Participation Scheme court built on reclaimed land in Ma On Shan, New Territories, Hong Kong near Ma On Shan Plaza, MOSTown and MTR Ma On Shan station. It was jointly developed by the Hong Kong Housing Authority and China Civil Engineering Construction Corporation and has a total of two blocks built in 1991.

== Houses ==
Name	Chinese name	Building type	Completed
Block 1	第1座	Private Sector Participation Scheme	1991
Block 2	第2座	Private Sector Participation Scheme	1991

== Politics ==
Fu Fai Garden is located in Ma On Shan Town Centre constituency of the Sha Tin District Council. It is currently represented by Johnny Chung Lai-him, who was elected in the 2019 elections.

== See also ==
- Public housing estates in Ma On Shan
