= Fok On Garden =

Public housing estate in Ma On Shan, Hong Kong

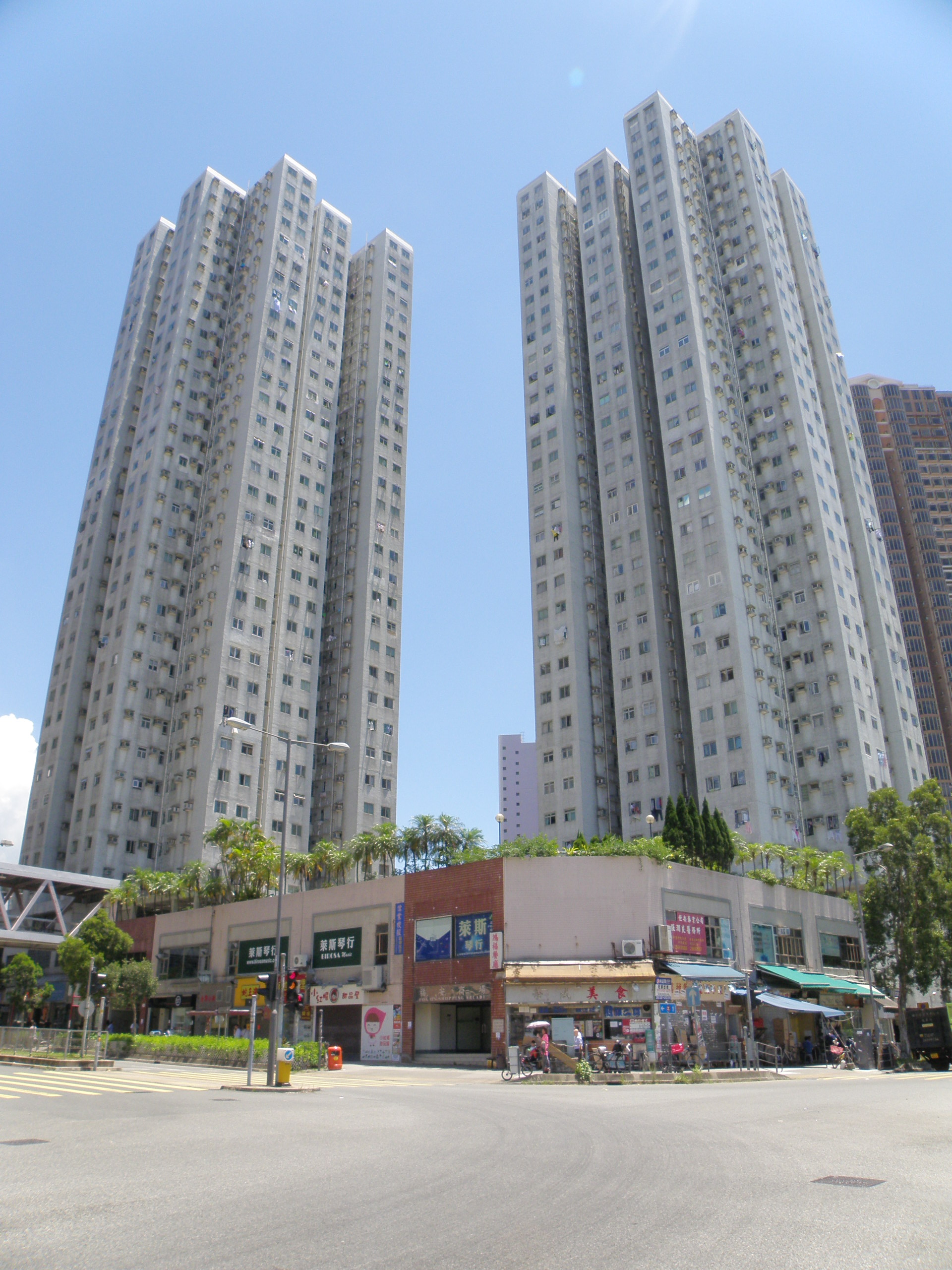
- Fok On Garden
- Interactive map of Fok On Garden

General information
- Location: 11 On Chun Street, Ma On Shan; New Territories, Hong Kong
- Coordinates: 22.424801°N 114.2288337°E
- Status: Completed
- Category: Home Ownership Scheme
- No. of blocks: 2
- No. of units: 600

Construction
- Constructed: 1992; 34 years ago
- Authority: Hong Kong Housing Authority

Fok On Garden (Chinese: 福安花園) is a Home Ownership Scheme and Private Sector Participation Scheme court built on reclaimed land in Ma On Shan, New Territories, Hong Kong near The Waterside, MOSTown and MTR Ma On Shan station. It has a total of two blocks built in 1992.

== Houses ==
Name	Chinese name	Building type	Completed
Block 1	第1座	Private Sector Participation Scheme	1992
Block 2	第2座	Private Sector Participation Scheme	1992

== Politics ==
Fok On Garden is located in Ma On Shan Town Centre constituency of the Sha Tin District Council. It is currently represented by Johnny Chung Lai-him, who was elected in the 2019 elections.

== See also ==
- Public housing estates in Ma On Shan
