= Tai Shui Hang station =

MTR station in the New Territories, Hong Kong

Tai Shui Hang 大水坑
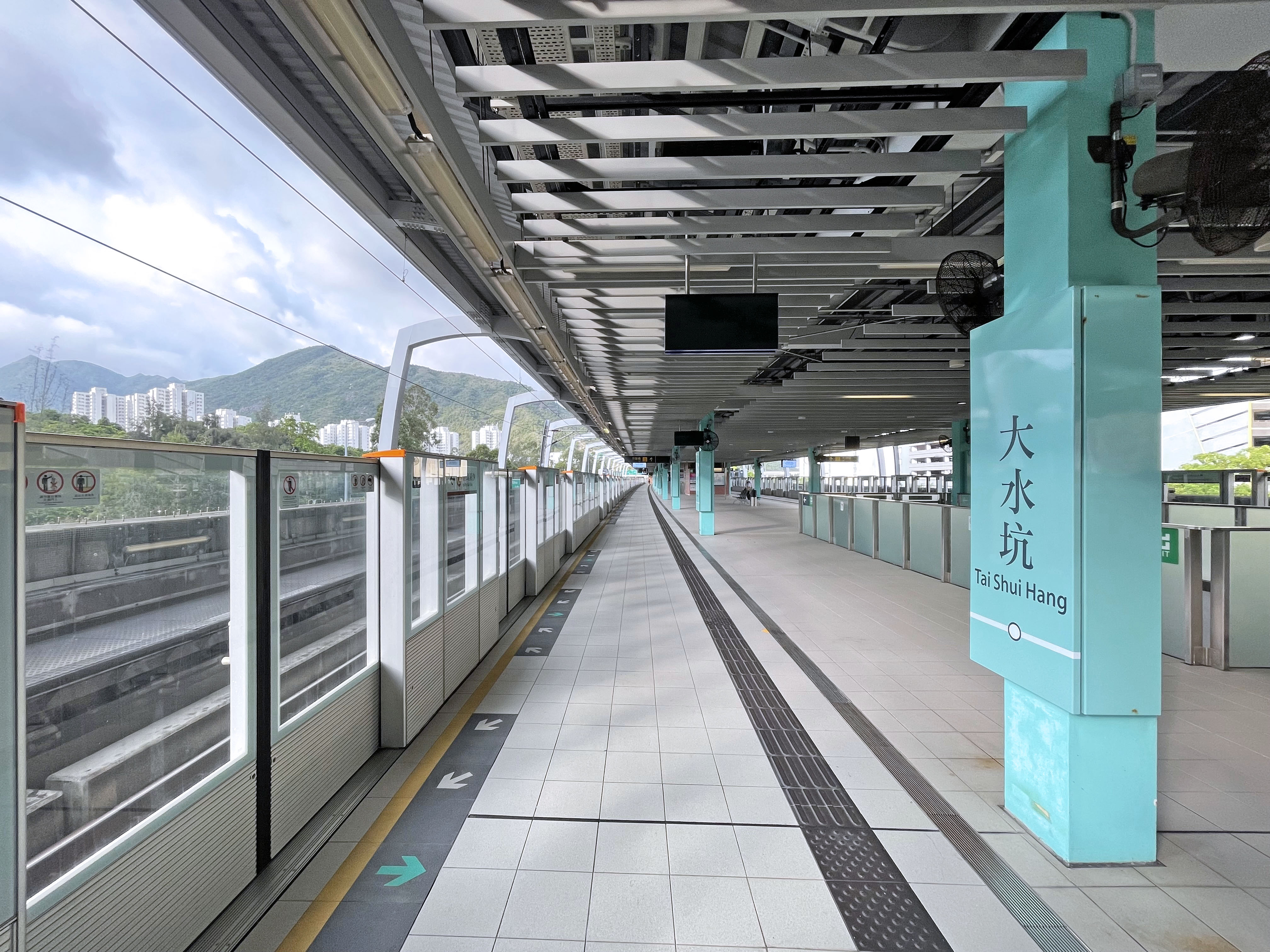
- Platform 2

Chinese name
- Chinese: 大水坑
- Cantonese Yale: Daaihséuihāang
- Literal meaning: Great Water
Transcriptions
Standard Mandarin
- Hanyu Pinyin: Dàshuǐkēng
Yue: Cantonese
- Yale Romanization: Daaihséuihāang
- Jyutping: Daai6seoi2haang1

General information
- Location: Near Kam Tai Court, Ma On Shan Road, Tai Shui Hang; Sha Tin District, Hong Kong
- Coordinates: 22°24′32″N 114°13′23″E
- System: MTR rapid transit station
- Owner: KCR Corporation
- Operator: MTR Corporation
- Line: Tuen Ma line
- Platforms: 2 (1 island platform)
- Tracks: 2
- Connections: Bus, minibus

Construction
- Structure type: Elevated
- Accessible: yes

Other information
- Station code: TSH

History
- Opened: 21 December 2004; 21 years ago
- Former names: Fu On

Services
Preceding station	MTR	Following station
Shek Mun towards Tuen Mun	Tuen Ma line	Heng On towards Wu Kai Sha
Route map
Location
- Location within MTR

Tai Shui Hang (Chinese: 大水坑; Cantonese Yale: Daaihséuihāang) is an MTR station on the Tuen Ma line in Hong Kong. It serves residential estates including Kam Tai Court, Mountain Shore, Chevalier Garden and Sausalito, Tai Shui Hang Village and Sha Tin Fishermen's New Village. It also serves five kindergartens, primary and secondary schools. The pattern featured on the platform pillar and glass barrier is a shot of nature representing the Ma On Shan Country Park. For a period before the line opened, the station was known as "Fu On", since it is located opposite Chevalier Garden (transliterated from Chinese "Fu On Garden").

== History ==
On 21 December 2004, Tai Shui Hang station opened to the public with the other KCR Ma On Shan Rail stations.

On 14 February 2020, the Ma On Shan line was extended south to a new terminus in Kai Tak, as part of the first phase of the Shatin to Central Link Project. The Ma On Shan Line was renamed Tuen Ma Line Phase 1 at the time. Tai Shui Hang station became an intermediate station on this temporary new line.

On 27 June 2021, the Tuen Ma line Phase 1 officially merged with the West Rail line in East Kowloon to form the new Tuen Ma line, as part of the Shatin to Central link project. Hence, Tai Shui Hang was included in the project and is now an intermediate station on the Tuen Ma line, Hong Kong's longest railway line.

== Station layout ==
P	Platform 1	← Tuen Ma line towards Tuen Mun (Shek Mun)
P	Island platform, doors will open on the left
P	Platform 2	Tuen Ma line towards Wu Kai Sha (Heng On) →
C	Concourse	Customer services, toilets
C	Concourse	MTRShops, vending machines
S	Subway	Kam Tai Court and Chevalier Garden exits

Platforms 1 and 2 share the same island platform.

== Entrances/exits ==
- A: Kam Tai Court
- B: Chevalier Garden
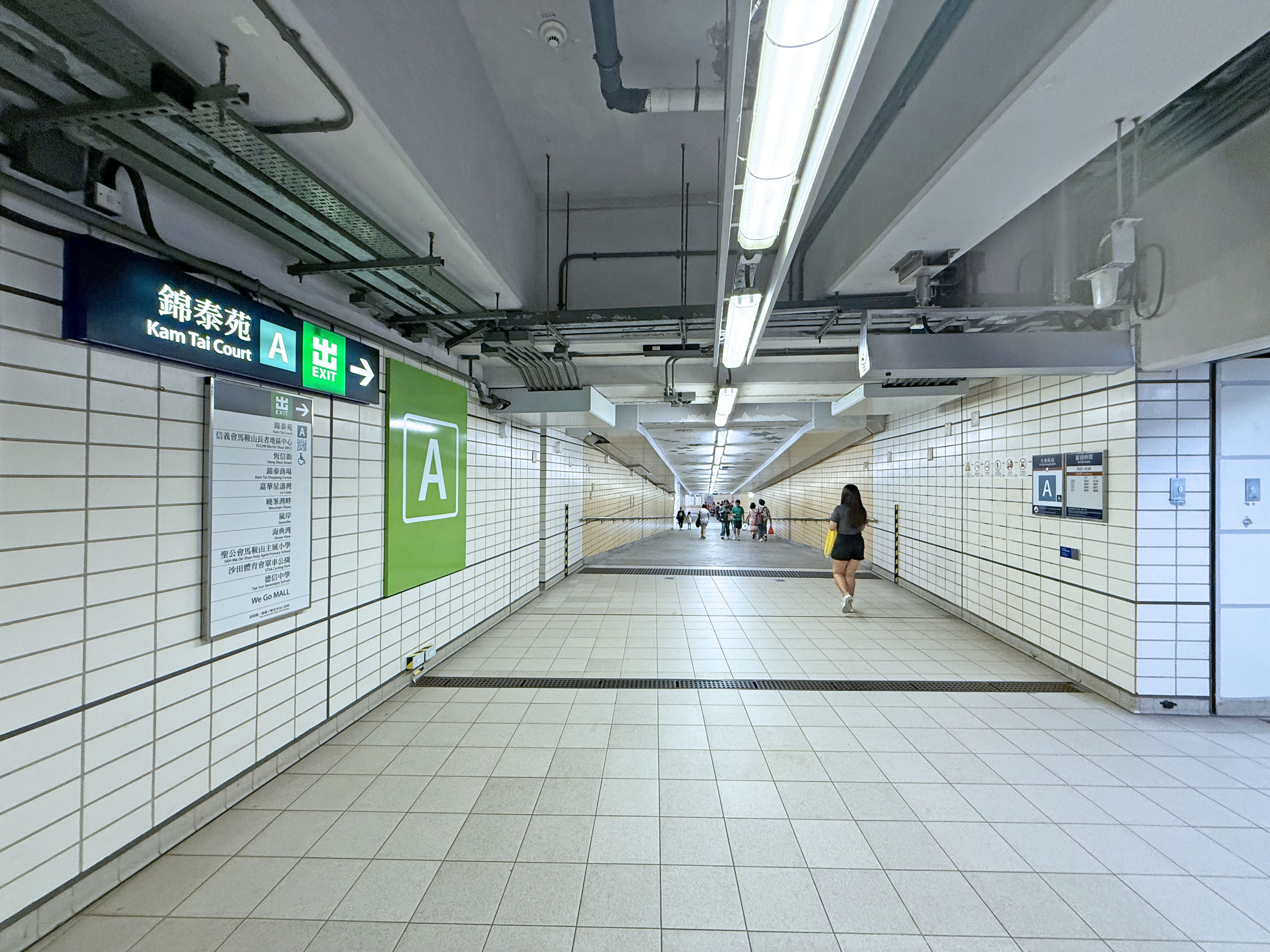
Exit A

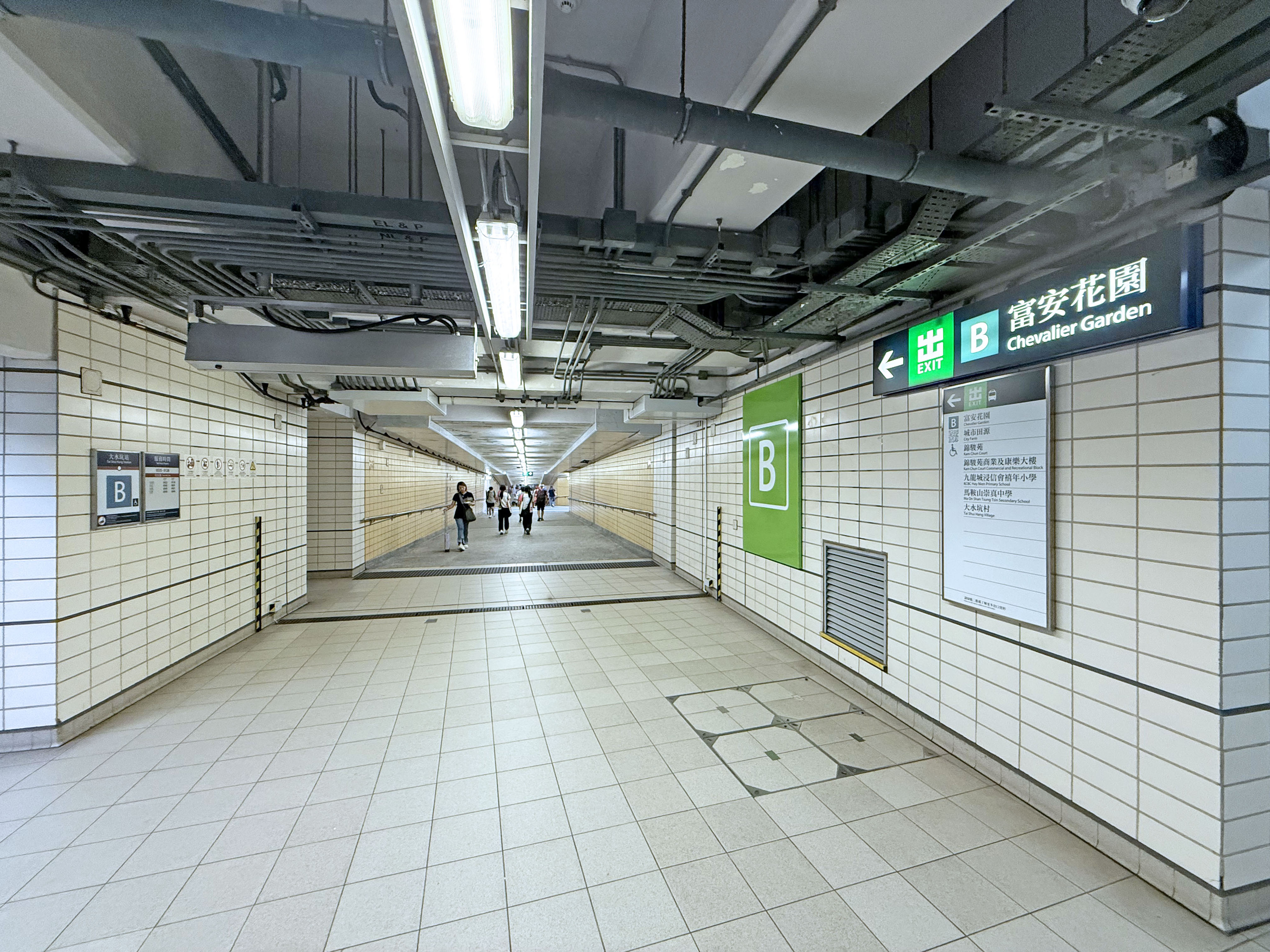
Exit B
