= Yiu On Estate =

Public housing estate in Ma On Shan, Hong Kong

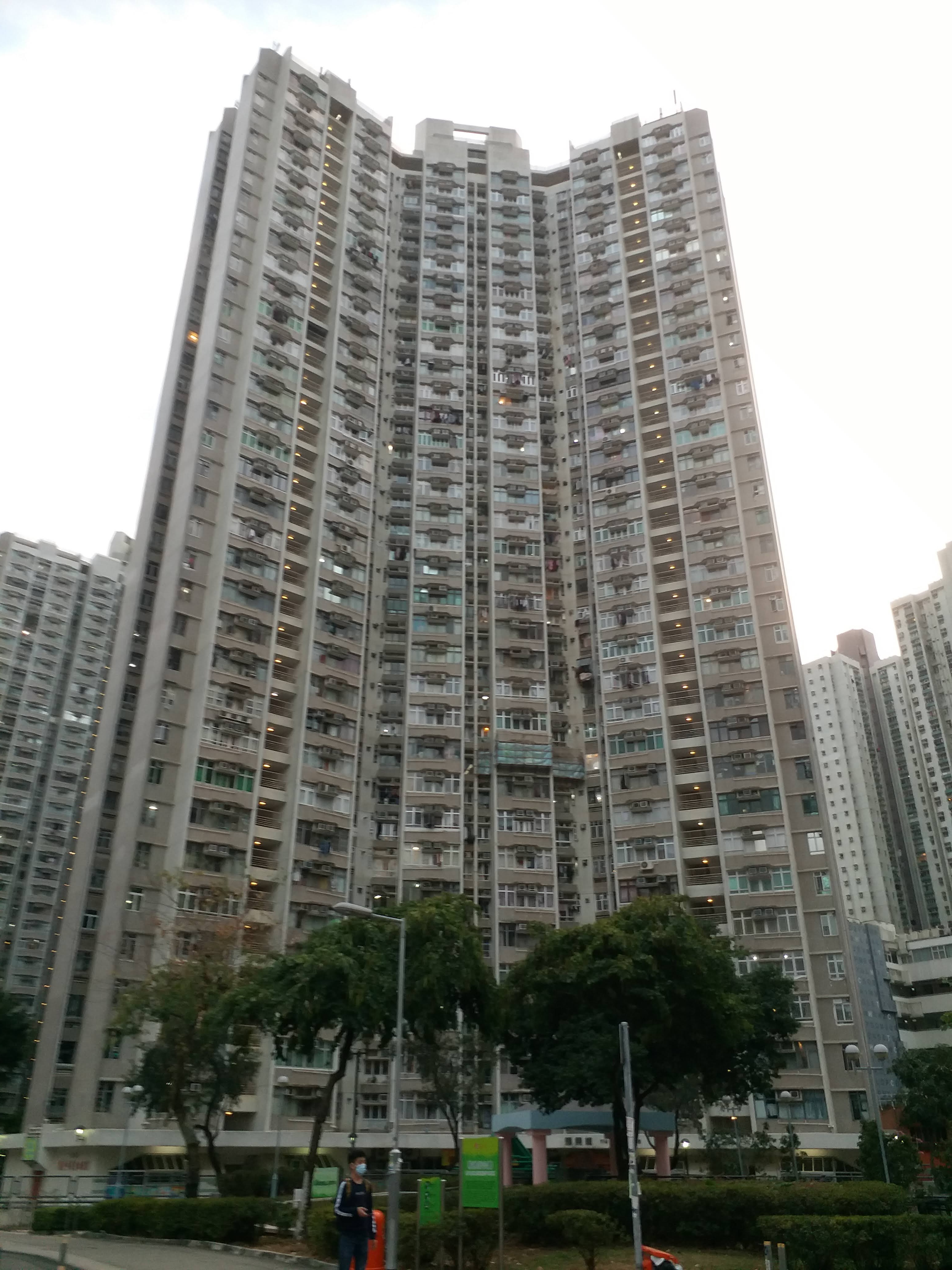
- Yiu Wing House of Yiu On Estate
- Interactive map of Yiu On Estate

General information
- Location: 2 Hang Hong Street, Ma On Shan; New Territories, Hong Kong
- Coordinates: 22.4191923°N 114.2305412°E
- Status: Completed
- Category: Public rental housing
- Population: 14,017 (2016)
- No. of blocks: 7
- No. of units: 1,367

Construction
- Constructed: 1988; 38 years ago
- Authority: Hong Kong Housing Authority

Yiu On Estate (Chinese: 耀安邨) is a public housing estate in Ma On Shan, New Territories, Hong Kong. It is the second public housing estate in Ma On Shan and has seven blocks built on the reclaimed land between Ma On Shan Road and Sai Sha Road in 1988. Some of the flats were sold to the tenants through Tenants Purchase Scheme Phase 2 in 1999.

Kam Hay Court (錦禧苑) is a Home Ownership Scheme court in Ma On Shan, near Yiu On Estate. It consists of three blocks built in 1989.

== Houses ==
=== Yiu On Estate ===
Name	Chinese name	Building type	Completed
Yiu Ping House	耀平樓	Trident 4	1988
Yiu Chung House	耀頌樓	Trident 4	1988
Yiu Yan House	耀欣樓	Trident 4	1988
Yiu Wing House	耀榮樓	Trident 4	1988
Yiu Shun House	耀遜樓	Trident 3	1988
Yiu Him House	耀謙樓	Trident 3	1988
Yiu Wo House	耀和樓	New Slab	1988

=== Kam Hay Court ===
Name	Chinese name	Building type	Completed
Kam Foon House	錦歡閣	NCB (Ver.1984)	1989
Kam Yan House	錦欣閣	NCB (Ver.1984)	1989
Kam Wing House	錦榮閣	NCB (Ver.1984)	1989

== Demographics ==
According to the 2016 by-census, Yiu On Estate had a population of 14,017 while Kam Hay Court had a population of 3,097. Altogether the population amounts to 17,114.

== Politics ==
Yiu On Estate and Kam Hay Court are located in Yiu On constituency of the Sha Tin District Council. It is currently represented by Kelvin Sin Cheuk-nam, who was elected in the 2019 elections.

== COVID-19 pandemic ==
Yiu Ping House of the estate was under lockdown for mandatory test between 16 & 18 February, 2022. At least 64 preliminary positive Covid cases was found.

== See also ==
- Public housing estates in Ma On Shan
