= Heng On station =

MTR station in the New Territories, Hong Kong

Heng On 恆安
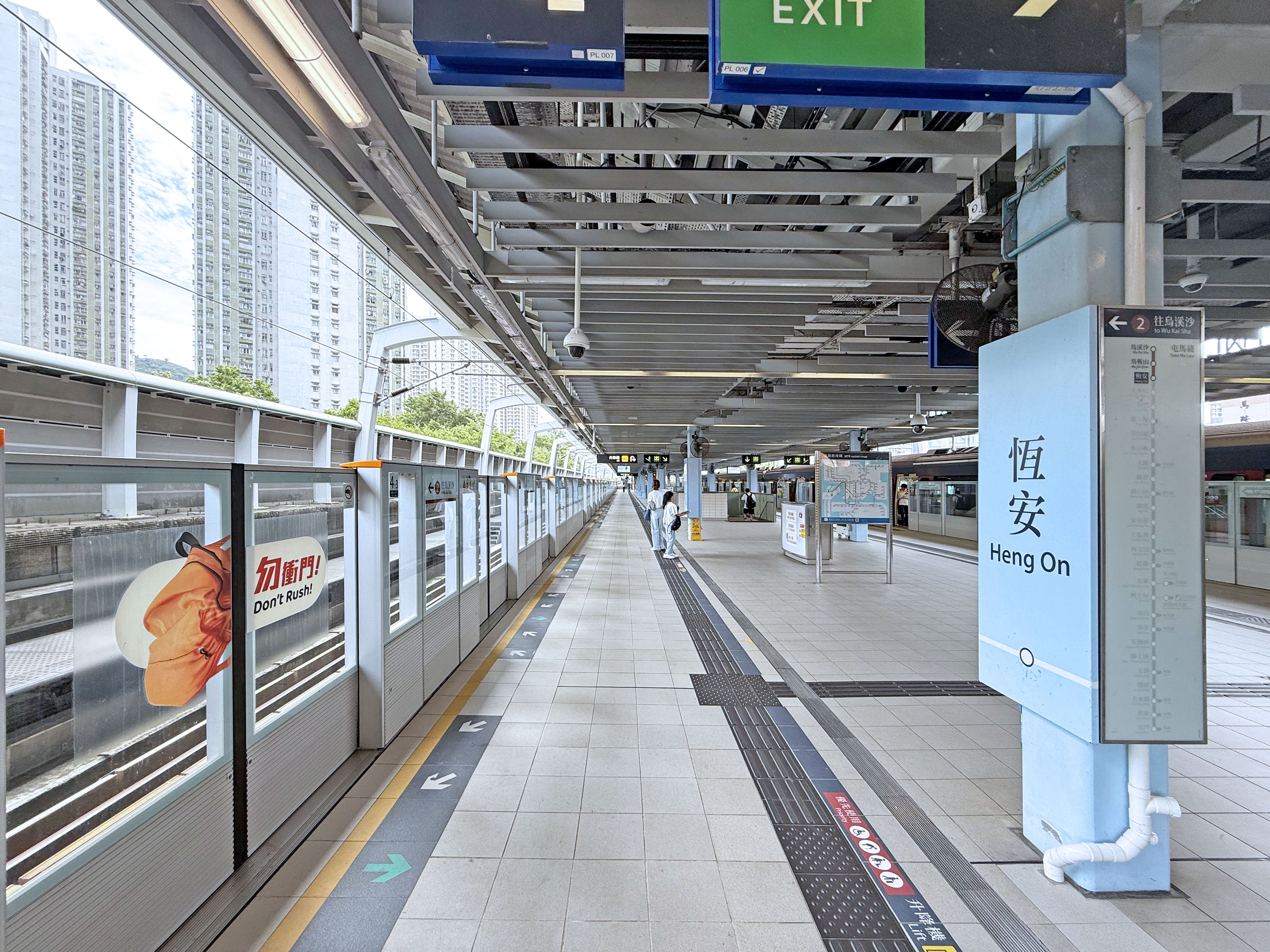
- Platform 2

Chinese name
- Traditional Chinese: 恆安
- Simplified Chinese: 恒安
- Cantonese Yale: Hàng'ōn
- Literal meaning: Lasting safe(ly)
Transcriptions
Standard Mandarin
- Hanyu Pinyin: Héng'ān
Yue: Cantonese
- Yale Romanization: Hàng'ōn
- Jyutping: Hang4on1

General information
- Location: Near Kam On Court, Sai Sha Road, Ma On Shan; Sha Tin District, Hong Kong
- Coordinates: 22°25′03″N 114°13′33″E
- System: MTR rapid transit station
- Owner: KCR Corporation
- Operator: MTR Corporation
- Line: Tuen Ma line
- Platforms: 2 (1 island platform)
- Tracks: 2

Construction
- Structure type: Elevated
- Accessible: yes

Other information
- Station code: HEO

History
- Opened: 21 December 2004; 21 years ago

Services
Preceding station	MTR	Following station
Tai Shui Hang towards Tuen Mun	Tuen Ma line	Ma On Shan towards Wu Kai Sha
Track layout
Location
- Location within MTR

Heng On (Chinese: 恆安; Cantonese Yale: Hàng'ōn) is a station on the Tuen Ma line of Hong Kong MTR, named after the nearby Heng On Estate. It also serves other residential areas like Kam Fung Court, Kam On Court, Baycrest, Vista Paradiso, and Yiu On Estate. It also serves over 10 schools (including Renaissance College) and two sports centres – Ma On Shan Sports Ground and Heng On Sports Centre.

The print featured on the platform pillars and glass barrier is of farmland which used to exist in the Ma On Shan area.

== History ==
The name of the station was formally announced by KCR Corporation in 2000. Heng On station opened along with the rest of the Ma On Shan line on 21 December 2004.

The platform was doubled in length in 2014 as part of the Sha Tin to Central Link, which will extend the Ma On Shan line trains from four cars to eight cars.

On 14 February 2020, the Ma On Shan line was extended south to a new terminus in Kai Tak, as part of the first phase of the Shatin to Central Link Project. The Ma On Shan Line was renamed Tuen Ma Line Phase 1 at the time. Heng On station became an intermediate station on this temporary new line.

On 27 June 2021, the Tuen Ma line Phase 1 officially merged with the West Rail line in East Kowloon to form the new Tuen Ma line, as part of the Shatin to Central link project. Hence, Heng On was included in the project and is now an intermediate station on the Tuen Ma line, Hong Kong's longest railway line.

== Station layout ==
P	Platform 1	← Tuen Ma line towards Tuen Mun (Tai Shui Hang)
P	Island platform, doors will open on the left
P	Platform 2	Tuen Ma line towards Wu Kai Sha (Ma On Shan) →
C	Concourse (ground level)	Exit C
C	Concourse (ground level)	Customer Service Centre, toilets, MTRShops
S	Subway	Customer Service Centre, exits A and B

Platforms 1 and 2 share the same island platform. There is a subway to Renaissance College using Exit A.

== Entrances/exits ==
- A: Vista Paradiso, Renaissance College
- B: Heng On Estate, Yiu On Estate
- C: Kam Fung Court, Chung On Estate, Chung On Shpooing Centre
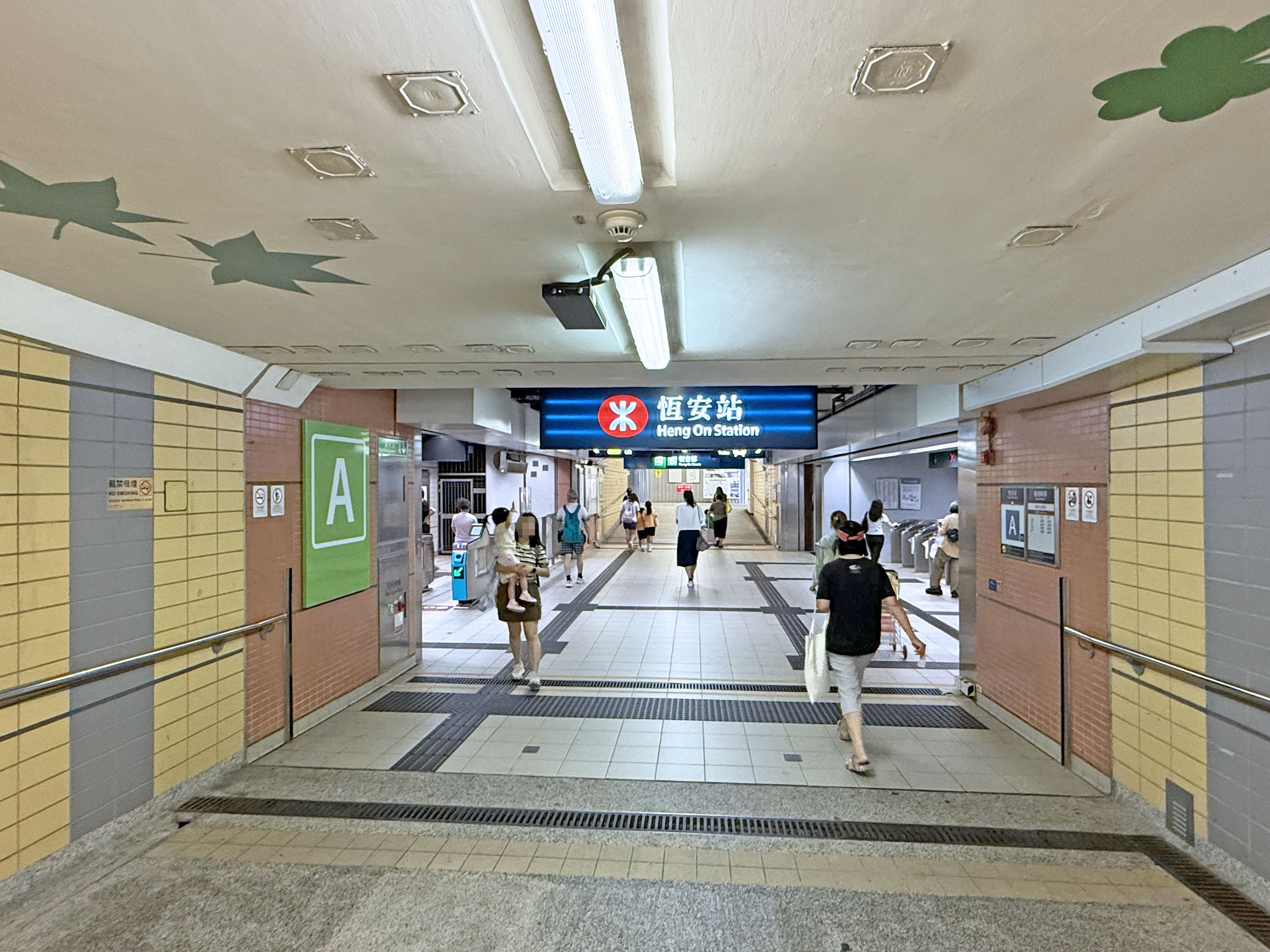
Exit A

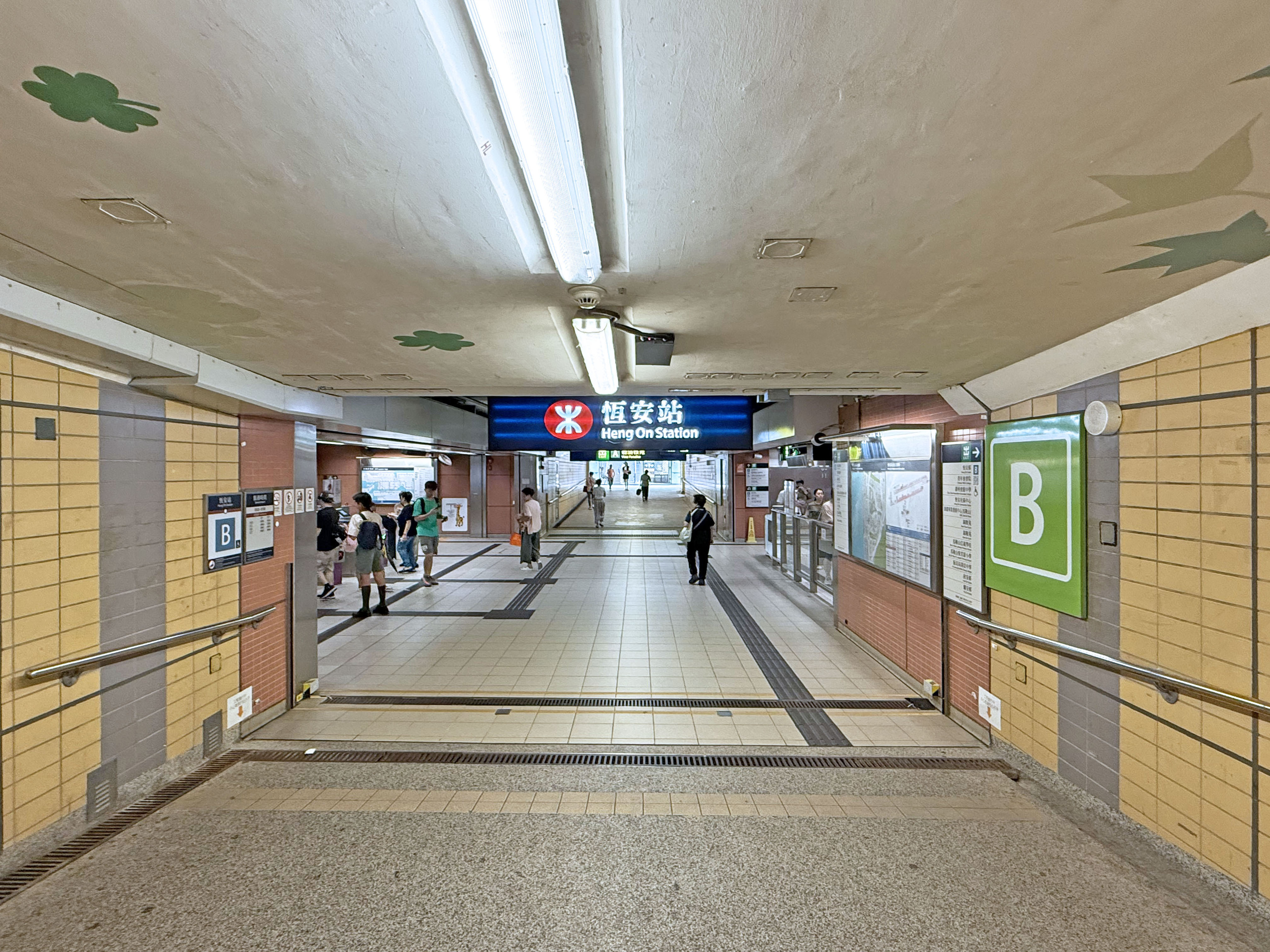
Exit B

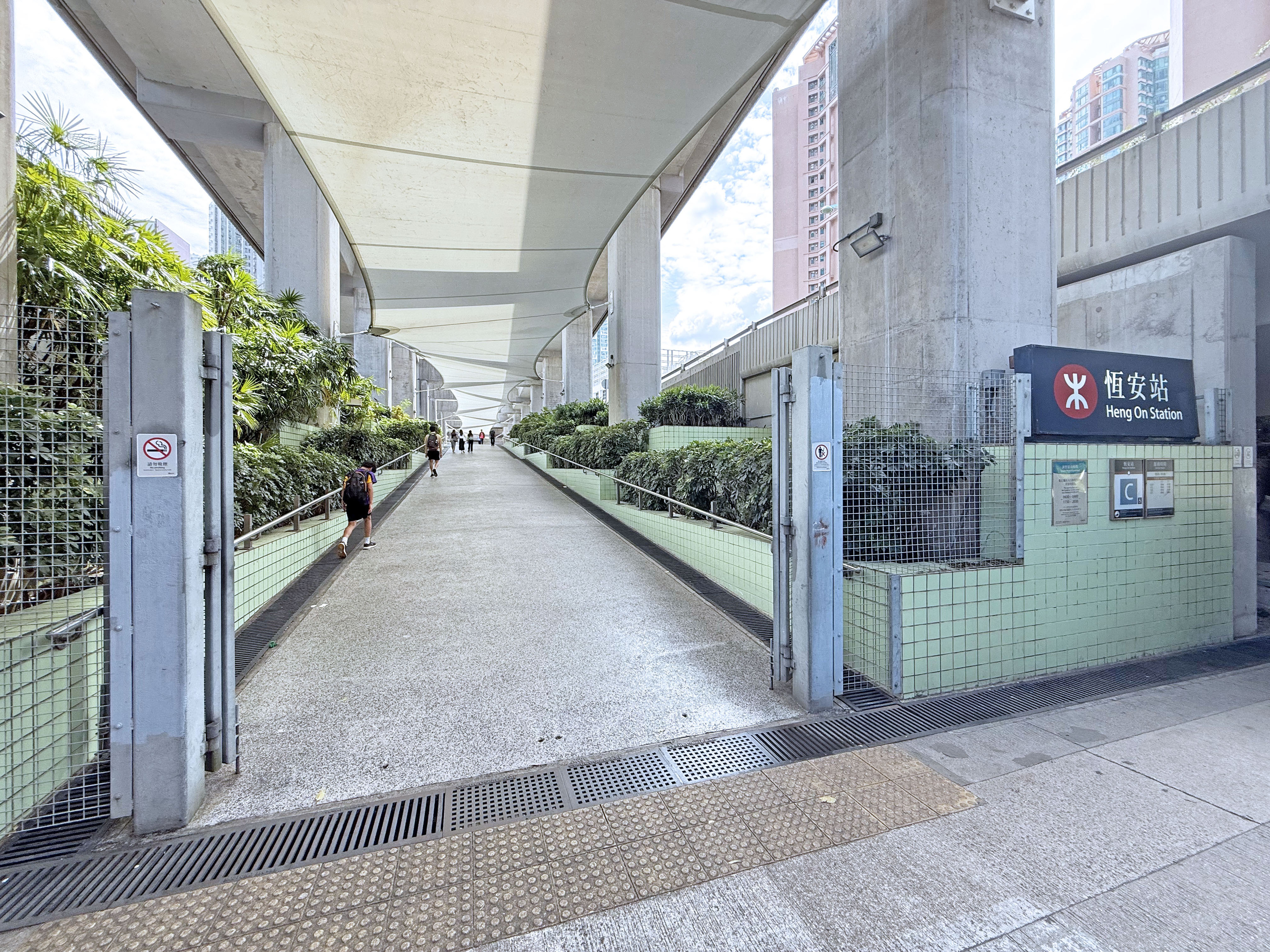
Exit C
