= Public housing estates in Ma On Shan =

Public housing in Hong Kong

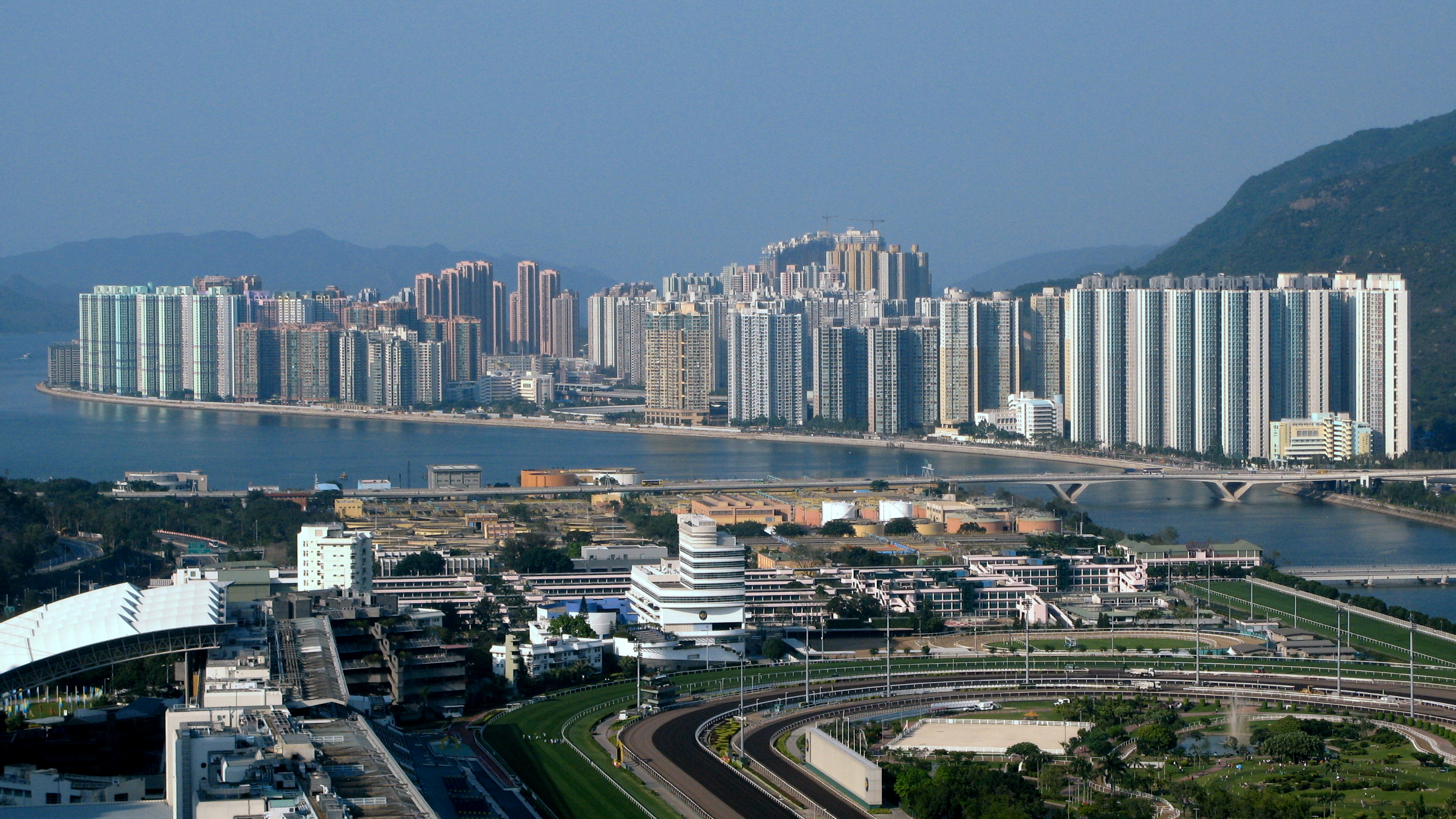
Ma On Shan skyline, formed by a mix of public and private housing estates.

The following is a list of Public housing estates in Ma On Shan, Hong Kong, including Home Ownership Scheme (HOS), Private Sector Participation Scheme (PSPS), Sandwich Class Housing Scheme (SCHS), Flat-for-Sale Scheme (FFSS), and Tenants Purchase Scheme (TPS) estates.

== Overview ==
Name		Type	Inaug.	No Blocks	No Units	Notes
Chevalier Garden	富安花園	PSPS	1987	17	3,942	
Chung On Estate	頌安邨	Public	1996	5	2,834	
Fu Fai Garden	富輝花園	PSPS	1991	2	520	
Fok On Garden	福安花園	PSPS	1992	2	600	
Heng On Estate	恆安邨	TPS	1987	7	1,319	
Kam Chun Court	錦駿苑	HOS	2023	5	2,069	
Kam Fai Court	錦暉苑	HOS	2020	1	735	
Kam Fung Court	錦豐苑	HOS	1996	9	3,648	
Kam Hay Court	錦禧苑	HOS	1989	3	1,050	
Kam Lung Court	錦龍苑	HOS	1993	4	1,400	
Kam On Court	錦鞍苑	HOS	1987	3	1,050	
Kam Pak Court	錦柏苑	HOS	2026	3	1,896	
Kam Tai Court	錦泰苑	HOS	2000	12	3,440	
Kam Ying Court	錦英苑	HOS	1991	10	3,500	
Lee On Estate	利安邨	Public	1993	5	3,632	
Park Belvedere	雅景臺	Sandwich	1998	4	992	HK Housing Society
Saddle Ridge Garden	富寶花園	PSPS	1993	12	4,200	
Yan On Estate	欣安邨	Public	2011	3	2,587	
Yiu On Estate	耀安邨	TPS	1988	7	1,367	

== Chevalier Garden ==
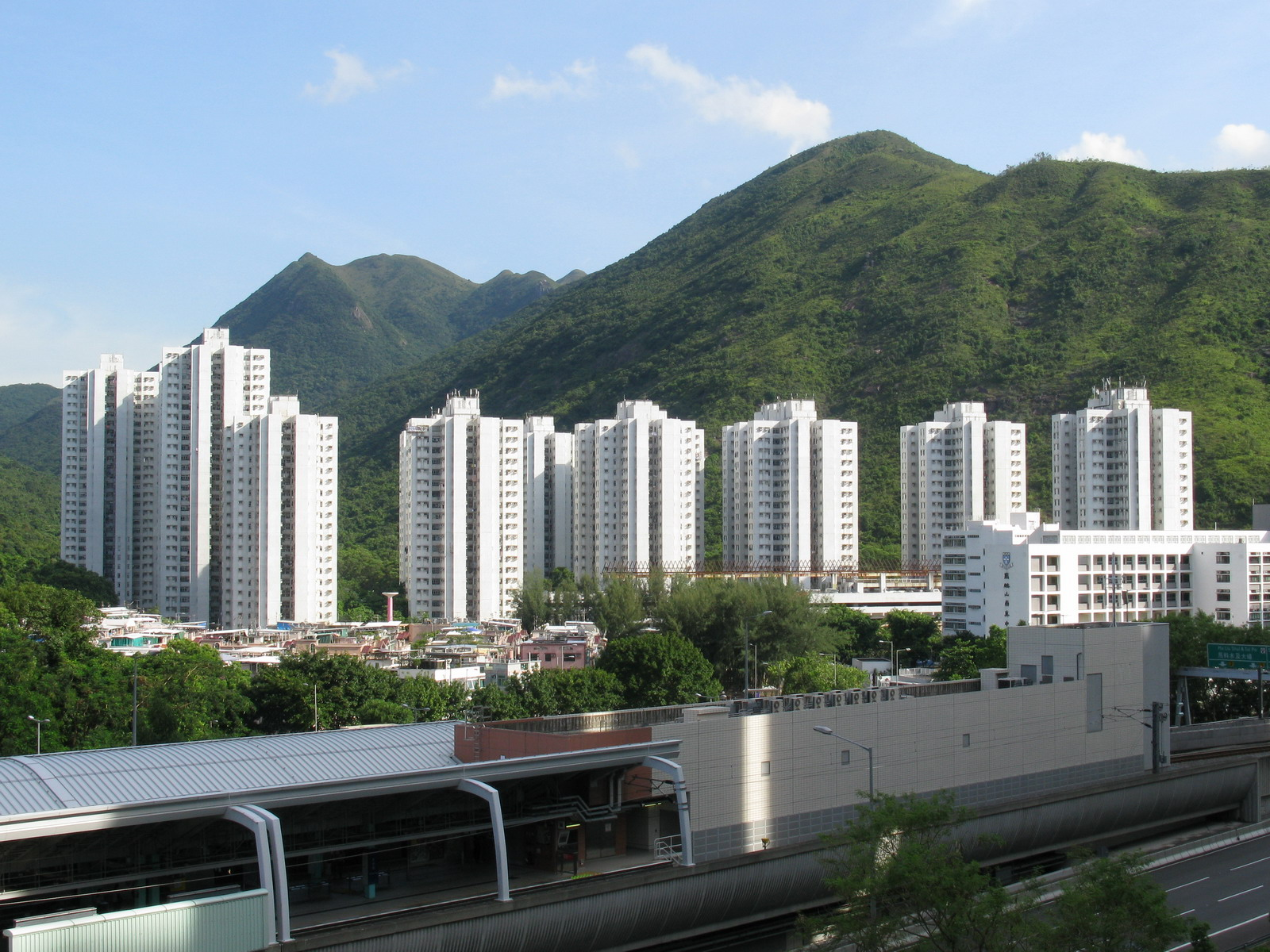
Chevalier Garden and MTR Tai Shui Hang station

Chevalier Garden (Chinese: 富安花園) is a HOS and PSPS court in Ma On Shan, next to MTR Tai Shui Hang station. It was jointly developed by the Hong Kong Housing Authority and Chevalier Group, and it was the first HOS court developed by Chevalier Group. It has totally 17 blocks built between 1987 and 1988.

Name	Type	Completion
Block 1	PSPS	1987
Block 2	PSPS	1987
Block 3	PSPS	1987
Block 4	PSPS	1987
Block 5	PSPS	1987
Block 6	PSPS	1987
Block 7	PSPS	1987
Block 8	PSPS	1987
Block 9	PSPS	1987
Block 10	PSPS	1987
Block 11	PSPS	1988
Block 12	PSPS	1988
Block 13	PSPS	1988
Block 14	PSPS	1988
Block 15	PSPS	1988
Block 16	PSPS	1988
Block 17	PSPS	1988

== Chung On Estate ==
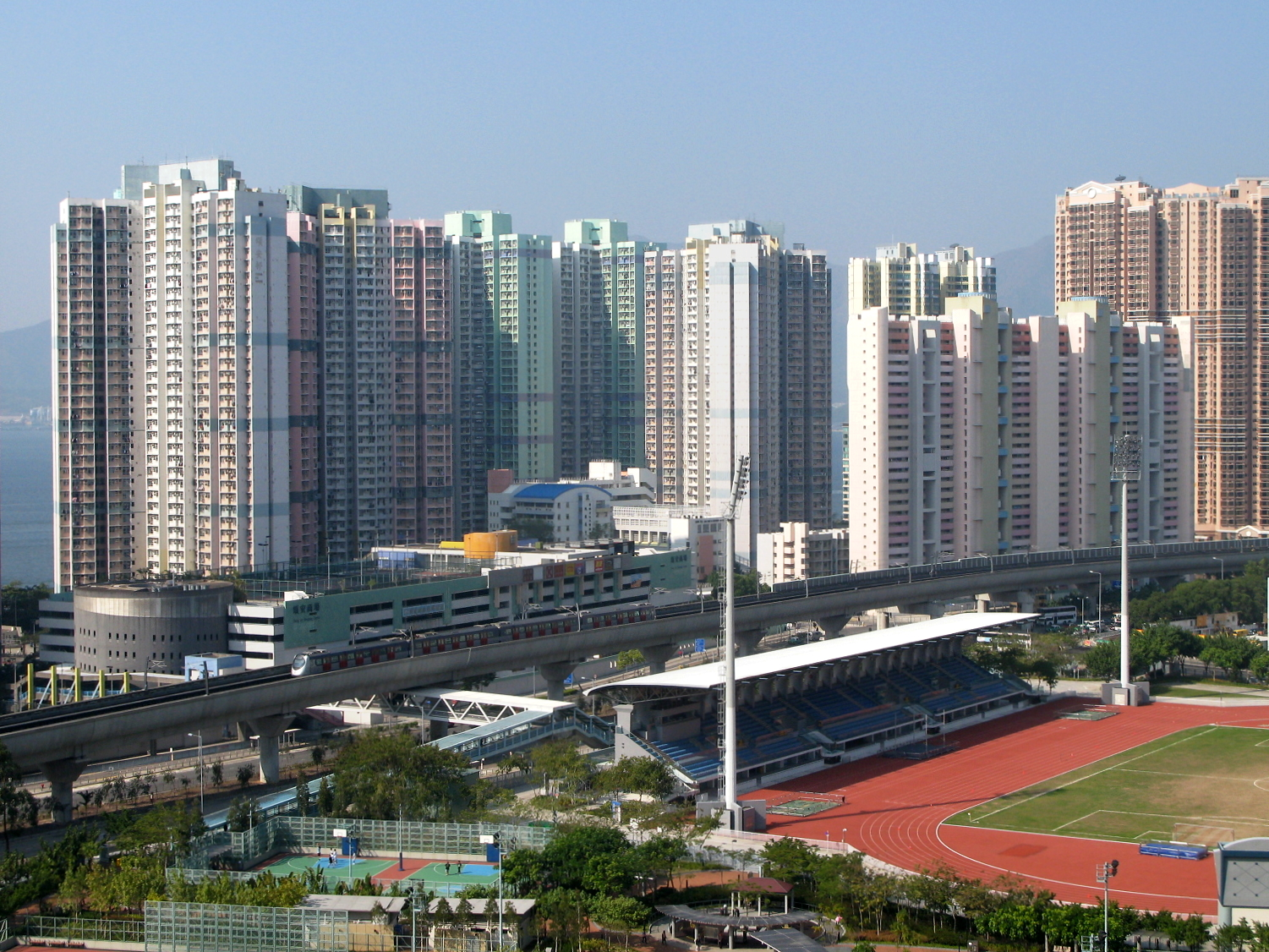
Chung On Estate

Chung On Estate (Chinese: 頌安邨) is the fourth public housing estate in Ma On Shan. It is built on the reclaimed land approaching Sha Tin Hoi and Tolo Harbour. It consists of 5 residential blocks completed between 1996 and 2001, offering a total of 3,000 units. Besides, there is a shopping mall (Chung On Shopping Centre) inside of the housing estate.

Name	Type	Completion
Chung Tak House	Harmony 2	1996
Chung Kwan House	Harmony 2	1998
Chung Chi House	Harmony 2	2001
Chung Ping House	Small Household Block	1999
Chung Wo House	Single Aspect Building	2000

Chung Wo House was placed under lockdown for mandatory covid-test on 21 February 2022. Chung Kwan House was sealed on 22 February.

== Fok On Garden ==
Fok On Garden (Chinese: 福安花園) is a HOS and PSPS court on the reclaimed land in Ma On Shan Town Centre, near MTR Ma On Shan station. It has 2 blocks built in 1992.

Name	Type	Completion
Block 1	PSPS	1992
Block 2	PSPS	1992

== Fu Fai Garden ==
Fu Fai Garden (Chinese: 富輝花園) is a HOS and PSPS court on the reclaimed land in Ma On Shan Town Centre, near MTR Ma On Shan station. Jointly developed by the Hong Kong Housing Authority and CCECC (HK), the court has two blocks built in 1992.

Name	Type	Completion
Block 1	PSPS	1992
Block 2	PSPS	1992

== Heng On Estate ==
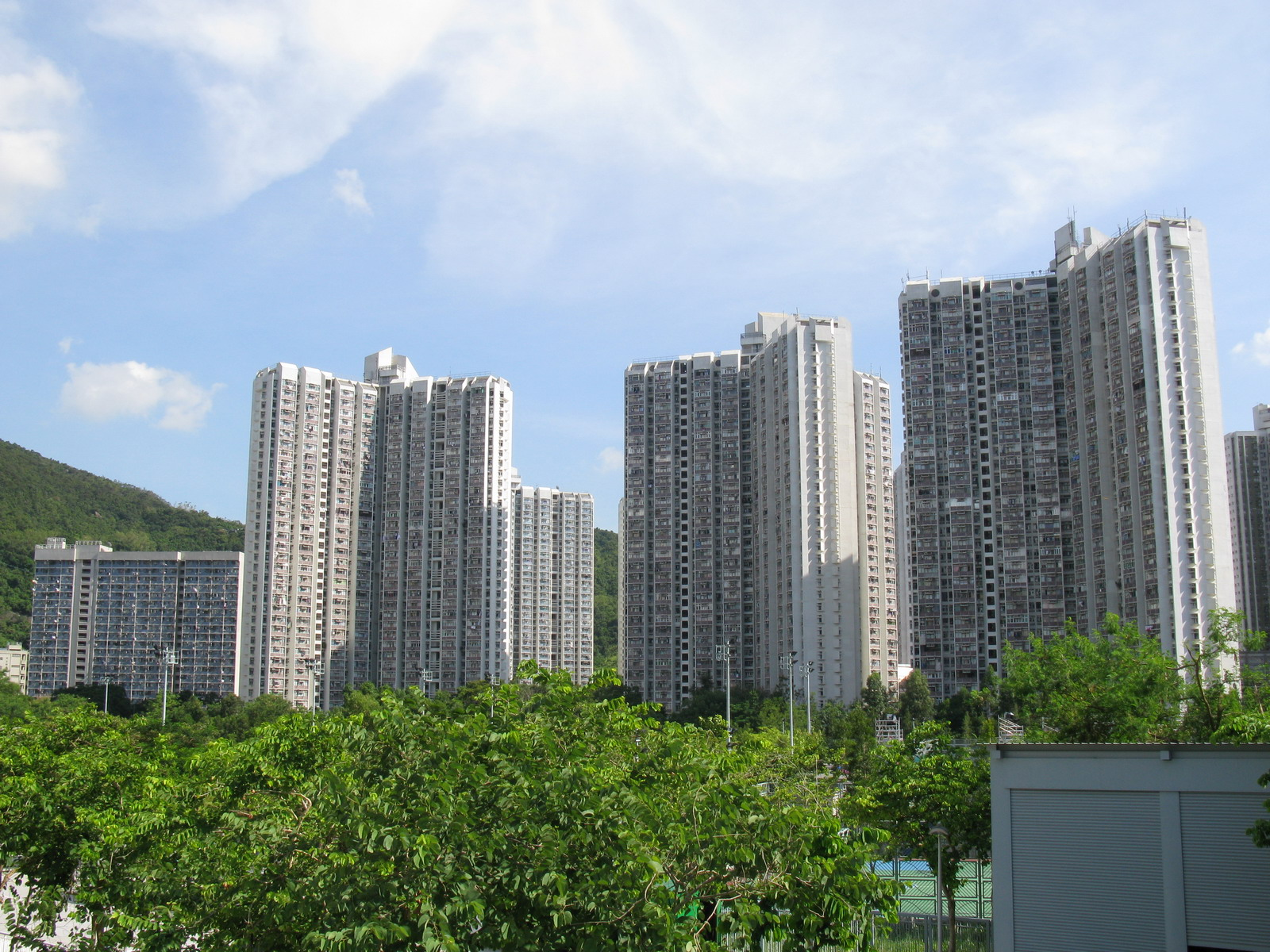
Heng On Estate

Heng On Estate (Chinese: 恆安邨) is the first public housing estate in Ma On Shan. It consists of seven residential buildings completed in 1987. It is a mixed estate built on reclaimed land between Ma On Shan Road and Sai Sha Road. Some of the flats were sold to the tenants through Tenants Purchase Scheme Phase 1 in 1998. The Heng On Estate Commercial Centre and Central Garden received a Certificate of Merit at the 1989 Hong Kong Institute of Architects Annual Awards.

Name	Type	Completion
Heng Kong House	New Slab	1987
Heng Shan House	Trident 3	1987
Heng Fung House	Trident 3	1987
Heng Hoi House	Trident 3	1987
Heng Yat House	Trident 3	1987
Heng Yuet House	Trident 3	1987
Heng Sing House	Trident 3	1987

Heng Kong House was put under lockdown for mandatory covid testing between 5 & 6 February 2021. Heng Fung House was sealed on 22 February 2022.

== Kam Chun Court ==
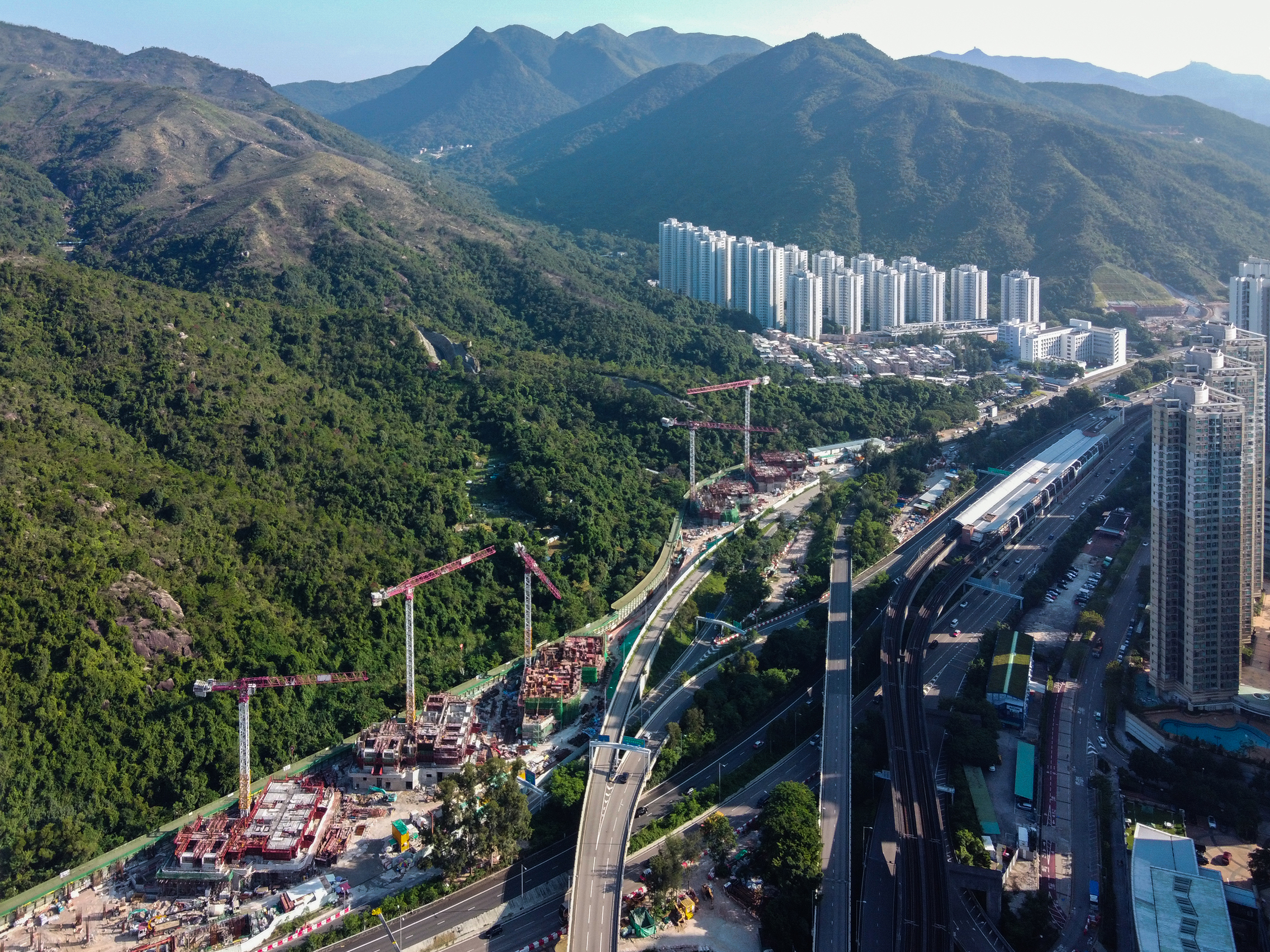
Kam Chun Court construction site

Kam Chun Court (Chinese: 錦駿苑) is a HOS court under construction along Ma On Shan Road, Ma On Shan. Formerly the site of Tai Shui Hang Bicycle Park, the court comprises 5 blocks with totally 2,069 units. It is expected to complete in 2023.

== Kam Fai Court ==
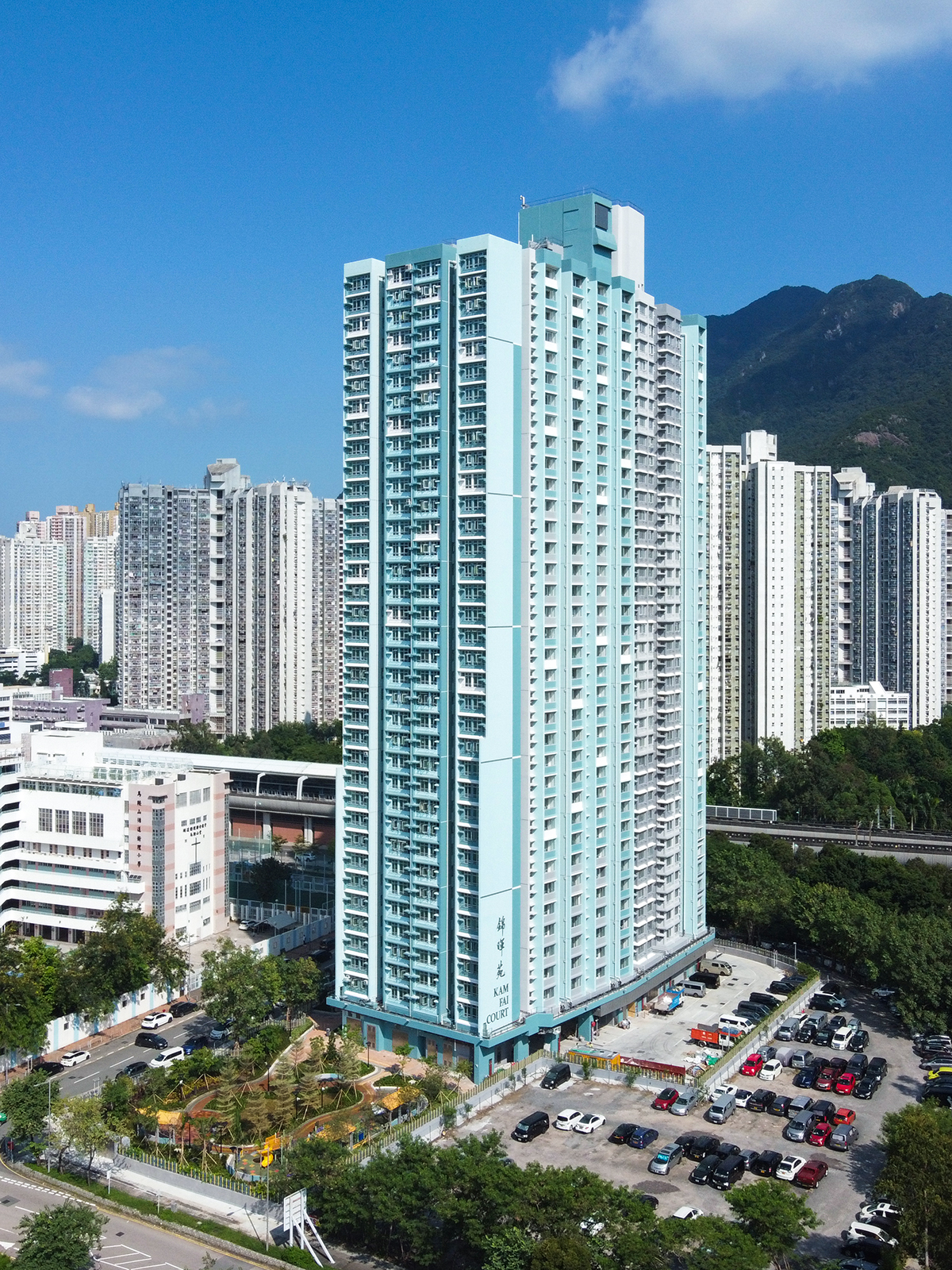
Kam Fai Court

Kam Fai Court (Chinese: 錦暉苑) is a HOS court in Hang Kin Street, Ma On Shan, near MTR Heng On station, Heng On Estate and Oceanaire. It comprises one 37-storey block with 735 units. It is expected to complete in 2020.

Name	Type	Completion
Kam Fai Court	Non-standard	2020

== Kam Fung Court ==
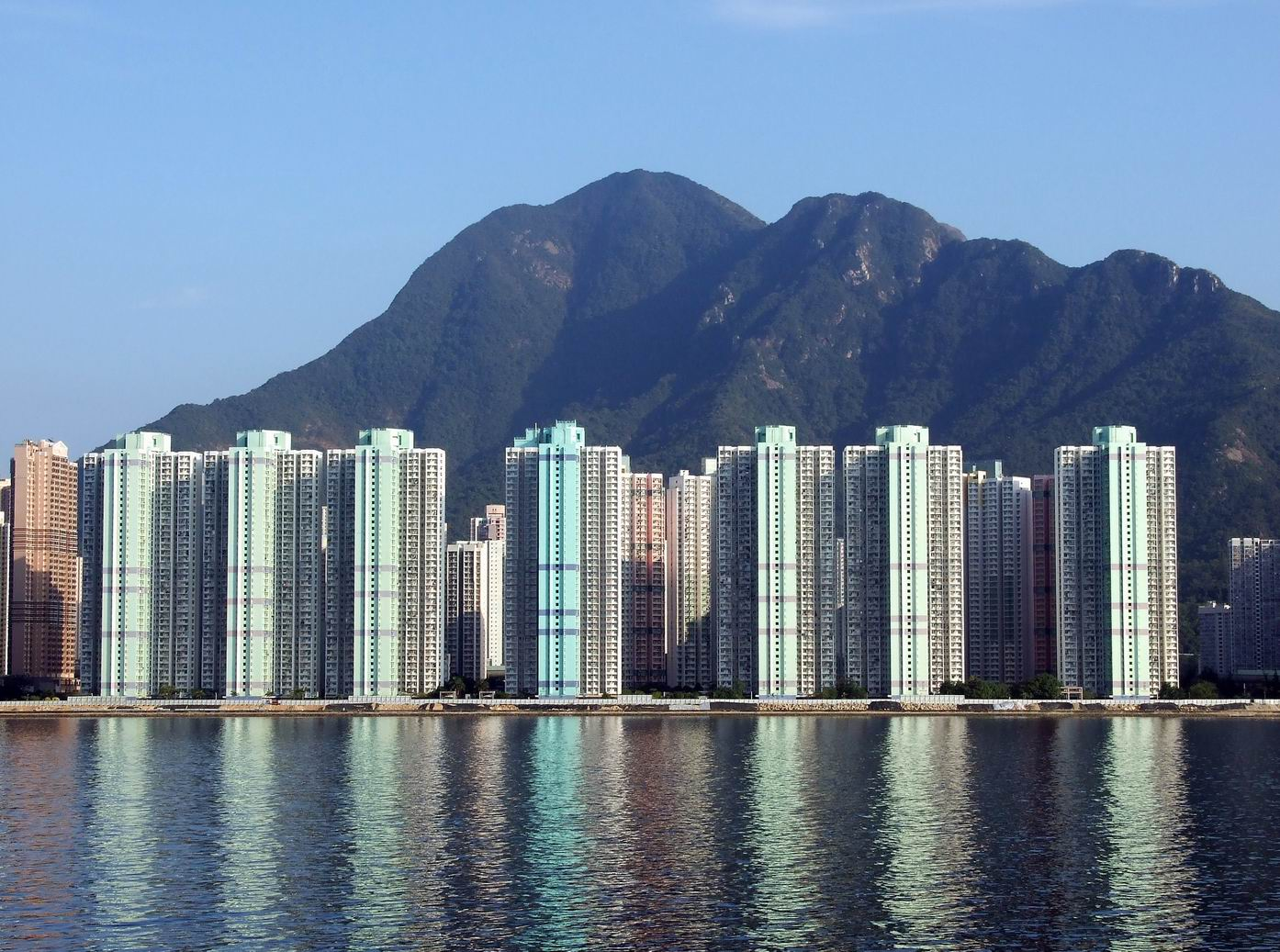
Kam Fung Court

Kam Fung Court (Chinese: 錦豐苑) is a HOS court in Ma On Shan, built on the reclaimed land along Tide Cove shoreline. It has totally nine blocks built in 1996. However, three of the blocks, Kam Lei House, Kam Ho House and Kam Lan House, were unsold until the sales of surplus HOS flats Phase 3 and 4 in 2008. In the late 1990s, Kam Fung Court suffered from serious subsidence problem on its newly reclaimed land.

Name	Type	Completion
Kam Yung House	Harmony 1	1996
Kam Ling House	Harmony 1	1996
Kam Wai House	Harmony 1	1996
Kam Lei House	Harmony 1	2002
Kam Kwai House	Harmony 1	1997
Kam Huen House	Harmony 1	1997
Kam Mei House	Harmony 1	1997
Kam Ho House	Harmony 2	2002
Kam Lan House	Harmony 2	2002

== Kam Hay Court ==
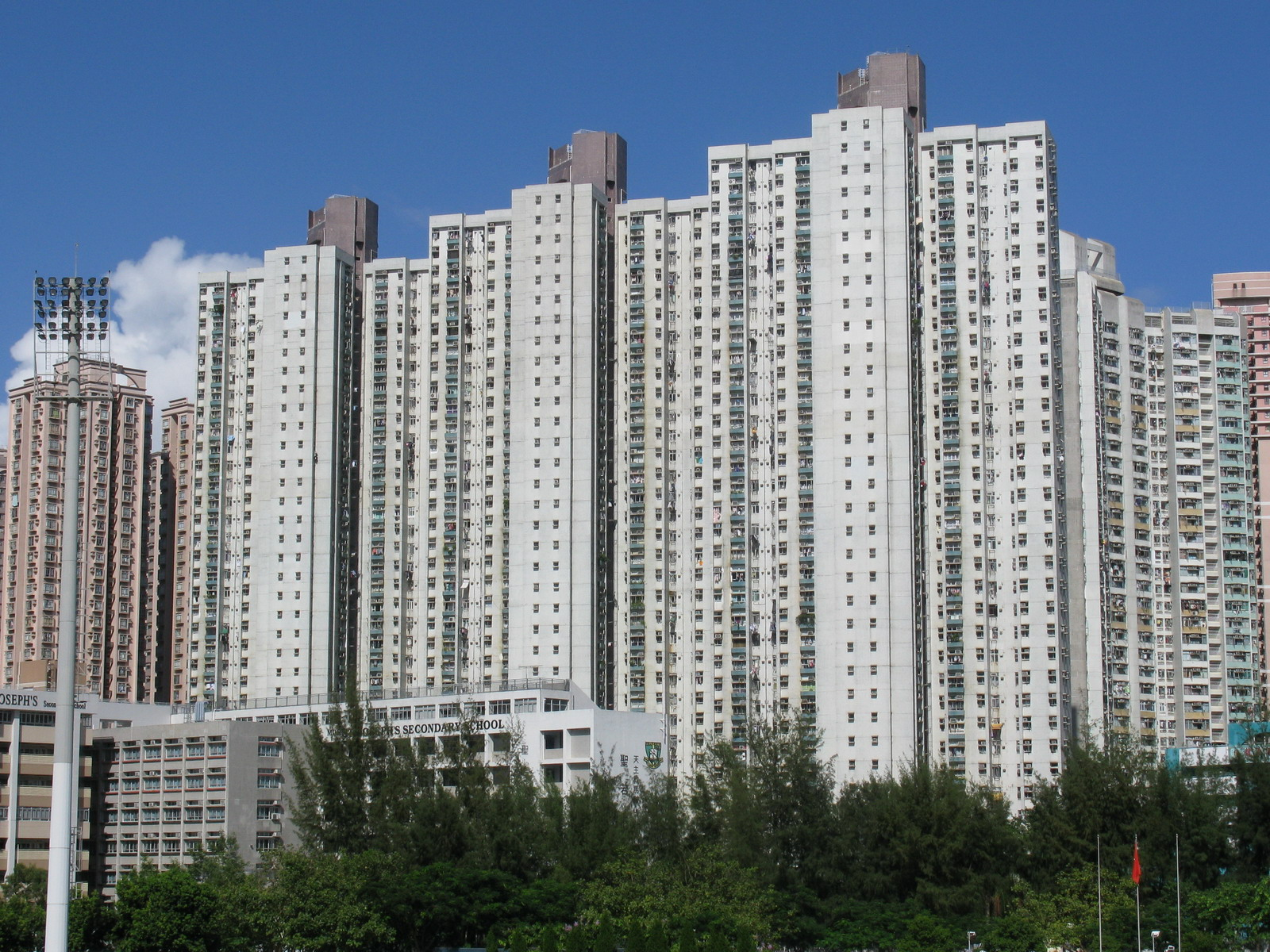
Kam Hay Court

Kam Hay Court (Chinese: 錦禧苑) is a HOS court on the reclaimed land in Ma On Shan, near Yiu On Estate. It has three blocks built in 1989.

Name	Type	Completion
Kam Foon House	NCB (Ver.1984)	1989
Kam Yan House	NCB (Ver.1984)	1989
Kam Wing House	NCB (Ver.1984)	1989

== Kam Lung Court ==
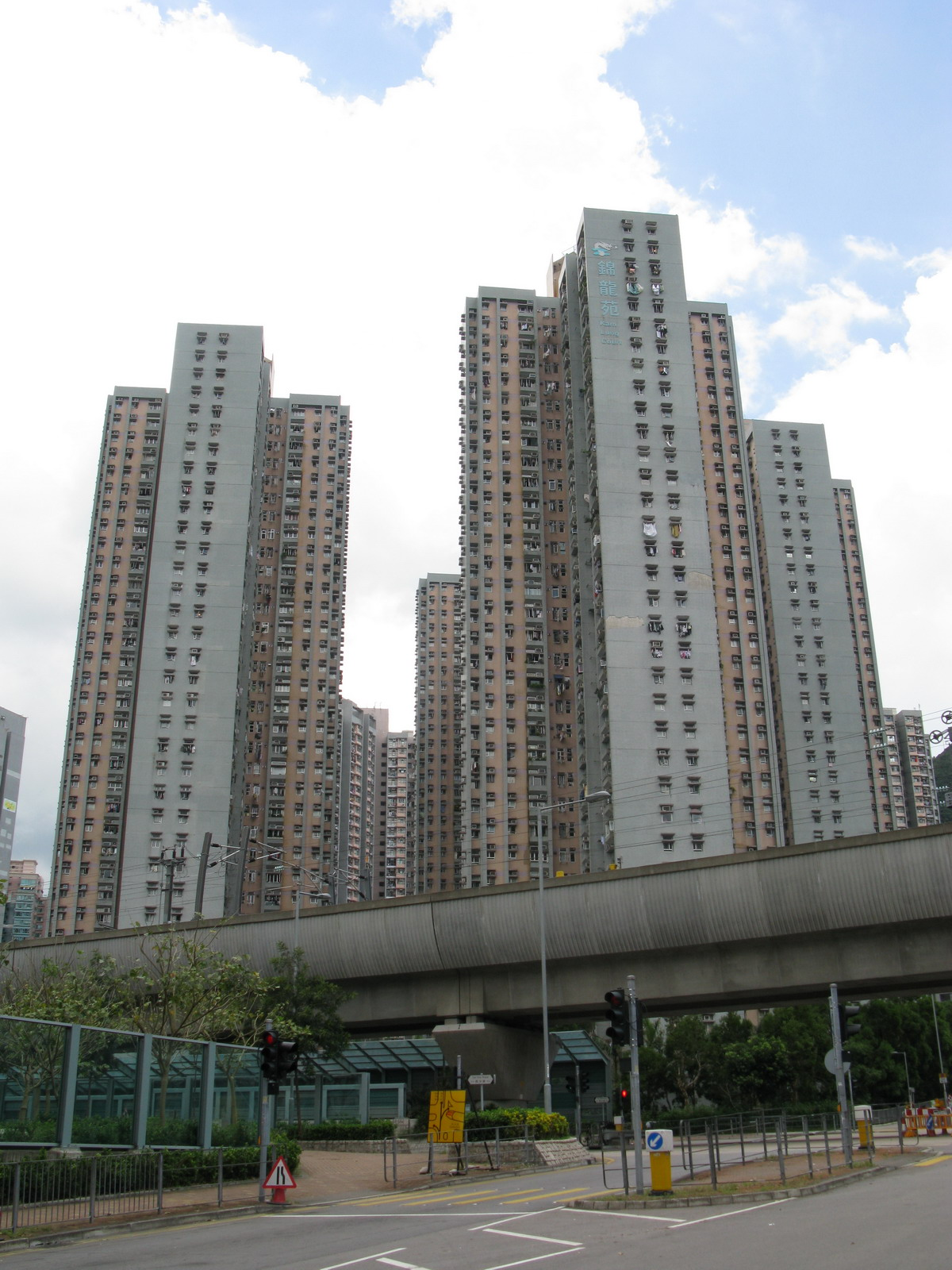
Kam Lung Court

Kam Lung Court (Chinese: 錦龍苑) is a HOS court next to Lee On Estate. It has totally four blocks built in 1993.

Name	Type	Completion
Lung Yuet House	NCB (Ver.1984)	1993
Lung Yan House	NCB (Ver.1984)	1993
Lung Yiu House	NCB (Ver.1984)	1993
Lung Sing House	NCB (Ver.1984)	1993

== Kam On Court ==
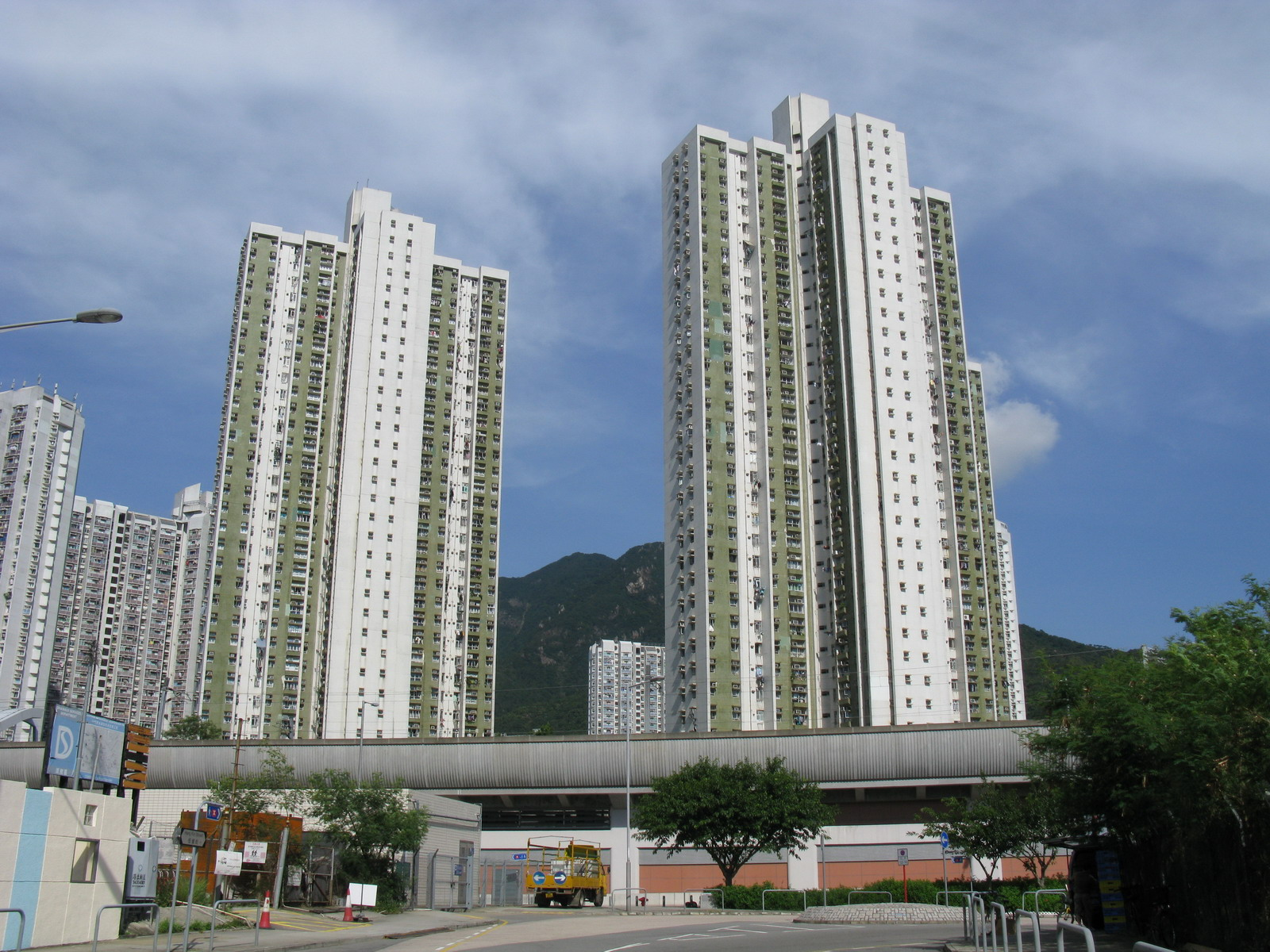
Kam On Court

Kam On Court (Chinese: 錦鞍苑) is a HOS court on the reclaimed land in Ma On Shan, next to Heng On Estate and MTR Heng On station. It has three blocks built in 1987.

Name	Type	Completion
Yuk On House	NCB (Ver.1984)	1987
Ngan On House	NCB (Ver.1984)	1987
Po On House	NCB (Ver.1984)	1987

== Kam Pak Court ==
Kam Pak Court

Kam Pak Court (Chinese: 錦柏苑) is a HOS court next to Yan On Estate and MTR Heng On station. It has three blocks built in 2026.

Name	Type	Completion
Pak Foon House	Non-Standard Block	2026
Pak Yuet House	Non-Standard Block	2026
Pak Hong House	Non-Standard Block	2026

== Kam Tai Court ==
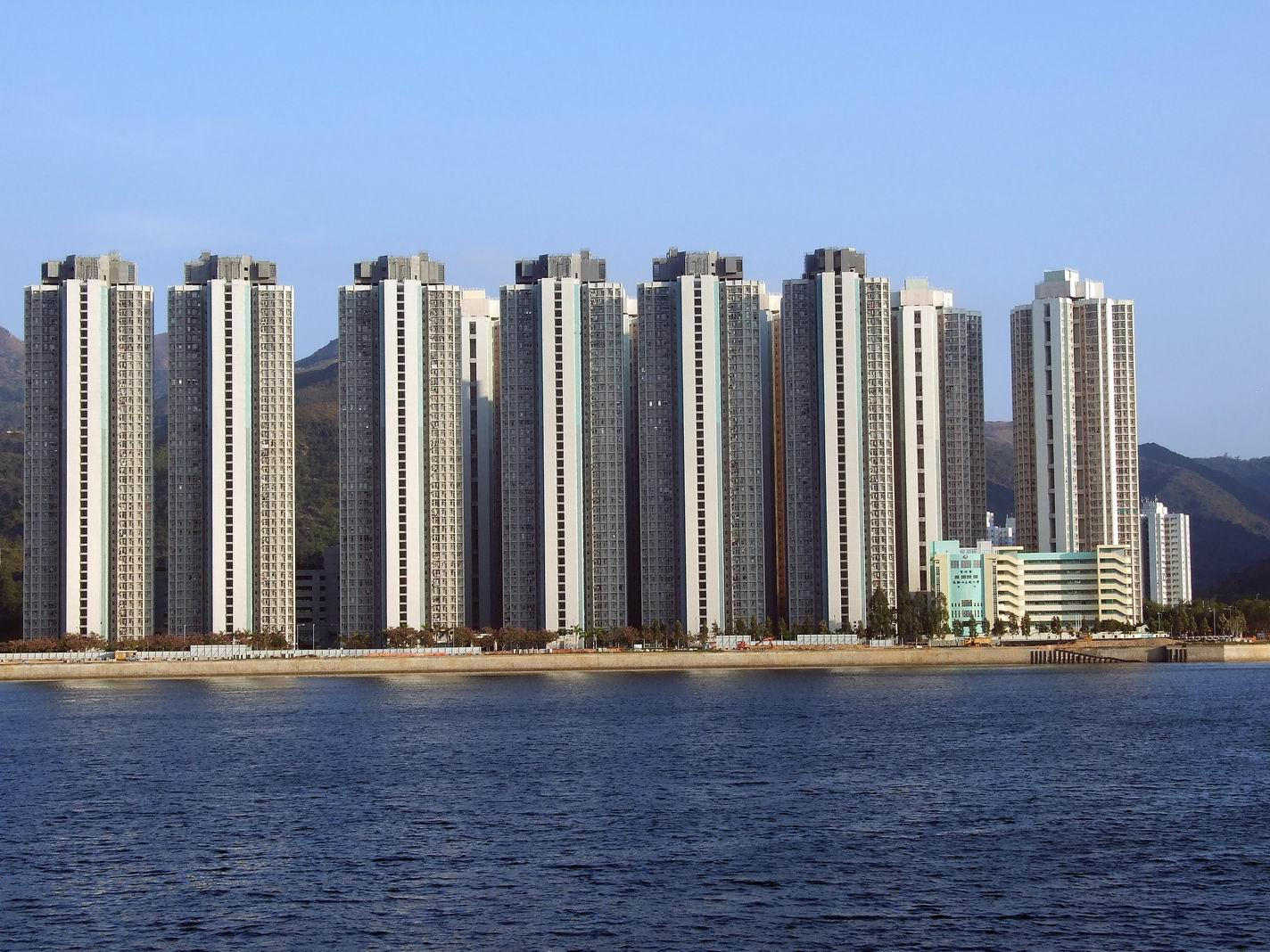
Kam Tai Court

Kam Tai Court (Chinese: 錦泰苑) is a HOS court in Ma On Shan, built on the reclaimed land along Tide Cove shoreline, near MTR Tai Shui Hang station. It has totally 12 blocks completed in 2000. Besides, there is a shopping mall (Kam Tai Shopping Centre) inside of the housing estate.

Name	Type	Completion
Kam Fu House	Concord 1	2000
Kam Pong House	Concord 1	2000
Kam Hing House	Concord 1	2000
Kam Shing House	Concord 1	2000
Kam Wei House	Concord 1	2000
Kam Lai House	Concord 1	2000
Kam Ching House	Concord 1	2000
Kam Ying House	Single Aspect Concord	2000
Kam Tin House	Single Aspect Concord	2000
Kam Pui House	Single Aspect Concord	2000
Kam Man House	Single Aspect Concord	2000
Kam Kei House	Single Aspect Concord	2000

== Kam Ying Court ==
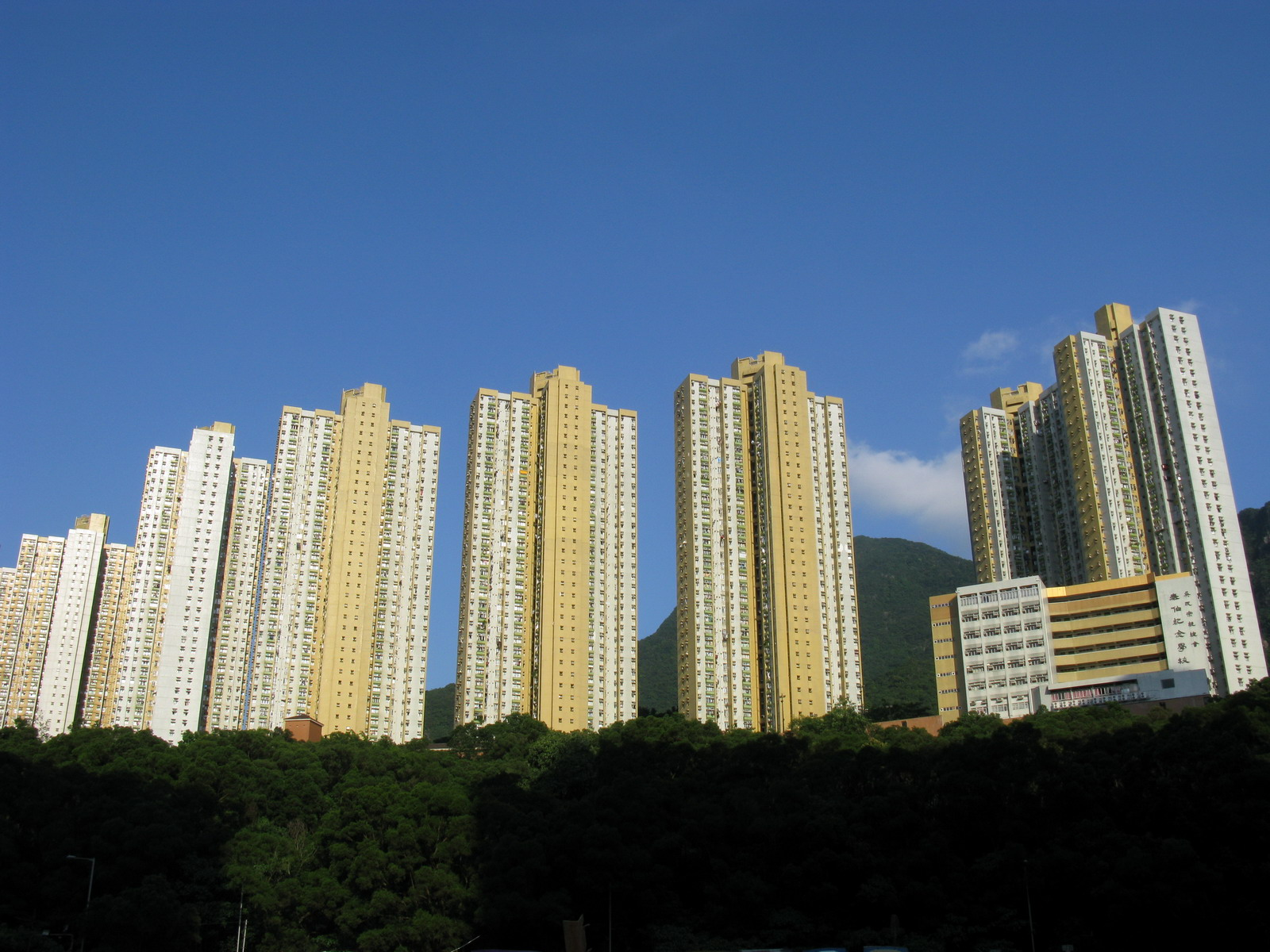
Kam Ying Court

Kam Ying Court (Chinese: 錦英苑) is a HOS court. It has totally 10 blocks built at a hill called Ma On Terrace (or Saddle Ridge Terrace) (Chinese: 馬鞍台) and was completed in 1991.

Name	Type	Completion
Kam Leung House	NCB (Ver.1984)	1991
Kam Kai House	NCB (Ver.1984)	1991
Kam Keung House	NCB (Ver.1984)	1991
Kam Chi House	NCB (Ver.1984)	1991
Kam Dat House	NCB (Ver.1984)	1991
Kam Shun House	NCB (Ver.1984)	1991
Kam Yuet House	NCB (Ver.1984)	1991
Kam Nga House	NCB (Ver.1984)	1991
Kam Yiu House	NCB (Ver.1984)	1991
Kam Yee House	NCB (Ver.1984)	1991

== Lee On Estate ==
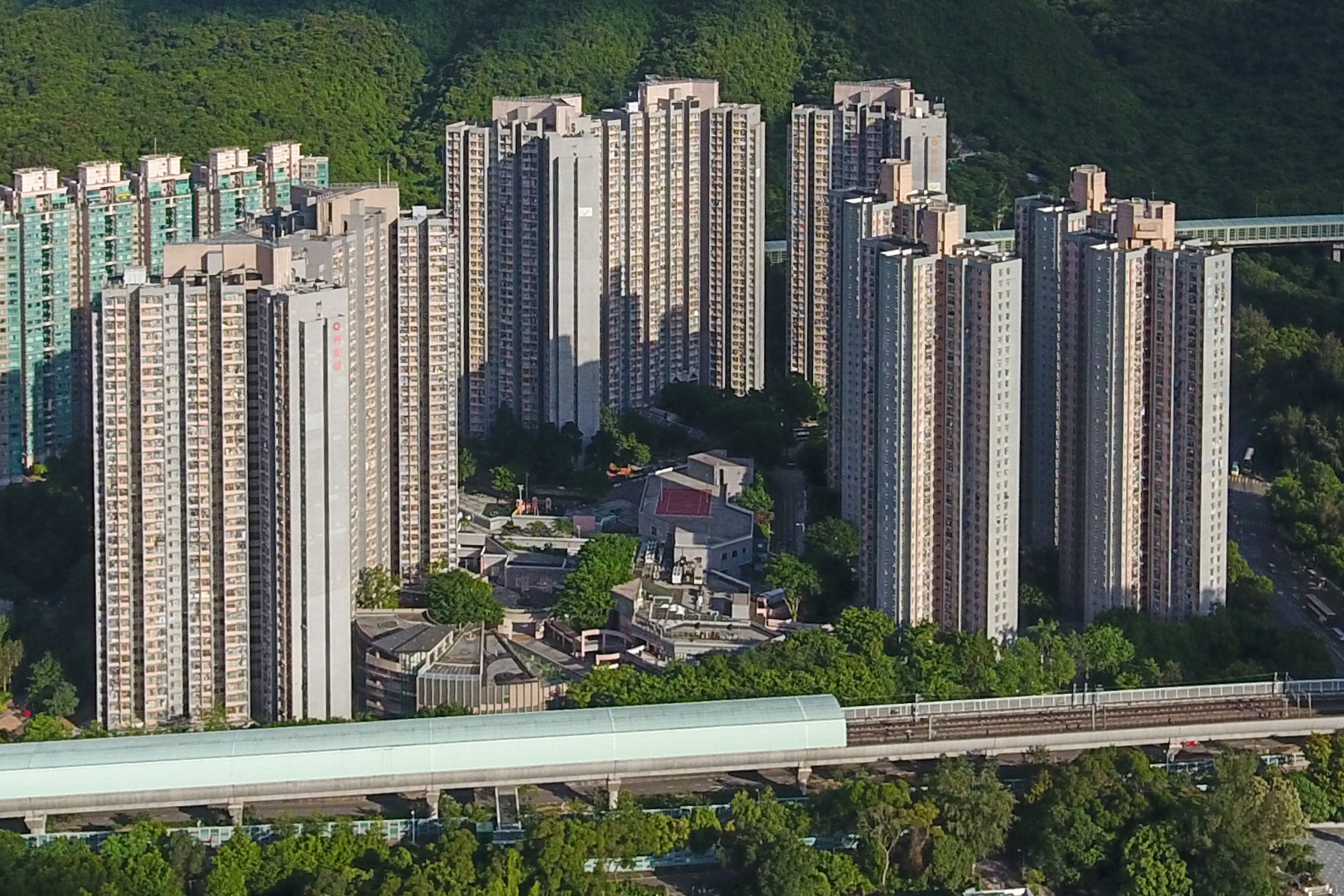
Lee On Estate

Lee On Estate (Chinese: 利安邨) is a public estate located at Wu Kai Sha and near MTR Wu Kai Sha station. It is the third public housing estate in Ma On Shan. It consists of five residential buildings completed in 1993 and 1994. Besides, there is a shopping mall (Lee On Shopping Centre) inside of the housing estate.

Name	Type	Completion
Lee Fung House	Harmony 2	1993
Lee Shing House	Harmony 2	1993
Lee Hing House	Harmony 2	1993
Lee Wah House	Harmony 2	1994
Lee Wing House	Harmony 2	1994

== Park Belvedere ==
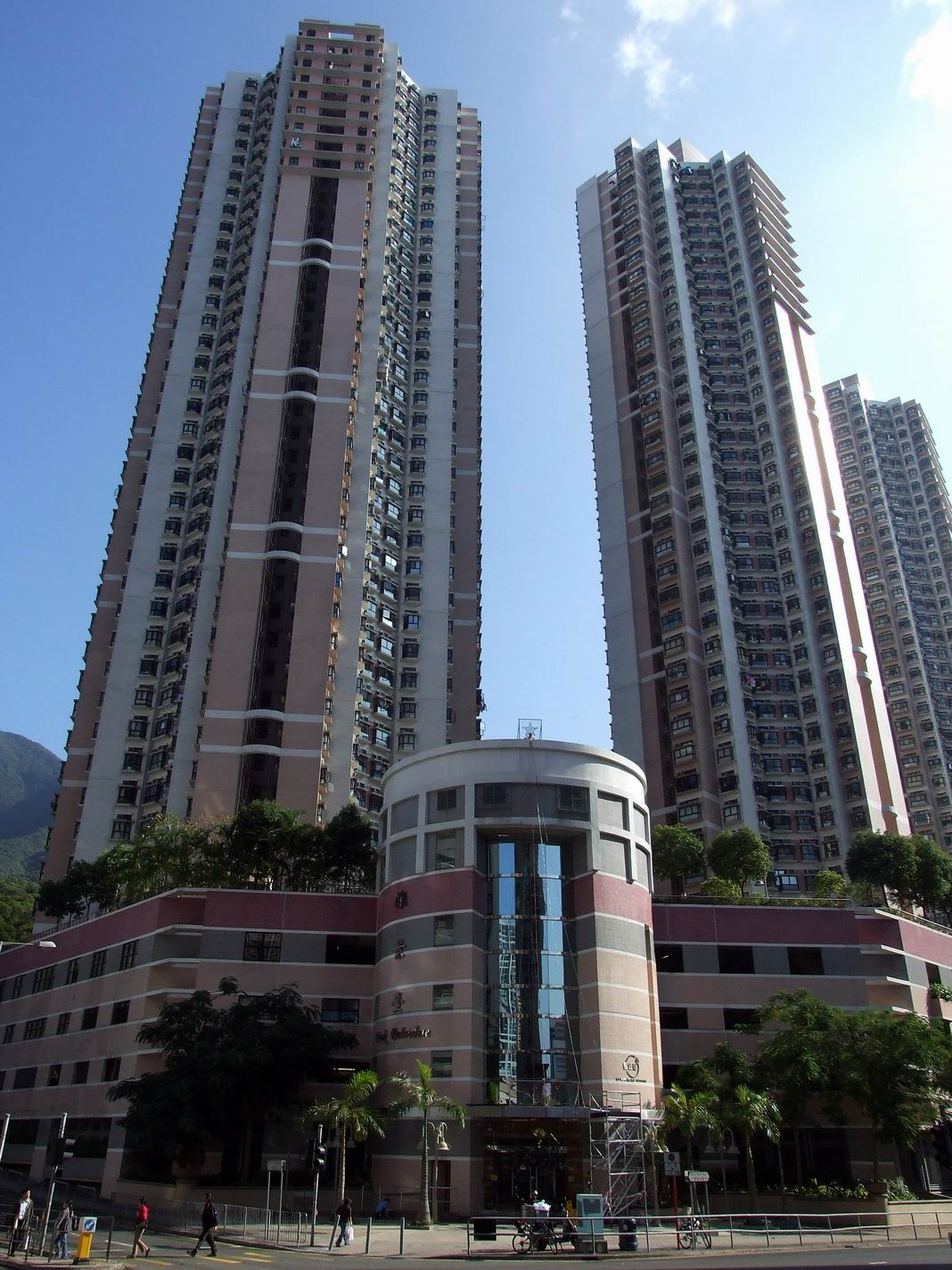
Park Belvedere

Park Belvedere (Chinese: 雅景臺) is a Sandwich Class Housing Scheme court on the reclaimed land of Ma On Shan Town Centre. Developed by the Hong Kong Housing Society, the court consists of four blocks built in 1998.

Name	Type	Completion
Block 1	SCHS	1998
Block 2	SCHS	1998
Block 3	SCHS	1998
Block 4	SCHS	1998

== Saddle Ridge Garden ==
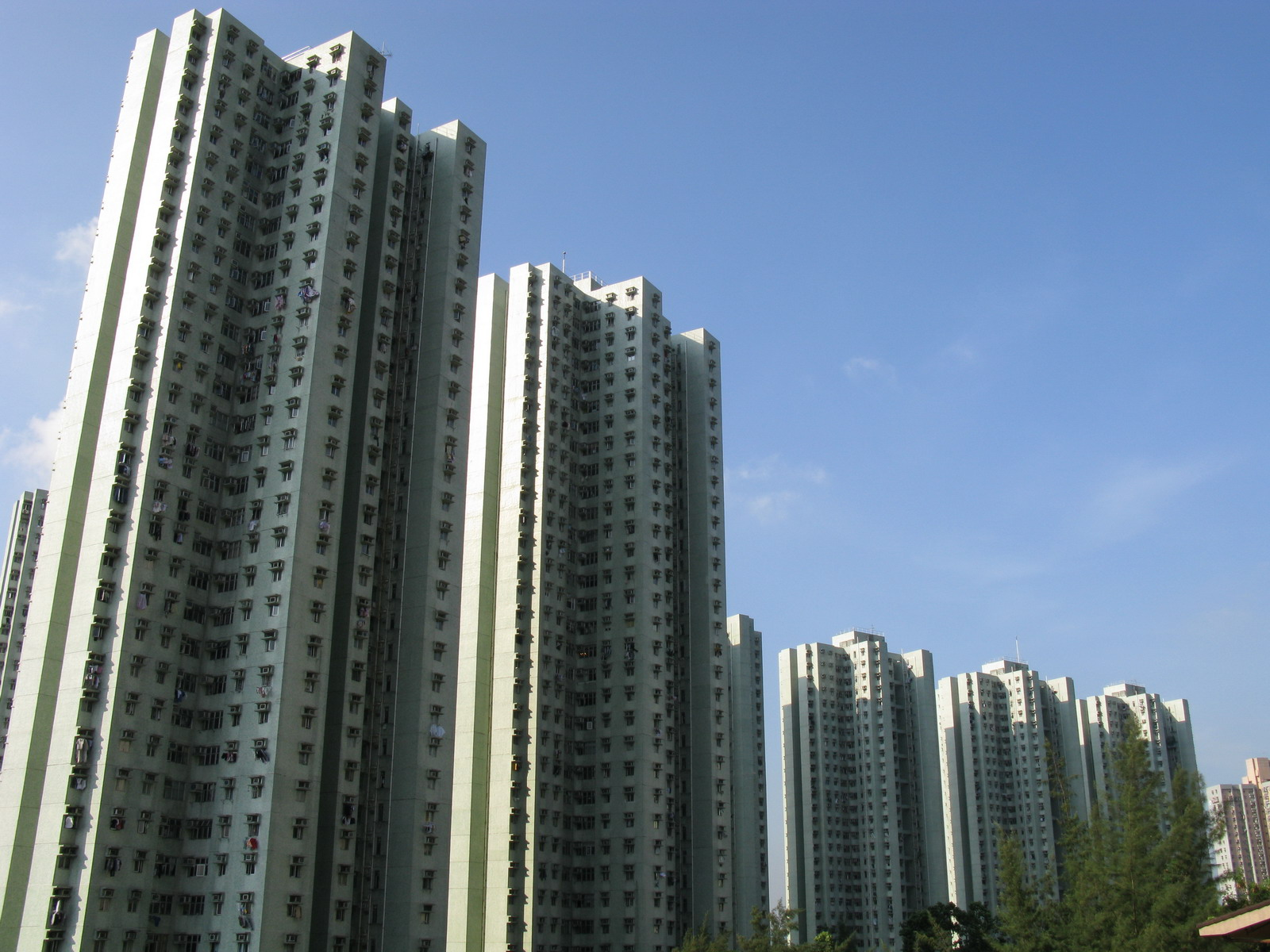
Saddle Ridge Garden

Saddle Ridge Garden (Chinese: 富寶花園) is a HOS and PSPS court in Ma On Shan, built at a hill called Ma On Terrace (or Saddle Ridge Terrace) (Chinese: 馬鞍台). It is named from the name of hill, Saddle Ridge (Chinese: 馬鞍). It was jointly developed by the Hong Kong Housing Authority and Chevalier Group, with totally 12 blocks built in 1993.

Name	Type	Completion
Block 1	PSPS	1993
Block 2	PSPS	1993
Block 3	PSPS	1993
Block 4	PSPS	1993
Block 5	PSPS	1993
Block 6	PSPS	1993
Block 7	PSPS	1993
Block 8	PSPS	1993
Block 9	PSPS	1993
Block 10	PSPS	1993
Block 11	PSPS	1993
Block 12	PSPS	1993

== Yan On Estate ==
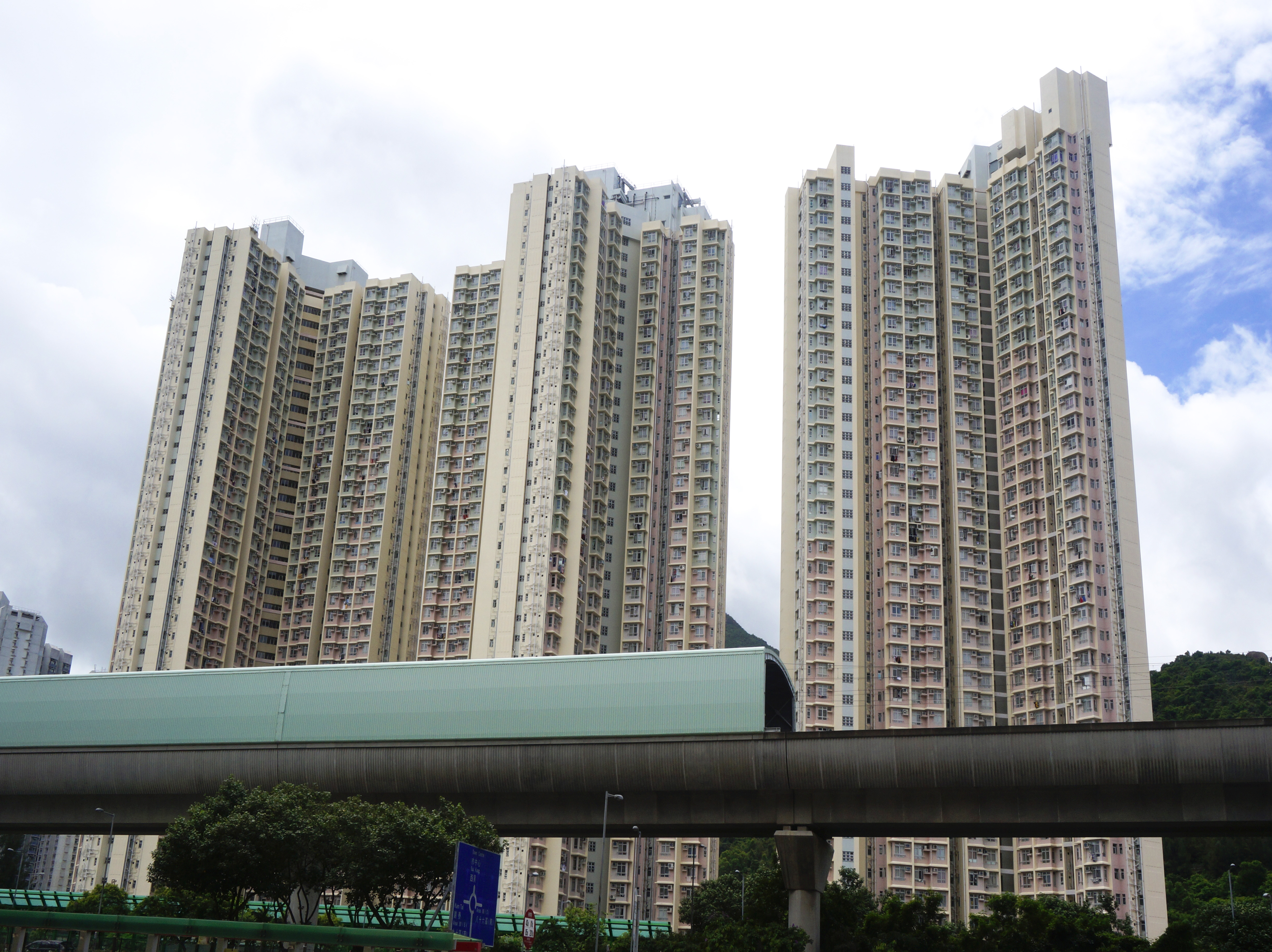
Yan On Estate

Yan On Estate (Chinese: 欣安邨) is a public rental estate south of Heng On Estate. The HK$800 million construction contract was awarded by the Housing Authority to Yau Lee Construction in 2009. The new estate opened in 2011 and comprises three blocks and a small commercial centre. It is designed to house about 6,800 residents in 2,587 flats. The estate is within walking distance of Heng On railway station on the Tuen Ma line.

The shopping centre opened with three shops: a cha chaan teng, a convenience store, and a mini-supermarket. In addition, an empty bay on the ground floor of Yan Hei House was converted into a fourth shop.

The estate is slated for expansion starting in 2018. The carpark will be converted into a multi-storey carpark cum shopping centre. Heng Tai Road will be diverted to make room for three more residential blocks with 1,600 flats to house about 4,900 residents. The expansion is scheduled for completion in 2021.

Name	Chinese name	Type	Completion
Yan Chung House	欣頌樓	Non-standard	2011
Yan Hei House	欣喜樓	Non-standard	2011
Yan Yuet House	欣悅樓	Non-standard	2011

== Yiu On Estate ==
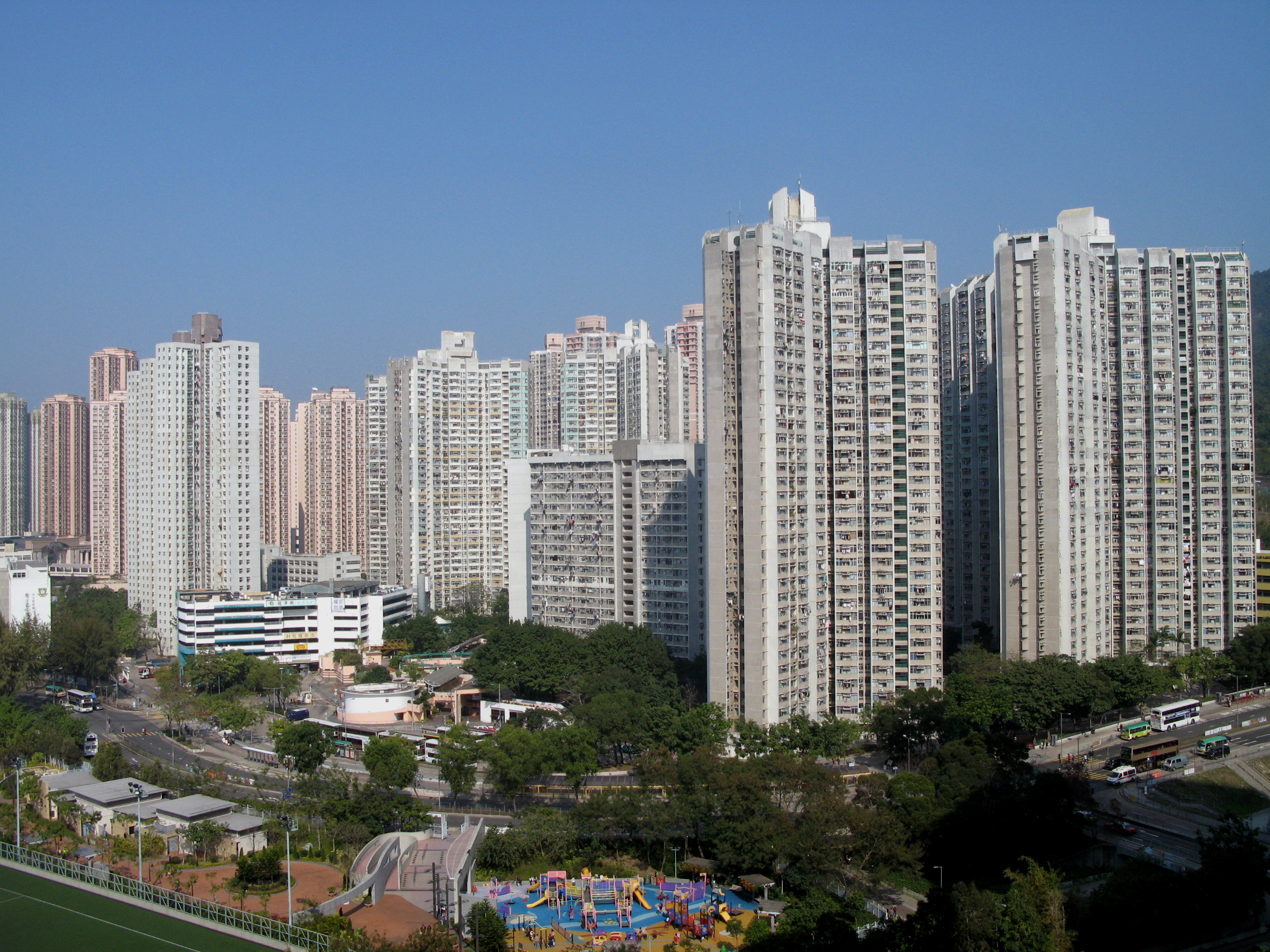
Yiu On Estate

Yiu On Estate (耀安邨) is a public estate and TPS estate located in Ma On Shan in Sha Tin, New Territories, Hong Kong. It is the second housing estate in Ma On Shan. It was built on the reclaimed land between Ma On Shan Road and Sai Sha Road in 1988. Some of the flats were sold to the tenants through TPS Phase 2 in 1999.

Besides, there is a shopping mall (Yiu On Shopping Centre) inside of the housing estate.

The estate is home to the Ma On Shan campus of the Hong Kong College of Technology, a vocational institute.

Name	Type	Completion
Yiu Ping House	Trident 4	1988
Yiu Chung House	Trident 4	1988
Yiu Yan House	Trident 4	1988
Yiu Wing House	Trident 4	1988
Yiu Shun House	Trident 3	1988
Yiu Him House	Trident 3	1988
Yiu Wo House	New Slab	1988

== See also ==
- Public housing in Hong Kong
- List of public housing estates in Hong Kong
