= Ma On Shan Town Centre (constituency) =

Hong Kong constituency

- Former elected constituency for the Sha Tin District Council
- Boundary of Ma On Shan Town Centre in Sha Tin District
- District: Sha Tin
- Legislative Council constituency: New Territories South East
- Population: 17,520 (2019)
- Electorate: 10,307 (2019)

Former constituency
- Created: 2011
- Abolished: 2023
- Number of members: One
- Member: Johnny Chung Lai-him (Independent) (Final)
- Created from: Sunshine City
- Replaced by: Sha Tin North
- Median monthly household income: $30,000 (2021)
- Ethnicity (2021): 93.3% Chinese; 2.3% Indonesian; 2.2% Filipino; 0.6% White; 1.6% Other

Ma On Shan Town Centre, formerly called Sunshine City, was one of Ma On Shan's 13 constituencies in the Sha Tin District Council in Hong Kong. The constituency returned one district councillor to the Sha Tin District Council, with an election every four years. The seat was last held by Independent Chung Lai-him from 2020 to 2023.

Following the 2023 electoral changes, the seat was merged into the Sha Tin North constituency, which includes most of the Ma On Shan area. The Ma On Shan Town Centre constituency was loosely based on part of the Sunshine City, Bayshore Towers and Villa Oceania in Ma On Shan with an estimated population of 17,520.

== Councillors represented ==
Election	Member	Party
1999	Alvin Lee Chi-wing	Independent pro-Beijing
2019	Johnny Chung Lai-him	Independent democrat

== Election results ==
=== 2010s ===
Sha Tin District Council Election, 2019: Ma On Shan Town Centre
Party	Candidate	Votes	%	±%
Ind. democrat	Johnny Chung Lai-him	4,744	60.54	
Nonpartisan	Alvin Lee Chi-wing	2,791	35.62	−32.78
Independent	Yau Man-king	165	2.11	
Nonpartisan	Lee Kai-hung	99	1.26	
Nonpartisan	Ng Wai-ling	37	0.47	
Majority		1,953	24.92	N/A
Turnout		7,864	76.31	+36.71
Ind. democrat gain from Nonpartisan		Swing		

Sha Tin District Council Election, 2015: Ma On Shan Town Centre
Party	Candidate	Votes	%	±%
Independent	Alvin Lee Chi-wing	2,391	68.4	+7.9
Ind. democrat	Man Chi-wai	1,106	31.6	
Majority		1,285	36.8	
Turnout		3,597	39.6	
Independent hold		Swing		

Sha Tin District Council Election, 2011: Ma On Shan Town Centre
Party	Candidate	Votes	%	±%
Independent	Alvin Lee Chi-wing	2,180	60.5	
Democratic	Richard Tsoi Yiu-cheong	1,421	39.5	
Independent hold		Swing		

=== 2000s ===
Sha Tin District Council Election, 2007: Sunshine City
Party	Candidate	Votes	%	±%
Independent	Alvin Lee Chi-wing	1,614	55.3	
Frontier	Chan Ka-kin	817	28.0	
Independent	Frederick Ho Kam-chuen	489	16.7	
Independent hold		Swing		

Sha Tin District Council Election, 2003: Sunshine City
Party	Candidate	Votes	%	±%
Independent	Alvin Lee Chi-wing	1,620	47.3	
Independent	Frederick Ho Kam-chuen	1,335	39.0	
Justice Union	Angel Leung On-kay	472	13.8	
Independent hold		Swing		

=== 1990s ===
Sha Tin District Council Election, 1999: Sunshine City
Party	Candidate	Votes	%	±%
Independent	Alvin Lee Chi-wing	888	41.1	
Democratic	Chan King-ming	702	32.5	
Frontier	Lee Poon-shing	562	26.0	
Independent win (new seat)				
