= Ma On Shan Road =

Road in Hong Kong

Coordinates: 22.4133°N 114.2265°E

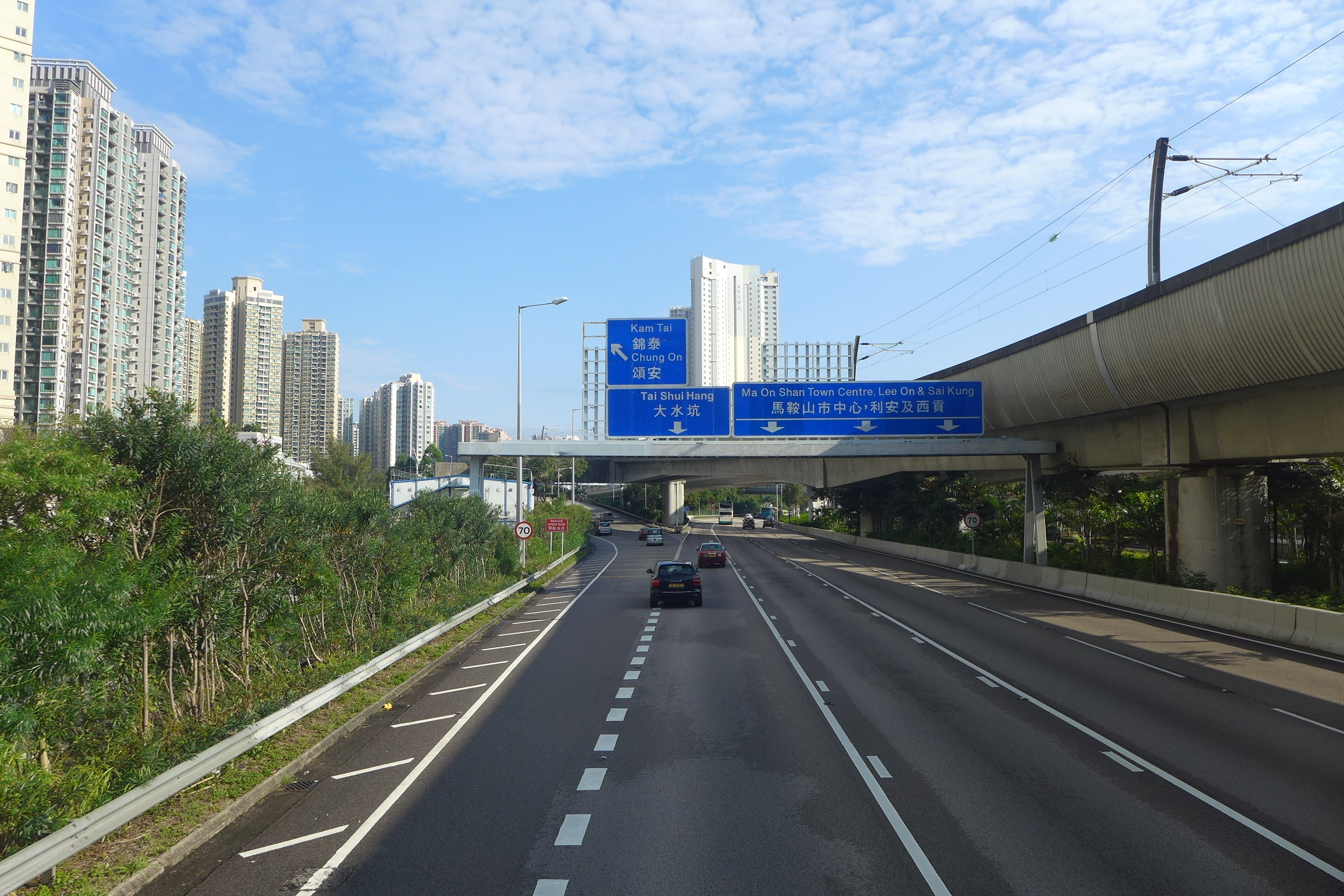
- Ma On Shan Road
- Native name: 馬鞍山路 (Yue Chinese)
- Length: 3.3 kilometres (2.1 mi)
- Location: Ma On Shan, Hong Kong
- Southwest end: Tate's Cairn Highway
- Northeast end: Sai Sha Road

Ma On Shan Road (Chinese: 馬鞍山路) is a major road in the new town of Ma On Shan in the New Territories of Hong Kong. The road extends northward from Tate's Cairn Highway near Tai Shui Hang along the eastern bank of the Shing Mun River. It ends in the north when it joins Sai Sha Road near Wu Kai Sha. Its branch road, the Ma On Shan Bypass, redirects traffic between Sha Tin and Sai Kung North away from the town centre near the Heng On Estate. It is the primary thoroughfare to Ma On Shan. A short section of the road north of Tate's Cairn Highway is an expressway.

== See also ==
- Ma On Shan
- Sai Sha Road
- List of streets and roads in Hong Kong
