= Tai Shui Hang (constituency) =

Hong Kong constituency

- 大水坑
- Elected constituency for the Sha Tin District Council
- Boundary of Tai Shui Hang in Sha Tin District
- District: Sha Tin
- Legislative Council constituency: New Territories South East
- Population: 18,939 (2019)
- Electorate: 12,031 (2019)

Current constituency
- Created: 1994
- Number of members: One
- Member: Vacant

Tai Shui Hang
- Traditional Chinese: 大水坑
Transcriptions
Yue: Cantonese
- Yale Romanization: Daaih séui hāang
- Jyutping: Daai6 soei2 haang1

Tai Shui Hang is one of the 41 constituencies of the Sha Tin District Council. The seat elects one member of the council every four years. The constituency has an estimated population of 18,939.

== Councillors represented ==
Election	Member	Party
1994	Ho Sau-mo	Nonpartisan
199?	Ho Sau-mo	Progressive Alliance
2005	Ho Sau-mo	DAB
2007	Michael Yung Ming-chau→Vacant	Democratic
2010	Michael Yung Ming-chau→Vacant	Neo Democrats
2015	Michael Yung Ming-chau→Vacant	Nonpartisan
2016	Michael Yung Ming-chau→Vacant	Civic

== Election results ==
=== 2010s ===
Sha Tin District Council Election, 2019: Tai Shui Hang
Party	Candidate	Votes	%	±%
Civic	Michael Yung Ming-chau	5,157	58.72	
DAB	Henry Chu Wun-chiu	3,626	41.28	
Majority		1,531	17.44	
Turnout		8,818	73.74	
Civic hold		Swing		
