= Festival city =

Festival city may refer to:

- Adelaide, The Festival City, City of Food & Wine, South Australia.
- Cedar City, Utah
- Dubai Festival City, residential, business and entertainment development in the city of Dubai.
- Edmonton, Alberta, Canada
- Festival City, a private housing estate in Hong Kong
- Ottawa, Ontario, Canada
- . Milwaukee, Wisconsin
