= Lake Silver =

Private housing estate in Ma On Shan, Hong Kong

Coordinates: 22.4286°N 114.2446°E

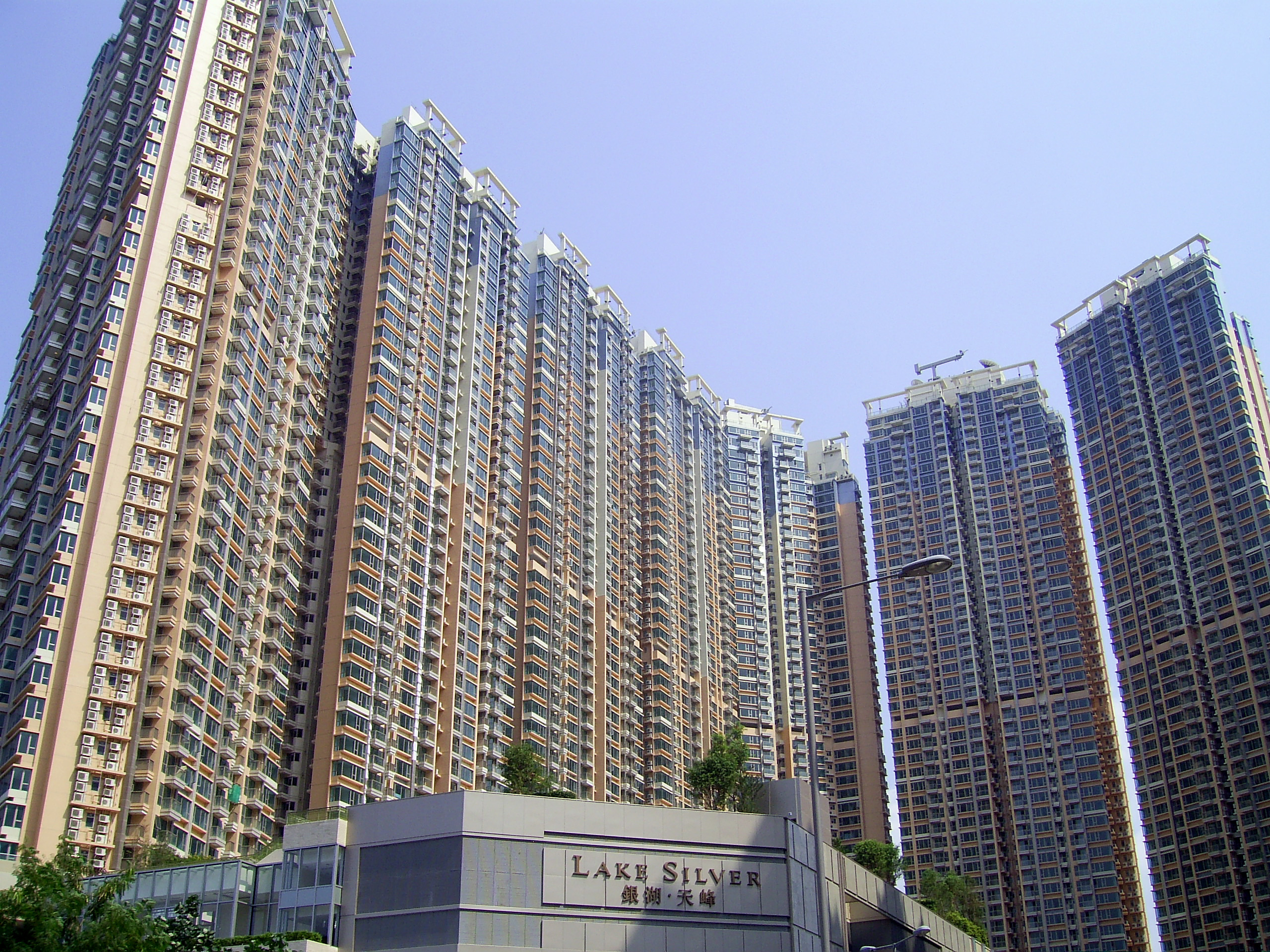
Lake Silver

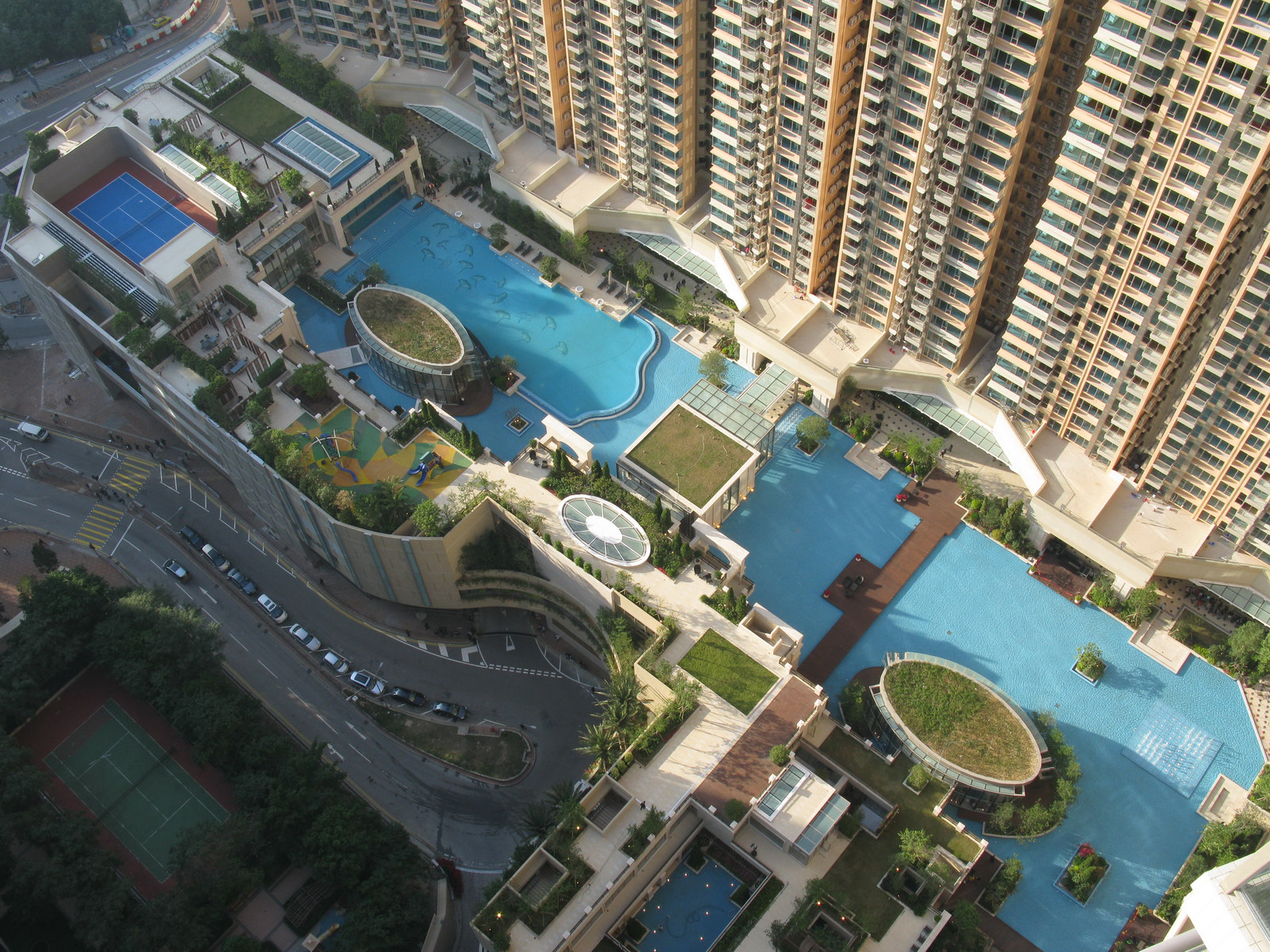
View of clubhouse and swimming pool

Lake Silver (Chinese: 銀湖·天峰), formerly known as Lake W (銀峰·湖泊), is a private housing estate consisting of a shopping centre with flats located above it. It is located in Ma On Shan, Hong Kong between Wu Kai Sha station and Monte Vista, another housing development. Developed by MTR Corporation and Sino Land, the whole project covers an area of 370,000 square feet (34,000 m^{2}), and it was completed in 2009. The development consists of residential buildings, a shopping centre and a clubhouse.

== Description ==
Lake Silver consists of seven residential blocks, ranging from 39 to 47 stories. The blocks form an L-shape when viewed from above. Together, they provide 2,218 residential units, with an average flat size of approximately 76 square meters. The shopping centre has an area of approximately 4,000 square meters while the car park has 340 spaces. Projects to large units of the main two-bedroom flats start from 700 sq ft (65 m^{2}) onwards, and to set up linked to double, even the roof and other characteristics of household units, the whole estate of more than 20 different types of intervals. Flat ceiling height of 10 feet (3.0 m), are built with environmentally-friendly household terrace, living room is equipped with the glass floor. Housing part of the club will be located in the MTR Wu Kai Sha station shelters, connected by two small split-bridge.

== Standard units ==
- 2 bedrooms - 695 feet (212 m) - 753 feet
- 2 rooms (multi-purpose room) - 790 feet (240 m) - 805 feet
- 3 bedrooms (master suite) - 896 feet (273 m) - 920 feet
- 3 bedrooms (master suite and multi-purpose room) - 971 feet (296 m) - 1,046 feet
- 3 bedrooms (master suite and multi-purpose rooms and workplaces) - 1,159 feet (353 m) - 1,372 feet
- 4 bedrooms (master suite and workplaces) - 1,319 feet (402 m)
- 4 bedrooms (two suites and workplaces) - 1,873 feet (571 m) - 2,416 feet

== Special units ==
=== Lake Palace ===
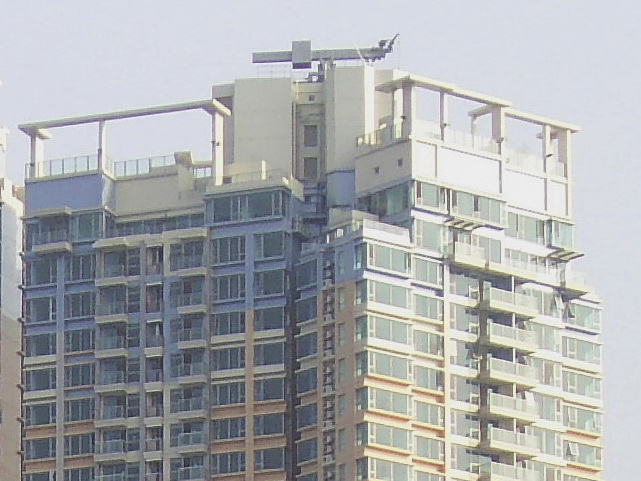
The Lake Palace is located in a characteristic unit of

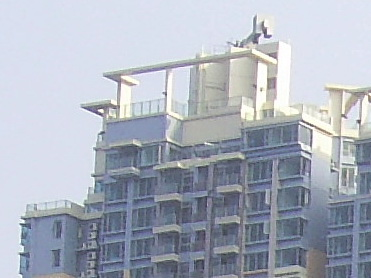
The Lake Palace is located in six characteristics of units

The Lake Palace consists of seven special units located on the upper floors of Blocks 1, 6 and 7 (5 duplex units, two adjoining units). The units range from approximately 2,362 feet (720 m) to 3,265 feet (995 m), unique is that the roof of each unit is illustrated with a private swimming pool.

=== Lake Villa ===
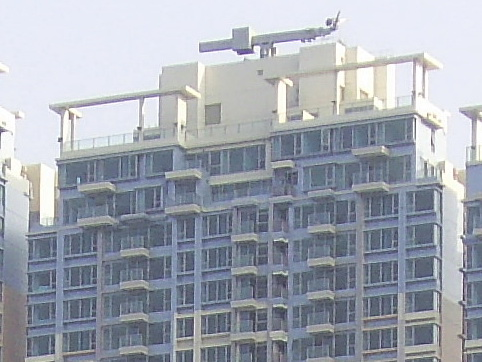
located in the Lake Villa features two units of

The Lake Villa consists of 11 duplex units, located on the top floor of Blocks 1 to 5 and 8. The units range from 2,097 feet (639 m) to 2,537 feet (773 m). Each unit has a private balcony or outdoor area.

=== Lake Sky ===
The Lake Sky development consists of 14 special units, including 13 duplex units and one adjoining unit. These units have floor areas of approximately 1,600-square-foot (150 m2), located in the top 1–8, and each unit includes a private rooftop area.

== Building design ==
Lake Silver has blocks of varying heights, using a high ladder-type design. One of the shortest was handed to him in the stratigraphic sequence in each block, seven the highest, Lex and the MOS ridgeline tie. Unit size is also another consideration. The north (1,2,3,5 Block) unit, as it will be the next Lok Wo Sha block property project's landscape, is 31 F, the following fully funded small units, because the building of more than 31 more than Lok Wo Sha The height is restricted to the project, hence the use of large units in the design. The east (7,8 Block) units, due to enjoy a permanent non-block landscape, are all in order to enter the giant unit. 6 seats at the corner L-estate, with the north and the east wall, so blocks that contain both the size of the above-mentioned units.

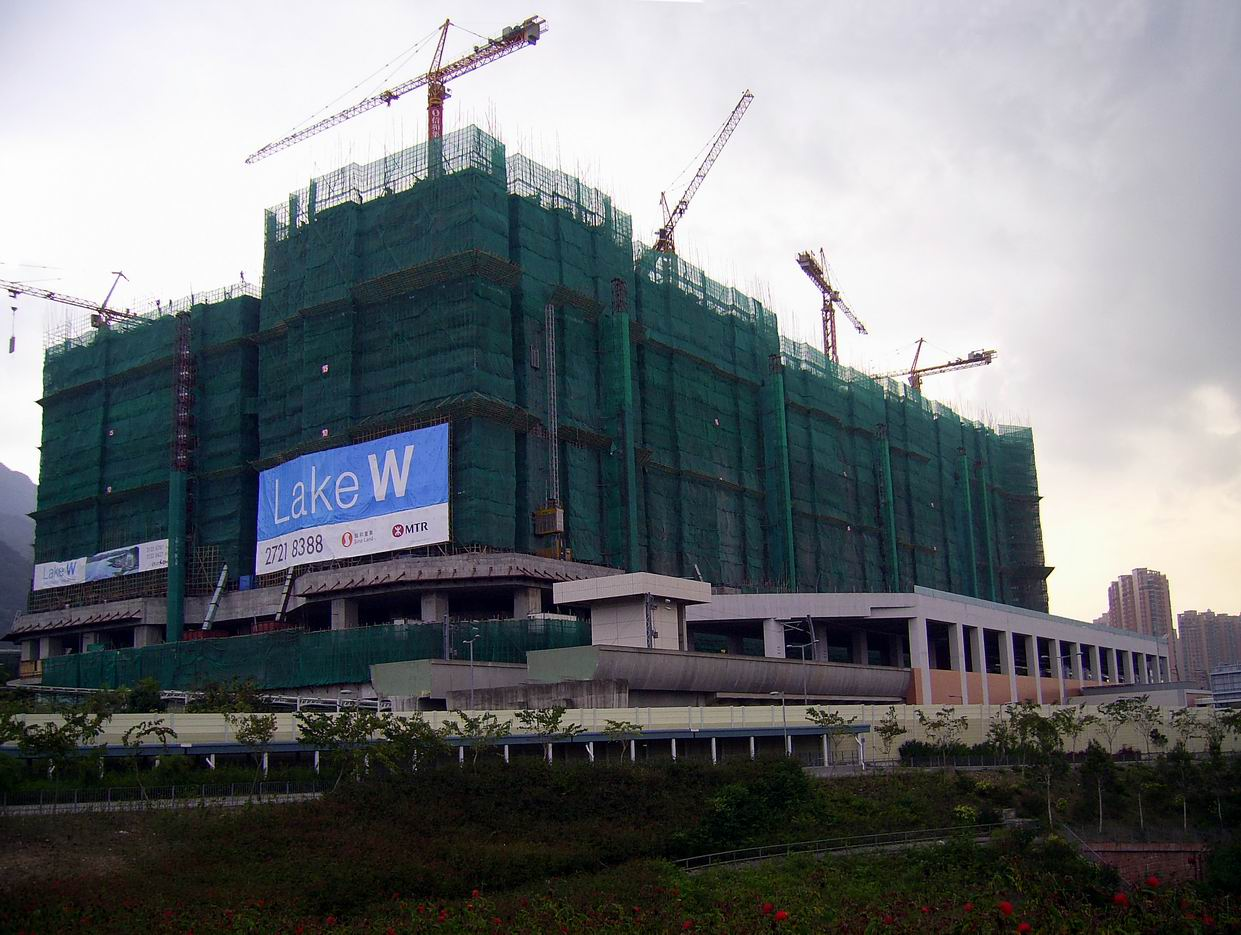
Architecture in Lake Silver (March 2008)

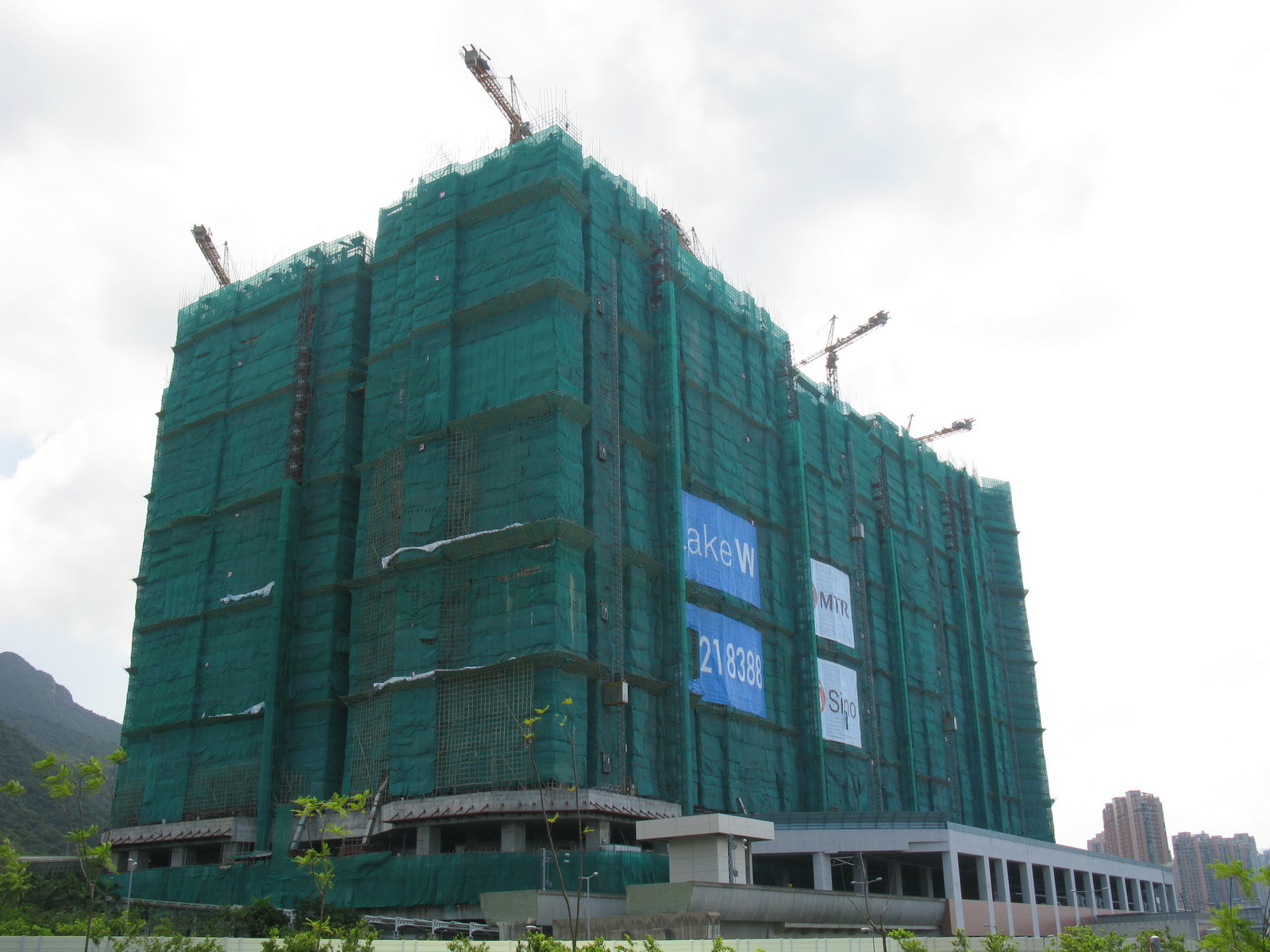
Architecture in Lake Silver (August 2008)

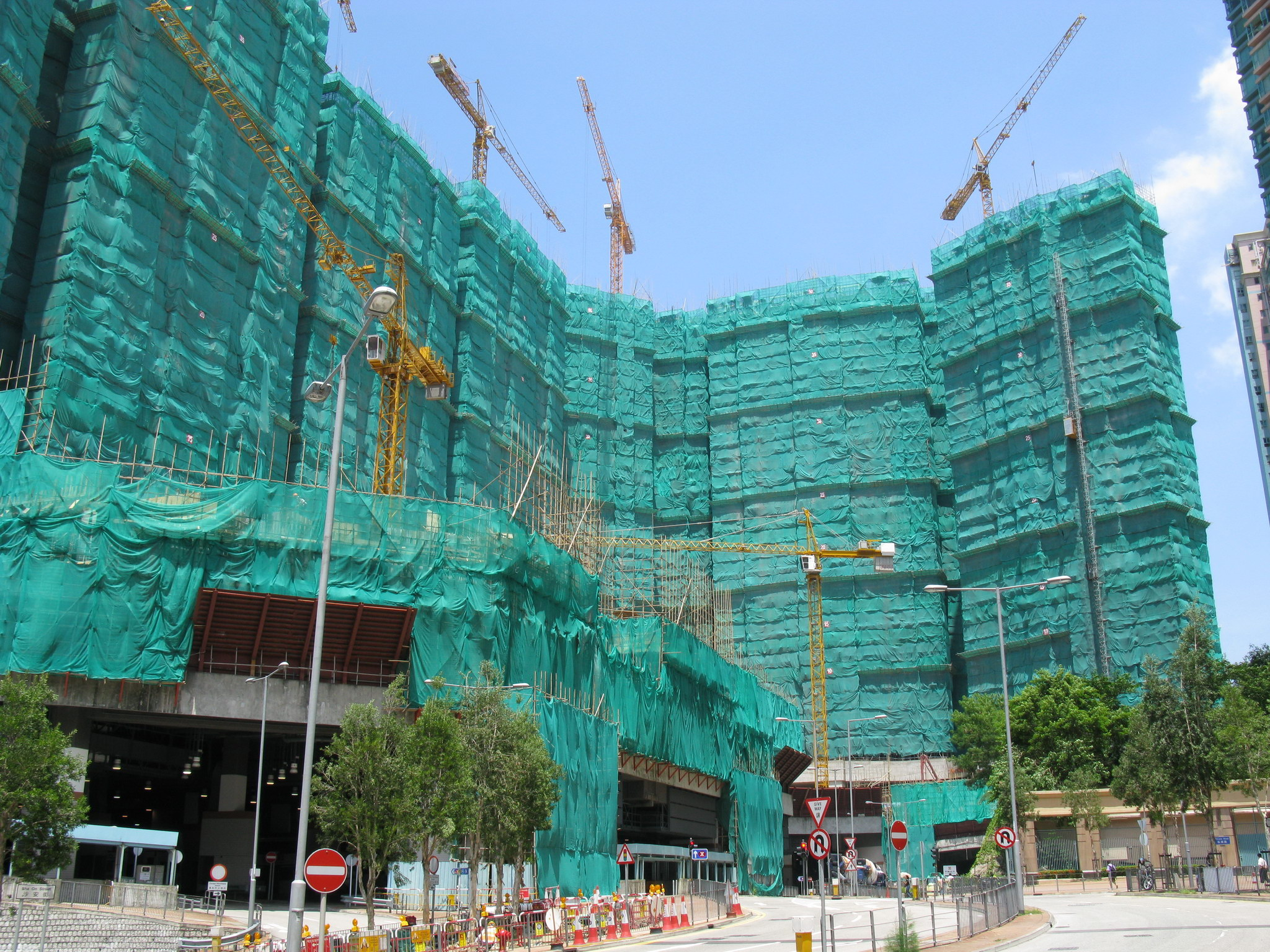
Architectural peak days in the south wall of the Silver Lake (August 2008)

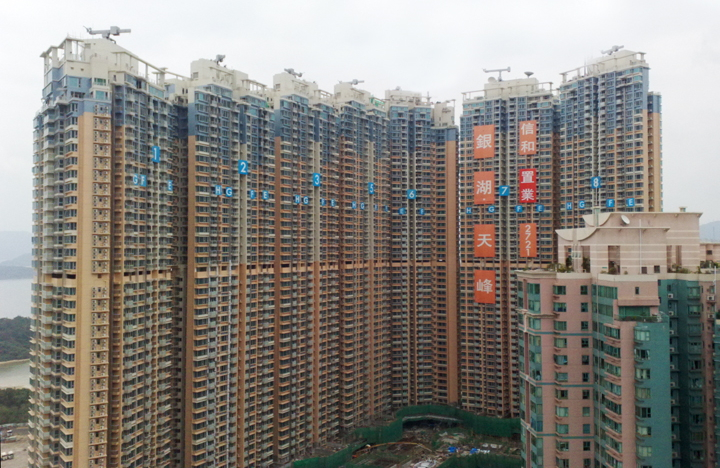
by Lee On Estate Lihua roof layer film in the Silver Lake building external wall of the south peak days (May 2009)

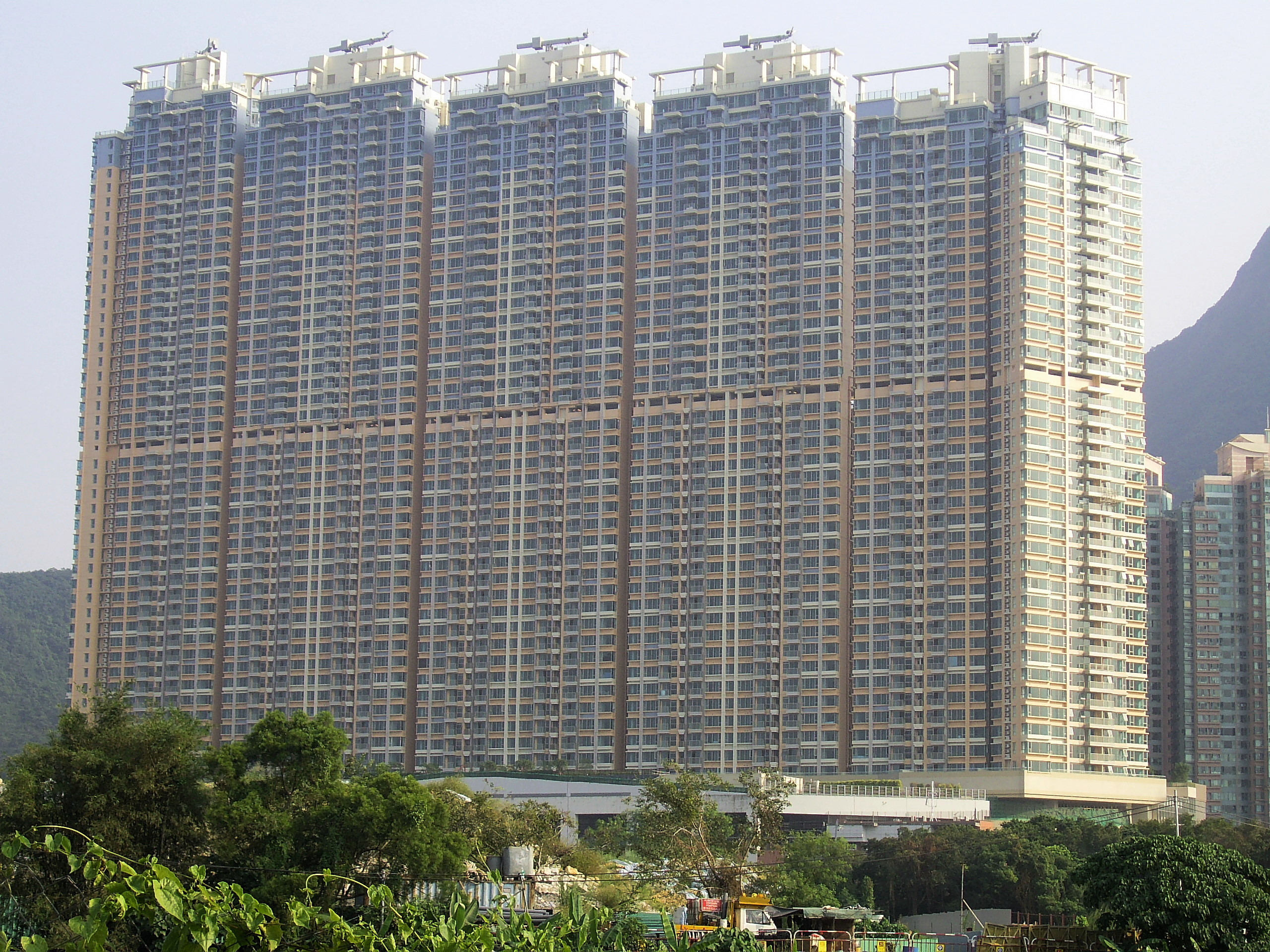
Silver Lake north peak days 1–6, Block (No Block 4)

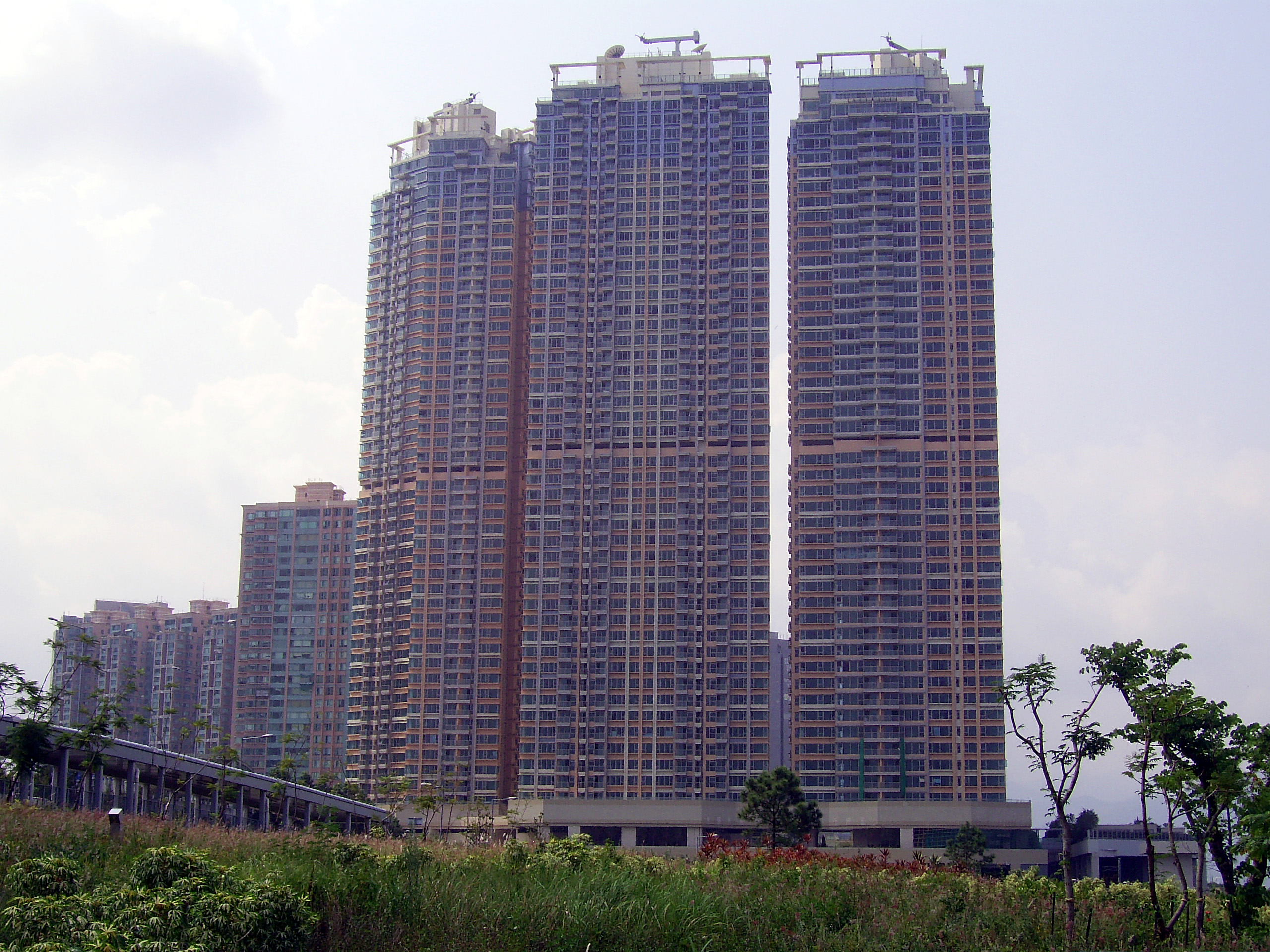
Lake Silver east of Block 6-8

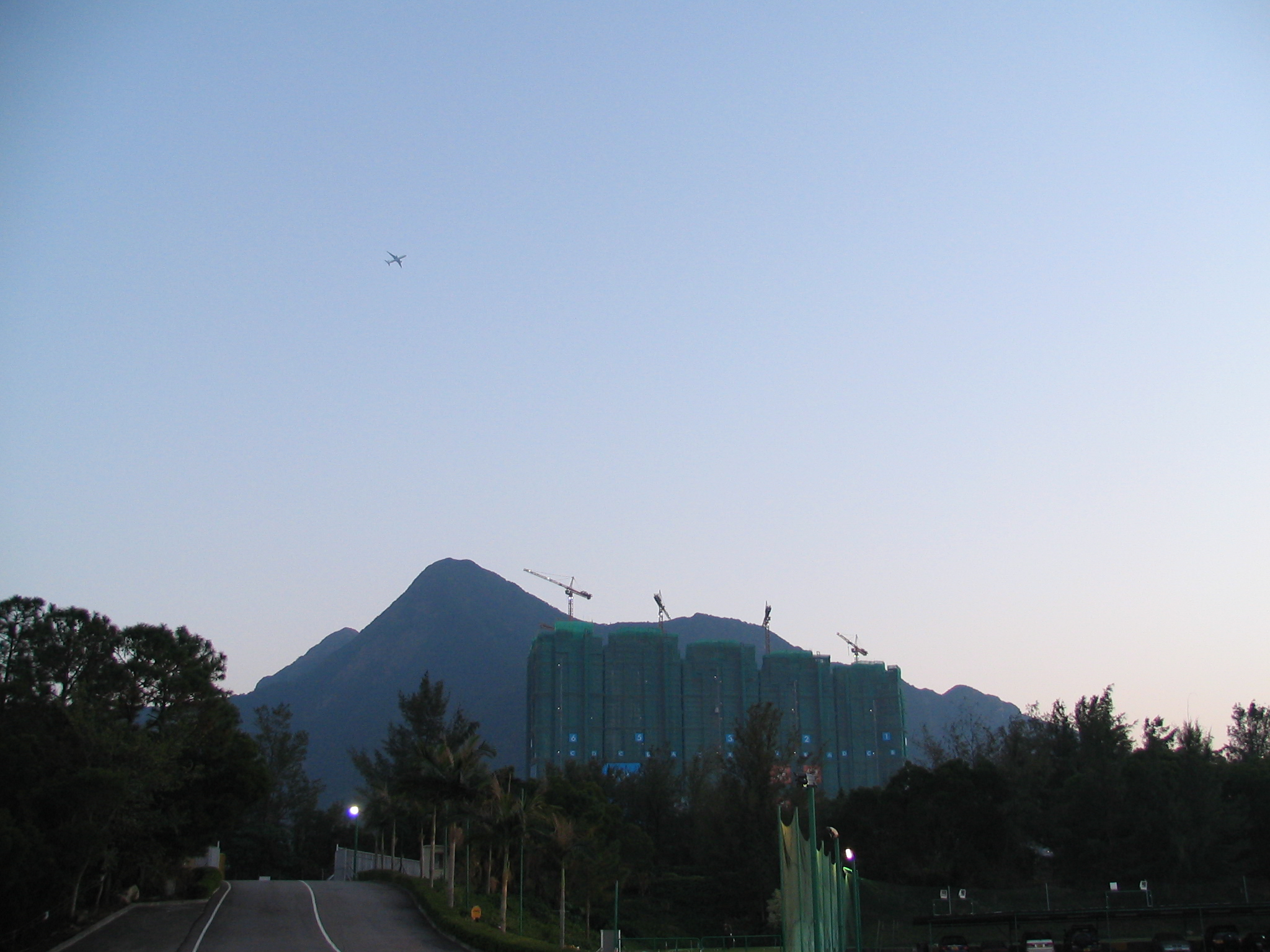
the buildings were behind the ridge line with the height and

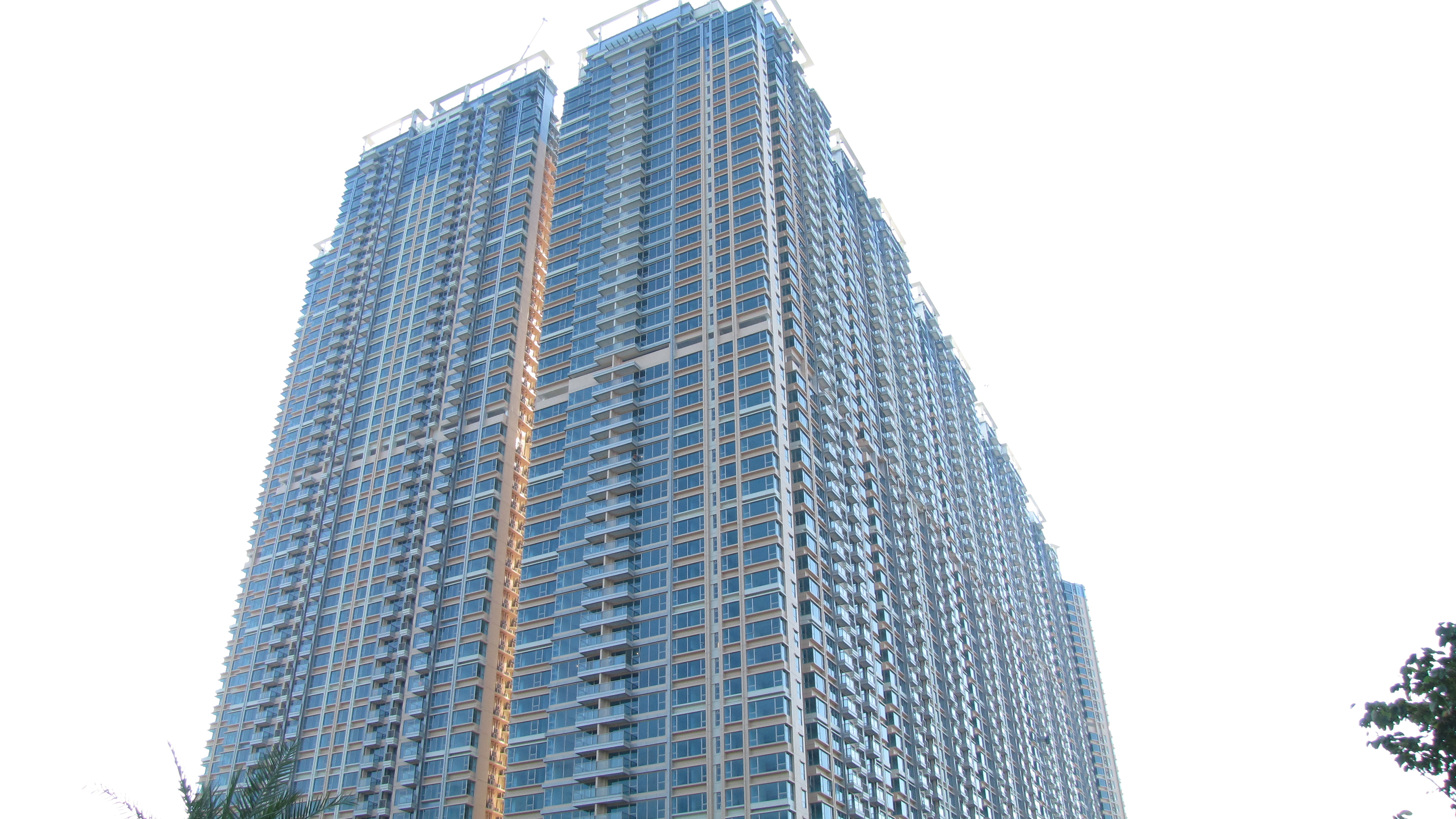
(right) east small units, (left) to the west of major units of

== Clubhouse ==
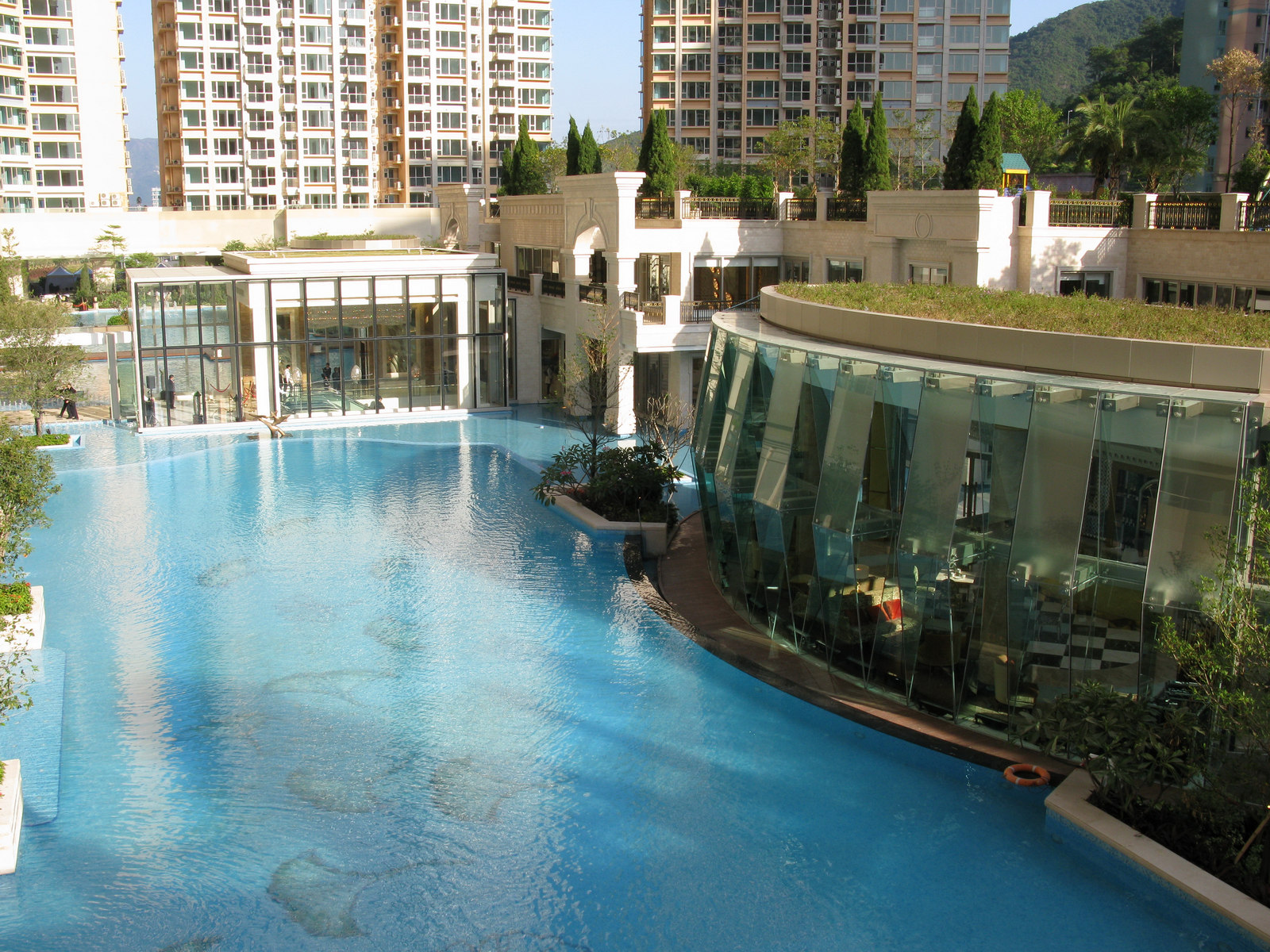
Clubhouse with outdoor pool named 'Sapphire Lake'

Lake Silver clubhouse named "PALACE BY THE SEA", a total area of 360,000 square feet (33,000 m^{2}) for the Sino Land a unit of real estate Yu Shan "Palazzo Derby Clubhouse" of 1.5 times. Hong Kong's first private club with islands (in the Wu Kai Sha station roof), the island is located three independent directors and a number of big houses and swimming pools. Club also has three banquet halls, including water Eden banquet hall, banquet hall and Ruby Sapphire Crown Royal Banquet Hall. Other facilities include 50-meter-long European lake-style outdoor swimming pool, indoor heated swimming pool, tree house Qinzileyuan, fitness room, outdoor children park, garden barbecue, indoor multipurpose stadium and so on.

== Advertising ==
The advertising of Lake Silver featured the song "Con Te Partirò" by Italian singer Andrea Bocelli.

3 November 2009, Lake Silver TV ad days, has been Hong Kong Broadcasting Authority ruled that false and misleading. Council considered the licensee to submit relevant information and representations that: i the property of their value and popularity of the landscape is very important. Advertising can be imaginative ways to express, but the important property information must be accurate, should not have misleading. Ads at the end of the screen shows a panoramic view of the property. The end of the screen showed that the property is located in an environment surrounded by trees, but no other buildings nearby, the audience will think that this is a true description of the property, resulting in false and misleading advertising; and ii the licensee did not make reasonable efforts to determine the accuracy of the information in the ad. They should be available from the developer's "Property development information" and noted that the property adjacent to other housing estates, but the ad at the end of the screen does not show these buildings.

== Walled design ==
Lake Silver days in order to L-shaped buildings arranged in seven completely obscured behind the Monte Vista, but its completion is expected when the sea some premises will be Henderson Lok Wo Sha item block. The latter project is divided into 7, 25 3,335 households in between 10 and 32-storey level, is expected to Silver Lake and the lower middle class households in peak days, it is impossible to enjoy sea views.

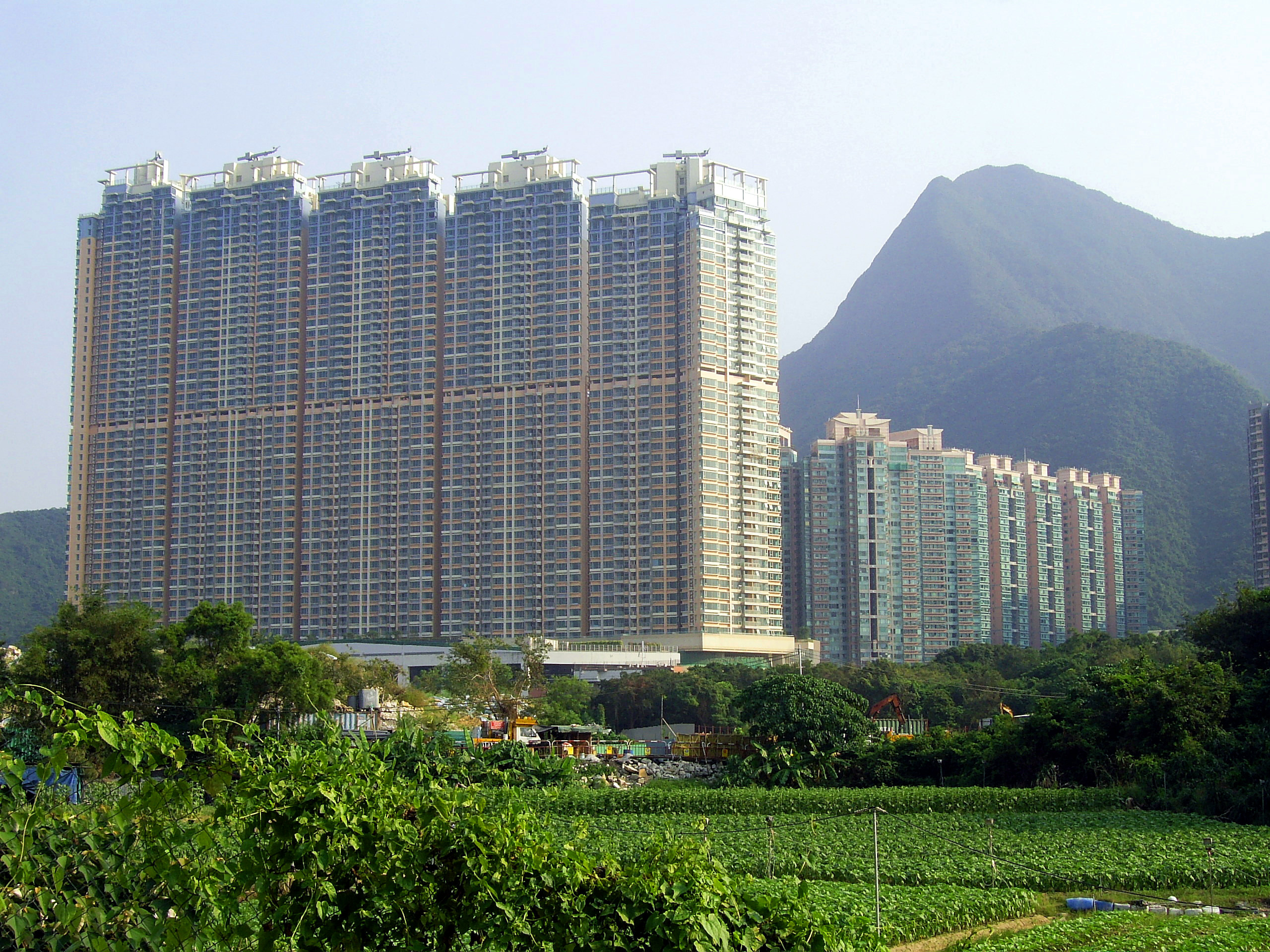
Lake Silver days behind the peak and the Monte Vista

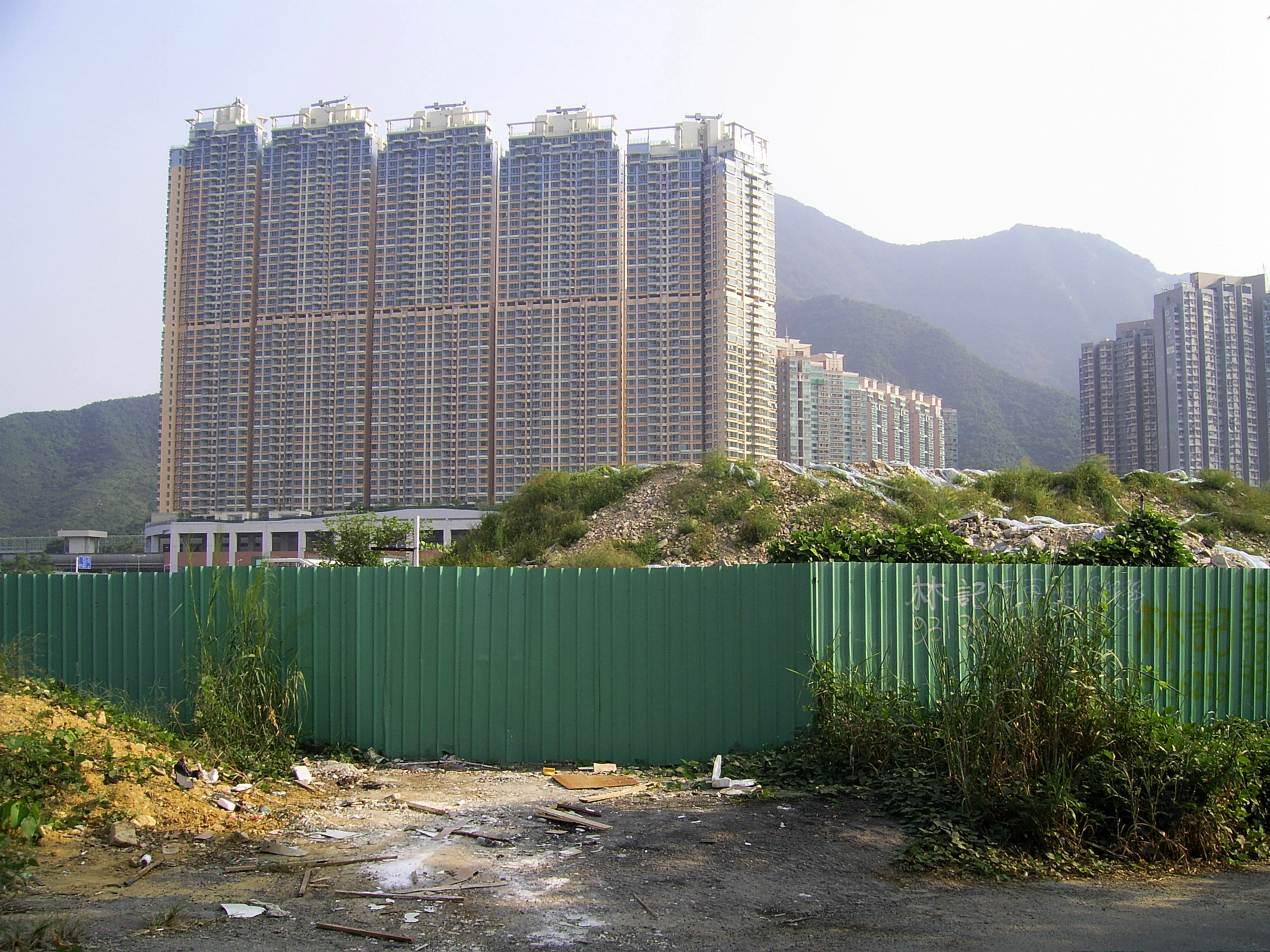
Lake Silver in front of a Lok Wo Sha project site

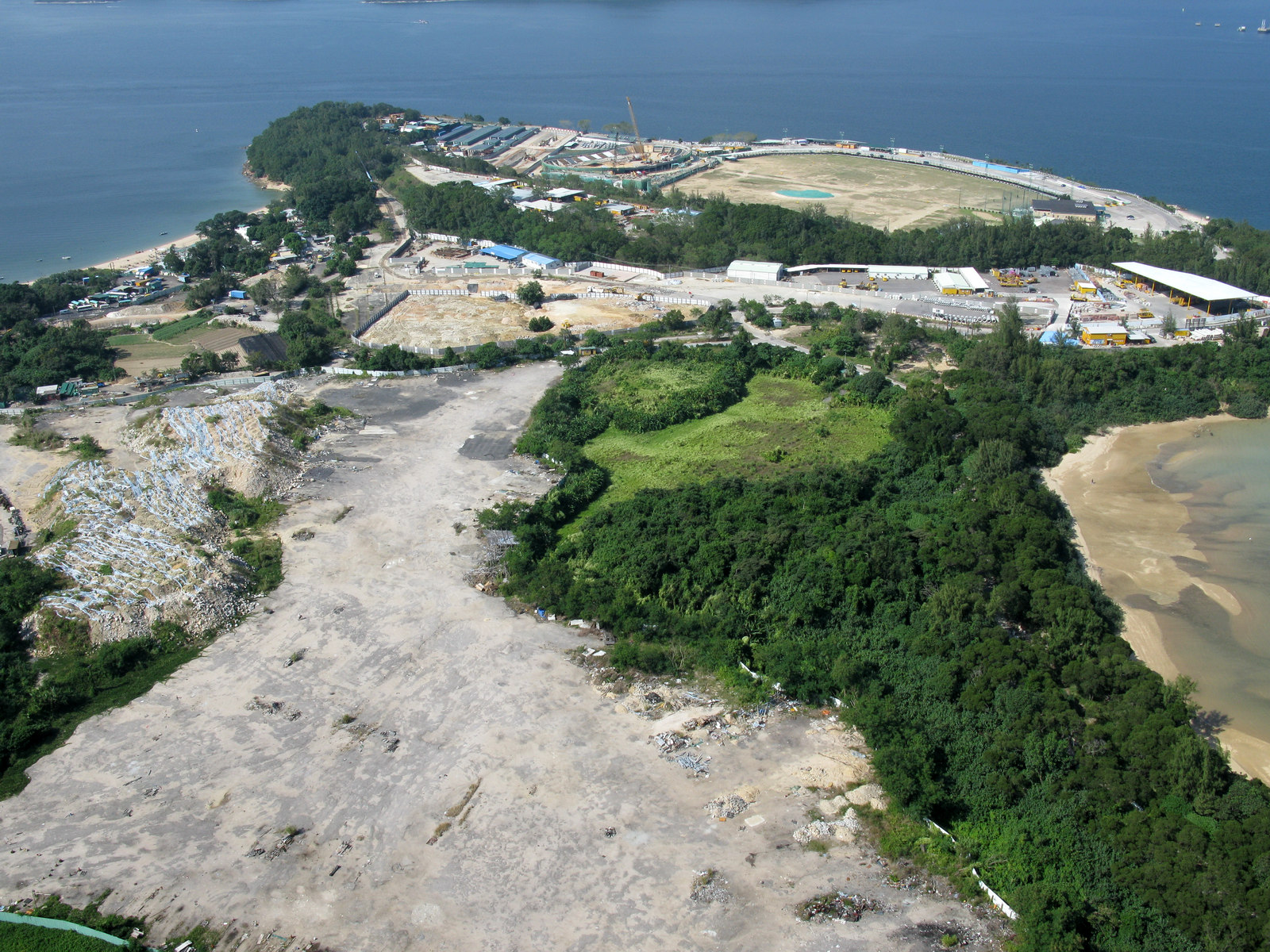
Lake Silver Chapter 6 days 65 F (43 floors) the direction of Lok Wo Sha landscape, left corner Henderson Lok Wo Sha item site.

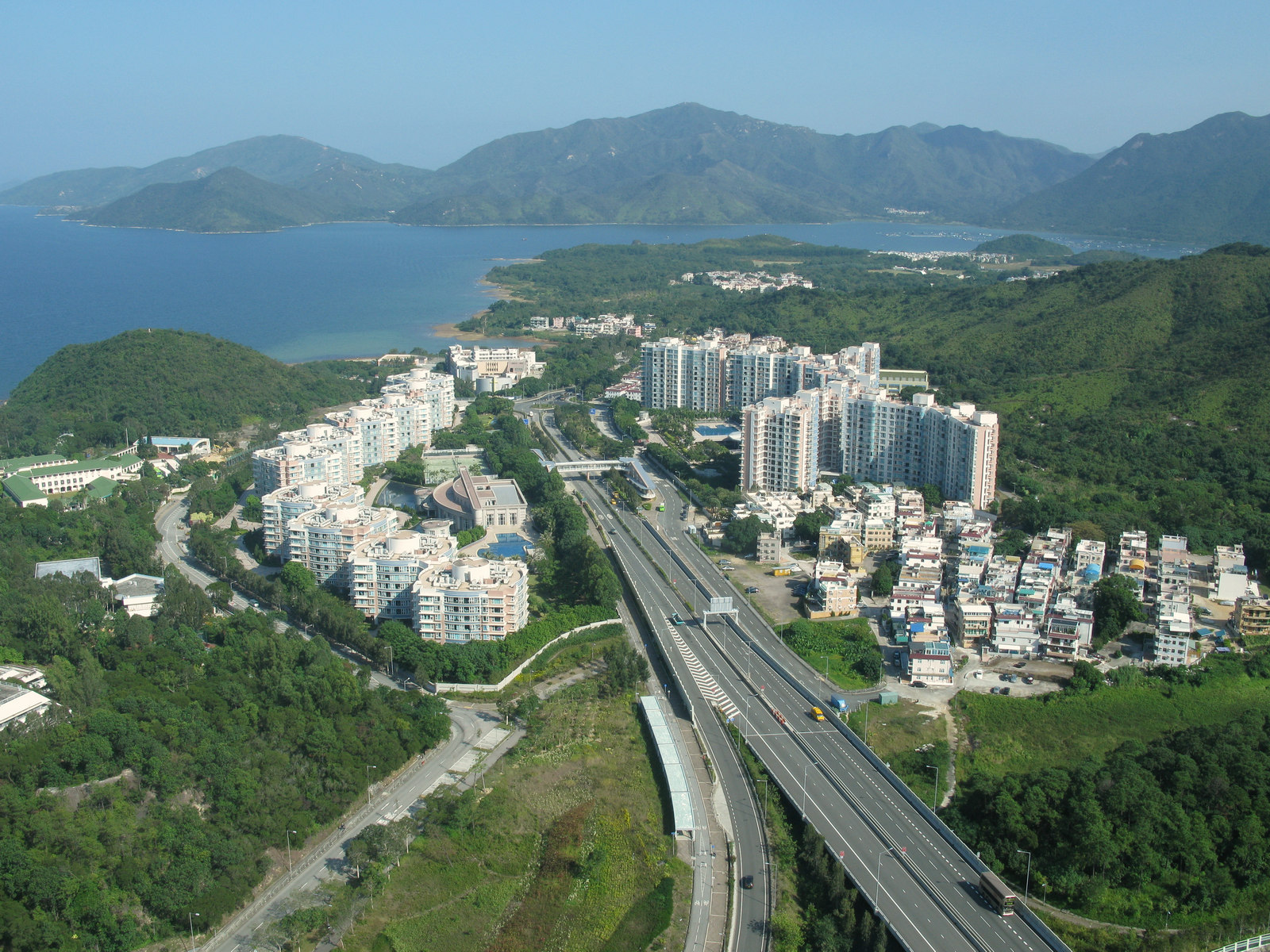
Lake Silver Chapter 6 days 65 F (43 floors) Symphony Bay the direction of the landscape
