= Wu Kai Sha station =

MTR station in the New Territories, Hong Kong

Wu Kai Sha 烏溪沙
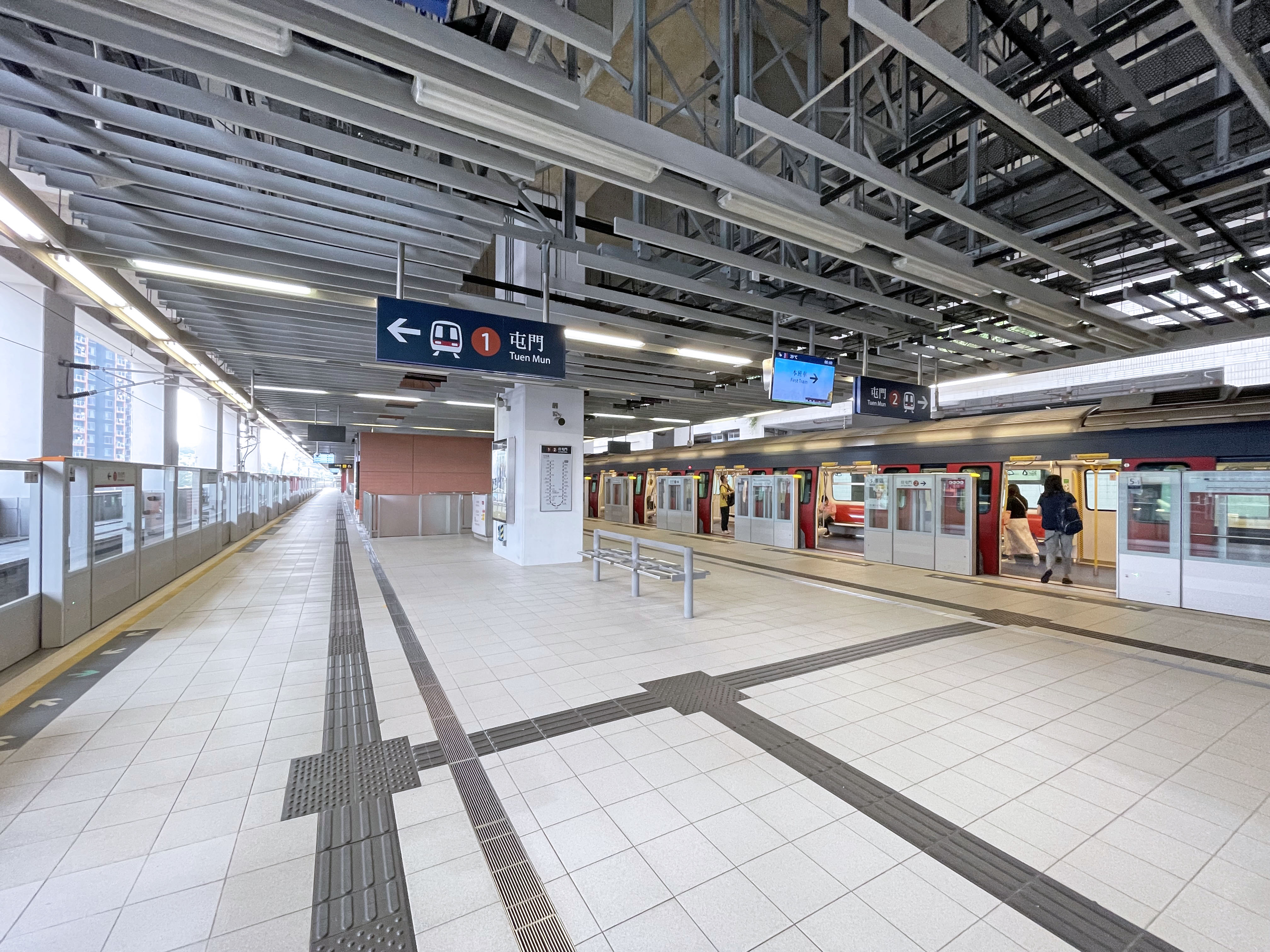
- Platforms 1 (left) and 2 (right) of Wu Kai Sha station

Chinese name
- Traditional Chinese: 烏溪沙
- Simplified Chinese: 乌溪沙
- Cantonese Yale: Wūkāisā
- Literal meaning: Blackstream Sands
Transcriptions
Standard Mandarin
- Hanyu Pinyin: Wūxīshā
Yue: Cantonese
- Yale Romanization: Wūkāisā
- Jyutping: Wu1kai1saa1

General information
- Location: Adjacent to Lake Silver, Sai Sha Road, Ma On Shan; Sha Tin District, New Territories, Hong Kong (special administrative region)
- Coordinates: 22°25′45″N 114°14′38″E
- System: MTR rapid transit station
- Owner: KCR Corporation
- Operator: MTR Corporation
- Line: Tuen Ma line
- Platforms: 2 (1 island platform)
- Tracks: 2
- Connections: Bus, minibus

Construction
- Structure type: Elevated
- Platform levels: 1
- Accessible: yes

Other information
- Station code: WKS

History
- Opened: 21 December 2004; 21 years ago

Services
Preceding station	MTR	Following station
Ma On Shan towards Tuen Mun	Tuen Ma line	Terminus
Track layout
Location
- Location within MTR

Wu Kai Sha is the northeastern terminus of the Tuen Ma line of the MTR rail transit system in Hong Kong. It is located between Sai Sha Road and Sha On Street in Lok Wo Sha, also identified with Wu Kai Sha to its west and northwest, serving the many housing estates and schools nearby.

== History ==
As part of the Kowloon-Canton Railway Corporation's Ma On Shan Rail plans, Lee On station was to be constructed on undeveloped land at the end of the railway reserve running through Sha Tin New Town. The land was mostly flat and barren; it had previously been used as a borrow pit. Adjacent to the station facilities, a public transport interchange, a property development connected to the station and an access road would be constructed. Sai Sha Road would be realigned and its adjacent cycle tracks and footpaths would be reprovisioned. The Chief Executive in Council authorised the Ma On Shan Rail project in October 2000, and construction began on 12 February 2001.

During planning and construction, the station was named "Lee On station", for its proximity to the Lee On Estate on its southwest.

On 21 December 2004, Wu Kai Sha station officially opened for passenger service with the other KCR Ma On Shan Rail stations. Initially, 4-car trains operated between Tai Wai and Wu Kai Sha, with a headway of every 3 minutes during peak hours. The journey from end to end took about 16 minutes. The property development, the private housing estate Lake Silver, was completed in 2009.

Upon the MTR–KCR merger on 2 December 2007, the MTR Corporation took over the railway operations of the KCR.

As part of the related works of the Shatin to Central Link project, work began in 2012 to retrofit Ma On Shan line stations to fit 8-car trains, and automatic platform gates were installed at stations on the line beginning in November 2014. The works were carried out at night, outside of the line's operating hours. By 2015, the extension of the overrun viaduct and the roof over the platforms at Wu Kai Sha station had been completed. The works on the Ma On Shan line were completed in December 2017, following the introduction of 8-car trains and the installation of platform gates at all stations.

As part of the main works of the Shatin to Central Link project, the Ma On Shan line was extended to Kai Tak and rebranded the Tuen Ma line phase 1 on 14 February 2020; the line was fully opened on 27 June 2021, when it was extended to Hung Hom and absorbed the West Rail line. Wu Kai Sha station remained the northeastern terminus of the extended line, the Tuen Ma line.

== Station layout ==
P	Platform 1	← Tuen Ma line towards Tuen Mun (Ma On Shan)
P	Island platform, doors will open on the left, right
P	Platform 2	← Tuen Ma line towards Tuen Mun (Ma On Shan)
C	Concourse	Exits A1 and B, transport interchange, toilets
C	Concourse	Customer services, vending machines, MTRShops
C	Concourse	Footbridge to Sai Sha Road
G	Ground level	Exit A2 (Sai Sha Road)

== Entrances and exits ==
- A1: Double Cove
- A2: Double Cove
- B: Lake Silver

Exit A is connected to a bridge over Sai Sha Road, and serves the Double Cove housing estate, Li Po Chun United World College, and the Wu Kai Sha village. Exit B serves the bus terminus next to the station, as well as the private housing estates of Monte Vista and Lake Silver, and is within walking distance to the housing estates of Lee On Estate and Kam Lung Court, as well as the Ma On Shan Ling Liang Primary School.

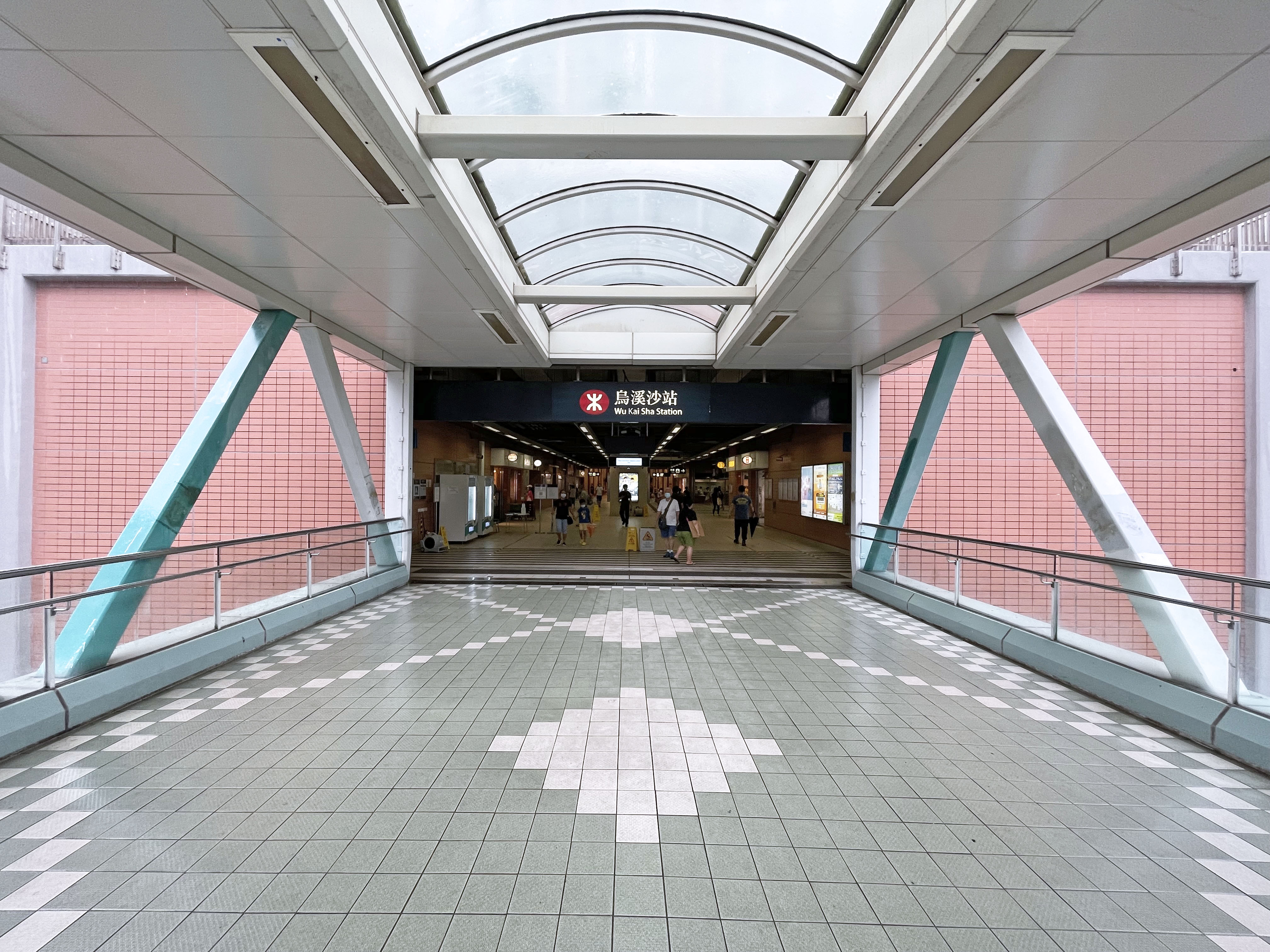
Exit A1

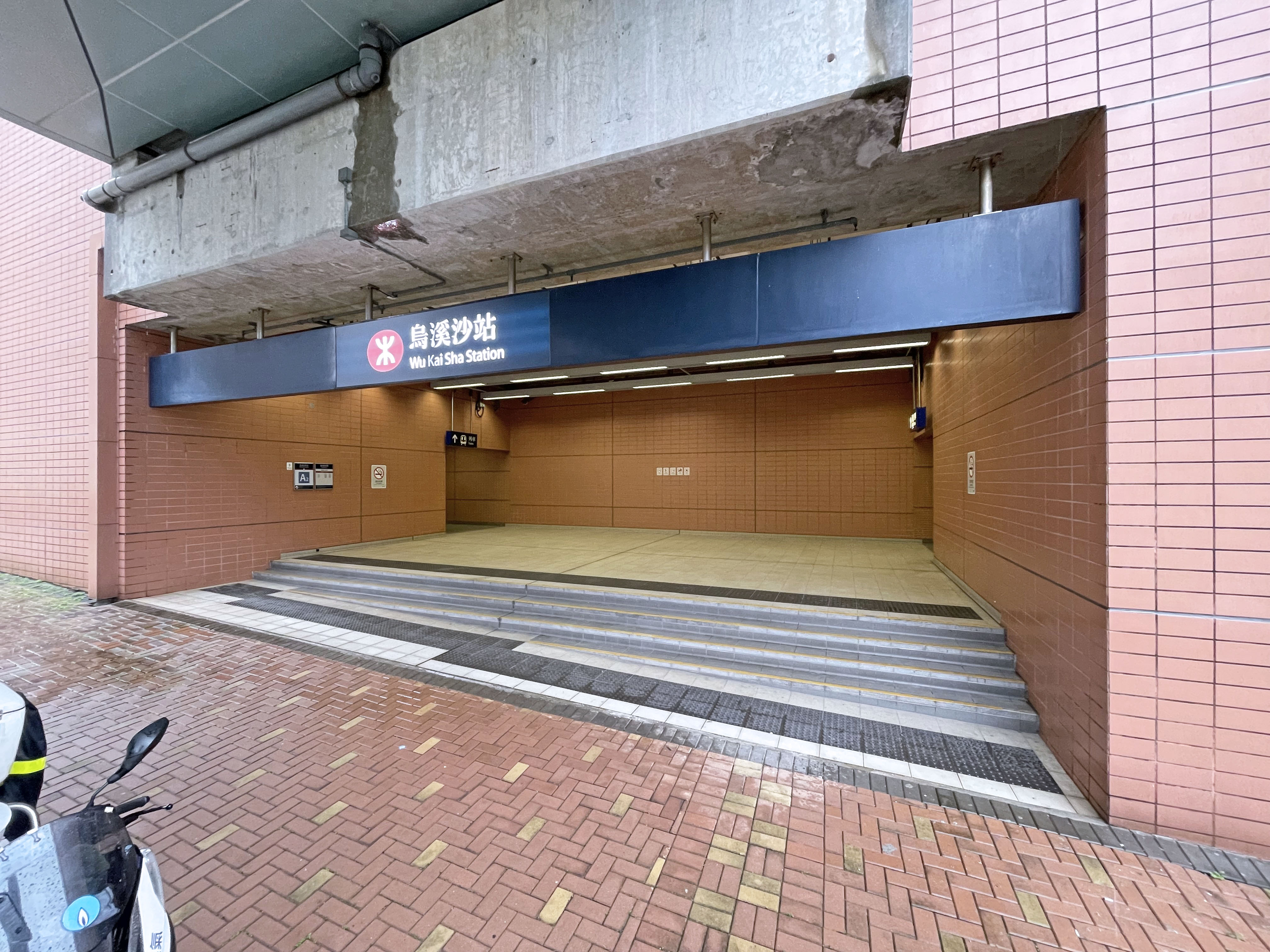
Exit A2

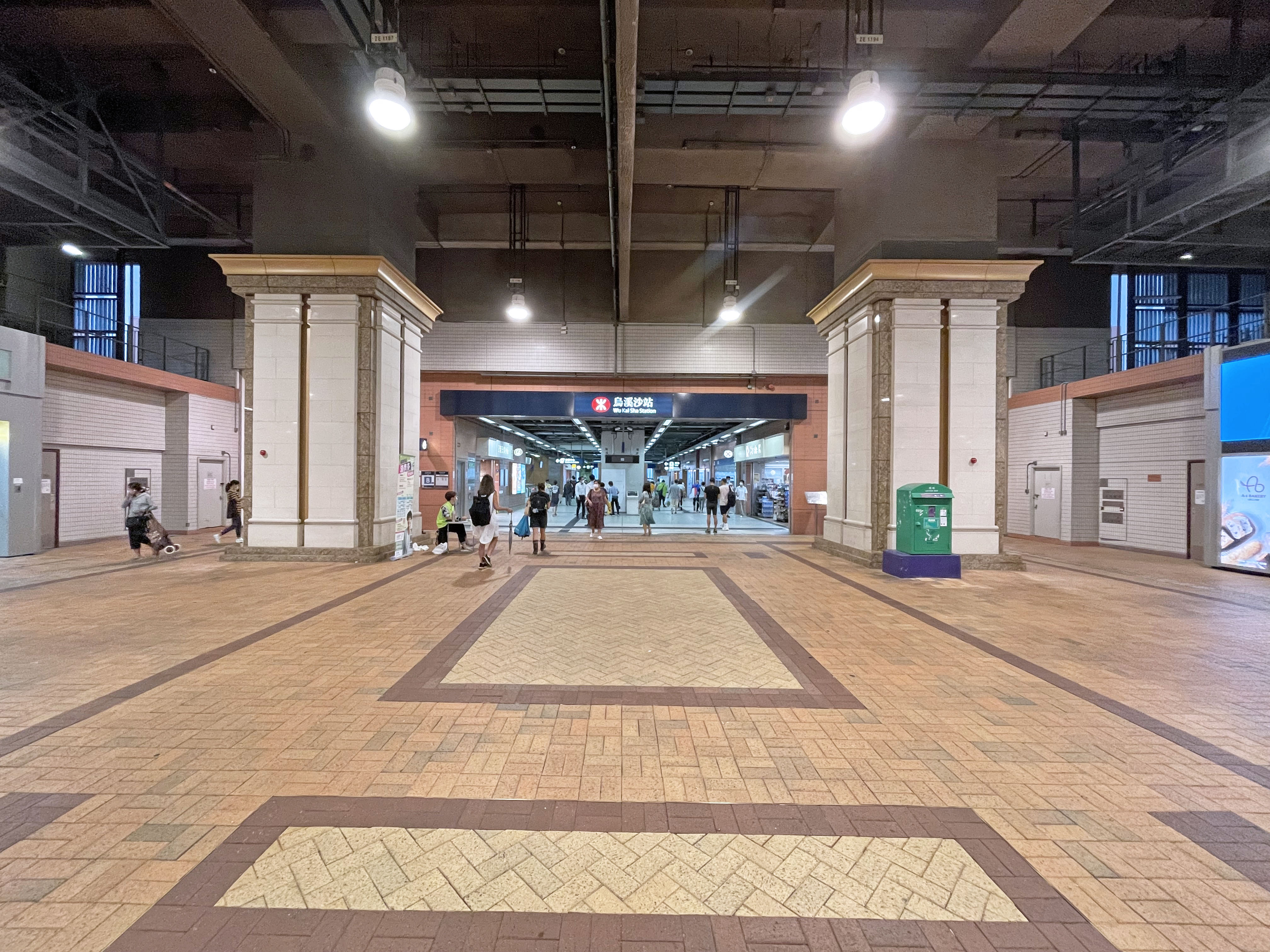
Exit B

== See also ==
- Ma On Shan
- Monte Vista
- Lake Silver
