= Fu Lung (constituency) =

Hong Kong constituency

- Elected constituency for the Sha Tin District Council
- Boundary of Fu Lung in Sha Tin District
- District: Sha Tin
- Legislative Council constituency: New Territories South East
- Population: 16,363 (2019)
- Electorate: 12,355 (2019)

Current constituency
- Created: 1994
- Number of members: One
- Member: Vacant

Fu Lung, formerly called Fu Po, is one of the 38 constituencies in the Sha Tin District in Hong Kong. The constituency returns one district councillor to the Sha Tin District Council, with an election every four years.

The Fu Lung constituency is loosely based on Saddle Ridge Garden and part of Kam Lung Court in Ma On Shan, with an estimated population of 16,363.

== Councillors represented ==
Election	Member	Party
1994	Tong Po-chun	Civil Force
1999	Law Kwong-keung	Independent
????	Law Kwong-keung	Civil Force
2014	Law Kwong-keung	NPP/CF
2015	Yen Tsang So-lai→Vacant	Democratic

== Election results ==
=== 2010s ===
Sha Tin District Council Election, 2019: Fu Lung
Party	Candidate	Votes	%	±%
Democratic	Yen Tsang So-lai	5,816	62.83	+10.23
NPP (Civil Force)	Michael Liu Tsz-chung	3,441	37.17	−10.23
Majority		2,375	25.64	
Turnout		9,291	75.22	
Democratic hold		Swing		

Sha Tin District Council Election, 2015: Fu Lung
Party	Candidate	Votes	%	±%
Democratic	Yen Tsang So-lai	3,027	52.6	
NPP (Civil Force)	Law Kwong-keung	2,730	47.4	
Majority		297	5.2	
Turnout		5,757	50.3	
Democratic gain from NPP		Swing		

Sha Tin District Council Election, 2011: Fu Lung
Party	Candidate	Votes	%	±%
Civil Force	Law Kwong-keung	uncontested		
Civil Force hold		Swing		

=== 2000s ===
Sha Tin District Council Election, 2007: Fu Lung
Party	Candidate	Votes	%	±%
Civil Force	Law Kwong-keung	3,480	80.9	+27.3
Frontier	Li Siu-ling	822	19.1	
Majority		2,658	61.8	
Civil Force hold		Swing		

Sha Tin District Council Election, 2003: Fu Lung
Party	Candidate	Votes	%	±%
Civil Force	Law Kwong-keung	3,007	57.6	−5.5
Independent	Lau Pui-wing	2,213	42.4	
Majority		794	15.2	
Civil Force hold		Swing		

=== 1990s ===
Sha Tin District Council Election, 1999: Fu Po
Party	Candidate	Votes	%	±%
Independent	Law Kwong-keung	1,857	63.1	
Independent	Cheung Ka-keung	644	21.9	
Frontier	Wong Kwun-hung	444	15.1	
Majority		1,213	31.2	
Independent gain from Civil Force		Swing		

Sha Tin District Board Election, 1994: Fu Po
Party	Candidate	Votes	%	±%
Civil Force	Tong Po-chun	1,400	60.3	
Democratic	Wong Shu-kwan	922	39.7	
Majority		478	20.6	
Civil Force win (new seat)				
