= Private housing estates in Sha Tin District =

Coordinates: 22°23′5″N 114°11′55.3″E

The following is a non-exhaustive list of private housing estates in Sha Tin District, Hong Kong.

== Tai Wai ==
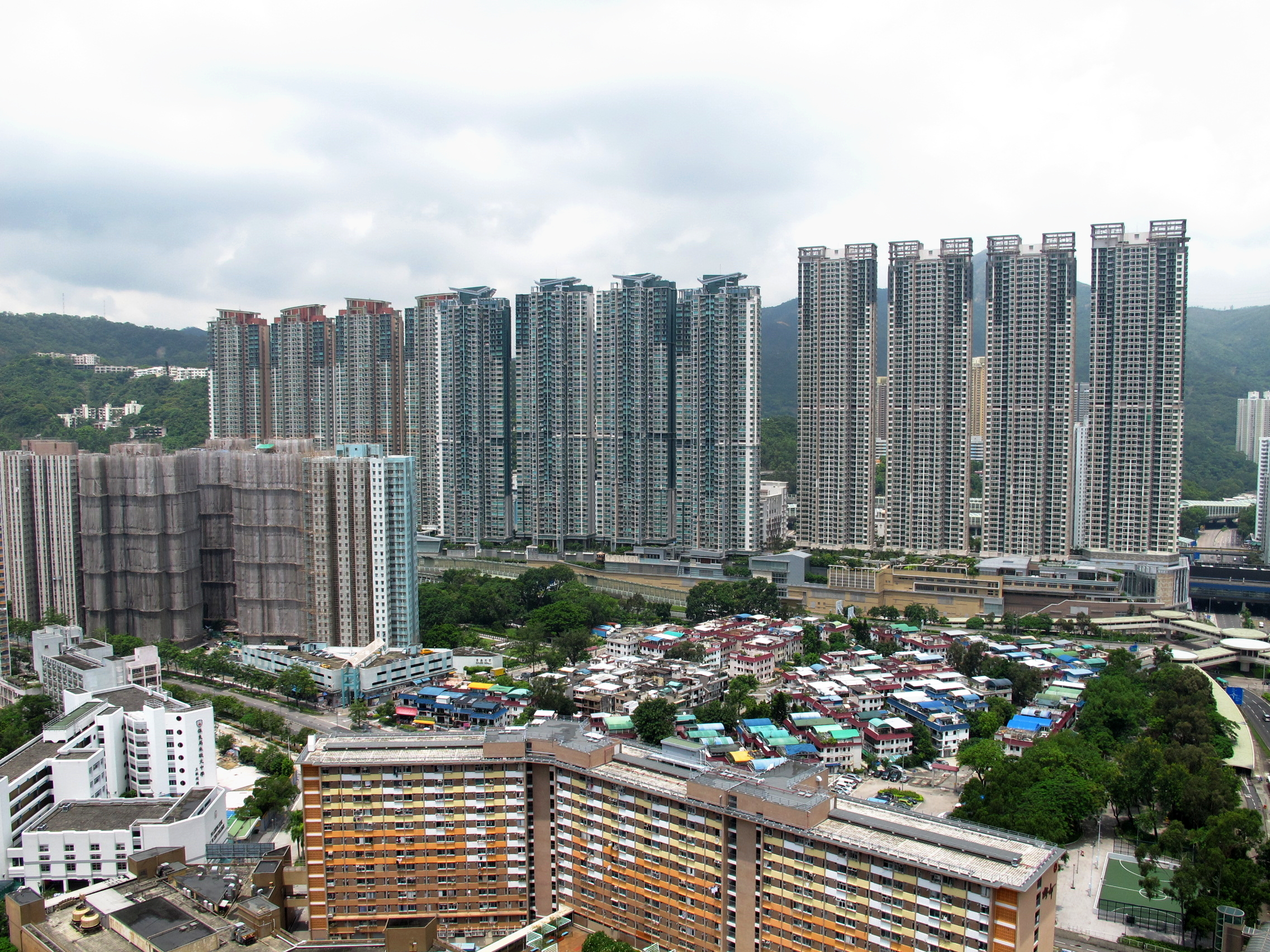
Festival City

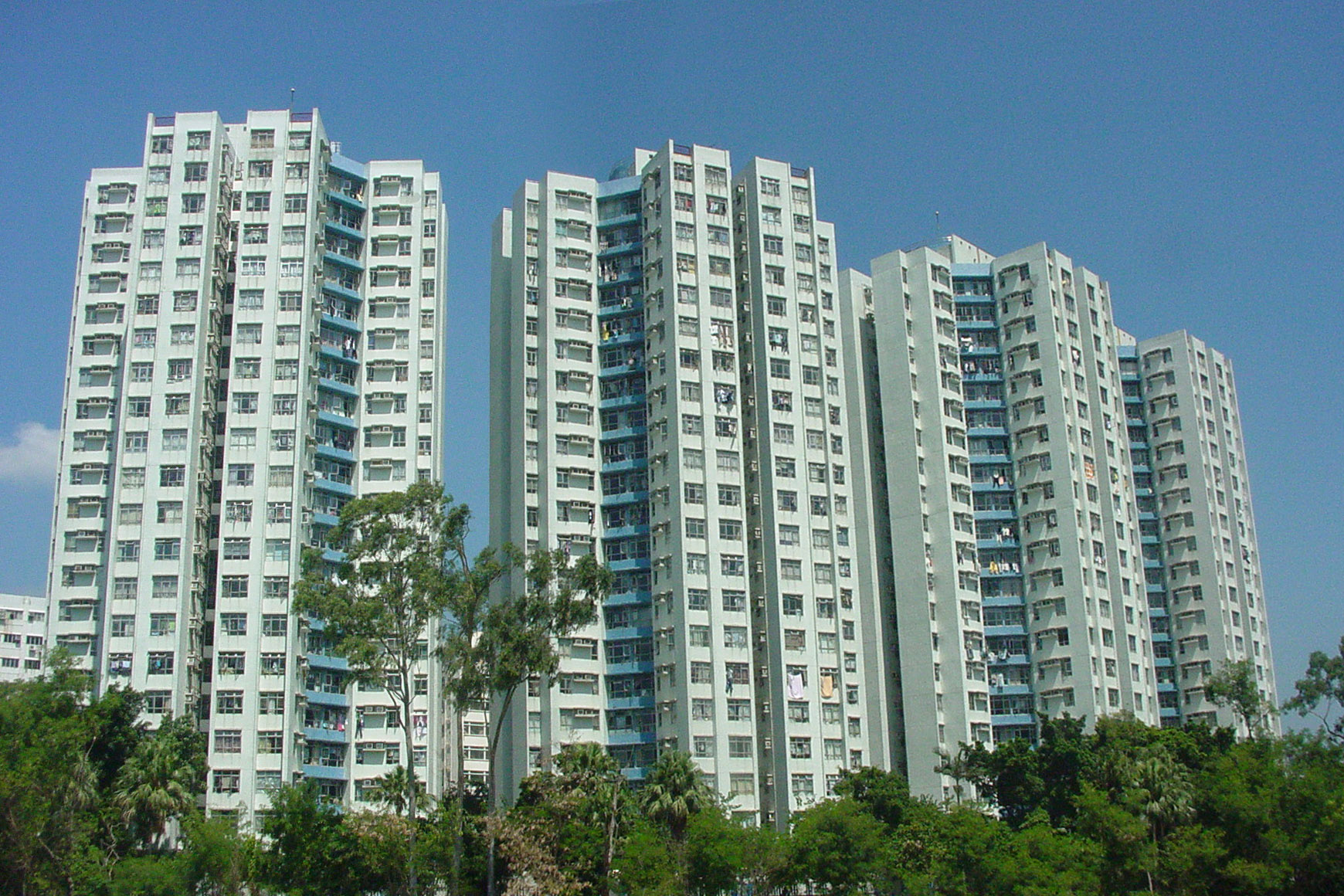
Man Lai Court

=== Festival City ===
Festival City (名城; ming4 sing4) is the largest private housing estate in Tai Wai. It is a HK$20 billion residential-commercial development project by Cheung Kong and MTR Corporation. It is located above the Tai Wai (Station) Maintenance Centre, next to Tai Wai station, which is the interchange station between the East Rail line and the Tuen Ma line of the MTR metro system. The site was formerly occupied by a football court and a public bicycle park. However, the government needed to build the Ma On Shan Line Depot in 2000, forcing the demolition of all of the facilities.

Festival City was built in three phases from 2007 to 2012. It consists of 12 buildings, a 620,000-square-foot (58,000-square-metre) clubhouse and a landscape podium. Phase I was completed in September 2010, Phase II in October 2011, and Phase III in August 2012. The plan was to build twelve 50-storey-high residential towers with a total construction area of 313,955 square metres (3,379,380 sq ft) as well as 25,890 square metres (278,700 sq ft) for the general public's use. It offers 4,264 flats to families, two schools and one community facility. This residential project raised the population of Tai Wai significantly. The controversy of this project is that the 12 towers would create an urban heat island effect and block off the air flow of the area.

=== Man Lai Court ===
Man Lai Court (文禮閣) is a private housing estate in Tai Wai, near the waterfront of Shing Mun River and Tai Wai station, which is the interchange station between the East Rail line and Tuen Ma line of the MTR metro system. Formerly the Tai Wai Staff Quarters of the Kowloon-Canton Railway Corporation, it consists of 4 buildings developed in 1990 and 1993 respectively by Cheung Kong Holdings.

=== The Pavilia Farm ===
The Pavilia Farm (柏傲莊; paak3 ngou6 zong1) is a private housing estate in Tai Wai built in 2024.

== Sha Tin ==
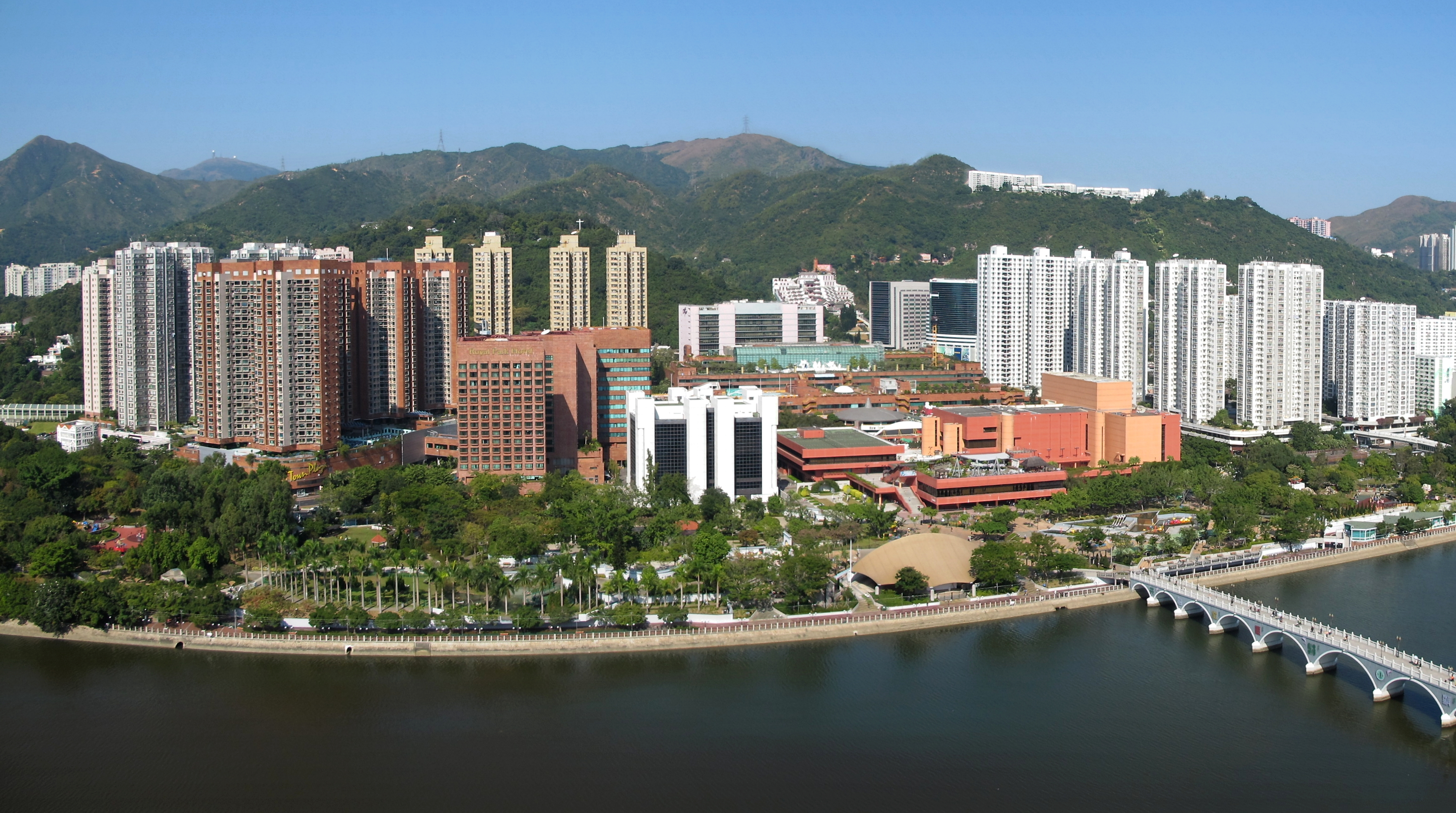
Shatin Central Residential

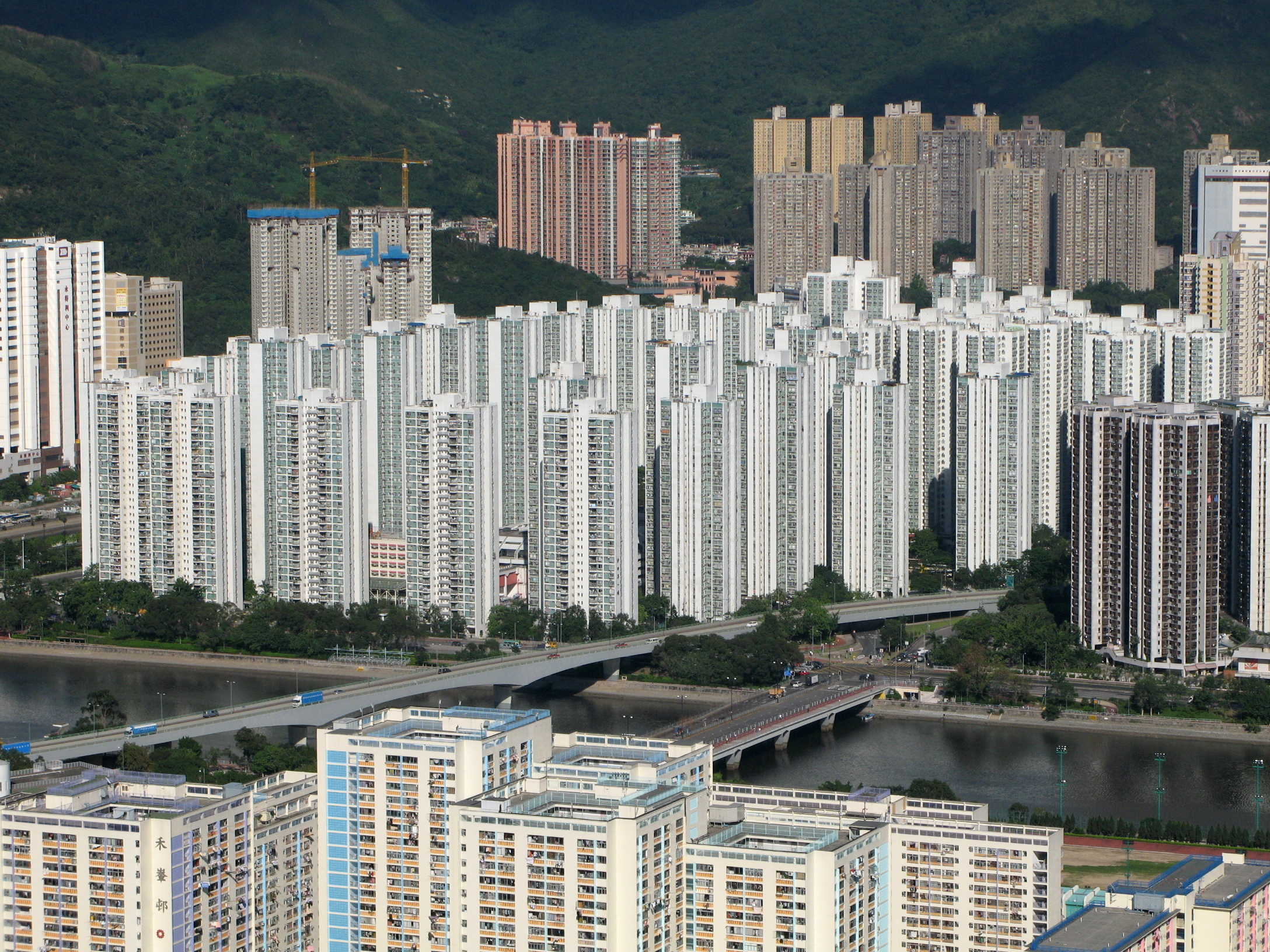
Overview of City One

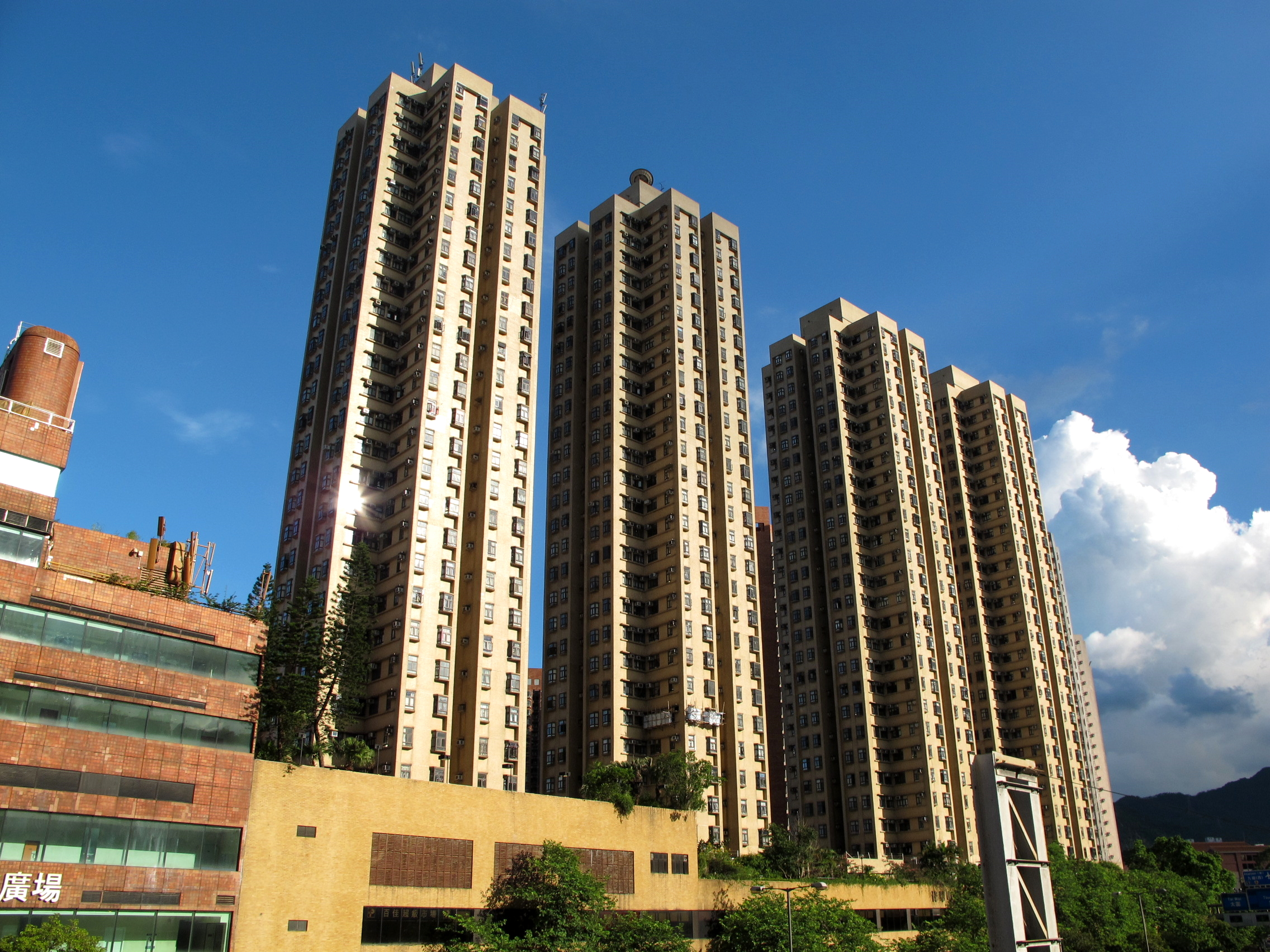
Wai Wah Centre

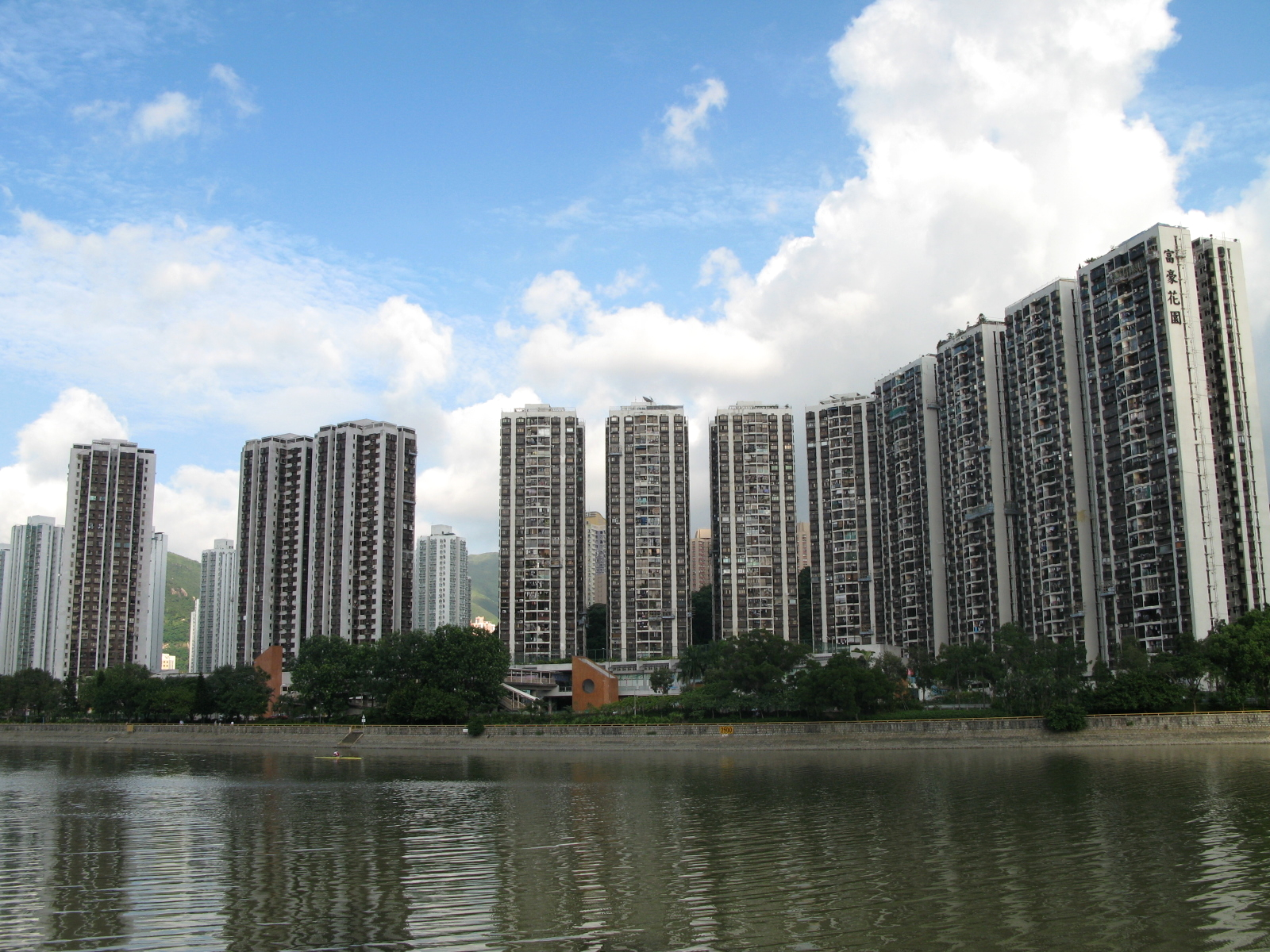
Belair Gardens

=== City One ===
City One is the largest private residential estate in Sha Tin District. There are a total of 52 blocks of residential buildings. Each tower is about 30 storeys with units ranging from 389 square feet (36.7 square metres) to an area of 1,018 square feet (94.6 square metres) with different floor plans.

=== Lucky Plaza ===
Lucky Plaza consists of 8 high-rise buildings and a shopping centre developed by Chinachem Group in 1983.

=== Sha Tin Centre ===
Sha Tin Centre comprises 8 high-rise buildings and a shopping arcade, developed by Henderson Land Development in 1981.

=== Wai Wah Centre ===
Wai Wah Centre (偉華中心) comprises 4 high-rise buildings and a shopping arcade completed in 1986, developed by Cheung Kong Holdings.

=== New Town Plaza III ===
New Town Plaza III consists of 5 high-rise buildings and a shopping mall developed by Sung Hung Kai Properties in 1990.

=== Sha Tin Plaza ===
Sha Tin Plaza comprises 4 high-rise buildings and a shopping arcade, developed by Henderson Land Development in 1988.

=== Garden Rivera ===
- Garden Rivera (河畔花園; ho4 bun6 faa1 jyun4)

=== Belair Gardens ===
Belair Gardens (富豪花園; fu3 hou4 faa1 jyun4) is a private housing estate located at 52 Tai Chung Kiu Road, Sha Tin. It stands on the banks of the Shing Mun River, next to Yuen Chau Kok. There is also a shopping mall, bowling centre, and a car park. It has 14 blocks, each block beginning with a different letter of the alphabet:

English name	Number of Rooms per Floor	Number of Floors
Admiralty Heights	4	28
Beverly Heights	4	28
Carmel Heights	4	28
Dominion Heights	4	28
Estoril Heights	4	27
Fontana Heights	4	27
Grenville Heights	4	27
Hoover Heights	4	27
Imperial Heights	8	27
Jade Heights	8	27
Kingston Heights	4	25
Lincoln Heights	4	25
Manhattan Heights	8	27
Nelly Heights	8	27

=== Castello ===
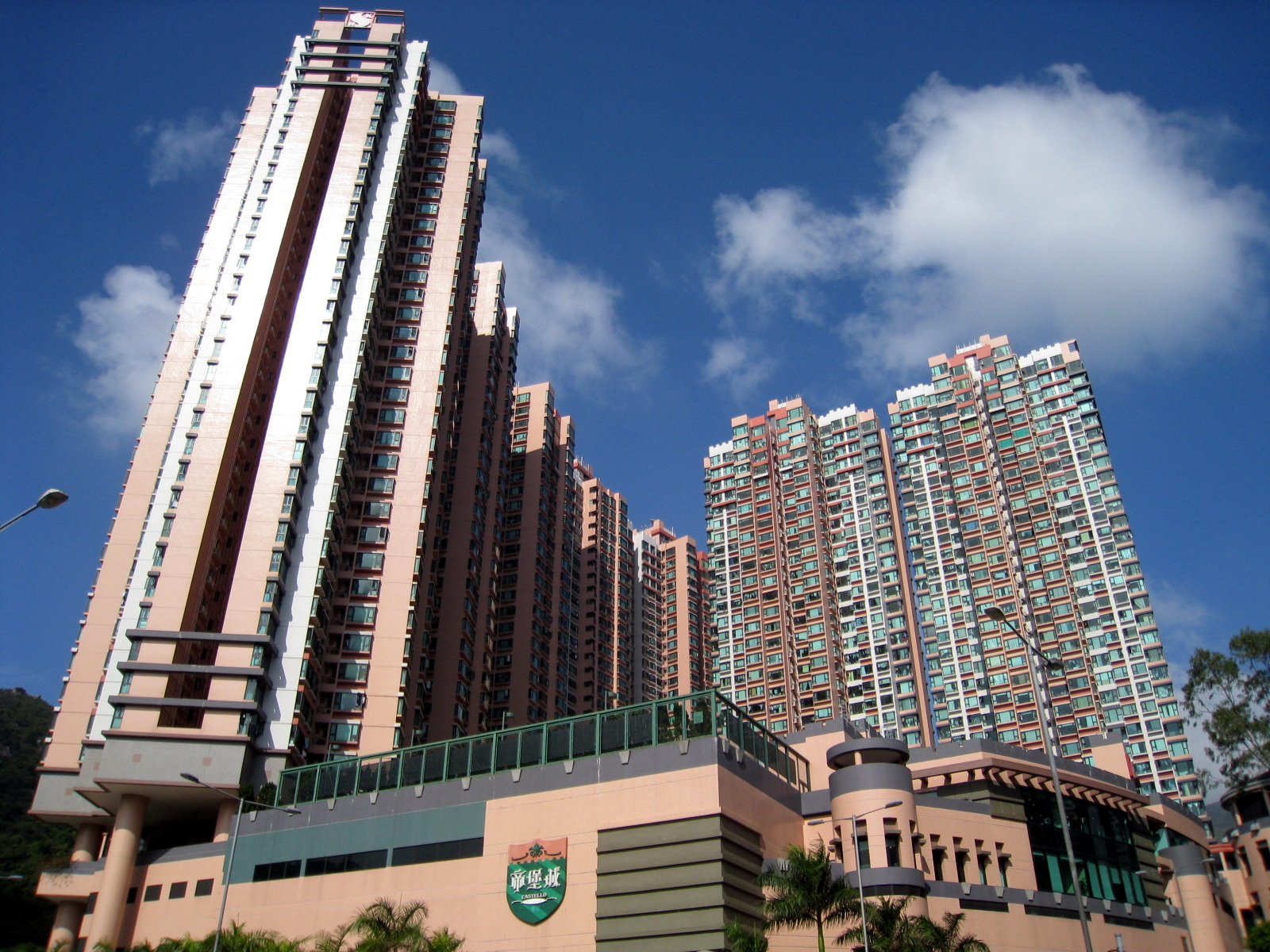
Castello

Castello (帝堡城; dai3 bou2 sing4), in Siu Lek Yuen, was developed by Sun Hung Kai Properties and designed by D. Heung & Associates. The design of the development is influenced by European castles, hence the name Castello and the iconic castellation as an architectural feature at the top of the towers and the podium. Construction work finished in December 1999. It consists of eight residential blocks with 32 floors. The tower blocks are built on top of four levels of podium which contain residential car parks and clubhouse facilities. Each block has eight flats on each floor, except Block 5 with seven flats. The flat sizes range from 718 to 1,107 square feet (66.7 to 102.8 m^{2}). Flat efficiency rate is at 83%. The smallest flats provide two bedrooms, while the biggest have three bedrooms, including one en-suite and an extra store room with toilet facilities accessed through the kitchen.

Kai Shing Management Services Limited, a subsidiary company of the developer, manages the estate. The management fee for each flat is HKD1.39 per square foot per month. The management of the estate is also monitored and supervised by a Residents' Committee elected by residents.

There is a bus station adjacent to Castello.

== Fo Tan ==
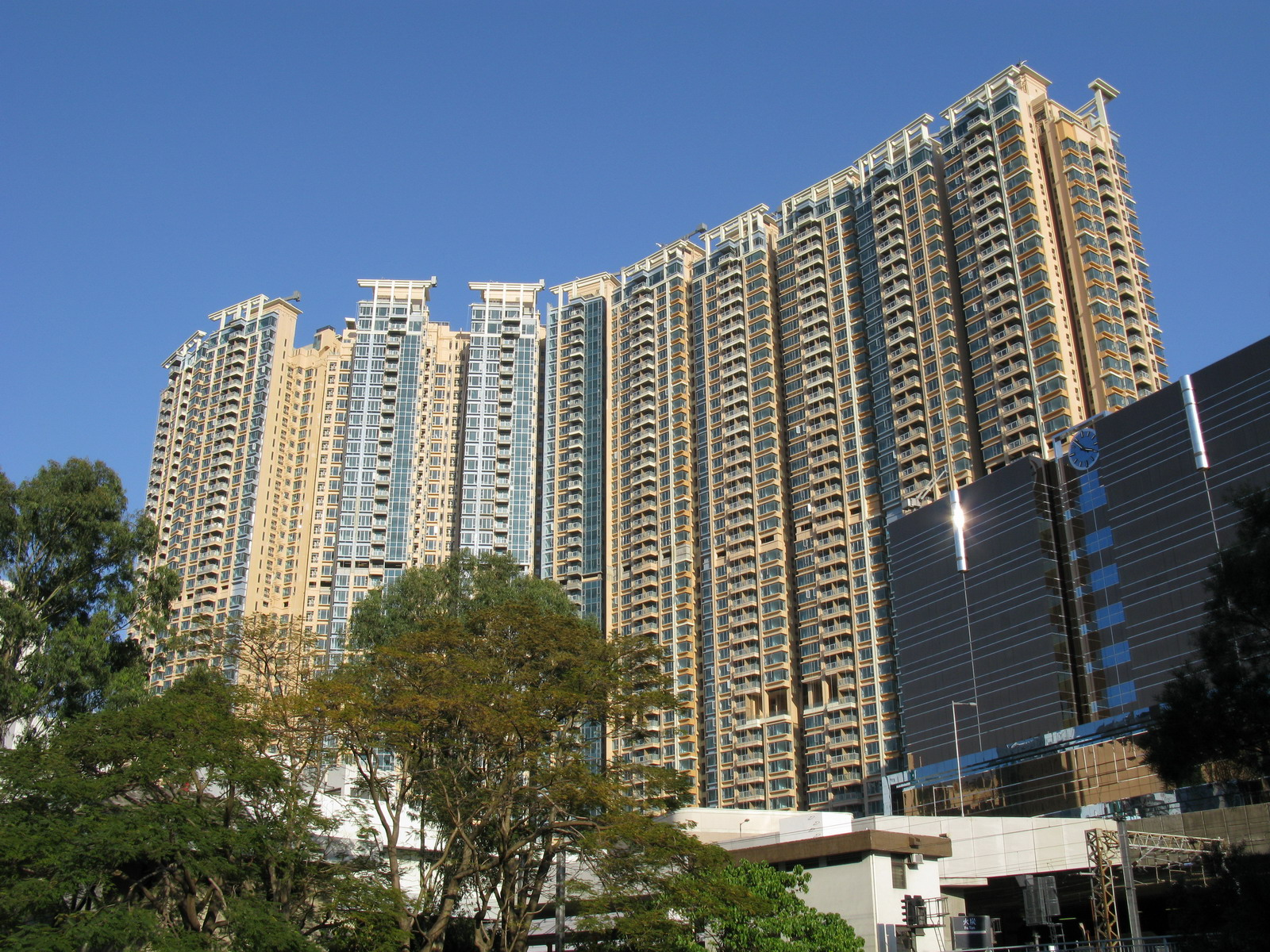
The Palazzo

=== The Palazzo ===
The Palazzo (御龍山) is a private housing estate in Fo Tan, located near Fo Tan station and right next to Sha Tin Racecourse. It comprises 10 high-rise buildings, offering a total of 1,375 units. Formerly Ho Tung Lau, it was developed by Sino Land and MTR Corporation in 2009.

== Ma On Shan ==
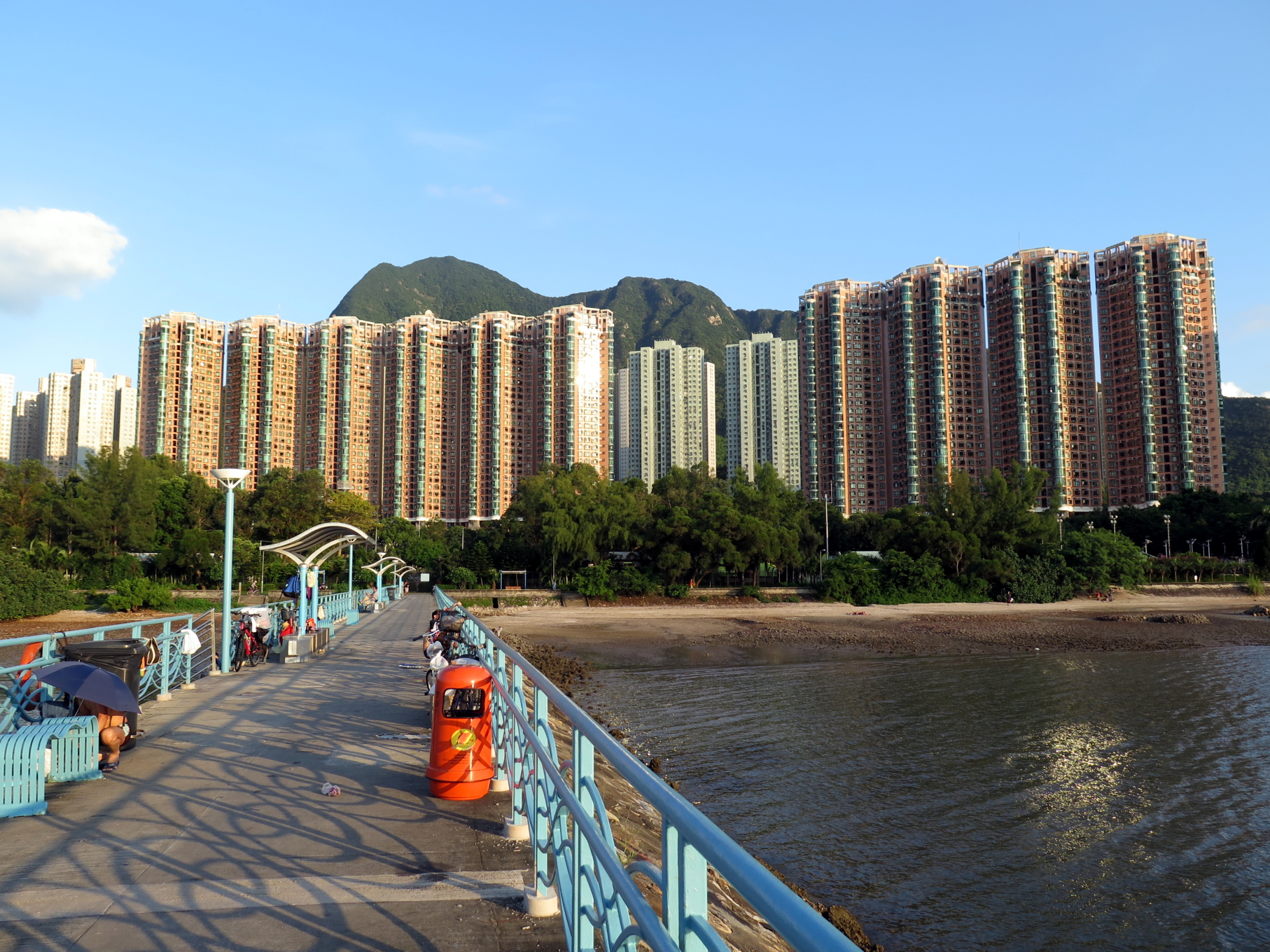
The residential towers of Villa Athena

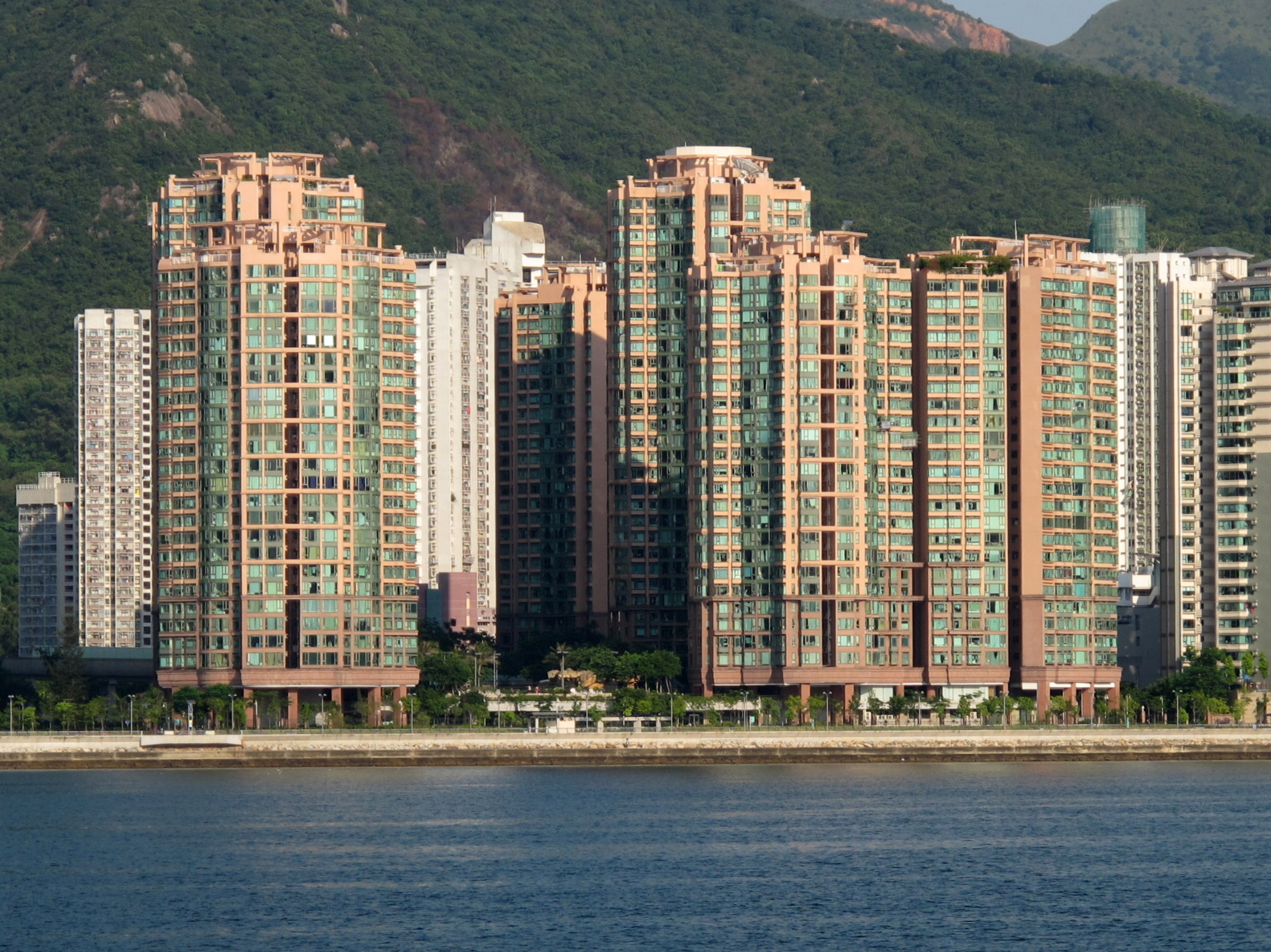
The residential towers of Vista Paradiso

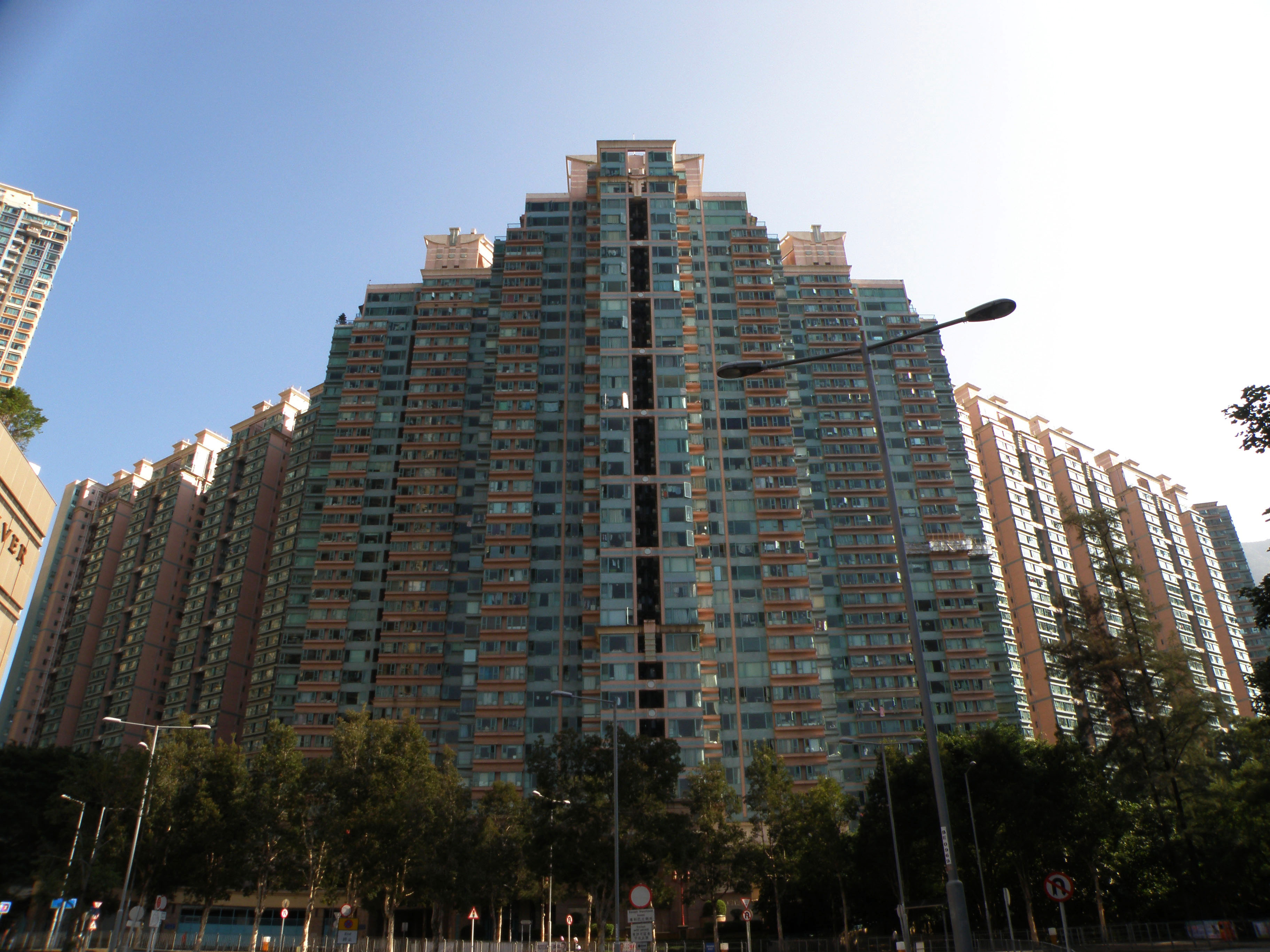
The residential towers of Monte Vista

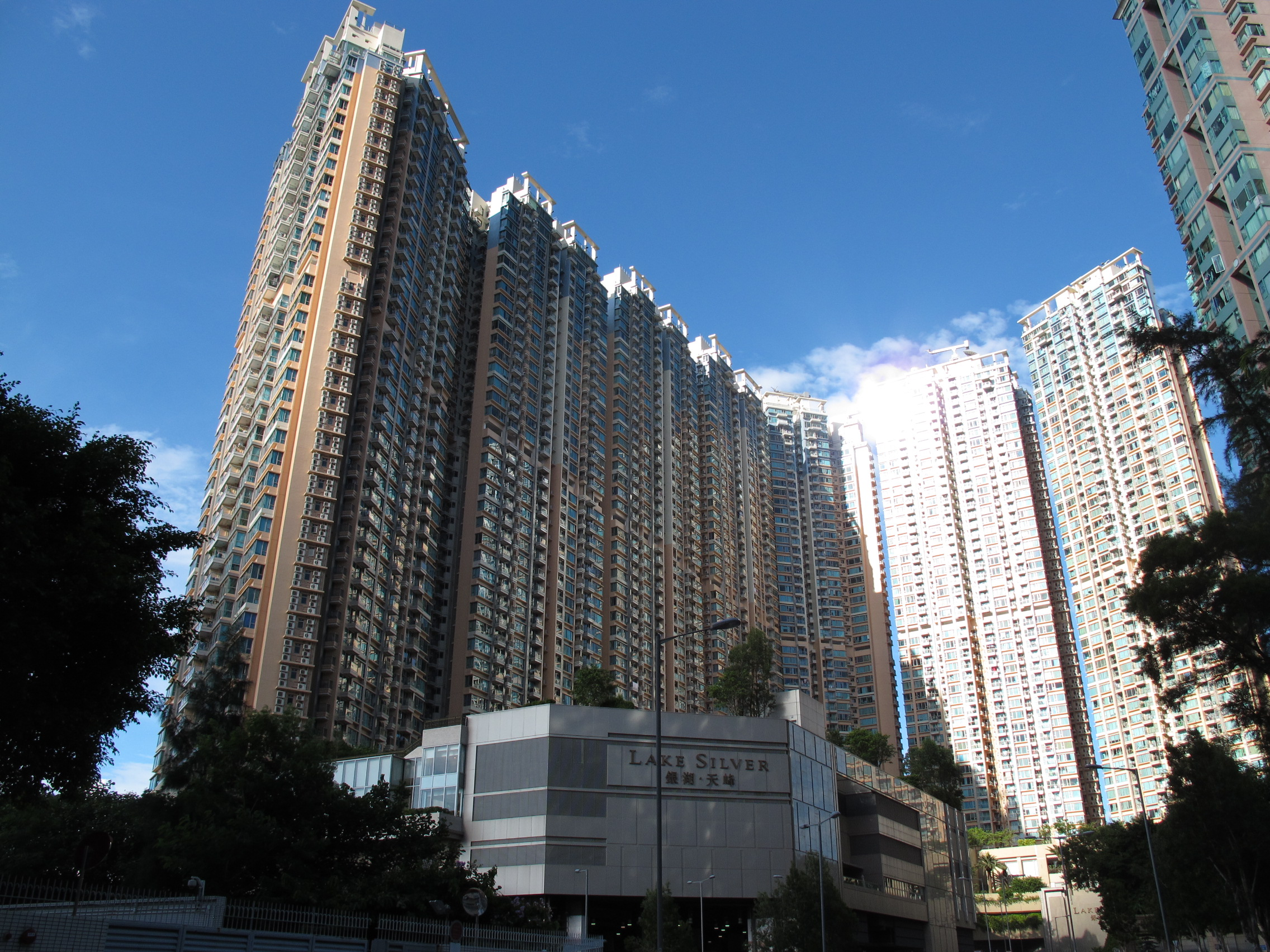
Lake Silver

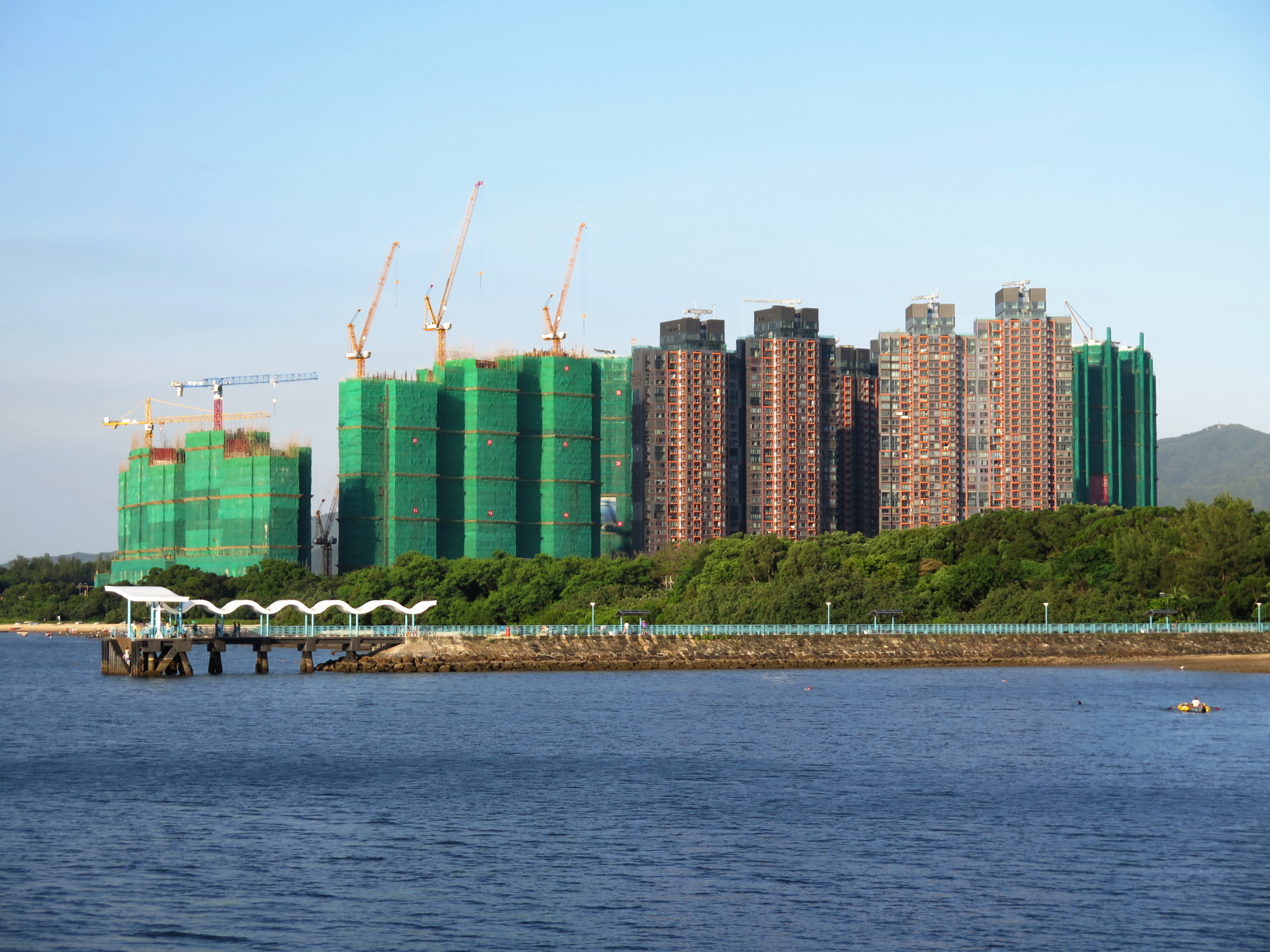
Double Cove

=== Villa Athena ===
Villa Athena is a private housing estate in Ma On Shan. It is located at 600 Sai Sha Road, a five-minute walk from the Ma On Shan station, bus interchange, and shopping centres. It was completed in 1994. It consists of 10 residential towers of 27 storeys. Each storey has four flats, two of 1,068 sq.ft., and two of 901 sq.ft. The top floor of each tower has larger flats (1,848 sq.ft.). In total, the private housing estate contains 1,180 flats.

The estate was built by Sun Hung Kai Properties. Villa Athena has a free residential bus service to Sunshine City and Sha Tin. All rooms in the larger flats have sea views. Villa Athena has the highest gross size to net size ratio in Ma On Shan, at 81.5% (compared to 80.5% for Vista Paradiso (see below), 77.5% for Monte Vista, 76% for Sunshine City and 74.5% for Bayshore Tower).

=== Vista Paradiso ===
Vista Paradiso (聽濤雅苑; ting1 tou4 ngaa5 jyun2) is a private housing estate in Ma On Shan. It is situated next to the Heng On station on the MTR Tuen Ma line.

Vista Paradiso was completed in 1998. It consists of 11 residential towers, with number of floors ranging from 29 to 37. In total, the private housing estate contains 2,032 flats. Buyers showed renewed interest in Vista Paradiso in 2006 due to its proximity to newly opened international schools.

=== Monte Vista ===
Monte Vista (翠擁華庭; ceoi3 jung2 waa4 ting4) is private housing estate in Ma On Shan. It is situated at 9 Sha On Street and is right next to the Wu Kai Sha station on the MTR Tuen Ma line.

The estates were built by Hutchison Whampoa, together with Bayshore Tower, as part of a triple development project in Ma On Shan.

Monte Vista was completed in 2000 and consists of 12 residential towers. Each tower has 37 floors. In total, the private housing estate contains 1,606 flats. 100 units were sold in the first day of public sales in April 2000, the second-highest first-day sales figure for a property development so far that year after The Waterfront. In two days in July, 108 units were sold; 3-bedroom units were especially popular among property buyers. Transaction prices were in the range of HK$3,200 to HK$3,600 per square foot. By the following year, three dual-level penthouse suites remained unsold, and were being offered by the developer at an average price of HK$4,718 per square foot.

=== Lake Silver ===
Another project adjacent to Monte Vista developed by Sino Land is Lake Silver, formerly Lake W, comprises 7 residential blocks with a total of 2,189 units completed in 2009.

=== Baycrest ===
Baycrest is an estate comprising six residential blocks, providing 618 flats, near Heng On station.

=== Double Cove ===
Double Cove (迎海) is a large private housing estate in Wu Kai Sha, near Wu Kai Sha station and Whitehead camp. When fully completed, it will comprise 21 housing blocks offering 3,500 flats. The developers are Henderson Land and New World Development.

The housing blocks are arranged around a large clubhouse and a two-storey shopping arcade called Double Cove Place (迎海薈; jing4 hoi2 wai3). A walkway, open 24-hours, runs the length of the site connecting to the MTR station and the public transport interchange.

== See also ==
- Private housing estates in Hong Kong
