= Lee On Estate =

Public housing estate in Ma On Shan, Hong Kong

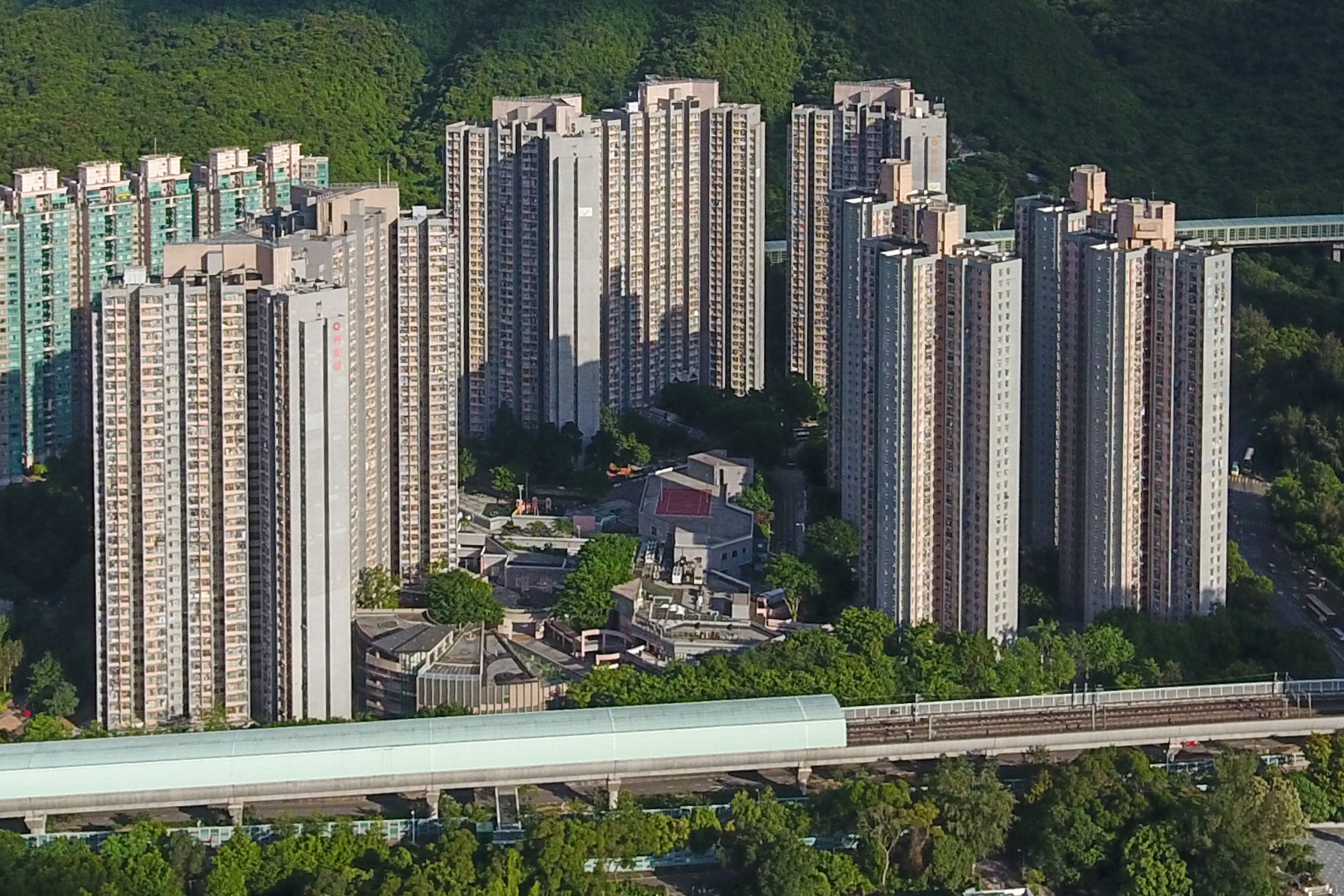
- Overview of Lee On Estate
- Interactive map of Lee On Estate

General information
- Location: 23 Sha On Street, Ma On Shan; New Territories, Hong Kong
- Coordinates: 22.4260°N 114.2418°E
- Status: Completed
- Category: Public rental housing
- Population: 11,159 (2016)
- No. of blocks: 5
- No. of units: 3,632

Construction
- Constructed: 1993; 33 years ago
- Authority: Hong Kong Housing Authority

Lee On Estate (Chinese: 利安邨) is a public housing estate in Wu Kai Sha, Ma On Shan, New Territories, Hong Kong near MTR Wu Kai Sha station. It is the third public housing estate in Ma On Shan. It consists of five residential buildings completed in 1993 and 1994.

Kam Lung Court (錦龍苑) is a Home Ownership Scheme court in Ma On Shan, near Lee On Estate. It consists of four blocks built in 1993.

== Houses ==
=== Lee On Estate ===
Name	Chinese name	Building type	Completed
Lee Fung House	利豐樓	Harmony 2	1993
Lee Shing House	利盛樓	Harmony 2	1993
Lee Hing House	利興樓	Harmony 2	1993
Lee Wah House	利華樓	Harmony 2	1994
Lee Wing House	利榮樓	Harmony 2	1994

=== Kam Lung Court ===
Name	Chinese name	Building type	Completed
Lung Yuet House	龍悅閣	NCB (Ver.1984)	1993
Lung Yan House	龍欣閣	NCB (Ver.1984)	1993
Lung Yiu House	龍耀閣	NCB (Ver.1984)	1993
Lung Sing House	龍昇閣	NCB (Ver.1984)	1993

== Demographics ==
According to the 2016 by-census, Lee On Estate had a population of 11,159 while Kam Lung Court had a population of 3,712. Altogether the population amounts to 14,871.

== Politics ==
For the 2019 District Council election, the estate fell within two constituencies. Lee On Estate is located in the Lee On constituency, which is represented by Chris Mak Yun-pui, while Kam Lung Court falls within the Fu Lung constituency, which is represented by Yen Tsang So-lai.

== COVID-19 pandemic ==
Lee Shing House was placed under lockdown on 13 February, 2022.

== See also ==
- Public housing estates in Ma On Shan
