= Ma On Shan Park =

Public park in Ma On Shan, Hong Kong

Coordinates: 22.4269°N 114.2306°E

- 馬鞍山公園
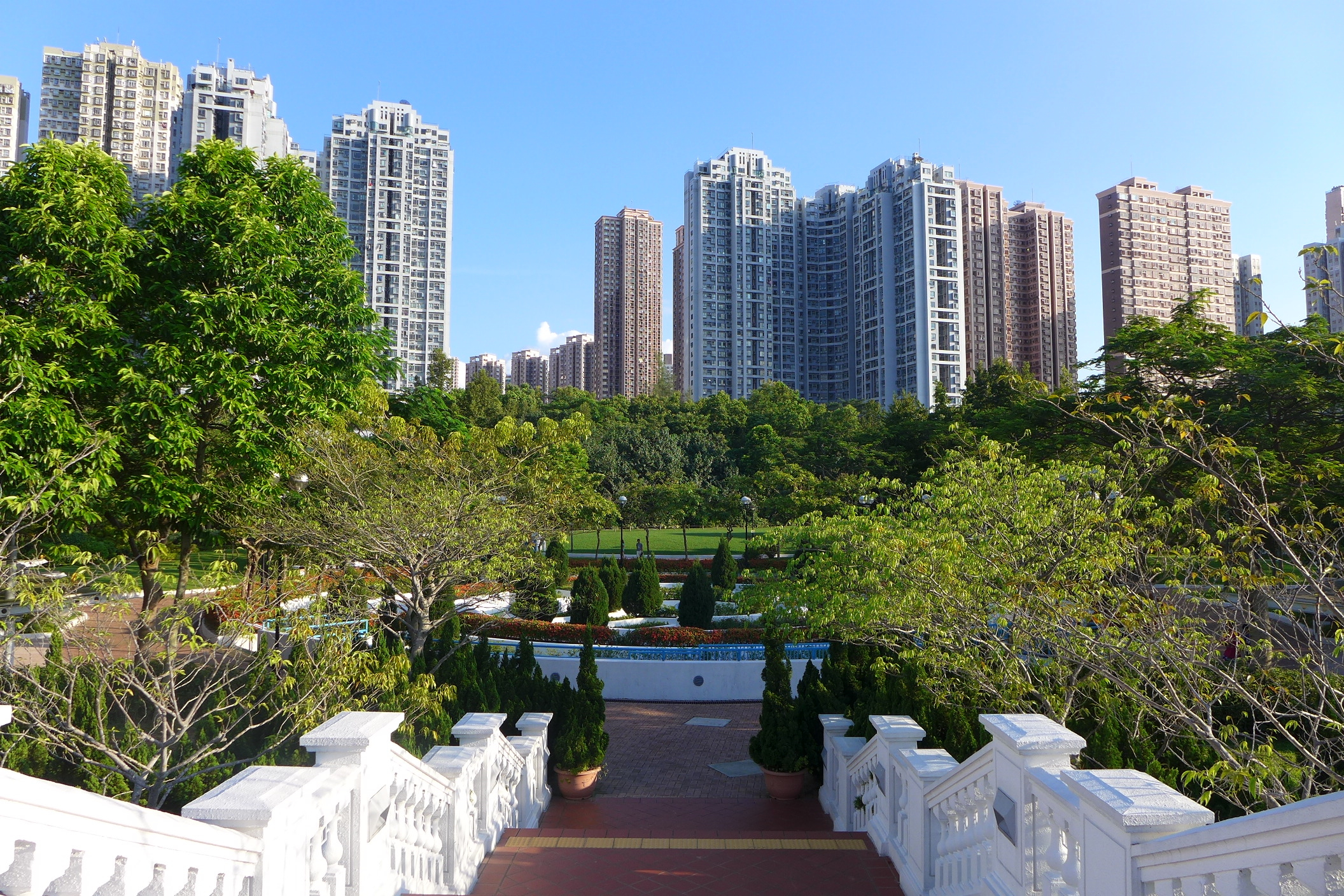
- Vista of the park
- Interactive map of Ma On Shan Park
- Location: 12 On Chun Street, Ma On Shan, Sha Tin District, New Territories, Hong Kong
- Area: 5.5 hectares (14 acres)
- Opened: 3 August 1998; 27 years ago
- Owner: Hong Kong Government
- Manager: Leisure and Cultural Services Department
- Public transit: Ma On Shan station

Ma On Shan Park
- Traditional Chinese: 馬鞍山公園
- Simplified Chinese: 马鞍山公园
Transcriptions
Standard Mandarin
- Hanyu Pinyin: Mǎ'ānshān Gōngyuán
Yue: Cantonese
- Yale Romanization: Máah ōn sāan gūng yùhn
- Jyutping: Maa5 on1 saan1 gung1 jyun4

Ma On Shan Park is a public park located at 12 On Chun Street in the town centre of Ma On Shan town in the Sha Tin District of Hong Kong's New Territories. It is situated next to the shopping centre of Ma On Shan Plaza. The natural scenery of Pat Sin Leng and Tolo Harbour can be viewed from the park. The park occupies 5.5 hectares (14 acres) of land, and is managed by the Leisure and Cultural Services Department. The opening hours are from 6:30 am to 11:00 pm.

== Gallery ==
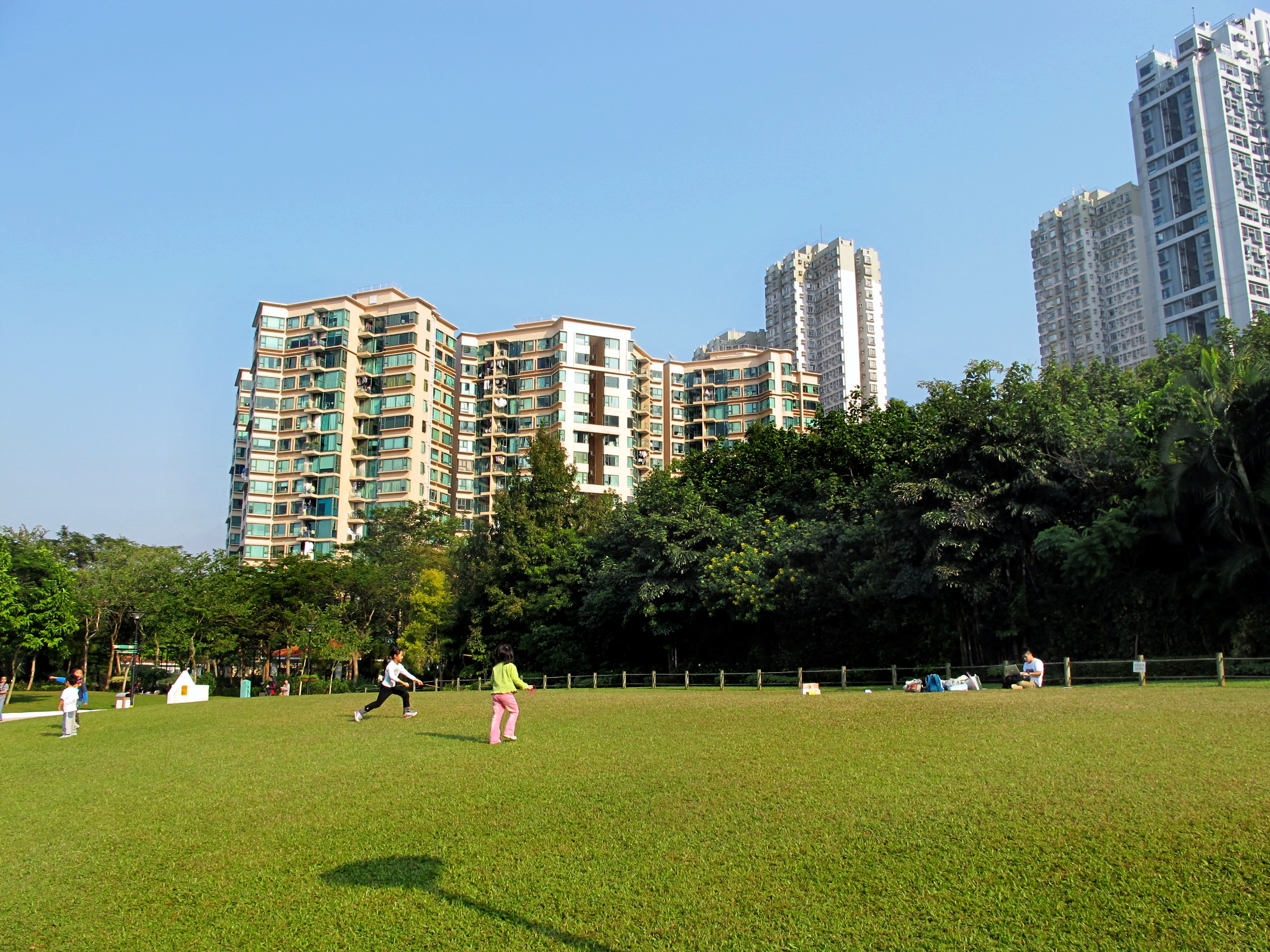
Central Lawn

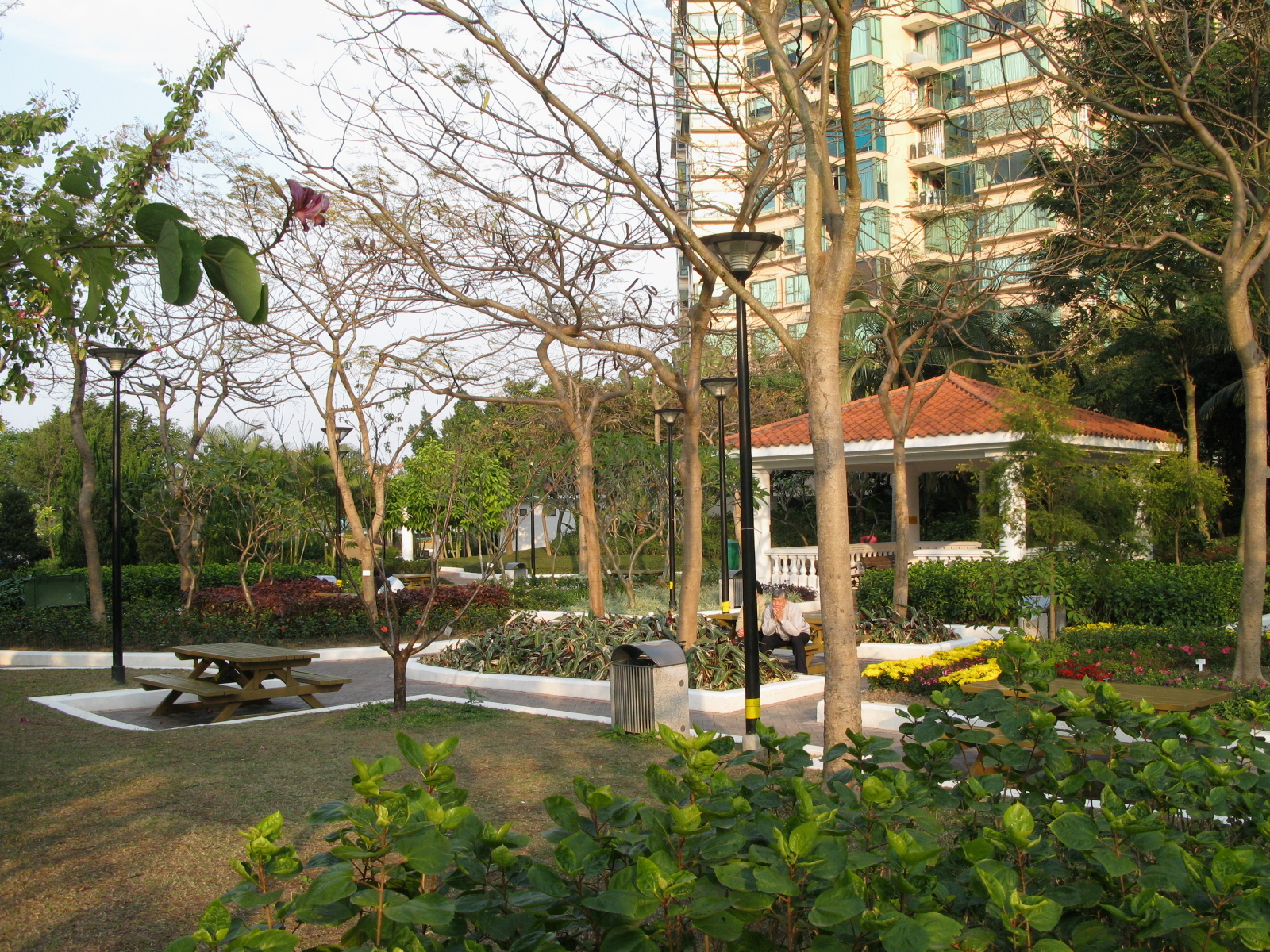
Sitting Out Area

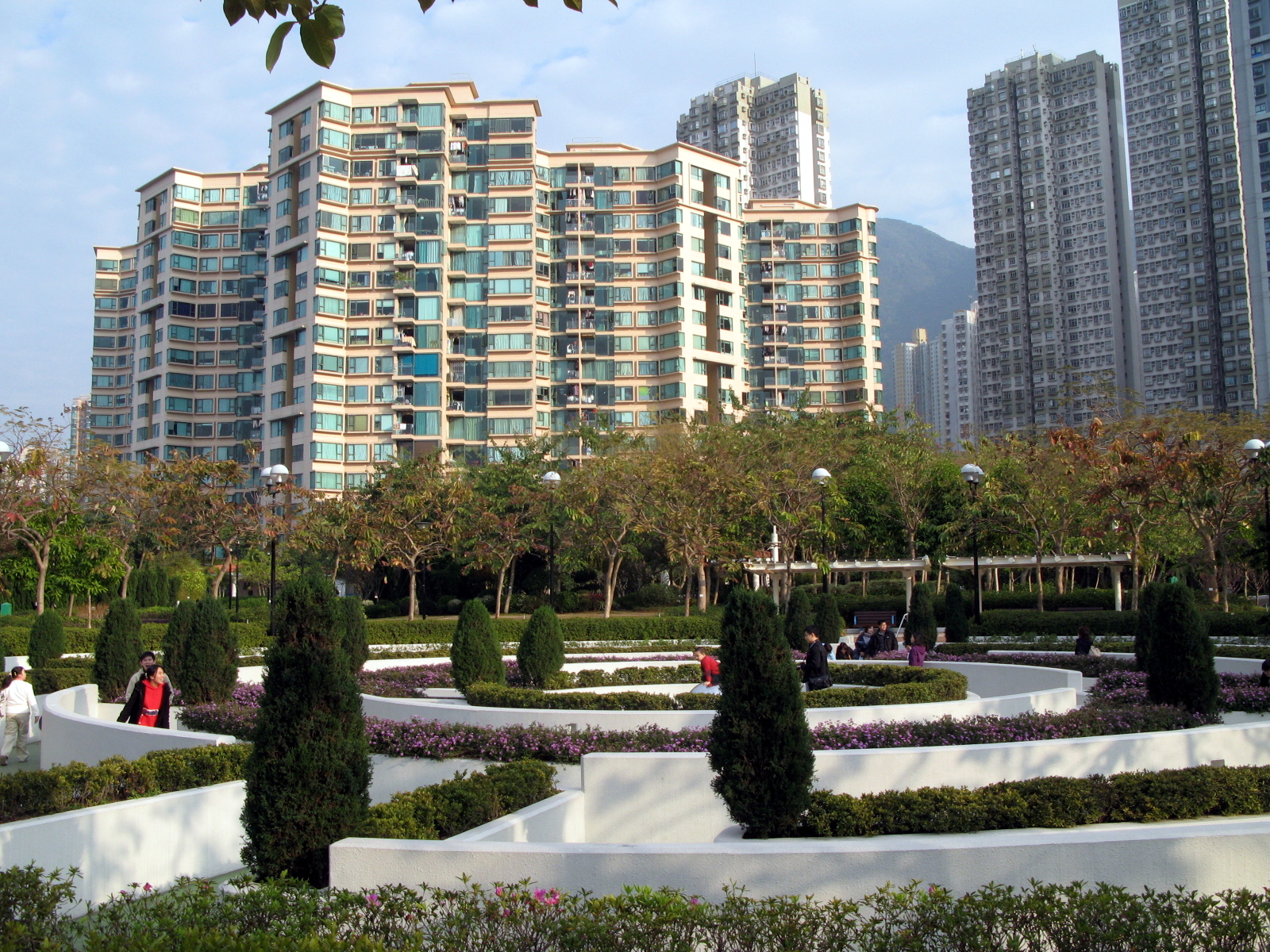
Adventure Maze

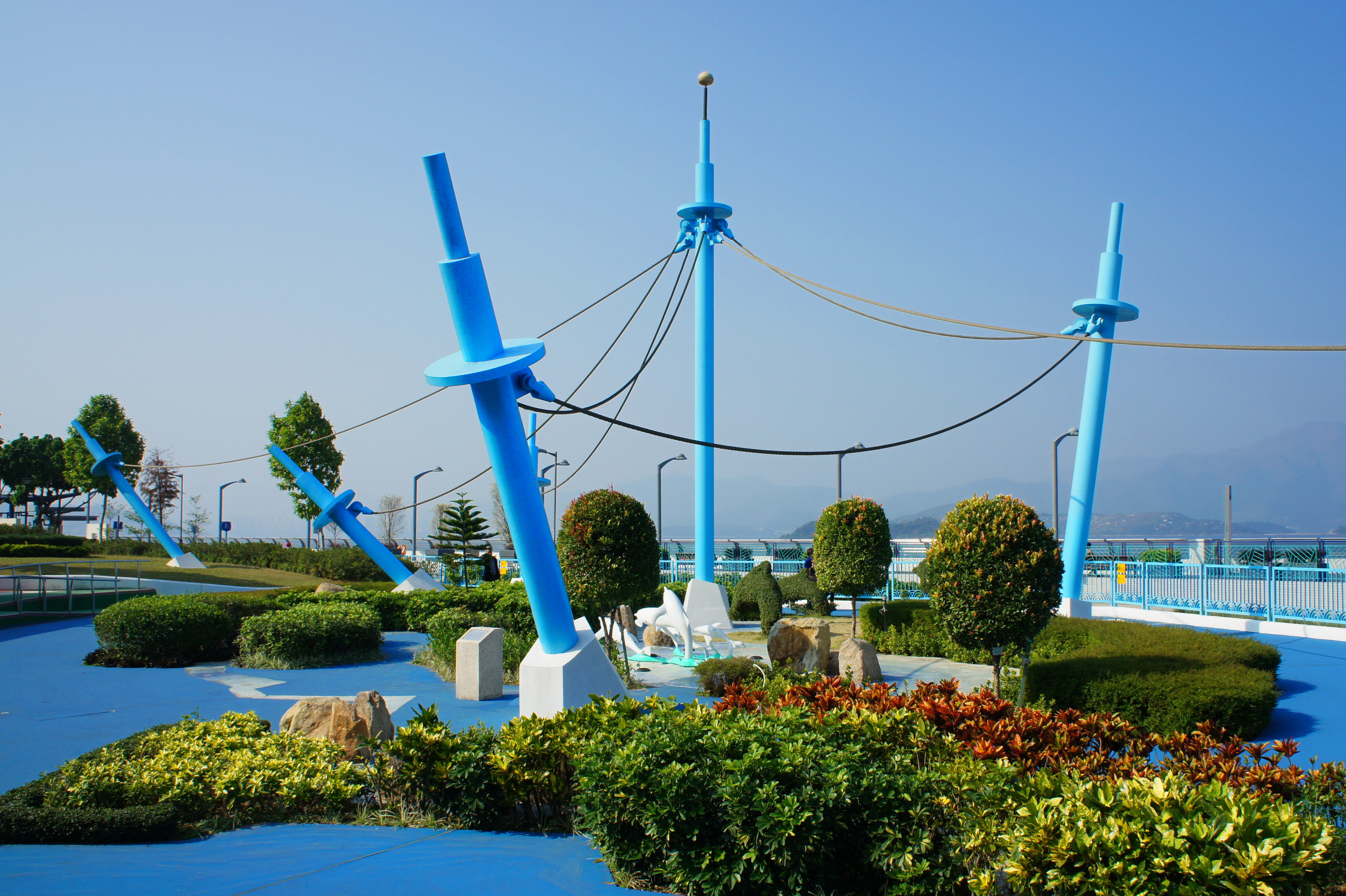
Marine Plaza

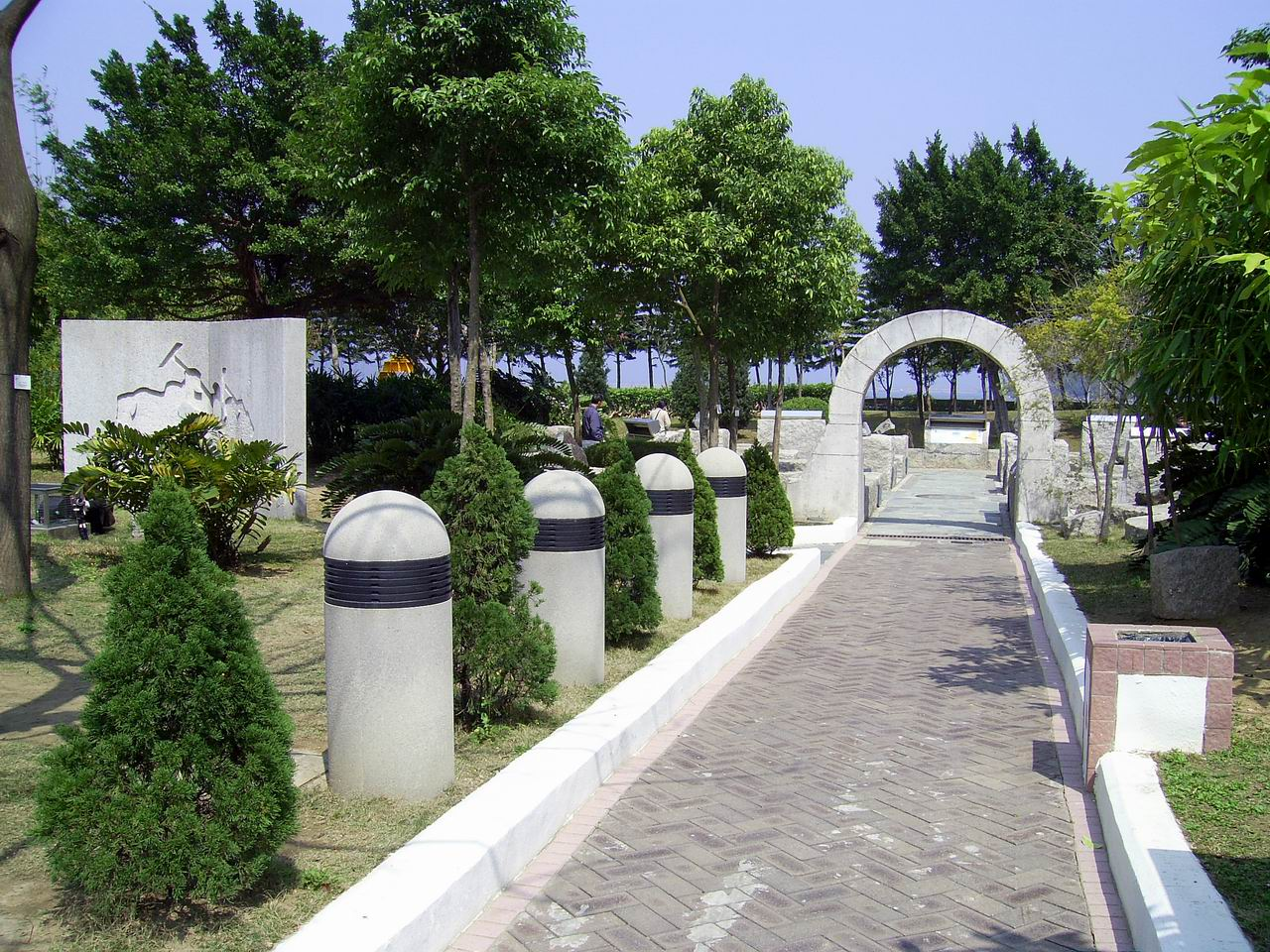
Mining History Display Area

== Facilities nearby ==
- Ma On Shan Public Library
- Ma On Shan Sports Centre
- Ma On Shan Swimming Pool
- Ma On Shan Promenade

== See also ==
- List of urban public parks and gardens in Hong Kong
- Ma On Shan Iron Mine
- Sha Tin Park
