= Kwun Tong Promenade =

Harbourfront park in Kwun Tong, Hong Kong

Coordinates: 22.3°N 114.2°E

- 觀塘海濱花園
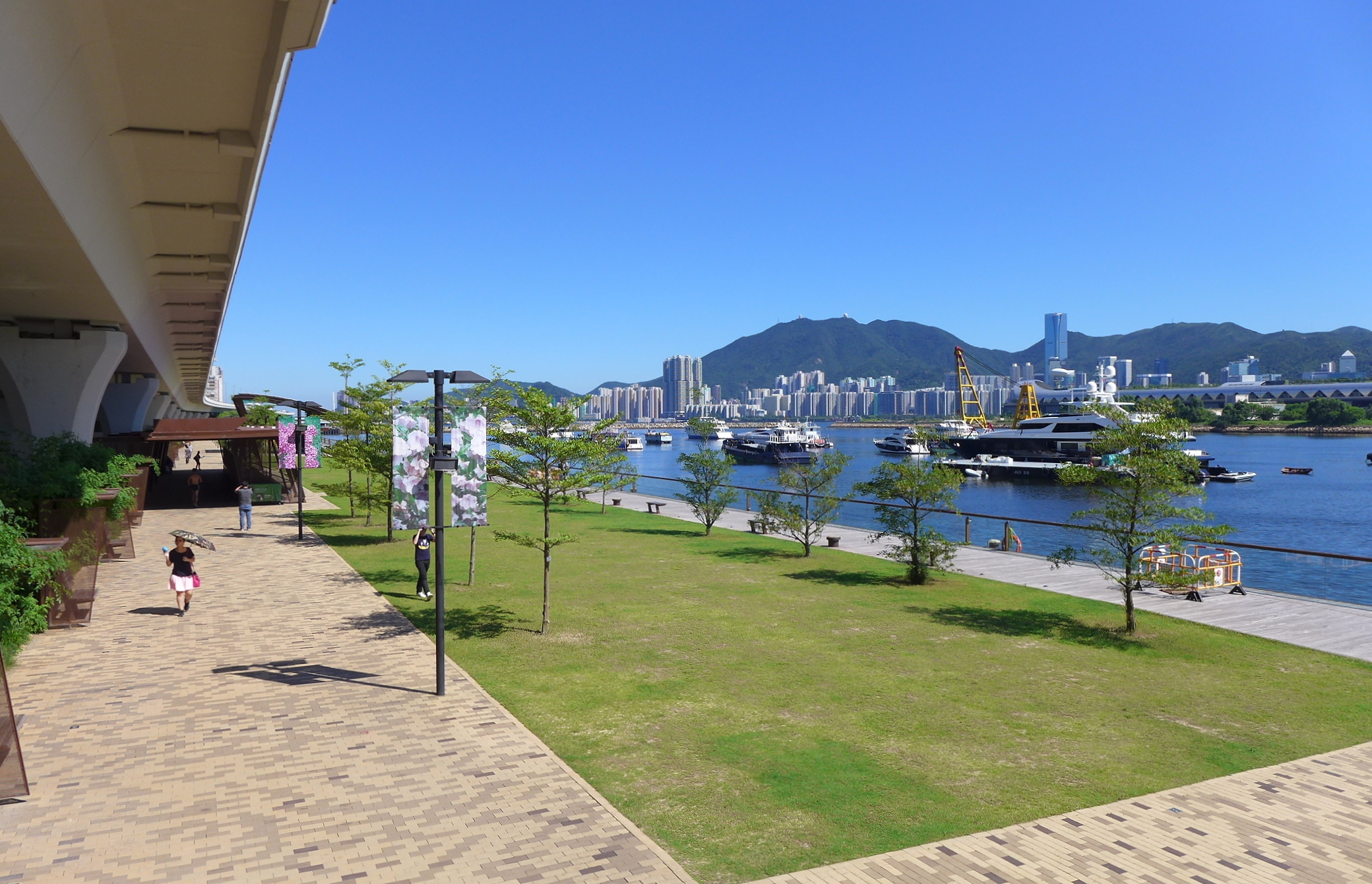
- Interactive map of Kwun Tong Promenade
- Location: Kwun Tong, Kowloon
- Area: 4.2 hectares (10 acres)
- Opened: 16 January 2010; 16 years ago (Phase I); 27 May 2015; 11 years ago (Phase II)
- Operator: Leisure and Cultural Services Department
- Open: Year round
- Public transit: Kwun Tong Ferry Pier

Kwun Tong Promenade
- Traditional Chinese: 觀塘海濱花園
- Simplified Chinese: 观塘海滨花园
Transcriptions
Standard Mandarin
- Hanyu Pinyin: Guàntáng Hǎibīn Huāyuán
Yue: Cantonese
- Jyutping: gun1 tong4 hoi2 ban1 faa1 jyun4*2

Kwun Tong Promenade is an urban waterfront park in Kwun Tong, New Kowloon, Hong Kong. The first and second stages of the promenade, opened in 2010 and 2015 respectively, comprise the first open space project of the Kai Tak Development. The promenade is about one kilometre in length. It overlooks the Kwun Tong Typhoon Shelter and sits beneath the Kwun Tong Bypass.

== History ==
The site of the promenade was formerly occupied by the Kwun Tong Public Cargo Working Area, which was home to many waste paper recycling businesses. The cargo area was reduced in size in 2009 to make way for the first phase of the promenade, a 200-metre long section near the ferry piers. This section opened to the public on 16 January 2010.

The existing Hoi Bun Road Sitting-out Area, south of the Kwun Tong Promenade, was built by the Urban Council in 1982. After the new promenade opened in 2010, this existing sitting-out area was reconstructed to adopt the same architectural style. In addition, a dry weather flow interceptor (DWFI) belonging to the Drainage Services Department was demolished and moved underground. This was completed in December 2013. The DWFI would have otherwise served as a barrier between the Kwun Tong Promenade and the Hoi Bun Road Sitting-out Area. The reconstruction of the sitting-out area was completed in 2014, effectively extending the promenade about 80 metres southward.

The waste paper recyclers in Kwun Tong protested the closure of the public cargo working area. The government responded that there was adequate space at other cargo areas in Tuen Mun, Rambler Channel, and Chai Wan and encouraged them to relocate. The public cargo working area was fully decommissioned in December 2011. The promenade was subsequently extended by 750 metres to the north, to a total length of about one kilometre. This second stage opened on 27 May 2015.

== Musical fountain ==
A musical fountain opened on 22 April 2021. It was built under the Signature Project Scheme, under which the Hong Kong government provided grants for the implementation of projects recommended by district councils. The musical fountain was proposed by the fourth term of the Kwun Tong District Council. It was endorsed by the council in 2015.

The HK$50-million cost of the fountain was widely criticised, and the project was called a "white elephant" by some residents and district councillors. A poll by the pro-Beijing political party DAB reported that 85 per cent of residents supported the project, while a 2015 poll by the Kowloon East Community Concern Group reported the opposite result, finding that 85 per cent of respondents opposed it. The government cited the DAB poll in seeking the project's approval from the Legislative Council (LegCo). Funding for the project was approved by LegCo in November 2018.

The 2019 district council elections, which took place against the backdrop of the 2019–20 pro-democracy protests, saw the pro-democracy camp take control of 17 of the 18 councils, including Kwun Tong District Council. During its first meeting, the council passed a motion calling on the government to halt the project. The government's secretary for home affairs Lau Kong-wah refused an invitation to the council and refused to send representatives of his department, and stated that the project would go ahead as planned. Pro-democracy council members suggested that if the project could not be halted, the musical fountain could play Glory to Hong Kong and be surrounded by such features as a permanent Lennon Wall and a Speakers' Corner. However, the project was implemented by the government without any such changes.

In addition to the fountain, the site includes "three interactive wet play zones equipped with sensory devices" and an "amenity lawn". Part of the fountain was closed for repairs a day after opening as "too many children came to play", thereby damaging the pavers.

== Features ==
- Amphitheatre
- Children's play area
- Fitness stations
- Landmark tower with musical mist fountain
- Lawn
- Musical fountain
- Plaza
- Toilets
- Viewing pavilion

== Gallery ==
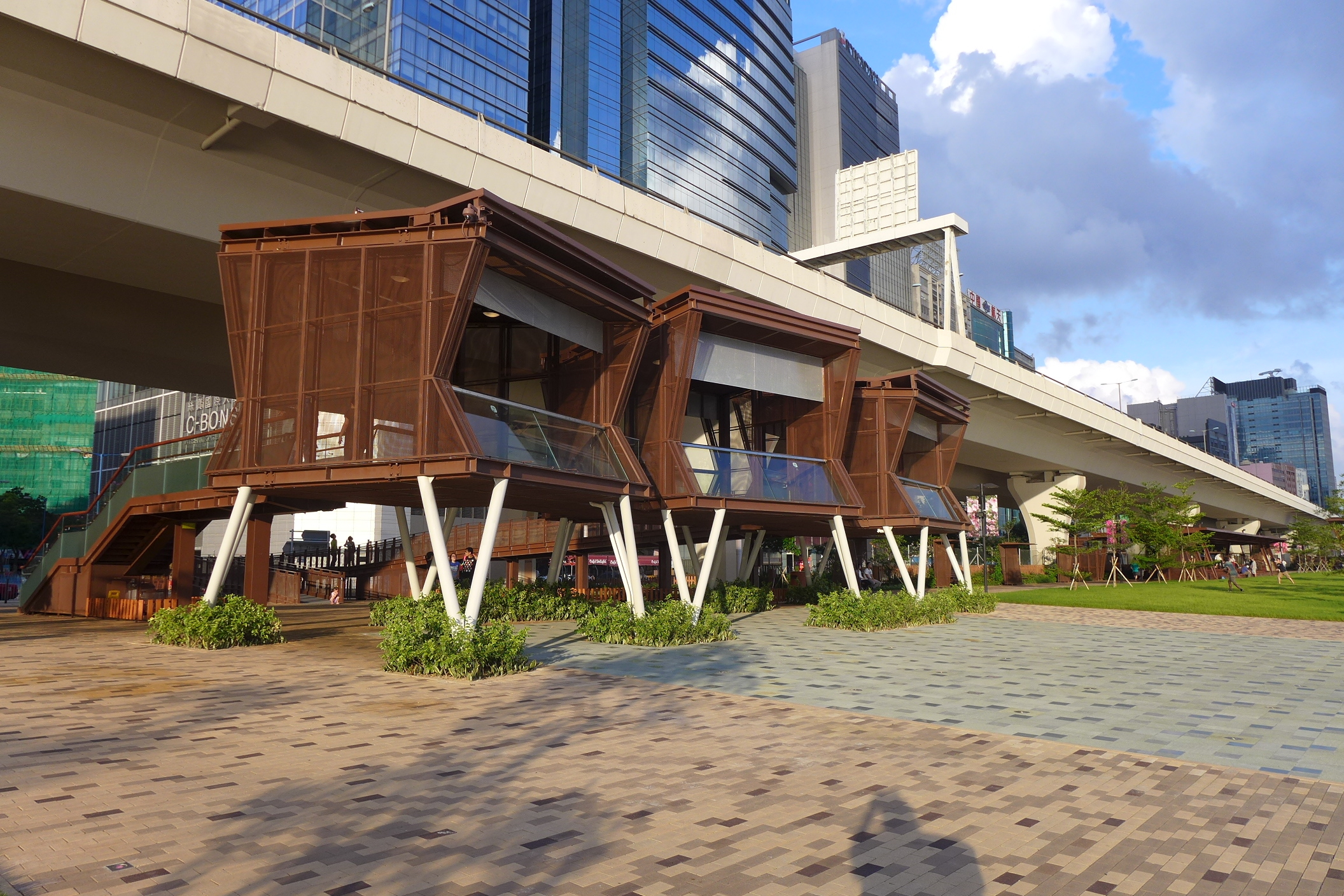
Viewing Deck

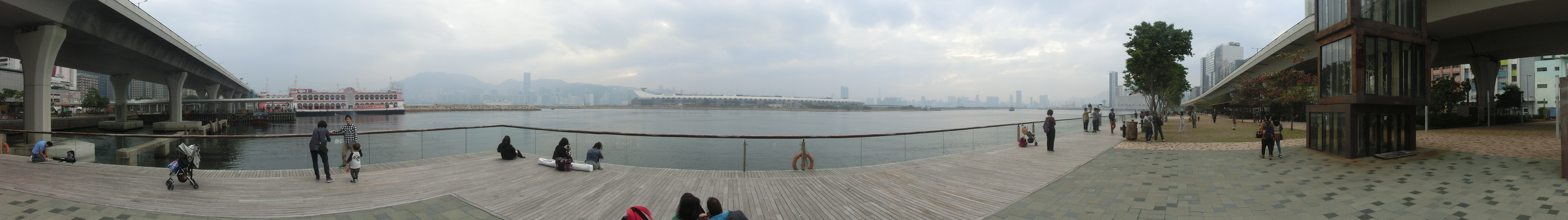
Panorama of Kwun Tong Promenade

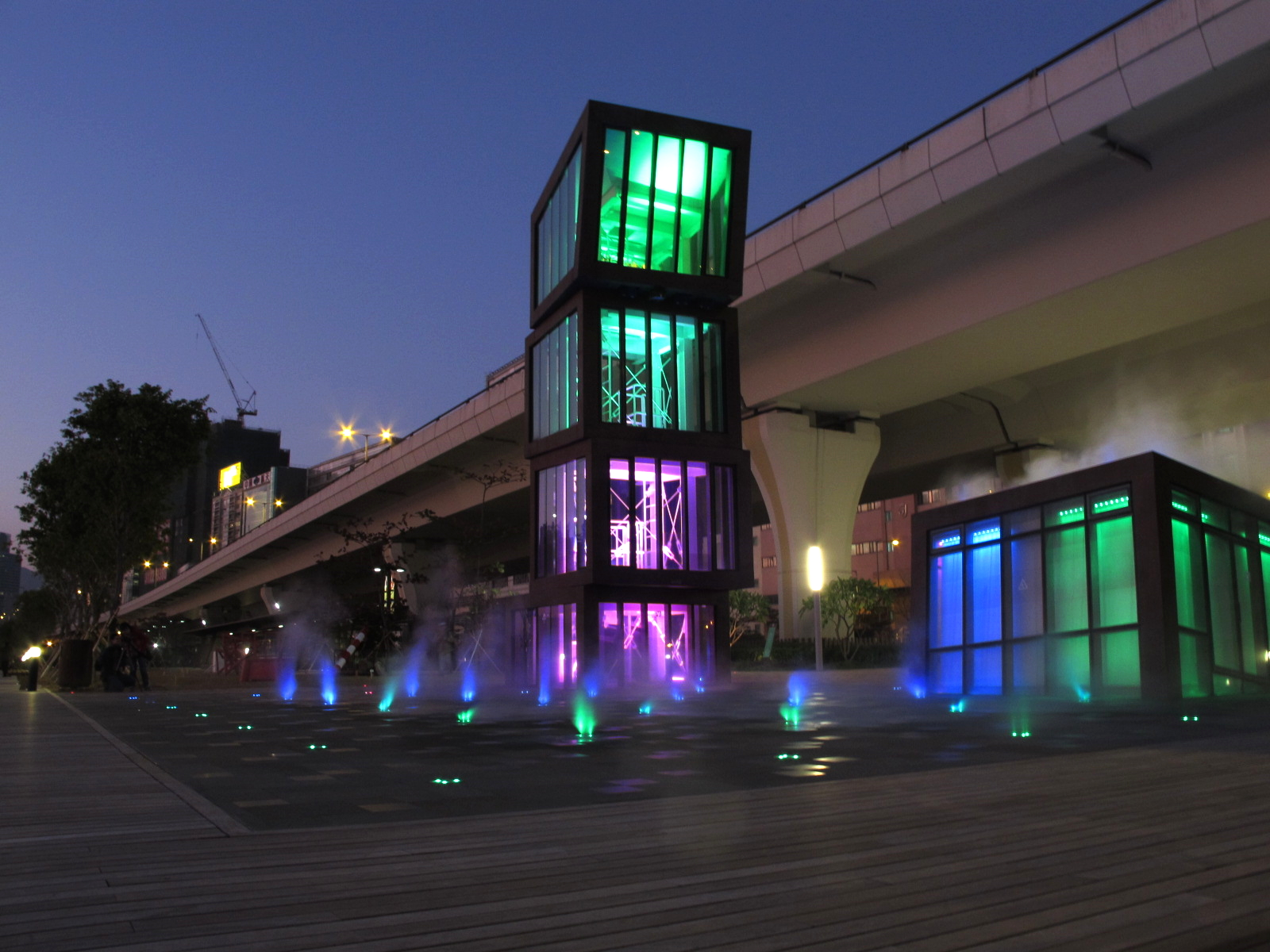
Night view of the park

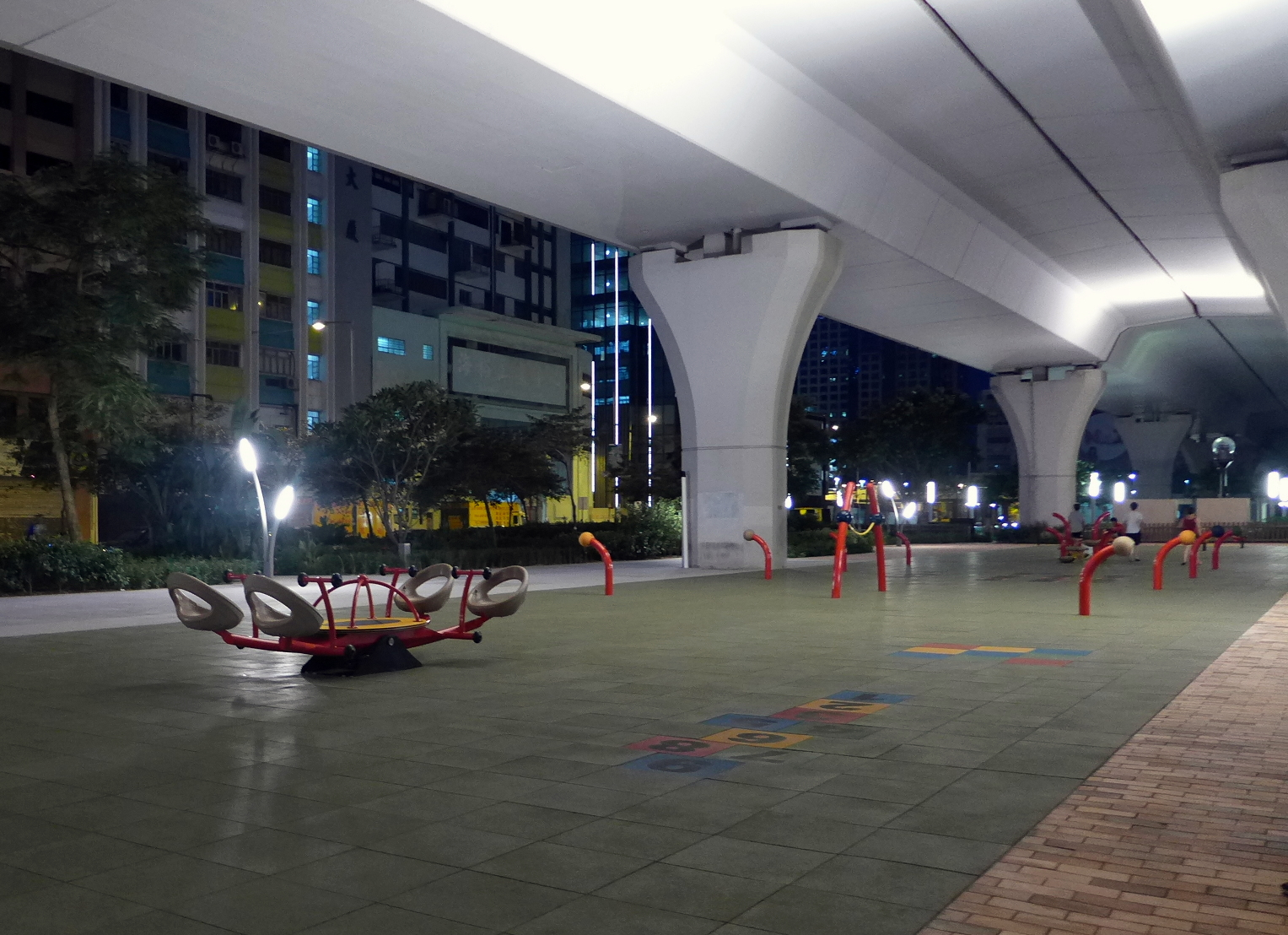
Children's play area under Kwun Tong Bypass

== See also ==
- Hoi Bun Road Park – a nearby park with a similar Chinese name
- List of urban public parks and gardens in Hong Kong
