= Lunar New Year Fair =

Annual fair tradition in China

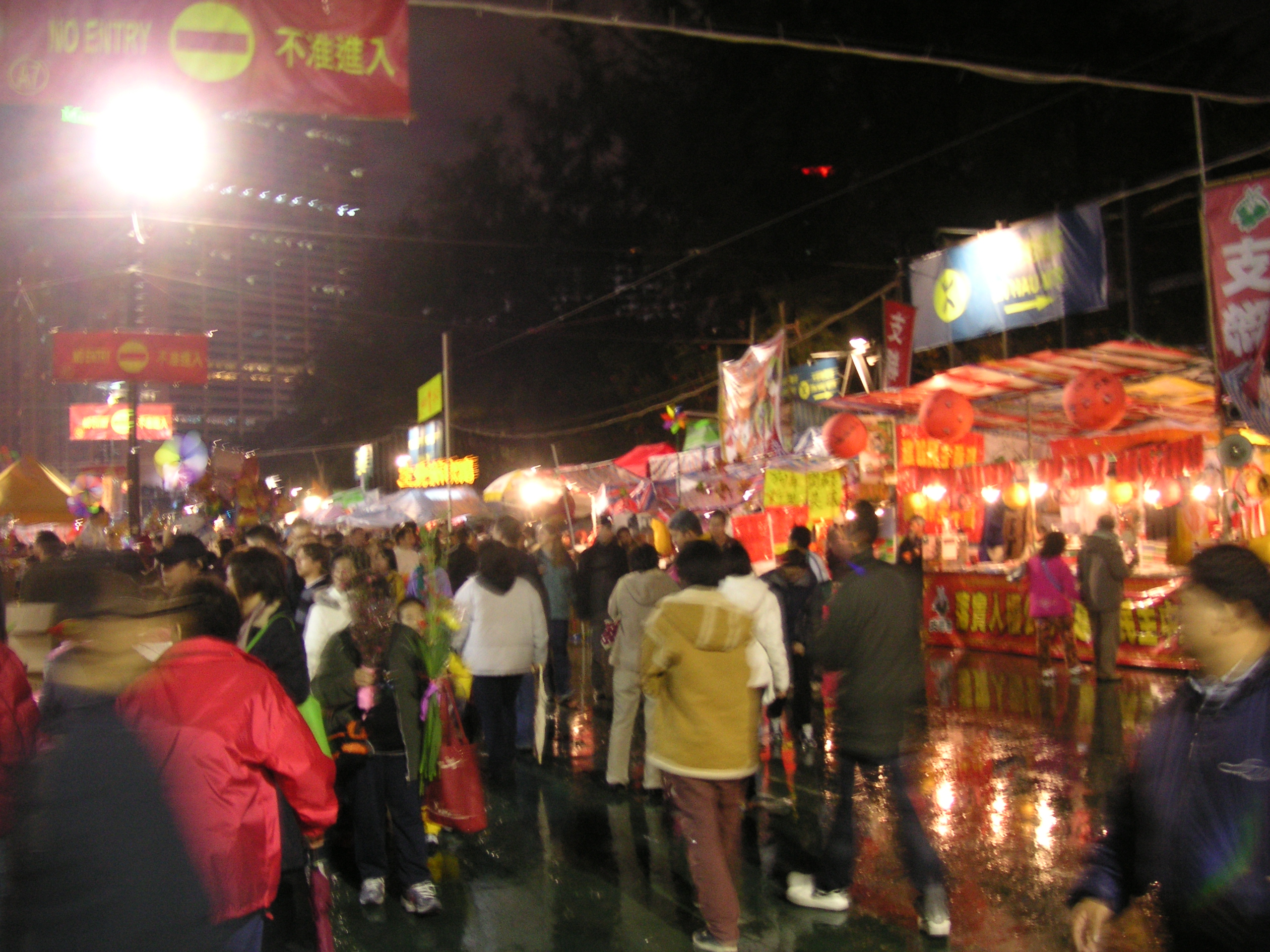
- Lunar New Year Fair at Victoria Park in Hong Kong
- Traditional Chinese: 年宵市場
- Simplified Chinese: 年宵市场
Transcriptions
Standard Mandarin
- Hanyu Pinyin: nián xiāo shìchǎng
Yue: Cantonese
- Jyutping: nin^{4} siu^{1} si^{5}coeng^{4}

Flower market
- Chinese: 花市
Transcriptions
Standard Mandarin
- Hanyu Pinyin: huāshì
Yue: Cantonese
- Jyutping: faa^{1}si^{5}

Flower street
- Chinese: 花街
Transcriptions
Standard Mandarin
- Hanyu Pinyin: huājiē
Yue: Cantonese
- Jyutping: faa^{1}gaai^{1}

The Lunar New Year Fair (Chinese: 年宵市場), also known as the flower market (Chinese: 花市), is a type of fair held annually a few days before Lunar New Year in Chinese New Year markets in China. These fairs are primarily practiced by the Cantonese, and spreads with Cantonese immigration.

== History ==
The Lunar New Year Fair's history can be traced back to the Wanli Emperor age of the Ming Dynasty. By this time, peasants sold flowers in markets south of the Pearl River. These ancient flower markets were held every day at no fixed location.

In the 1860s, the flower markets began to be held only during Lunar New Year's Eve. A particularly big fair was held in 1919. Shortly after the People's Republic of China was founded in 1949, many Cantonese people immigrated to Hong Kong from Guangzhou and other Pearl River Delta areas, taking the market tradition with them. It later spread overseas.

== Lunar New Year Fair in different cities ==
=== Hong Kong ===
In Hong Kong, fairs are held in various locations, notably Victoria Park and Fa Hui Park. These fairs gather hundreds of stalls for various goods. Half of the area sells auspicious flowering plants like narcissus, peony, chrysanthemum, peach and fruit plants like mandarin. The other half sells dry goods for Chinese New Year.

The fairs draw many visitors as part of the custom of hang nin siu (行年宵, literally: walk the year night) or hang fa shi (行花市, literally: walk the flower market). The crowd peaks at a few hours before and after midnight of New Year's Day. Stall tenders try to sell off all their stocks in these few hours before the fair closes, because surplus flowers are normally destroyed (or left to charitable organisations).

In the 2000s youths from various youth organisations, secondary schools and universities increasingly began operating stalls of their own. For example, in 2007, students from various schools set up stalls to sell many special products which are related to the pig, for example Pig Tissue Holder, Fatty Pork Chop Scarf, etc.

Traditionally, the Governor of Hong Kong visited the fair annually, usually in Victoria Park. The Chief Executive of Hong Kong continues this tradition.

==== Locations in 2006 ====
In 2006, fairs were held in:

- Victoria Park, Causeway Bay
- Fa Hui Park, Sham Shui Po
- Cheung Sha Wan Playground, Sham Shui Po
- Kai Tak East Playground, Wong Tai Sin
- Kwun Tong Recreation Ground, Kwun Tong
- Sha Tsui Road Playground, Tsuen Wan
- Kwai Chung Sports Ground, Kwai Tsing
- Shek Pai Tau Playground, Tuen Mun
- Pedestrian Mall Opposite Yuen Long Public Swimming Pool and On Hing Playground, Yuen Long
- Shek Wu Hui Playground, North District
- Tin Hau Temple Fung Shui Square, Tai Po
- Yuen Wo Playground, Sha Tin
- Man Yee Playground, Sai Kung
- Po Hong Park, Tseung Kwan O

==== Locations in 2007 ====
In 2007, fairs were held in:

- Victoria Park on Hong Kong Island
- Fa Hui Park, Cheung Sha Wan Playground, Morse Park and Kwun Tong Recreation Ground in Kowloon
- Sha Tsui Road Playground in Tsuen Wan
- Kwai Chung Sports Ground
- the open space at the Tin Hau Temple in Tuen Mun
- Tung Tau Industrial Area Playground in Yuen Long
- Shek Wu Hui Playground in North District
- Tin Hau Temple Fung Shui Square in Tai Po
- Yuen Wo Playground in Sha Tin
- Man Yee Playground in Sai Kung
- Po Hong Park in Tseung Kwan O

=== Guangzhou ===
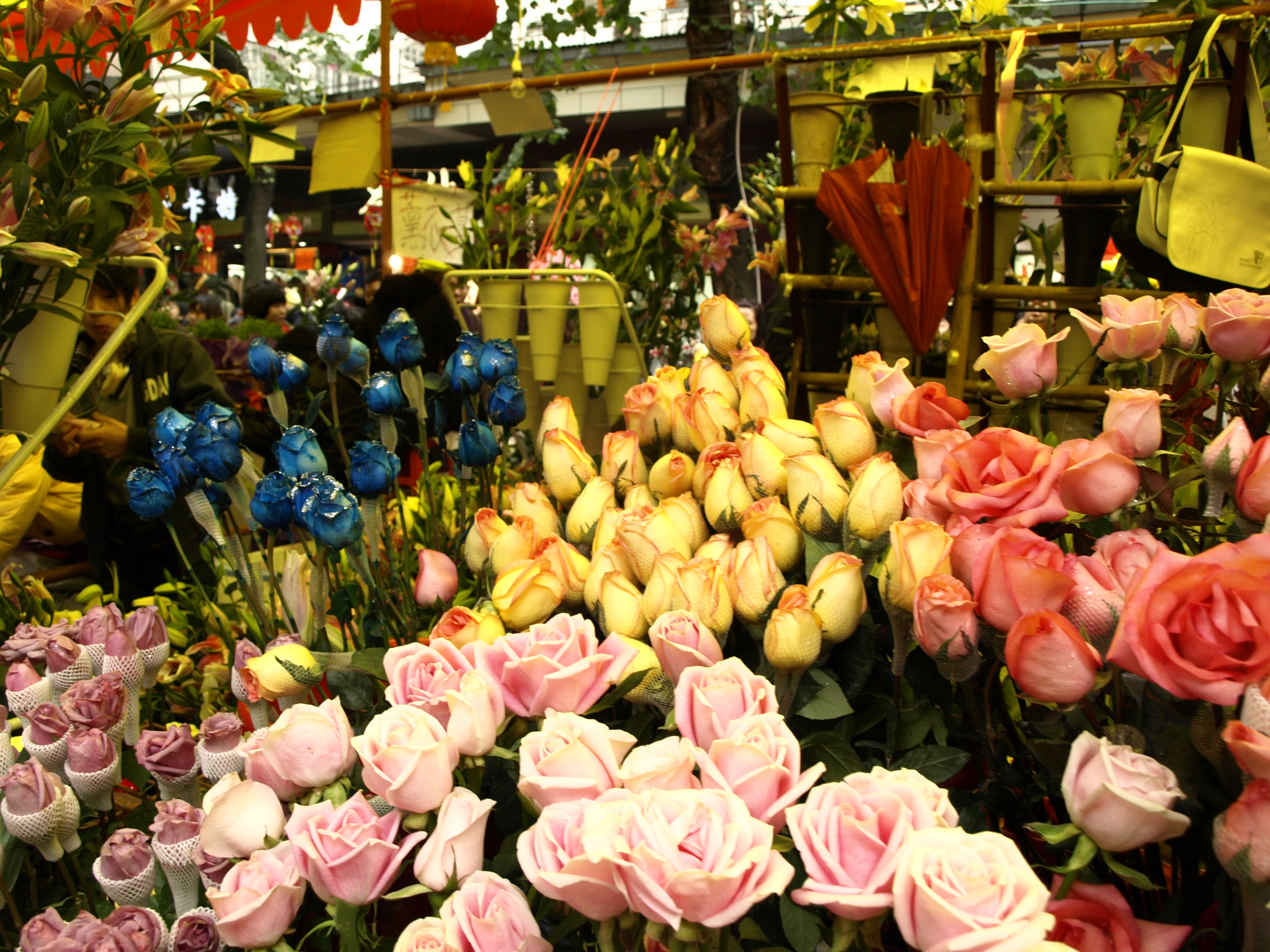
A stall in the Yue Xiu New Years Fair in Canton, 2010

Guangzhou is said to be the source of the Lunar New Year Fair. During the rule of the PRC, the Lunar New Year Fair was interrupted only once, for a few years during the Cultural Revolution. Guangzhou's fair is held 3 days before Lunar New Year's Eve. It sells New Year Trees and other goods.

In Guangzhou, there is at least one fair in each district, which became a custom since the 1960s. The origin of such fairs can be traced back to the Ming Dynasty, although official records of the Lunar New Year Fairs in Canton are found first in the 1920s, when the city was under the rule of the Republic of China.

The official name for the fair in Guangzhou is "flower market" (花市); however, the locals tend to use the term flower street (花街), referring to the fact that the fairs in Guangzhou are held on streets that are available for vehicles on normal days but turned into pedestrian zones during the days of the fair.

== See also ==
- Marketplace
- Mong Kok Flower Market
