= Fa Hui Park =

Park in Mong Kok, Hong Kong

- 花墟公園
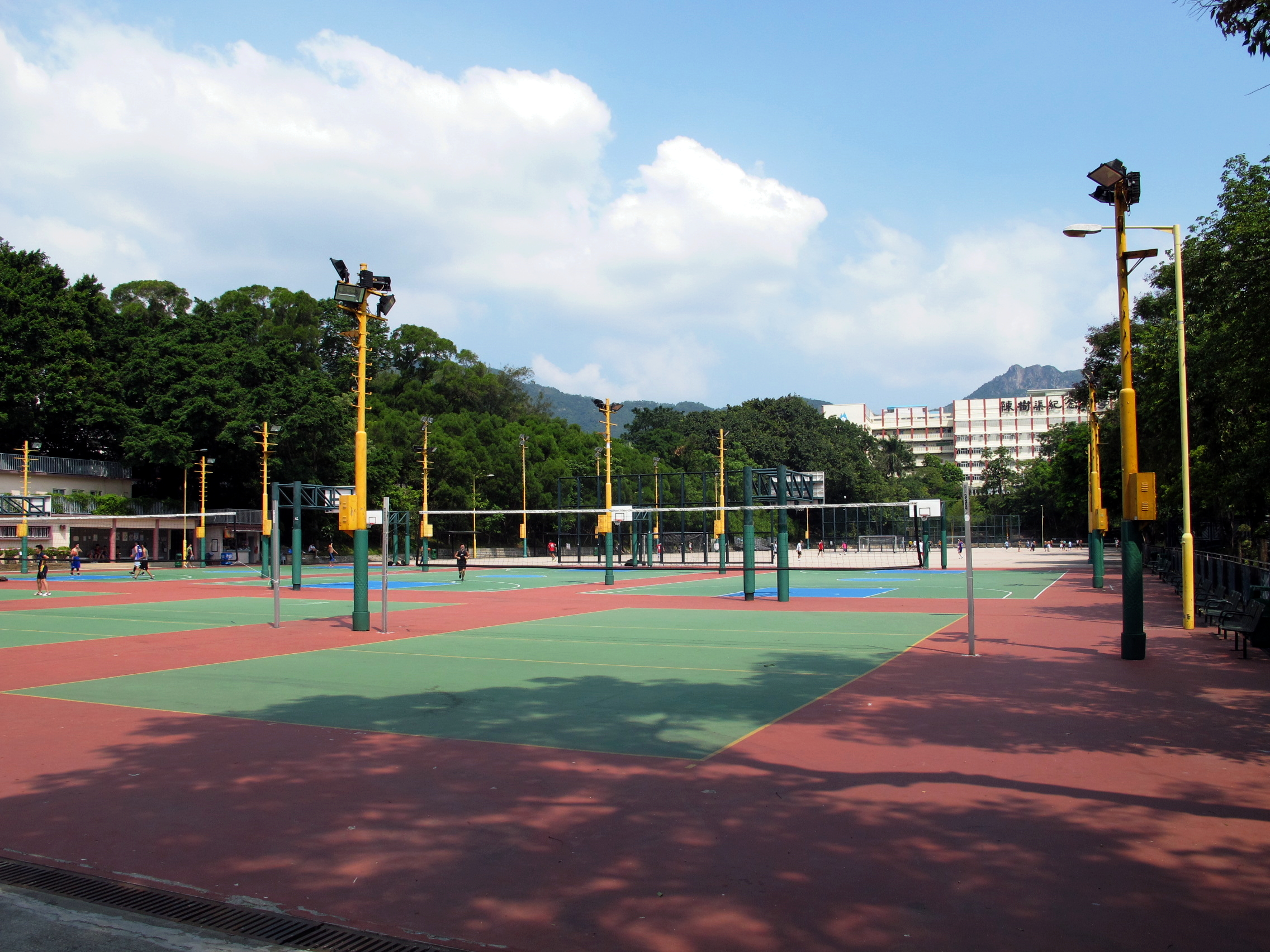
- Fa Hui Park Basketball Court

- Location within Hong Kong
- Type: Urban park
- Location: Sham Shui Po, Kowloon
- Coordinates: 22°19′41″N 114°10′26″E
- Area: 3.19 hectares (7.9 acres)
- Manager: Leisure and Cultural Services Department
- Open: All year from 7 a.m. to 11 p.m.

Fa Hui Park (Chinese: 花墟公園; Jyutping: faa1 heoi1 gung1 jyun4) is a park located north of Boundary Street, in Mong Kok, Kowloon, Hong Kong. It occupies 3.19 hectares (7.9 acres). It is one of the sites where a Lunar New Year Fair is held every year.

There is a 1,100 square metres (12,000 sq ft) community garden in the park. Participants of "Community Garden Programme" are allowed to grow crops and ornamental plants in the community garden of Fa Hui Park; they are also permitted to take the harvest home afterwards.

== History ==
Before Fa Hui Park was built, 8,000 squatters lived there. On 1 November 1955, a disastrous fire devastated over 400 huts, killed four persons and left over 6,000 people homeless. On 22 October 1956, another fire made a further 2,000 people homeless. After accommodating the victims at various resettlement estates in Kowloon, the Government built Fa Hui Park there.

== See also ==
- List of urban public parks and gardens in Hong Kong
