= Yuen Long Park =

Public park in Yuen Long, Hong Kong

Coordinates: 22°26′30″N 114°01′07″E

- 元朗公園
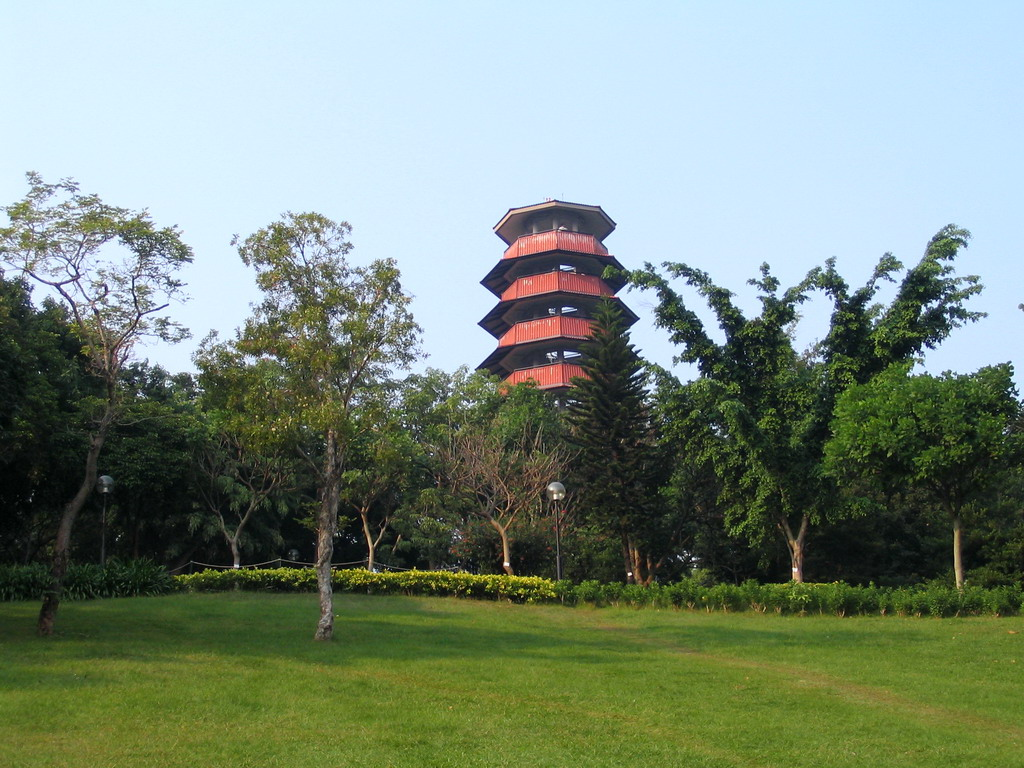
- Yuen Long Park Aviary Pagoda
- Interactive map of Yuen Long Park
- Location: Yuen Long, New Territories, Hong Kong
- Area: 7.5 hectares (19 acres)
- Established: 26 October 1991; 34 years ago
- Opening: Cheung Yan-lung
- Owner: Hong Kong Government
- Operator: Leisure and Cultural Services Department

Yuen Long Park
- Traditional Chinese: 元朗公園
Transcriptions
Yue: Cantonese
- Yale Romanization: Yùhn lóhng gūng yún
- Jyutping: Jyun4 long5 gung1 jyun2

Yuen Long Town Park
- Traditional Chinese: 元朗市鎮公園
Transcriptions
Yue: Cantonese
- Yale Romanization: Yùhn lóhng síh jan gūng yún
- Jyutping: Jyun4 long5 si5 zan3 gung1 jyun2

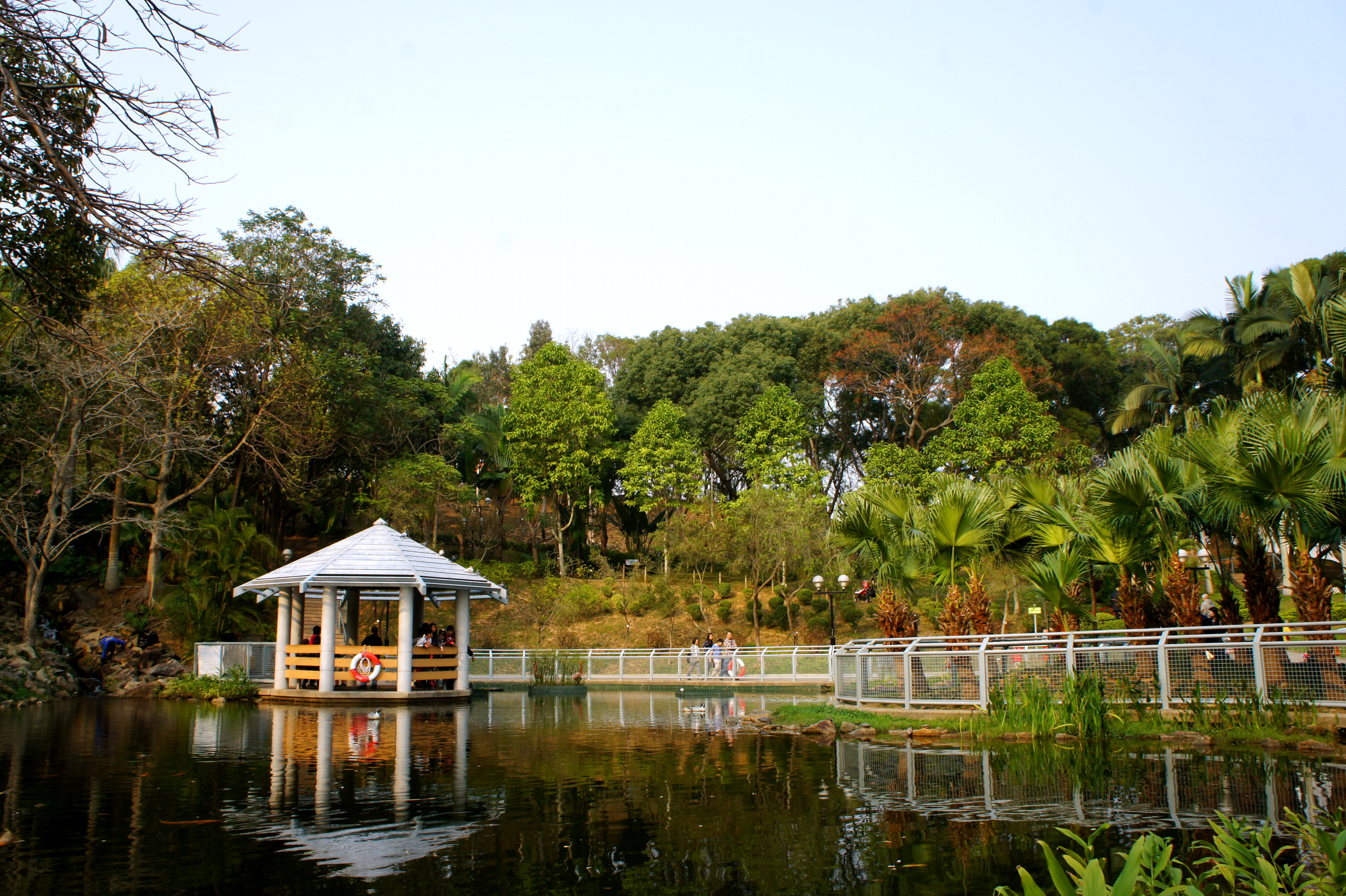
Yuen Long Park Ornamental Lake

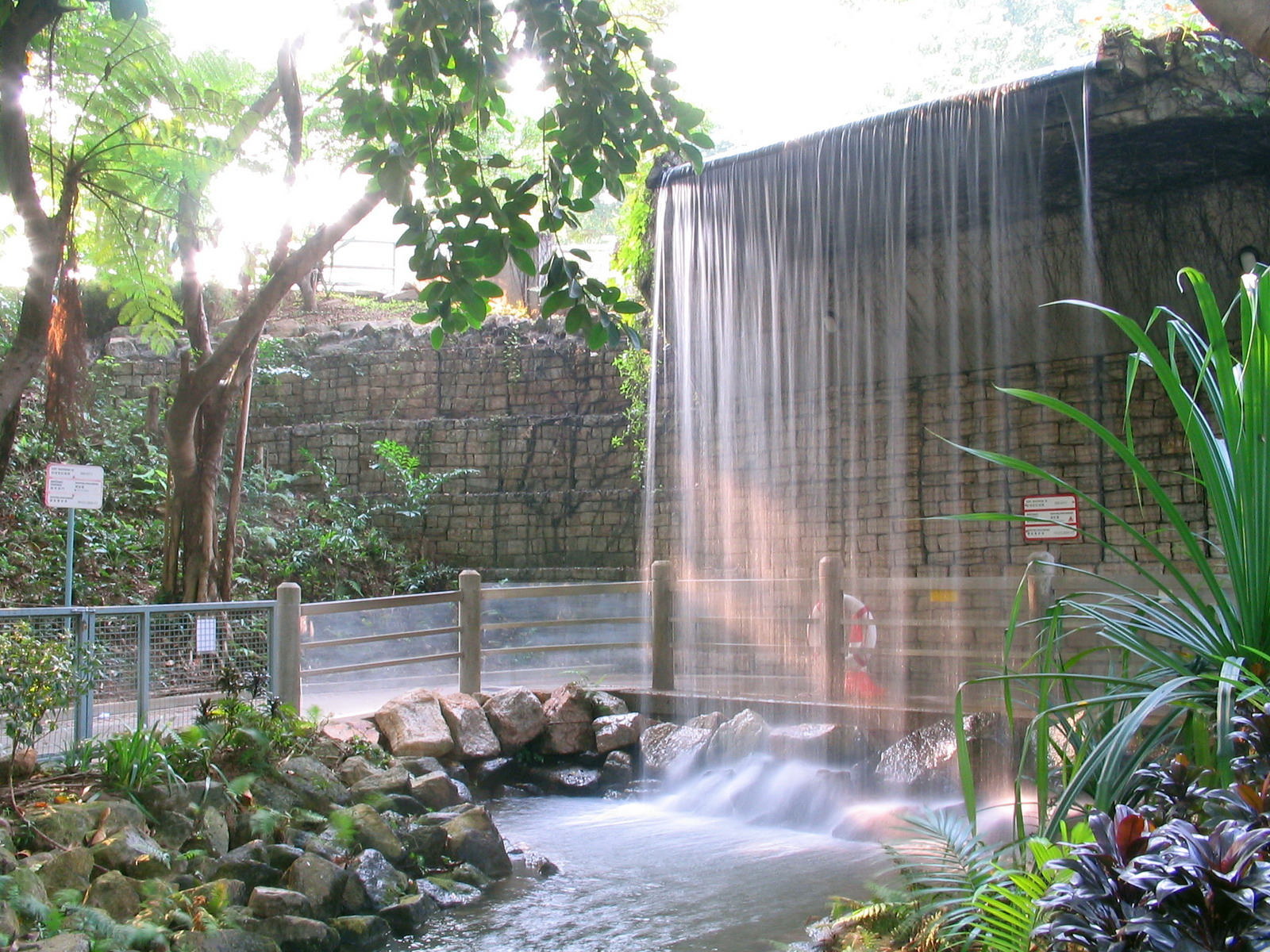
Yuen Long Park Waterfall

Yuen Long Park, formerly called Yuen Long Town Park, is located in Yuen Long, New Territories, Hong Kong. It is managed by Leisure and Cultural Services Department.

== History ==
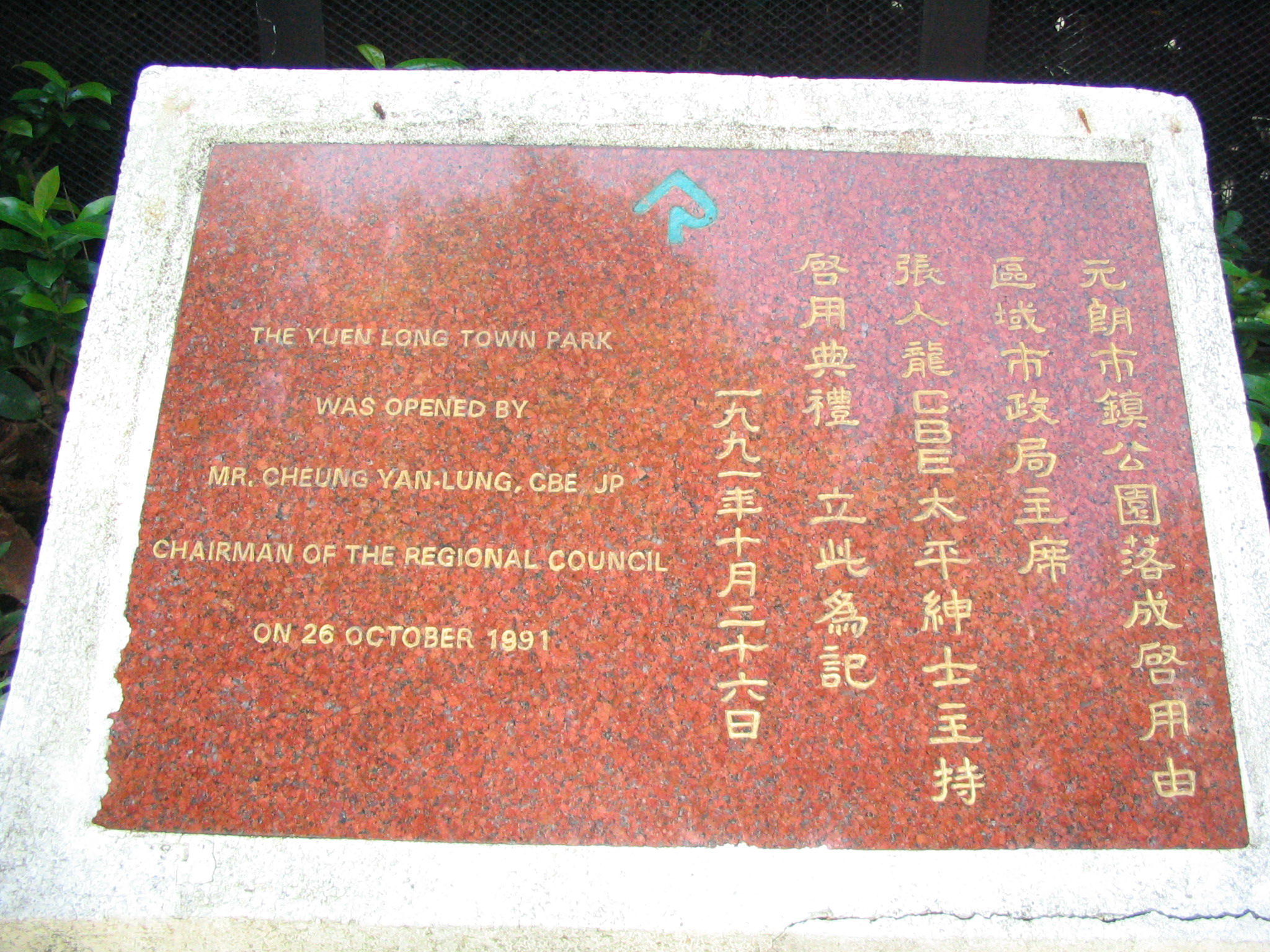
Yuen Long Park commemorative plaque.

The park was a natural woodland at Shui Ngau Ling, Yuen Long. The existing geographical pattern and trees was preserved as much as possible. The park was officially opened by Cheung Yan-lung, chairman of the Regional Council to the public on 26 October 1991.

The park was formerly called Yuen Long Town Park. It occupies 7.5 hectares.

== Features ==
The park has a seven-level pagoda with an aviary at its base. It also has football pitches, a gateball court, children's playgrounds, fitness stations, and public toilets. The gateball pitch was the first within the service area of the Regional Council.

The park is also home to an automatic weather station, operated by the Hong Kong Observatory, which was commissioned on 20 March 2015. Temperature readings from the station are published round-the-clock on the observatory's website.

== Nearby buildings ==
- Yuen Long Public Swimming Pool
- Yuen Long Police Station
- YLDSA Sports Grounds
- Yuen Long Town Hall
- Yuen Long Stadium
- Park Royale

== Gallery ==
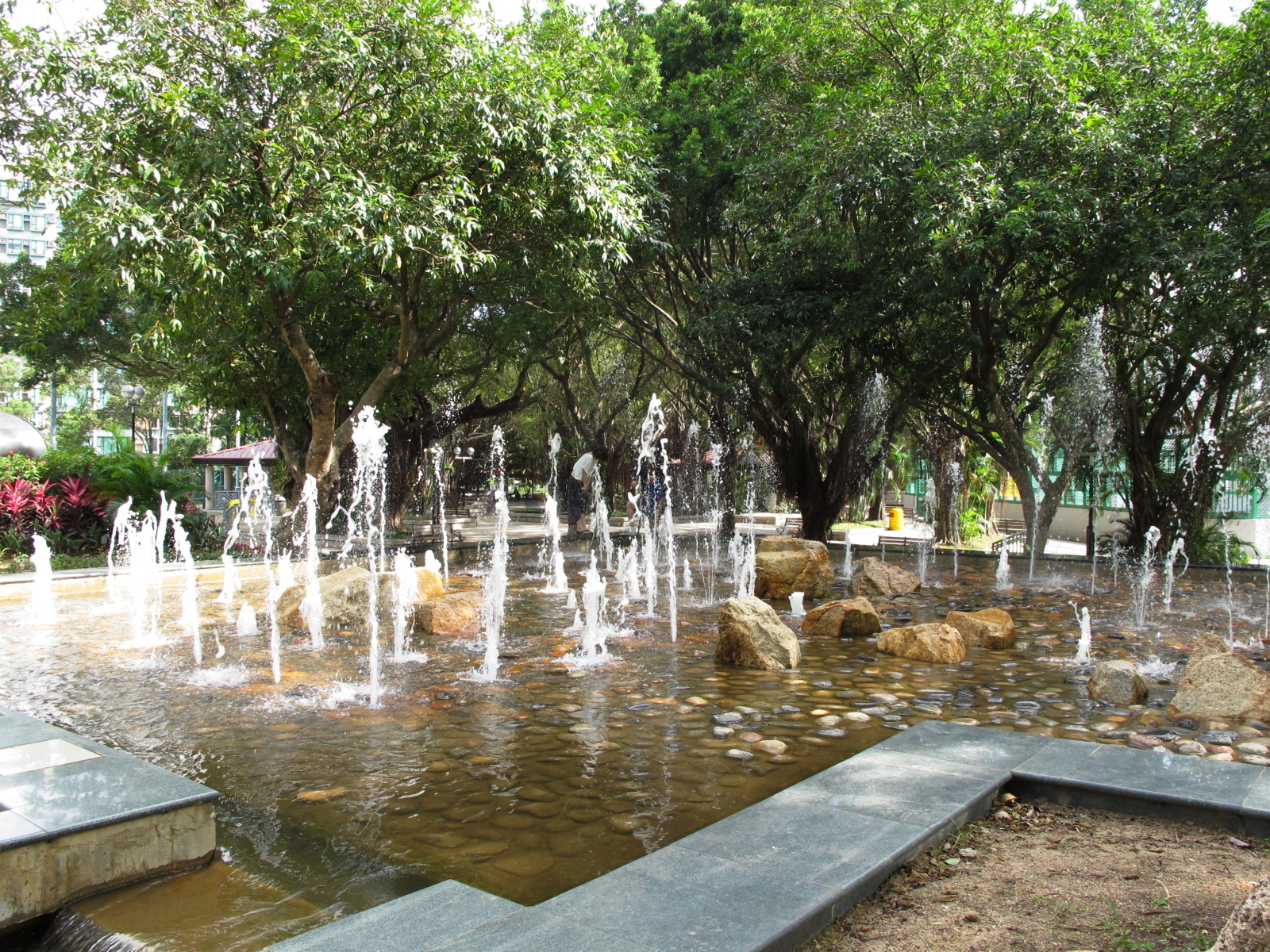
Fountain Plaza

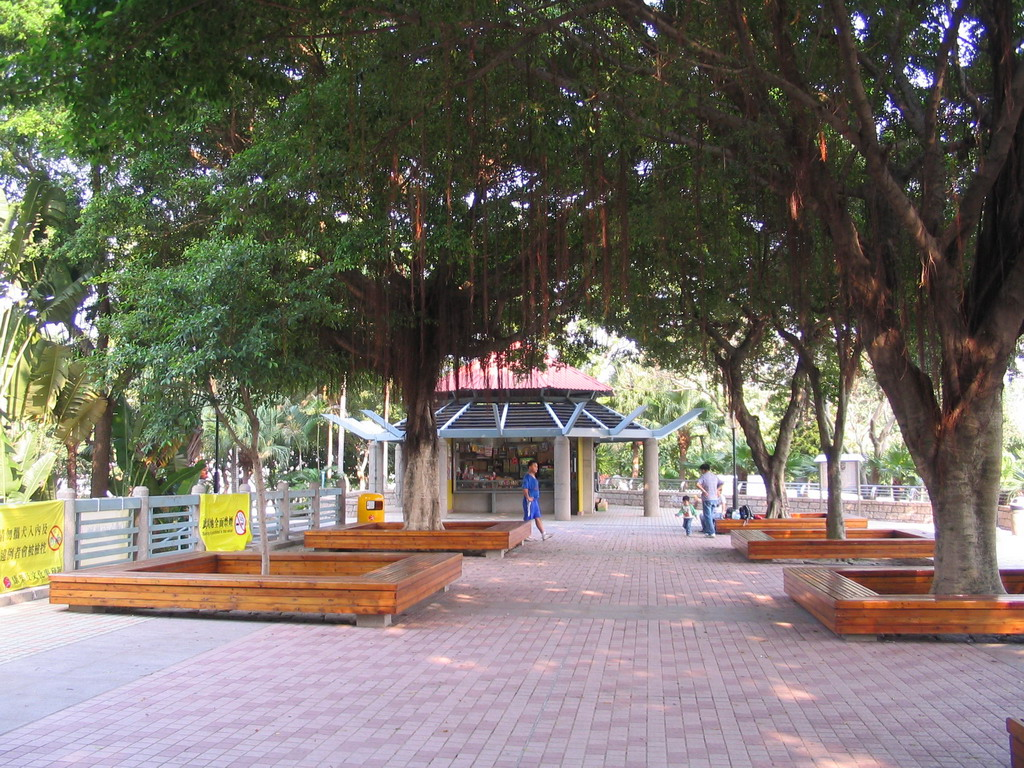
Hill Top Plaza

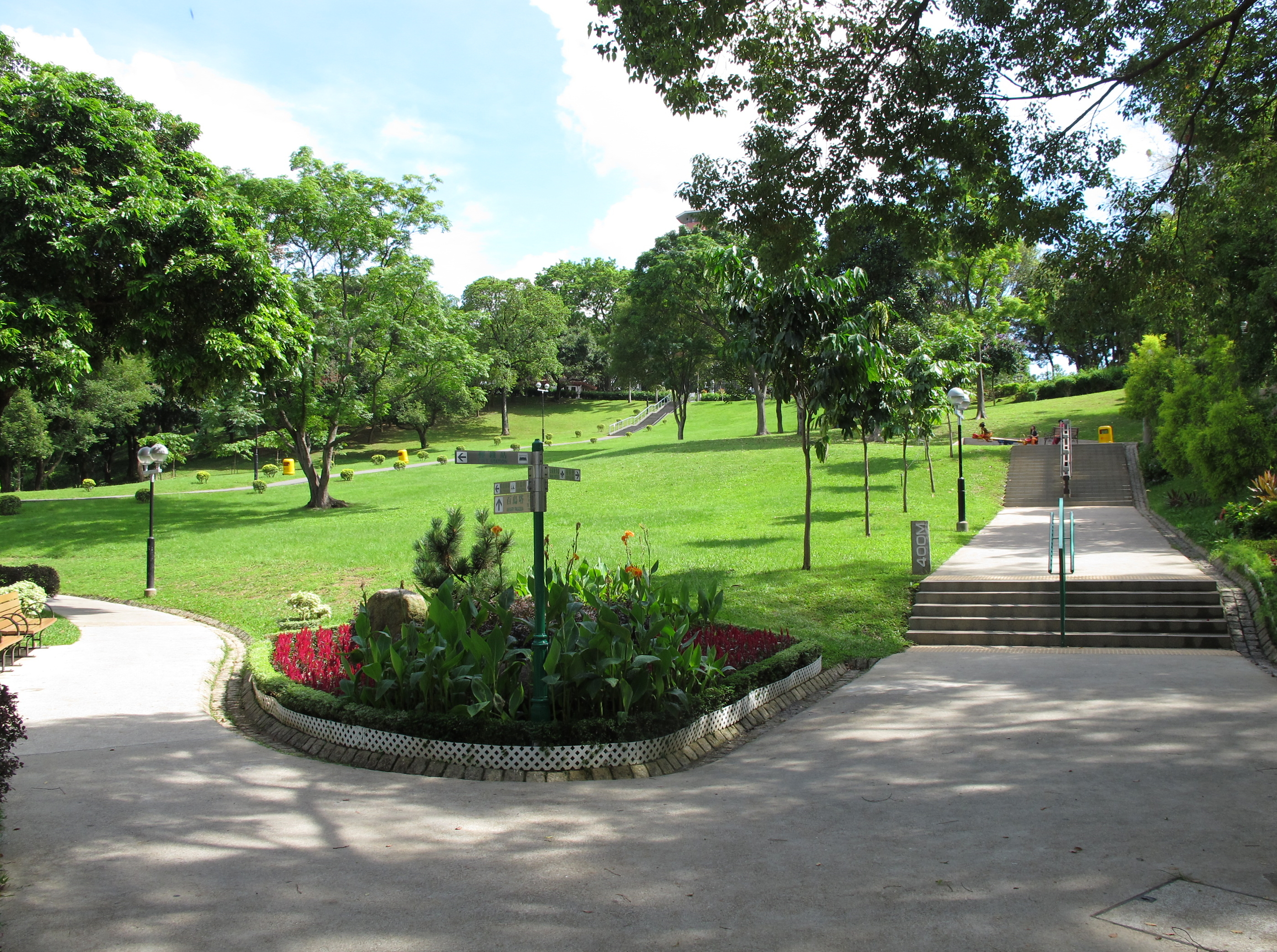
Lawn Area

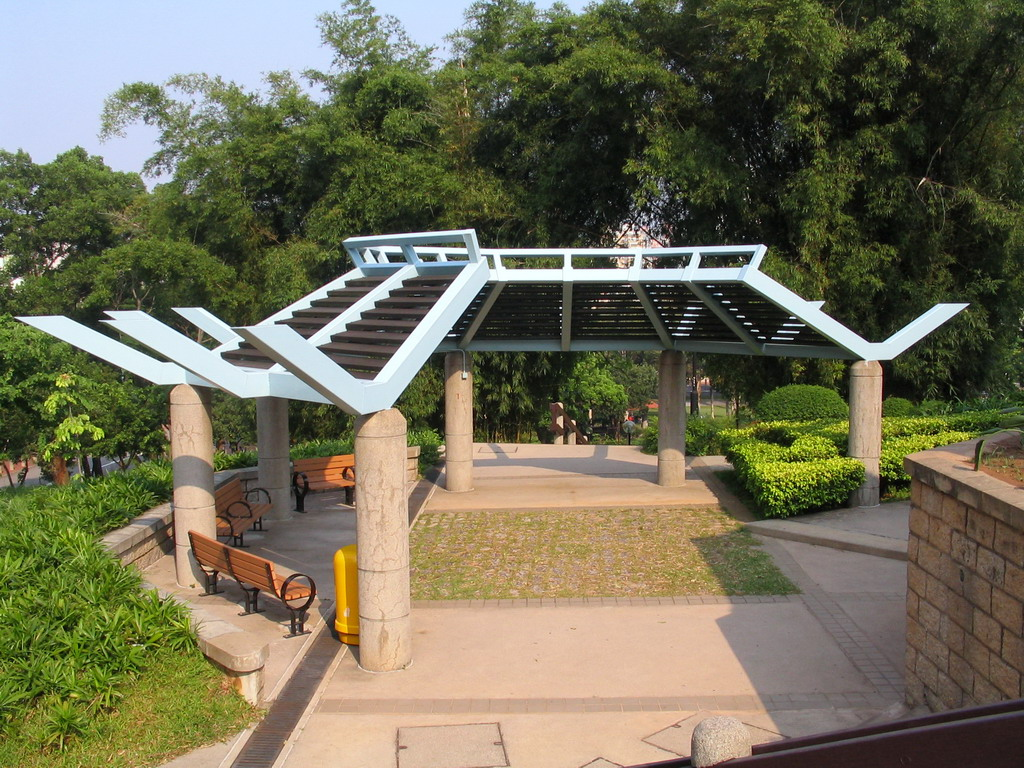
Pavilion

== See also ==
- Leisure and Cultural Services Department
- List of urban public parks and gardens in Hong Kong
