= List of urban public parks and gardens in Hong Kong =

Urban public parks and gardens in Hong Kong include:

Note: Most public parks and gardens in Hong Kong are managed by the Leisure and Cultural Services Department (LCSD).

== Hong Kong Island ==
- Aberdeen Promenade (Aberdeen)
- Aldrich Bay Park (Aldrich Bay, Sai Wan Ho)
- Blake Garden (Sheung Wan)
- Chai Wan Park (Chai Wan)
- Chater Garden (Central)
- Cheung Kong Park (Central) (managed by Cheung Kong, open to public)
- Choi Sai Woo Park (Braemar Hill, North Point)
- Connaught Place (Central)
- Harcourt Garden (Admiralty)
- Hollywood Road Park (Sheung Wan)
- Hong Kong Park (Admiralty)
- Hong Kong Zoological and Botanical Gardens (Mid-Levels)
- King George V Memorial Park, Hong Kong (Sai Ying Pun)
- Pak Tsz Lane Park (Central)
- Quarry Bay Park (Quarry Bay)
- Southorn Playground (Wan Chai)
- Statue Square (Central)
- Sun Yat Sen Memorial Park (Sheung Wan)
- Tamar Park (Tamar)
- Wong Nai Chung Reservoir Park (Mid-levels)
- Victoria Park (Causeway Bay)
- Victoria Peak Garden (Victoria Peak)

== Kowloon and New Kowloon ==
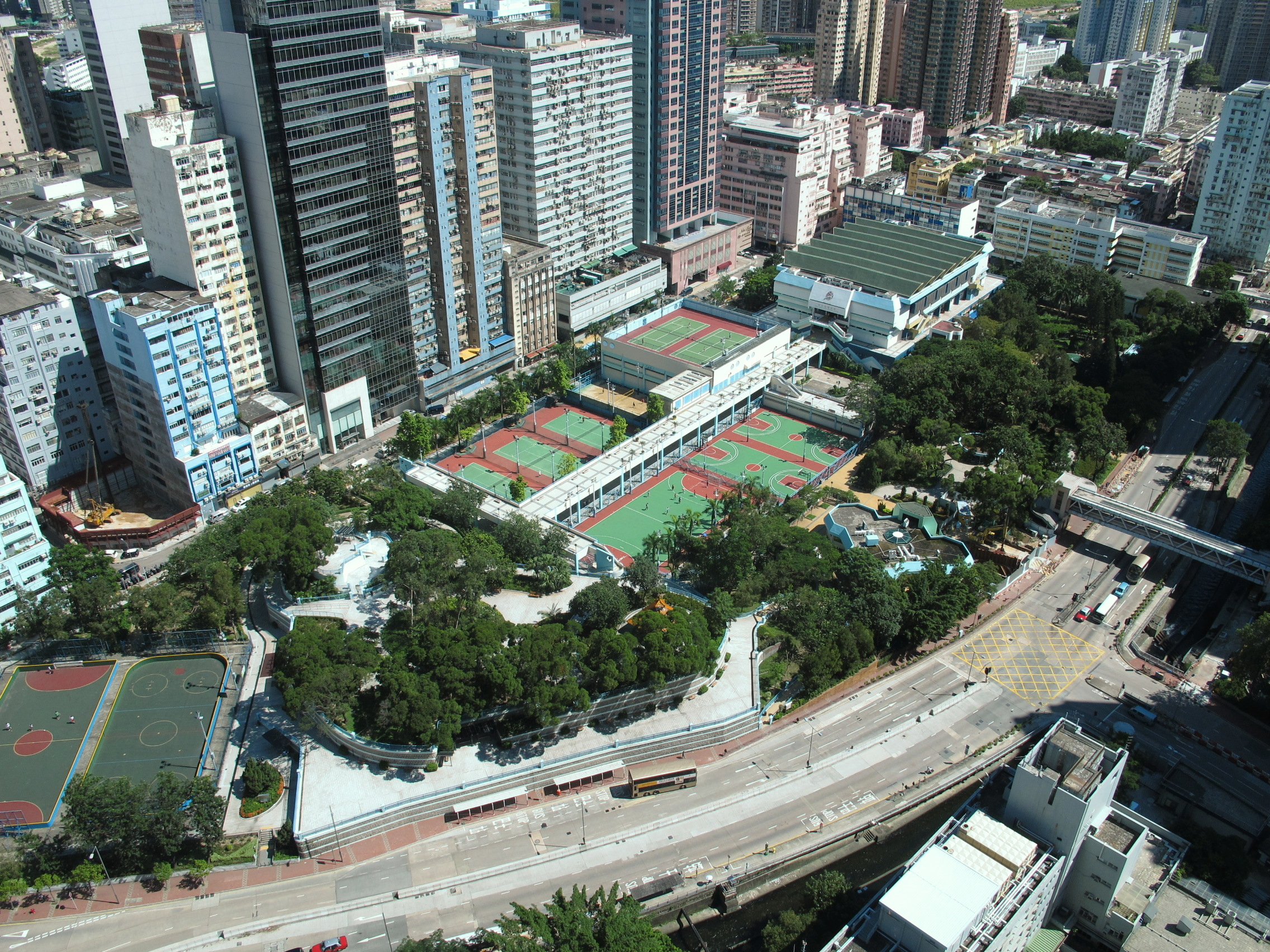
Choi Hung Road Playground

- Choi Hung Road Playground
- Fa Hui Park
- Hoi Bun Road Park (Kwun Tong)
- Hoi Sham Park (To Kwa Wan)
- Hong Ning Road Park (Kwun Tong)
- Hutchison Park (Hung Hom)
- Jordan Valley Park
- King George V Memorial Park, Kowloon
- King's Park
- Ko Shan Road Park, To Kwa Wan
- Kowloon Bay Park
- Kowloon Park (Tsim Sha Tsui)
- Kowloon Tsai Park
- Kowloon Walled City Park (Kowloon City)
- Kwun Tong Promenade
- Lai Chi Kok Park (Mei Foo)
- Nan Lian Garden (Diamond Hill)
- Morse Park
- Nam Cheong Park
- Ngau Chi Wan Park
- Po Kong Village Road Park
- Sau Mau Ping Memorial Park
- Sham Shui Po Park (Sham Shui Po)
- Shek Kip Mei Park (Sham Shui Po)
- Sung Wong Toi Park (Kowloon City)
- Tung Chau Street Park (Sham Shui Po)
- Urban Council Centenary Garden (Tsim Sha Tsui East)
- Yuen Po Street Bird Garden
- West Kowloon Waterfront Promenade

== New Territories (excluding New Kowloon) ==
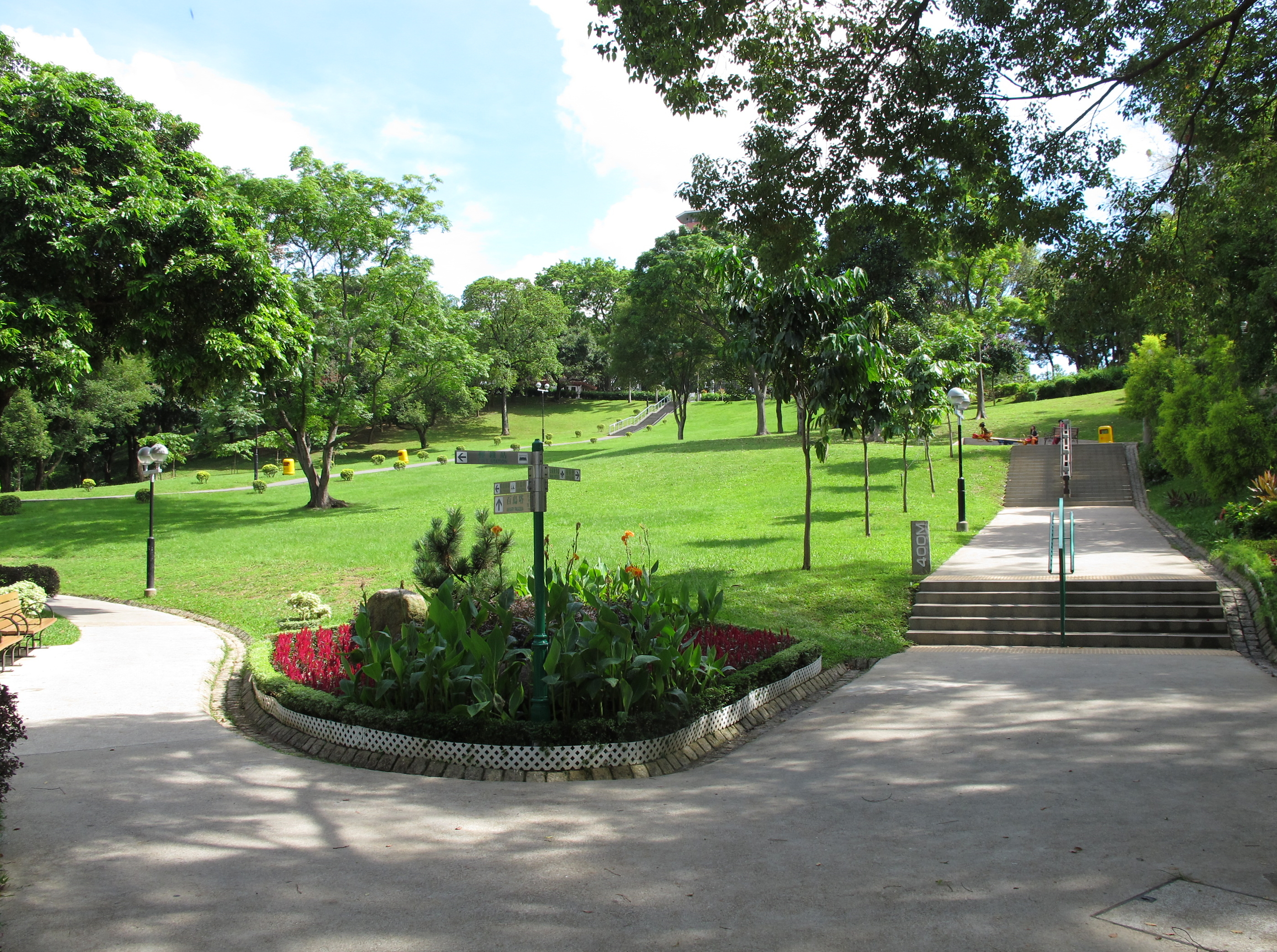
Yuen Long Park

- Central Kwai Chung Park
- Hong Kong Velodrome Park (Tseung Kwan O)
- Ma On Shan Park
- Ma On Shan Promenade
- North District Park
- Penfold Park (in the middle of Sha Tin Racecourse)
- Po Hong Park
- Po Tsui Park
- Sha Tin Park (in Sha Tin New Town)
- Shing Mun Valley Park
- Tai Po Waterfront Park
- Tin Shui Wai Park
- Tsing Yi Northeast Park
- Tsing Yi Park
- Tsing Yi Promenade
- Tsuen Wan Park
- Tsuen Wan Riviera Park
- Tuen Mun Park
- Tung Chung North Park
- Yuen Chau Kok Park
- Yuen Long Park

== See also ==
- List of buildings and structures in Hong Kong
- Country parks and conservation in Hong Kong
