= Tin Shui Wai Park =

Public park in New Territories, Hong Kong

Coordinates: 22.45626°N 114.00193°E

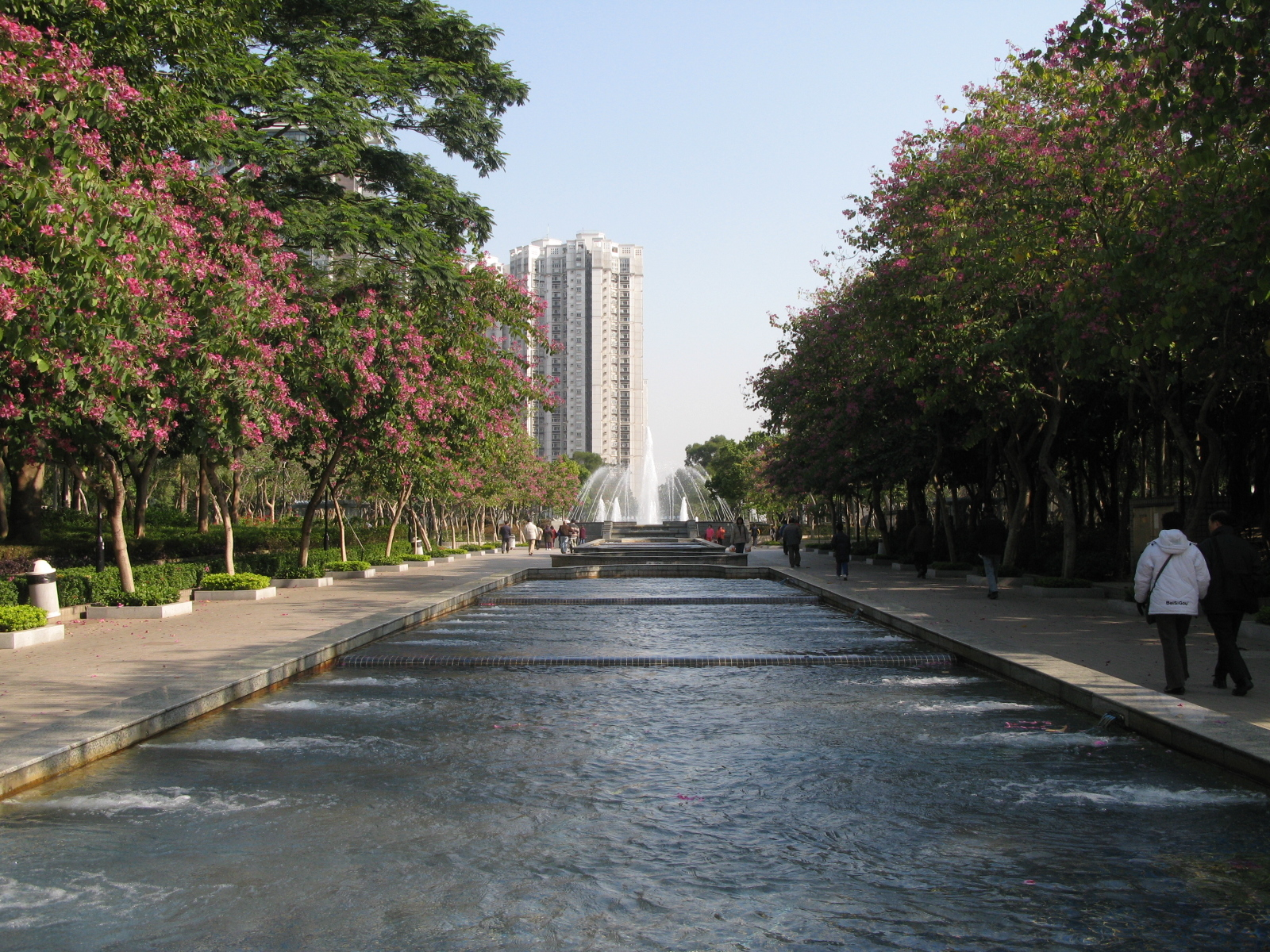
- Central fountain

- Location within Hong Kong
- Type: Town park
- Location: 6 Tin Shui Road, Tin Shui Wai, New Territories
- Area: 14.86 hectares (36.7 acres)
- Opened: 26 March 1993; 33 years ago
- Operator: Leisure and Cultural Services Department

Tin Shui Wai Park (Chinese: 天水圍公園) is the central park of Tin Shui Wai New Town, New Territories, Hong Kong.

It is located alongside the Tin Shui Wai Sports Ground.

== History ==
As with the rest of Tin Shui Wai, the park was built on land reclaimed from low-lying fish ponds.

== See also ==
- List of urban public parks and gardens in Hong Kong
