= North District Park =

Public park in Sheung Shui, Hong Kong

Coordinates: 22°29′55.52″N 114°8′1.23″E

- 北區公園
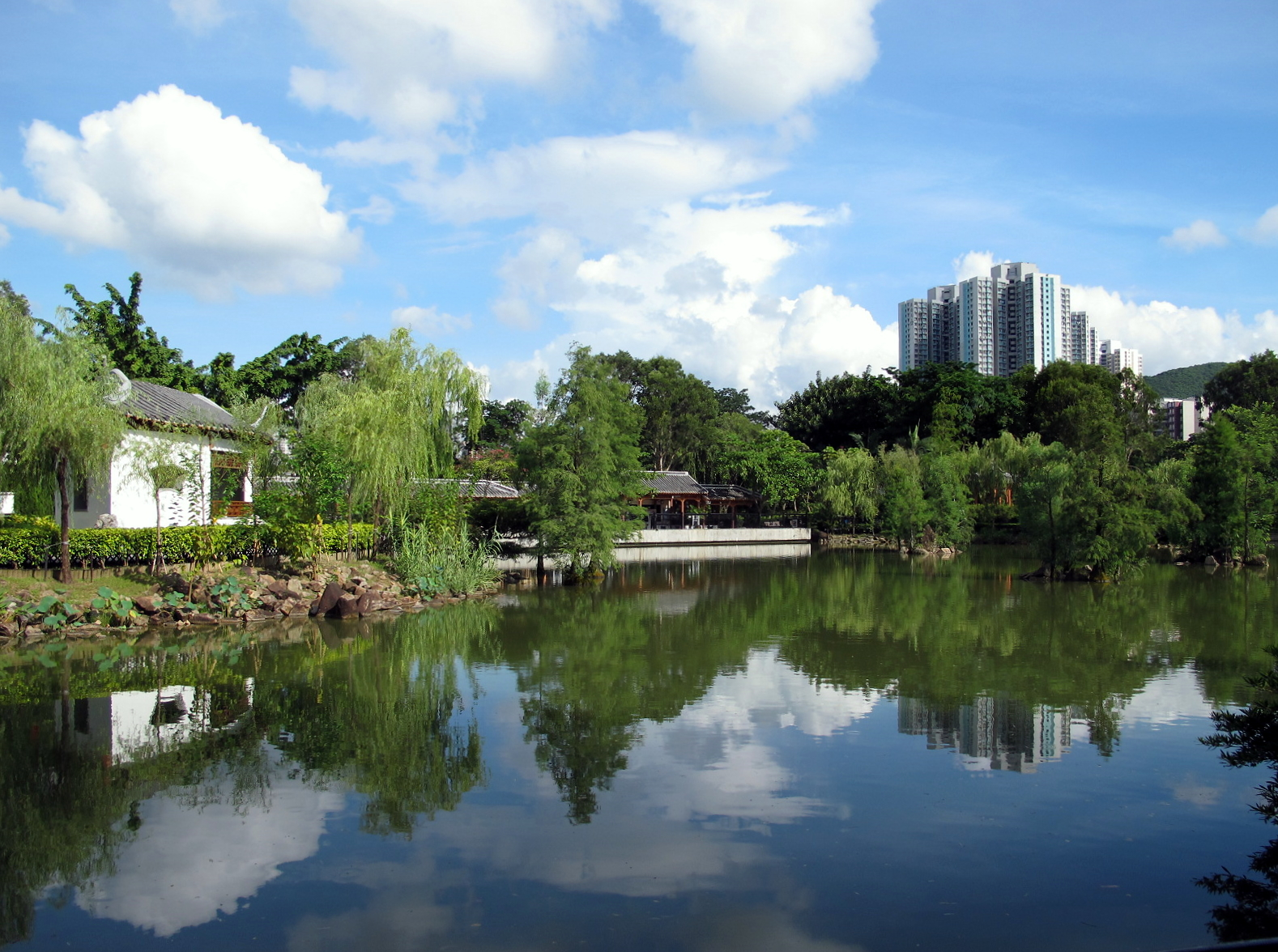
- Lake and Pavilion in North District Park in July 2012
- Interactive map of North District Park
- Location: Sheung Shui, New Territories, Hong Kong
- Area: 8.6 hectares (21 acres)
- Established: 10 March 1990; 36 years ago
- Opening: Cheung Yan-lung
- Owner: Hong Kong Government
- Operator: Leisure and Cultural Services Department

North District Park (Chinese: 北區公園) is a public park situated between Sheung Shui and Fanling in North District, Hong Kong. It opened on 10 March 1990. It is one of the largest parks in Hong Kong. Sheung Shui Centre and Sheung Shui Town Centre are located near its northern side, and adjacent to its southeastern border is the village Fanling Wai.

== See also ==
- List of urban public parks and gardens in Hong Kong
