= Hoi Bun Road Park =

Public park in Kwun Tong, Hong Kong

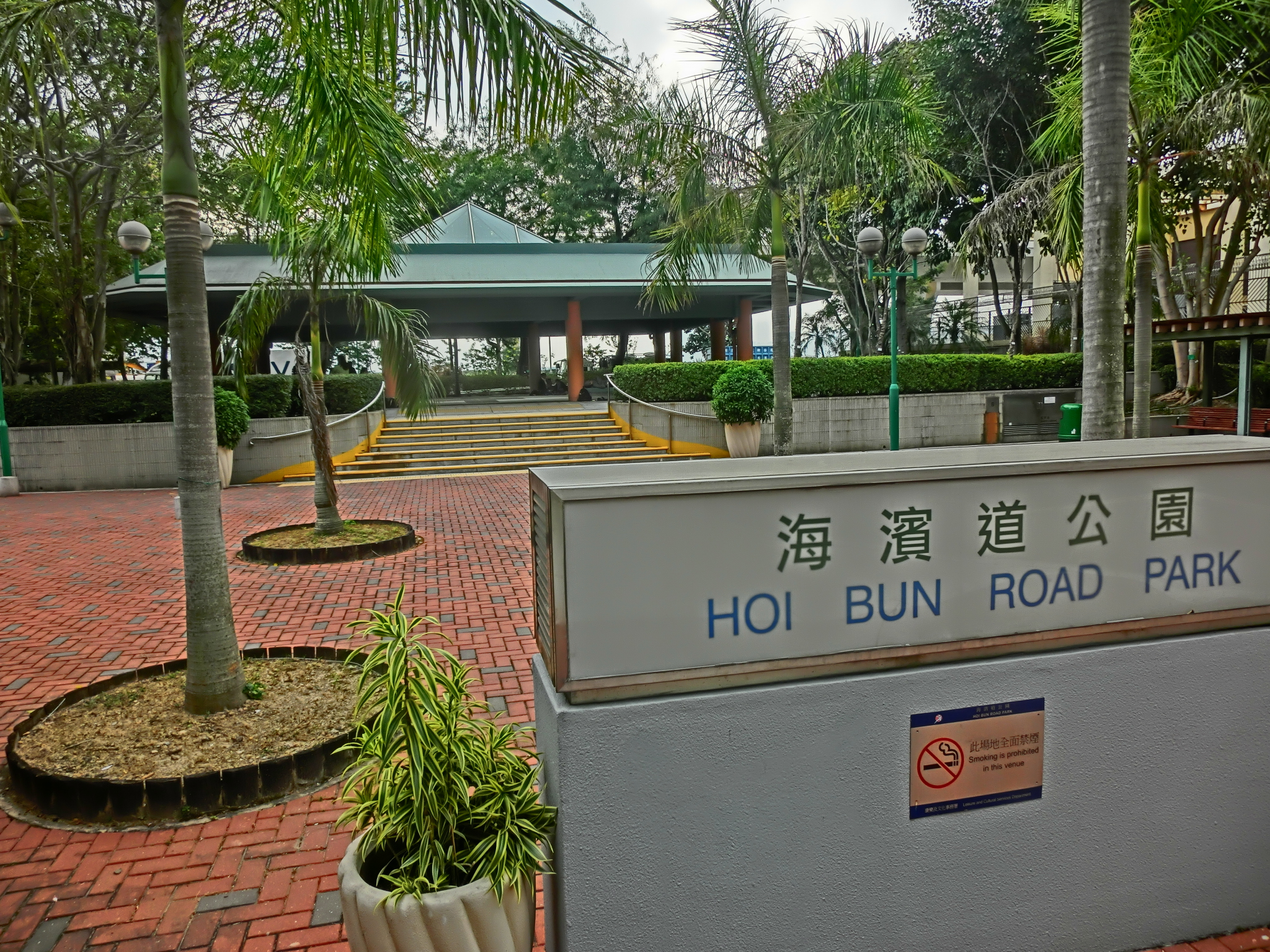
- Entrance (prior to reconstruction)

- Location within Hong Kong
- Type: Public park
- Location: Kwun Tong, Hong Kong
- Coordinates: 22.3149°N 114.2155°E
- Area: 0.93 hectares (2.3 acres)
- Opened: 1990; 36 years ago
- Operator: Leisure and Cultural Services Department
- Status: Open year round

Hoi Bun Road Park (Chinese: 海濱道公園) is a public park in Kwun Tong, Kowloon, Hong Kong.

== History ==
The 9,300-square-metre park was built at a cost of $18.8 million for the enjoyment of the working population in the Kwun Tong industrial estate. It was designed by the local architecture firm Spence Robinson and was opened in 1990 by the Urban Council.

Prior to redevelopment (see below), the park featured a five-a-side football pitch, a pavilion with table tennis tables, a stepped planter with a look-off point, Chinese chess tables, and a public toilet block.

From 2019 to 2021, the park was closed for demolition and complete reconstruction. It reopened in August 2021.

== See also ==
- Kwun Tong Promenade – a nearby park with a similar Chinese name
- List of urban public parks and gardens in Hong Kong
