= Ma On Shan Public Library =

Public library in Hong Kong

Coordinates: 22.4262°N 114.2303°E

- 馬鞍山公共圖書館
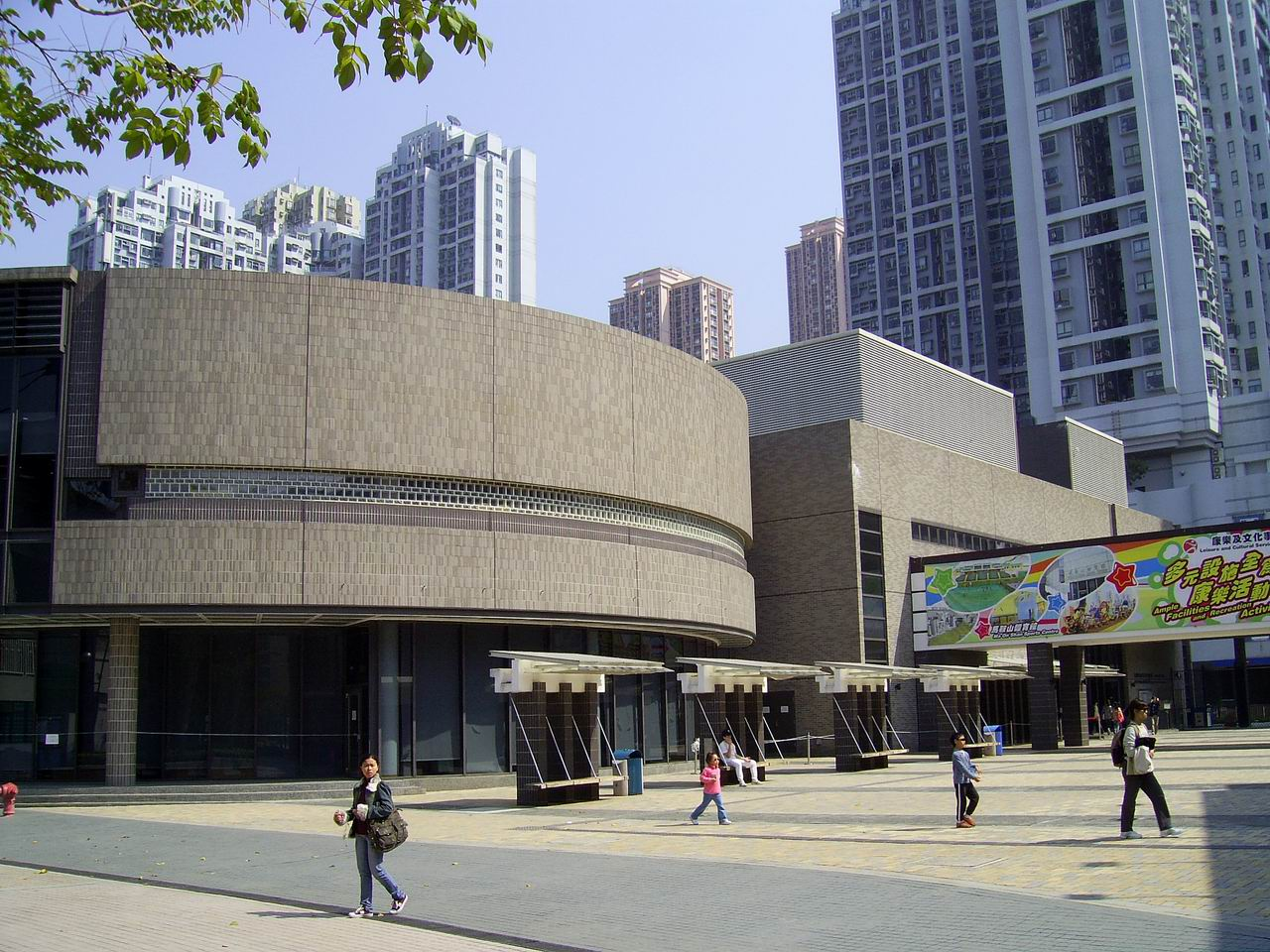
- Location: 14 On Chun Street, Ma On Shan, Sha Tin, Hong Kong
- Type: Public
- Established: 2 April 2005; 20 years ago

Collection
- Size: 150,000+ items

Other information
- Parent organisation: Leisure and Cultural Services Department
- Affiliation: Hong Kong Public Libraries
- Website: Official website

Ma On Shan Public Library
- Traditional Chinese: 馬鞍山公共圖書館
- Simplified Chinese: 马鞍山公共图书馆
Transcriptions
Standard Mandarin
- Hanyu Pinyin: Mǎ'ānshān Gōnggòng Túshūguǎn
Yue: Cantonese
- Yale Romanization: Máh ōn sāan gūng guhng tòuh syū gún
- Jyutping: Ma5 on1 saan1 gung1 gung6 tou4 syu1 gun2

Ma On Shan Public Library (Chinese: 馬鞍山公共圖書館) is a public library located at 14 On Chun Street, Ma On Shan, Hong Kong. It opened on 2 April 2005 and was built next to Ma On Shan Park. It occupies an area of 2,200 square metres (24,000 sq ft). It has a characteristic main building in a cylindrical shape. The library has over 150,000 books.

== Facility ==
- Study Hall
- Multimedia Room
- Self-service locker
