= Ma On Shan Promenade =

Public park in Hong Kong

Coordinates: 22°24′32″N 114°13′13″E

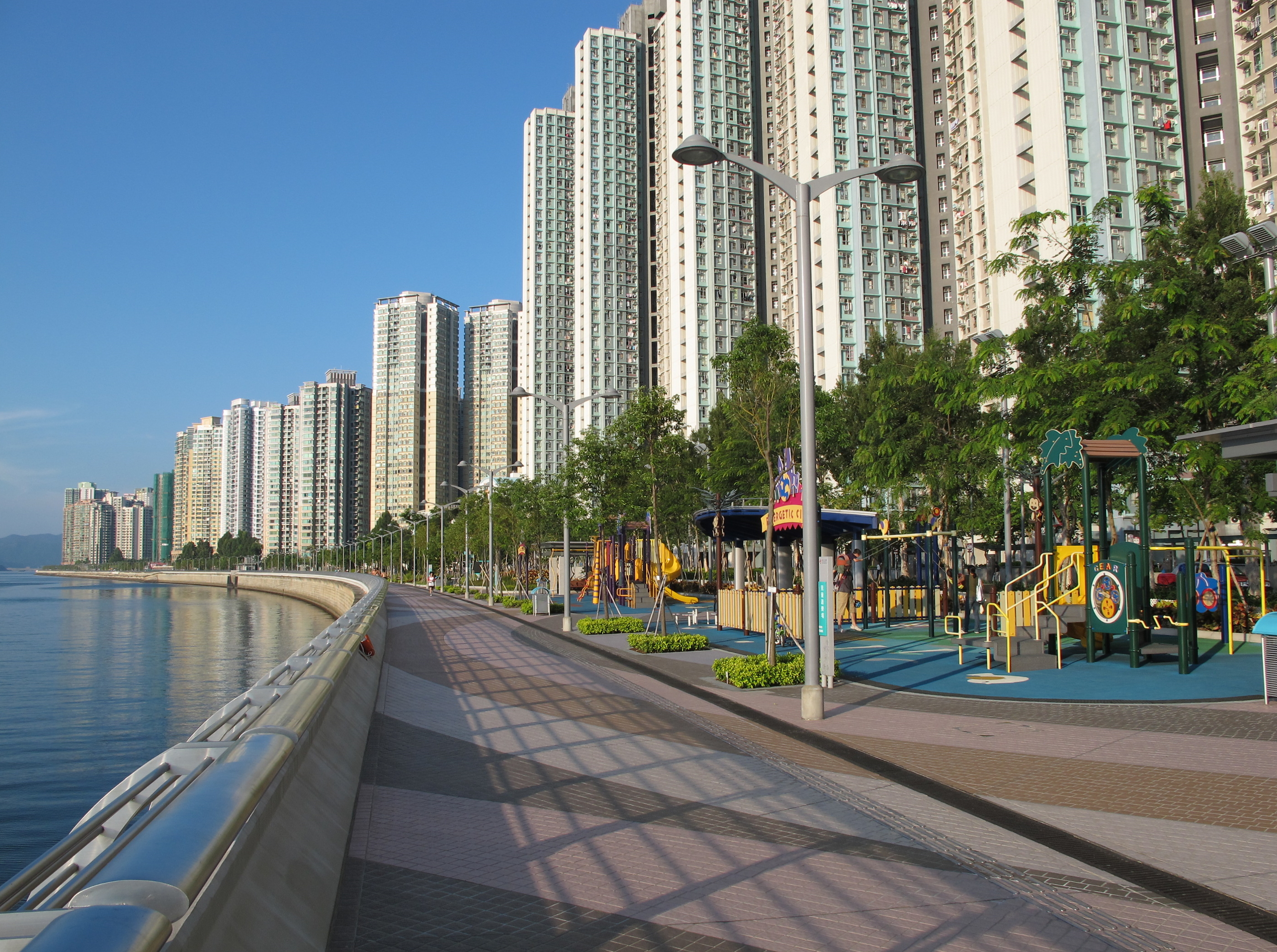
Ma On Shan Promenade in September 2010

Ma On Shan Promenade (Chinese: 馬鞍山海濱長廊) is an urban waterfront park in Ma On Shan, Hong Kong. The promenade occupies an area of 5.2 hectares and is 3.2 km long. It was constructed at a cost of HK$220 million and was built in three phases, opening on 18 July 2009, 10 January 2010, and 11 June 2010 respectively.

== See also ==
- List of urban public parks and gardens in Hong Kong
