= Sha Tin Park =

Public park in Shatin, Hong Kong

Coordinates: 22.3800°N 114.1903°E

- 沙田公園
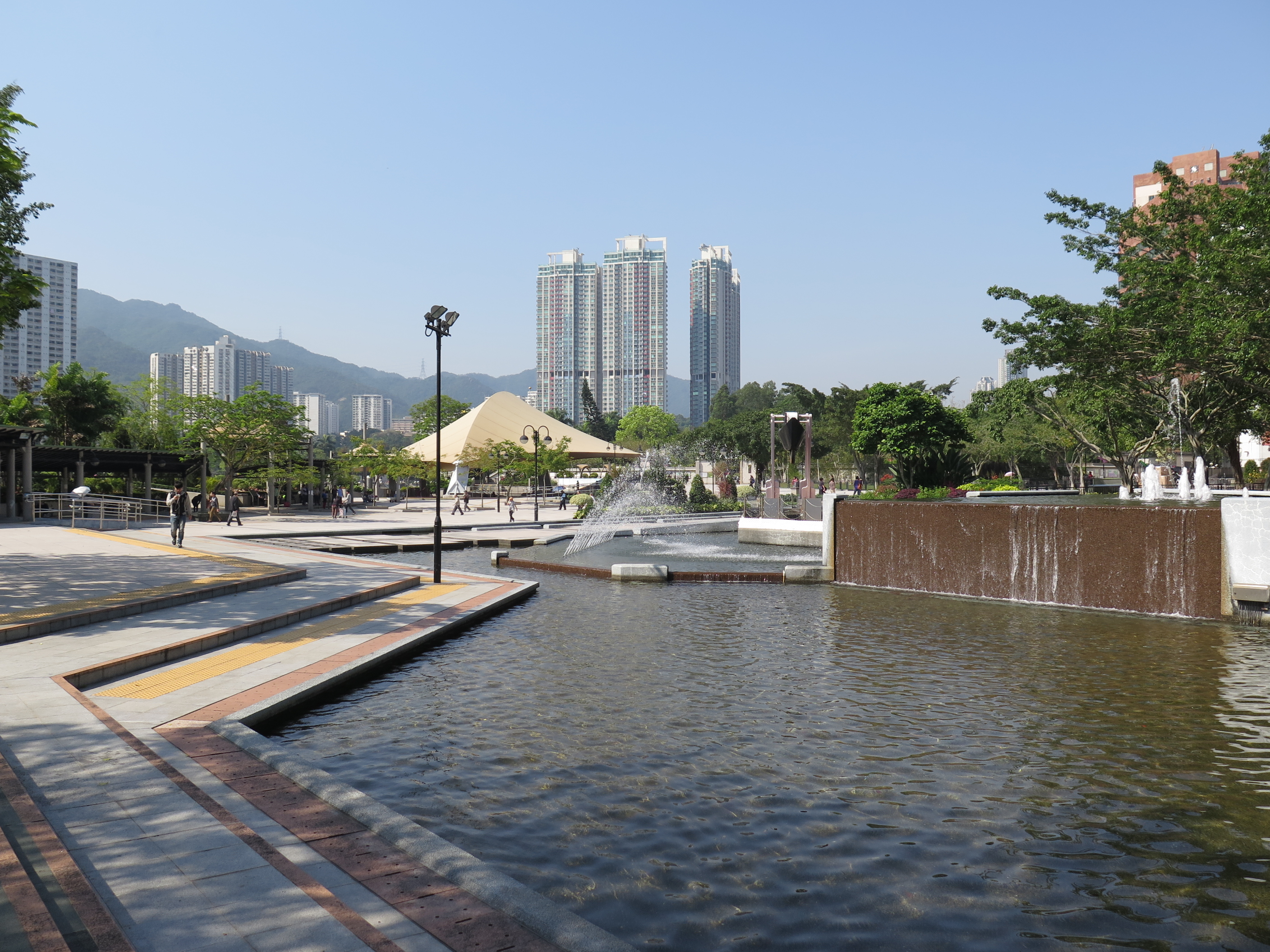
- Interactive map of Sha Tin Park
- Location: 2 Yuen Wo Road, Sha Tin, Hong Kong
- Area: 8.05 hectares (19.9 acres)
- Opened: 24 August 1988; 37 years ago
- Owner: Hong Kong Government
- Manager: Leisure and Cultural Services Department

Sha Tin Park
- Chinese: 沙田公園
Transcriptions
Standard Mandarin
- Hanyu Pinyin: Shātián Gōngyuán
Yue: Cantonese
- Yale Romanization: Sāa tìhn gūng yún
- Jyutping: Saa1 tin4 gung1 jyun2

Sha Tin Central Park
- Chinese: 沙田中央公園
Transcriptions
Standard Mandarin
- Hanyu Pinyin: Shātián Zhōngyāng Gōngyuán
Yue: Cantonese
- Yale Romanization: Sāa tìhn jūng yēung gūng yún
- Jyutping: Saa1 tin4 zung1 joeng1 gung1 jyun2

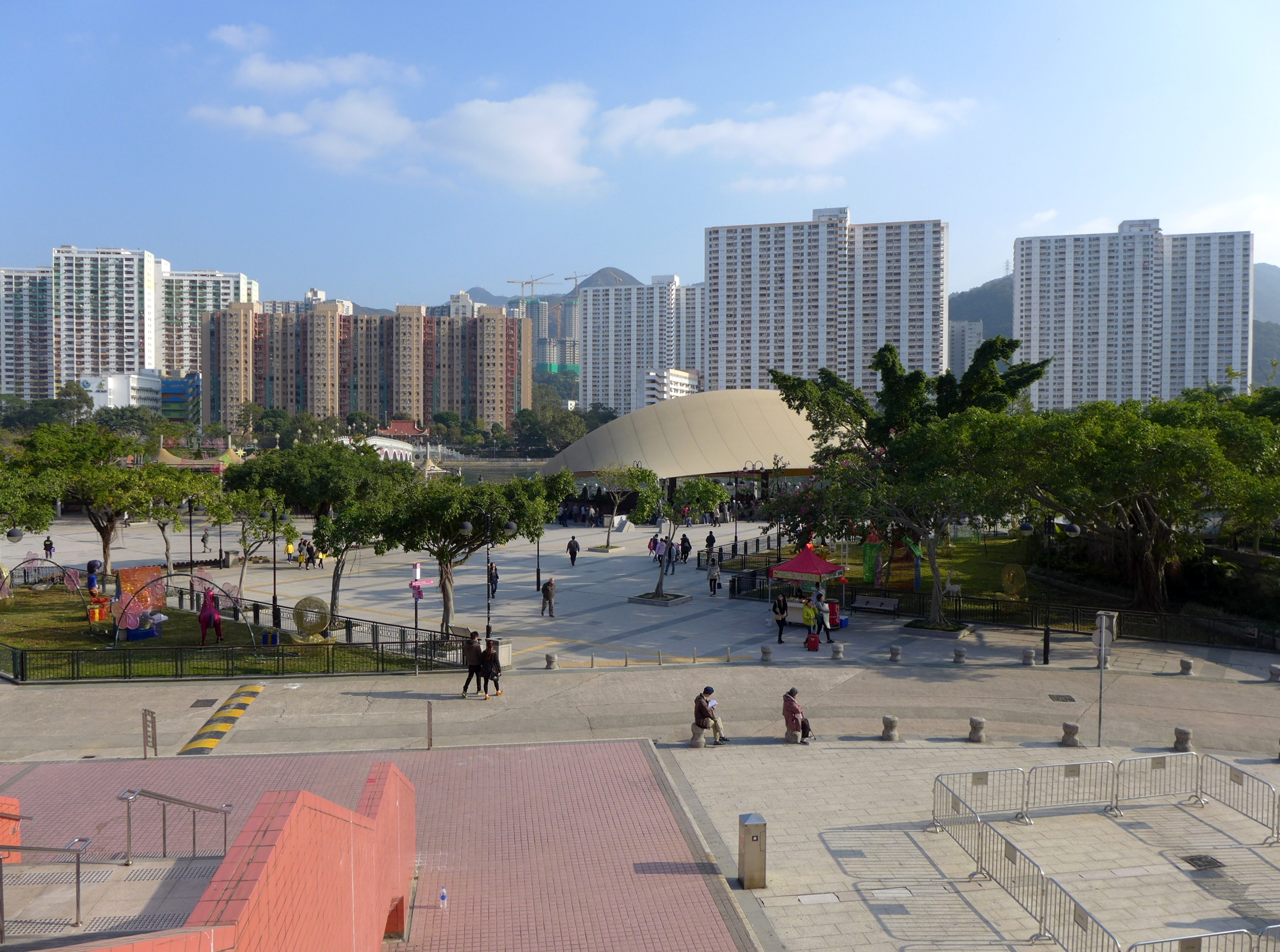
Sha Tin Park

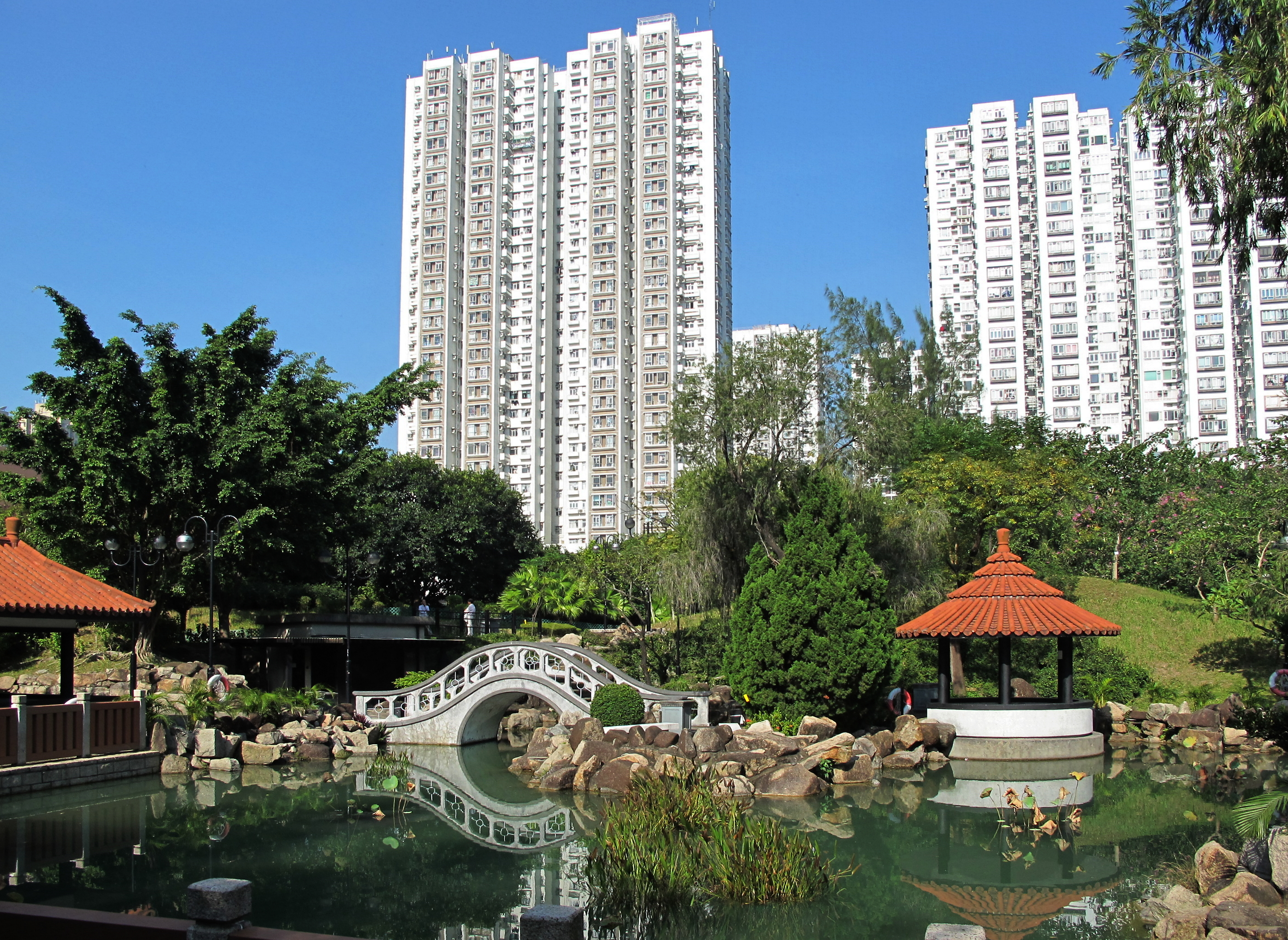
North Garden

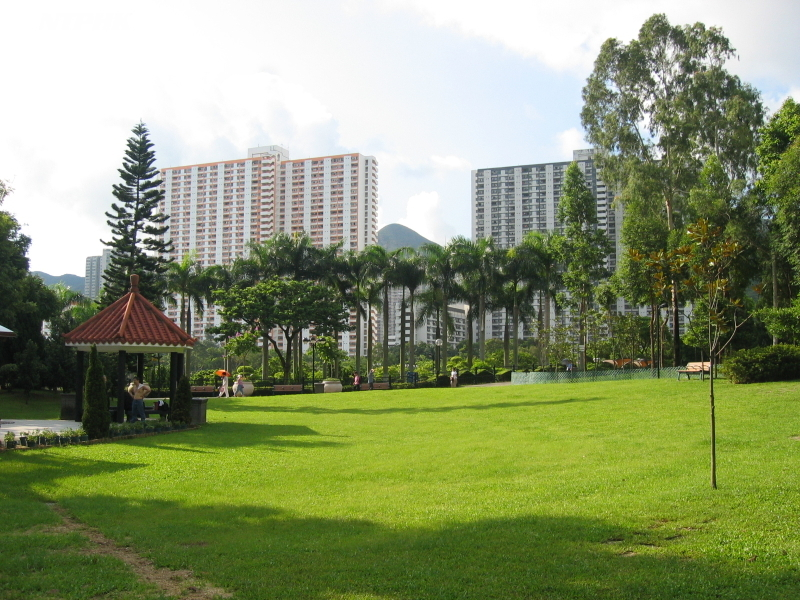
Lawn

Sha Tin Park, formerly known as Sha Tin Central Park, is a park at 2 Yuen Wo Road, Sha Tin, Hong Kong. It is situated along the Shing Mun River in the new town of Sha Tin, next to the New Town Plaza, Sha Tin Town Hall, and Sha Tin Public Library.

The park occupies 8.05 hectares (19.89 acres) of land, and is managed by Leisure and Cultural Services Department. The opening hours are from 6:30 am to 11:00 pm.

== History ==
Most of the land that the park occupies was reclaimed from Tide Cove during the construction of the Sha Tin New Town, though some of the land existed beforehand and was previously occupied by the Sha Tin Airfield, a military air base.

While the park was under construction, a "sneak preview" was provided to the public as it was temporarily opened from 14 to 17 March 1987 for the Hong Kong Flower Show.

The park was opened on 24 August 1988. It was then named as Sha Tin Central Park. It was built and administered by the Regional Council.

Shortly following the Tiananmen Square massacre, the Hong Kong Alliance in Support of Patriotic Democratic Movements of China erected a replica of the Goddess of Democracy statue in Sha Tin Central Park, on a temporary basis, with the approval of the council. Over 4,000 people attended its unveiling on 3 July 1989, with many laying wreathes at the foot of the statue. In 1997, the pro-Beijing camp within the council voted down another application by the alliance to temporarily exhibit the Pillar of Shame statue in the park on the anniversary of the massacre.

== Facilities ==
Facilities include the Main Plaza, Amphitheatre, South Garden, North Garden, Artists' Corner, Walled Garden, Verandah, Azalea Garden, Scented Garden, Children Playgrounds (in both South Garden and North Garden), Light Refreshment Kiosks and Birds Conservation Area in the park.

In the Scented Garden, Michelia figo and Osmanthus fragrans are planted.

Artists' Corner is an open area for the artists exhibiting, displaying, sharing, and selling their personal products with the public every Saturday, Sunday, and Public holiday. There is a Wedding Garden in the Artists' Corner.

== See also ==
- Leisure and Cultural Services Department
- List of urban public parks and gardens in Hong Kong
