= Fui Yiu Ha =

Fui Yiu Ha (Chinese: 灰窰下) is the name of several villages in Hong Kong:

- Fui Yiu Ha (Sai Kung) in Sai Kung Town
- Fui Yiu Ha (Tung Chung) in Tung Chung
- Fui Yiu Ha New Village in Sha Tin District
