= Sand Martin Bridge =

Road bridge in Hong Kong

Sand Martin Bridge 沙燕橋
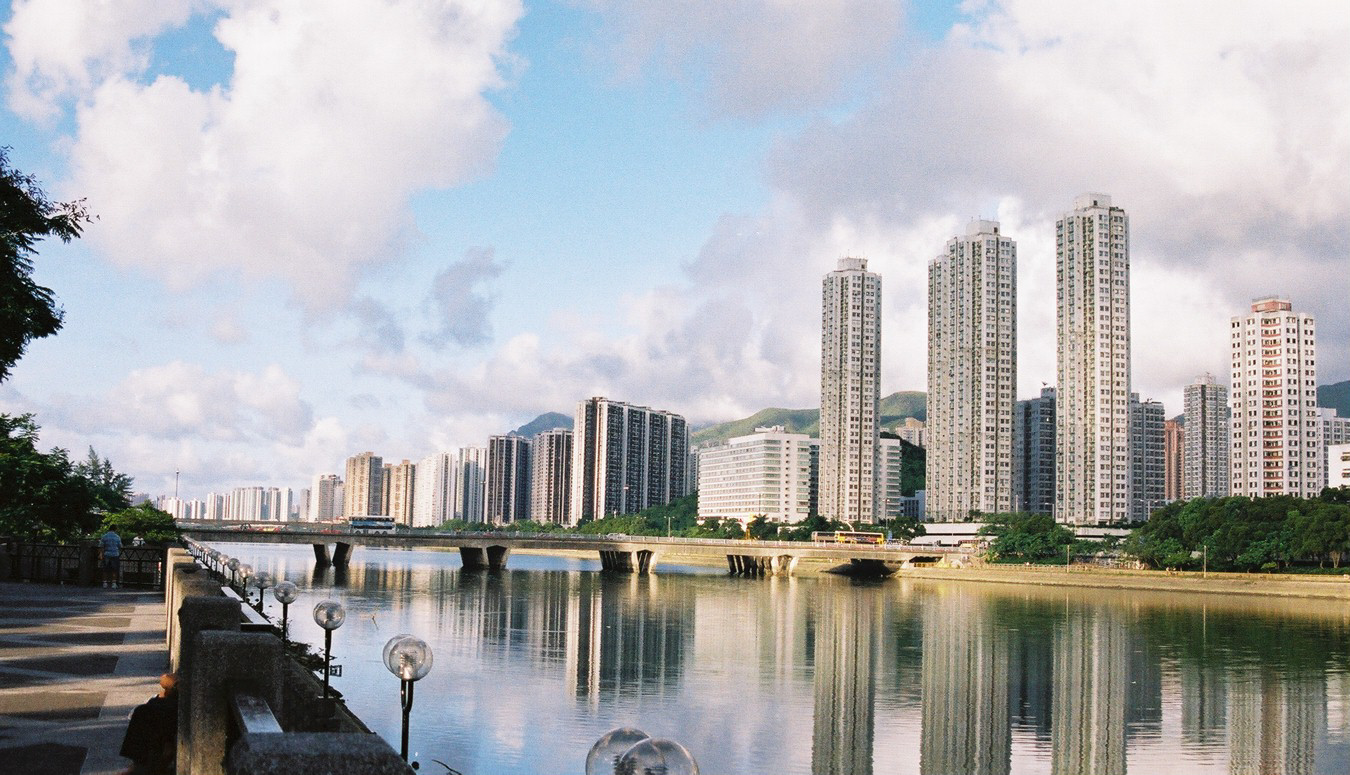
- Coordinates: 22°22′55″N 114°11′35″E
- Carries: Sha Tin Rural Committee Road
- Crosses: Shing Mun River
- Locale: Sha Tin, New Territories, Hong Kong
- Named for: The Shatin Martins (Little League Team)
- Preceded by: Lek Yuen Bridge
- Followed by: Banyan Bridge

Characteristics
- Material: Reinforced concrete
- Total length: 0.22 km

The Sand Martin Bridge (Chinese: 沙燕橋) is one of Hong Kong's bridges, part of the Sha Tin Rural Committee Road, named after the Shatin Martins, the first baseball team from Hong Kong to win a league. The Sand Martin bridge crosses the Shing Mun River, connecting Sha Tin Town Centre with Sha Tin Wai.

== Construction ==
The Sand Martin Bridge connects to the Yuen Wo Road to the west and the Tai Chung Kiu Road to the east, connecting Sha Tin Town Centre and Lek Yuen to Sha Tin Wai. The bridge has a four-lane dual carriageway with pedestrian walkways and cycling tracks, bounded by aluminum vehicular parapets and pedestrian fences.

== Naming ==
The Sand Martin Bridge is named after the Shatin Martins Little League Team, after their victory in the 1983 Hong Kong Little League Open.

The Hong Kong movie Weeds on Fire, about the Shatin Martins, featured shots of the Sand Martin bridge.
