= Tse Uk =

Tse Uk (Chinese: 謝屋) is the name of several villages in Hong Kong:

- Tse Uk Tsuen (Yuen Long District) (謝屋村) in Yuen Long District
- Tse Uk Village (謝屋村) in Sha Tin District
- Tse Uk (謝屋), a hamlet part of Tan Ka Wan
