= Sha Tin =

District in Hong Kong

Sha Tin 沙田
- Neighbourhood
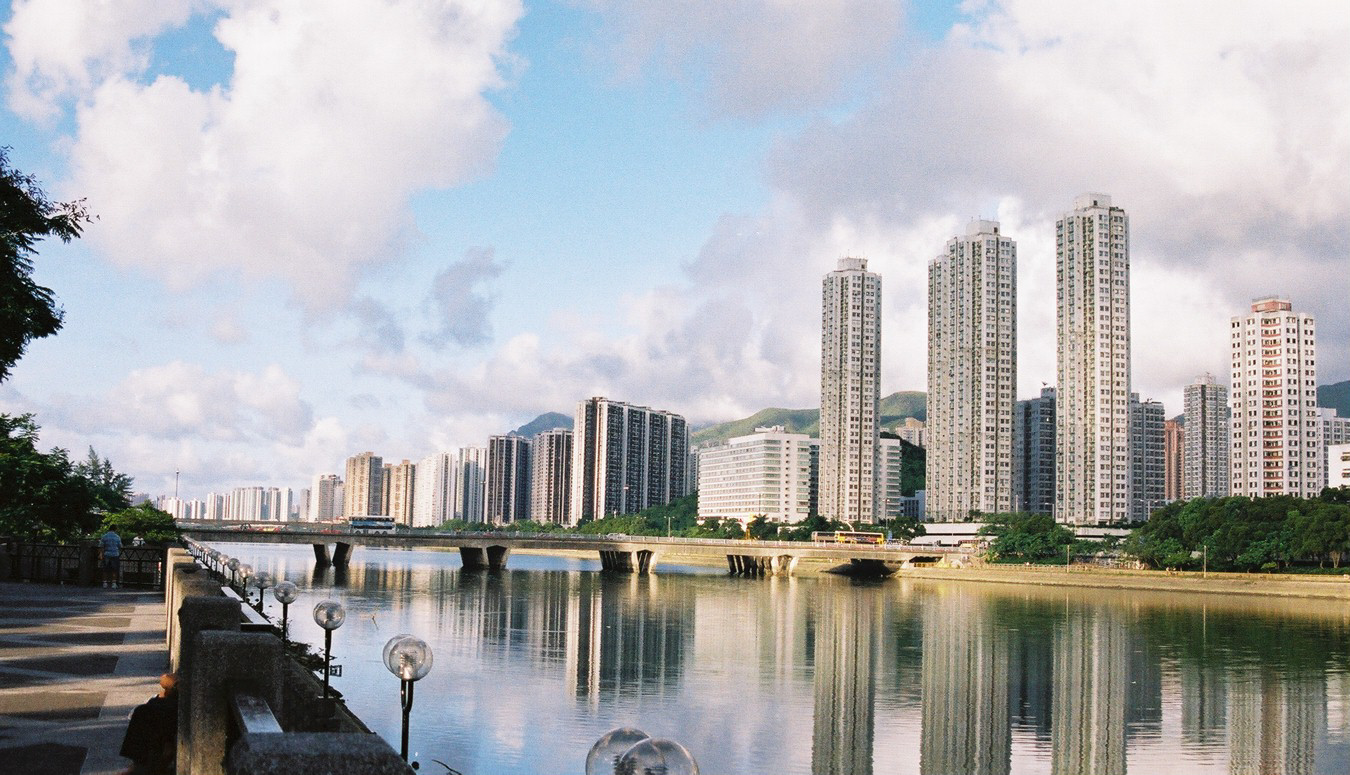
- Shing Mun River Promenade

- Location within Hong Kong
- Coordinates: 22°22′30″N 114°11′00″E
- Country: Hong Kong
- District: Sha Tin District
- Time zone: UTC+8 (HKT)

Sha Tin
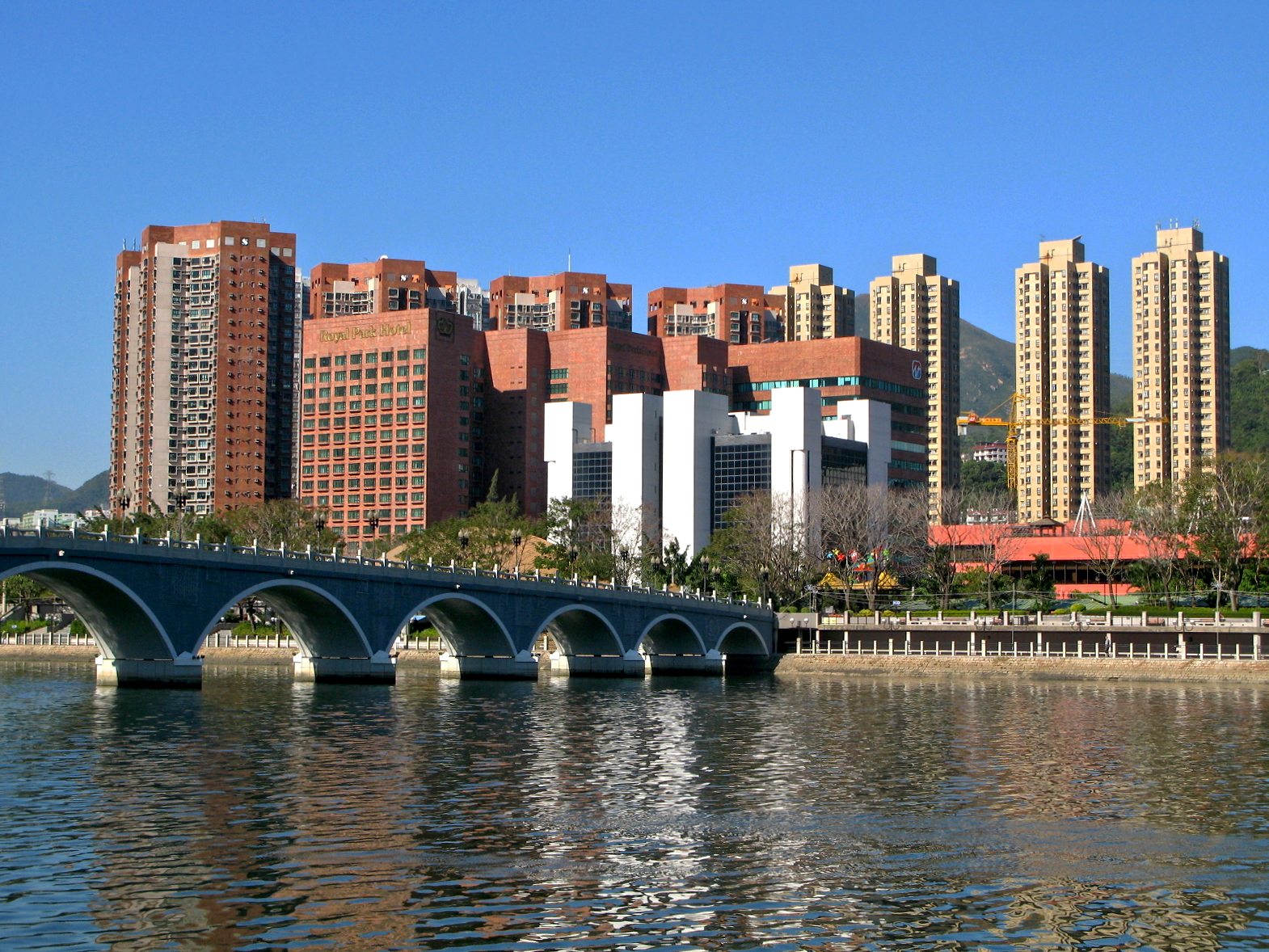
- Lek Yuen Bridge over Shing Mun River in Sha Tin central
- Chinese: 沙田
- Jyutping: Saa1 Tin4
- Literal meaning: sandy field
Transcriptions
Standard Mandarin
- Hanyu Pinyin: Shātián
Yue: Cantonese
- Yale Romanization: Sā Tìhn
- Jyutping: Saa1 Tin4
- IPA: [sa˥.tʰin˩]

Sha Tin, also spelt Shatin, is a neighbourhood along Shing Mun River in the eastern New Territories, Hong Kong. Administratively, it is part of the Sha Tin District. Sha Tin is one of the neighbourhoods of the Sha Tin New Town project.

The new town was founded in 1973 under the New Towns Development Programme of the Hong Kong government. Its current name was named after the nearby village of Sha Tin Wai. The literal English translation is 'Sand Fields'.

== History ==
Tai Wai Village, located in Tai Wai, next to Sha Tin, and the oldest and largest walled village in Sha Tin District, was built in 1574, during the Ming Dynasty.

Before British rule in Hong Kong, the area of Sha Tin and its vicinity was referred to as Lek Yuen (瀝源, 沥源, lit. "source of trickling" or "source of clear water"). In 1899, when colonial surveyors George P Tate and his assistant William John Newland were dispatched to survey the New Territories, they likely mistook the name of the Sha Tin Wai village as the name of the area and hence "Sha Tin" has been used ever since. Nowadays, the original name is used to refer to Lek Yuen Estate.

Sha Tin was the location of the first flight of a powered aircraft in Hong Kong in 1911. The aeroplane, a Farman Mk II bi-plane named "Wanda", was flown by Belgian pilot Charles Van den Born. The plane was later named as the Spirit of Sha Tin (沙田精神號). A full size replica of this plane now hangs in Hong Kong International Airport.

The area was formerly agricultural farmland. Before Sha Tin's development into a new town, Hung Mui Kuk (紅梅谷), southwest of Sha Tin, was perennially the main site for school picnics. The hillside area remains a popular barbecue site.

In 1956, a market township: Sha Tin Hui, was established on top of unused agricultural fields at the present location of Sha Tin Centre Street and New Town Plaza shopping centre, next to the Sha Tin station of the MTR East Rail line. The township was founded by Den Lau (劉贊瑞), the son of businessman Lau Hey Shing (劉希成) who owned the 150,000 sq ft. plot of land. Sha Tin Hui contained five streets with shops, restaurants, and residential buildings. Modern facilities such as a post office and a cinema were also put in place. In 1962 Sha Tin Hui was severely damaged by typhoon Wanda, and subsequently had to be rebuilt. In 1979 Sha Tin Hui was demolished as a result of the government's expansion plans. The land was leased to Sun Hung Kai properties, who then developed the area into New Town Plaza shopping centre.

Starting in the 1970s, the area became part of the Sha Tin New Town development. Since then, the economy in the area has greatly improved and living standards have also increased. Sha Tin Town Centre was developed during the mid-1980s to help "link the town's currently dispersed residents into one cohesive community." The 18-hectare site, adjacent to the railway station, was built up in stages to house an array of uses including the New Town Plaza, numerous smaller shopping malls, Sha Tin Park, a magistracy, library, town hall, marriage registry, hotel, town square, and several residential towers.

== Geography ==
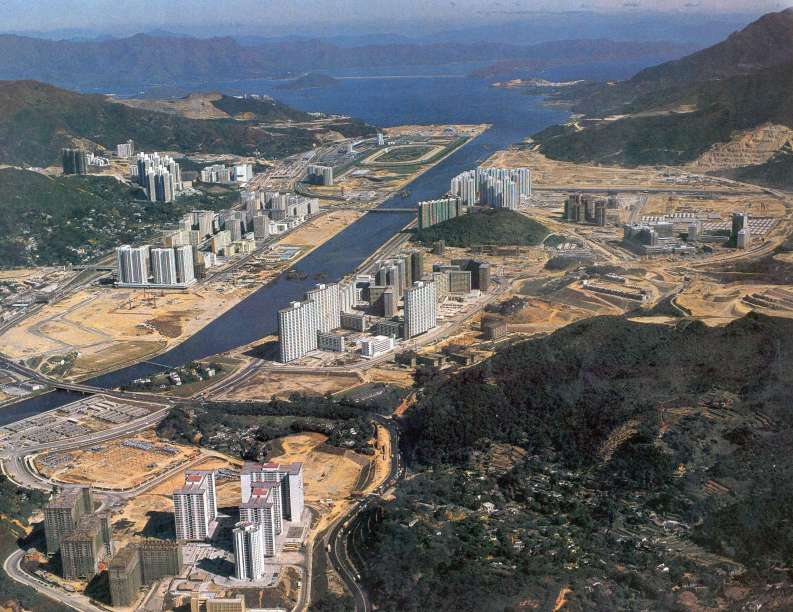
Sha Tin New Town under development in the late 1970s.

Sha Tin is located in a valley, on both sides of the Shing Mun River, running from the southwest to the northeast. It is bordered by Tai Wai in the southwest and by Fo Tan (left bank) and Shek Mun (right bank) in the northeast.

=== Cross-border activities ===
Due to their proximity to the Shenzhen border, towns in the northern parts of Hong Kong, notably Sheung Shui and Yuen Long, have become hubs for parallel traders who have been buying up large quantities of goods, forcing up local prices and disrupting the daily lives of local citizens. Since 2012, there has been an increase in mainland parallel traders arriving in the North District of Hong Kong to re-export infant formula and household products – goods popular with mainlanders – across the border to Shenzhen. The volume of smuggling activity spilled over into Tuen Mun and Sha Tin in 2014.

The first anti-parallel trading protest was started at Sheung Shui in September 2012. As government efforts to limit the adverse impact of mainland trafficking were widely seen as inadequate, so there have been further subsequent protests in towns in the New Territories including Sha Tin.

== Housing ==
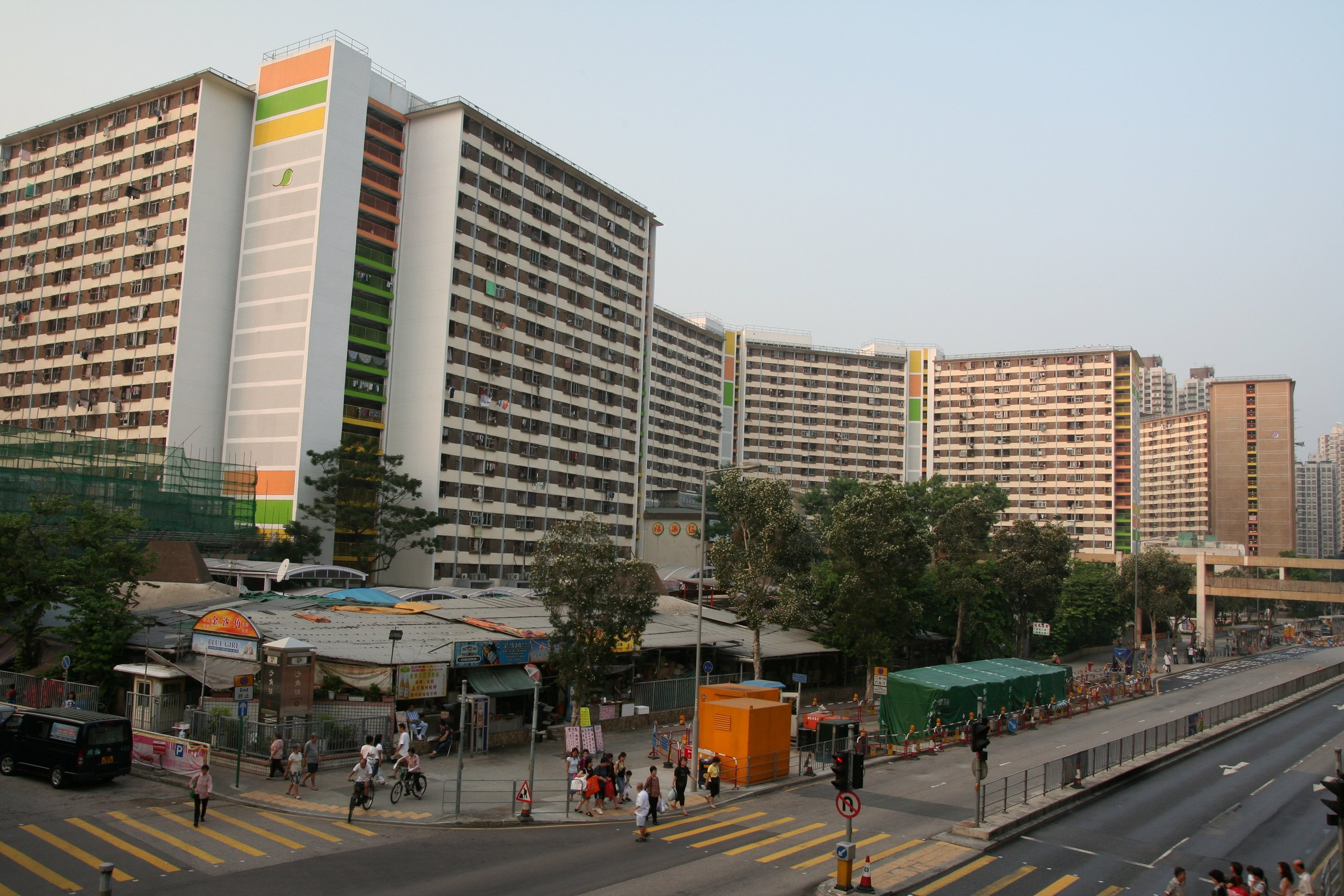
Sand Martin House of Sha Kok Estate, a second phase public housing complex in Sha Tin Wai.

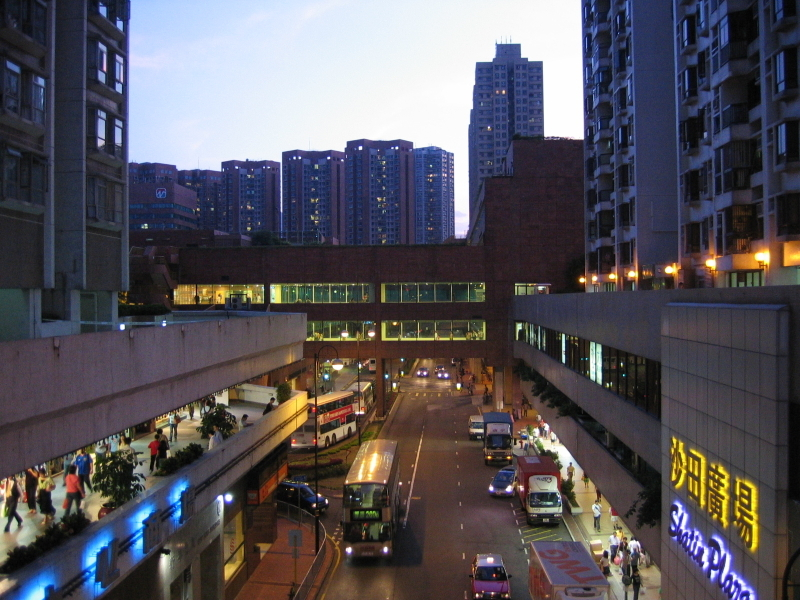
Sha Tin Plaza in the evening.

=== Private housing estates ===
Private housing estates in Sha Tin include:

- City One
- Lucky Plaza
- Sha Tin Centre
- Wai Wah Centre
- Sha Tin Plaza
- Garden Rivera (河畔花園)
- Fung Shing Court
- Belair Gardens
- Castello, Hong Kong

=== Villages ===
South bank of Shing Mun River. From west to east:

- Sha Tin Tau
- Tsang Tai Uk
- Tsok Pok Hang
- Fui Yiu Ha New Village
- Sha Tin Wai
- Wong Uk
- To Shek
- Chap Wai Kon
- Ngau Pei Sha

North bank of Shing Mun River. From west to east:

- Lai Chi Yuen
- Tin Liu (田寮), part of Pai Tau
- Pai Tau
- Pai Tau Hang
- Sheung Wo Che
- Ha Wo Che

== Shopping centres ==
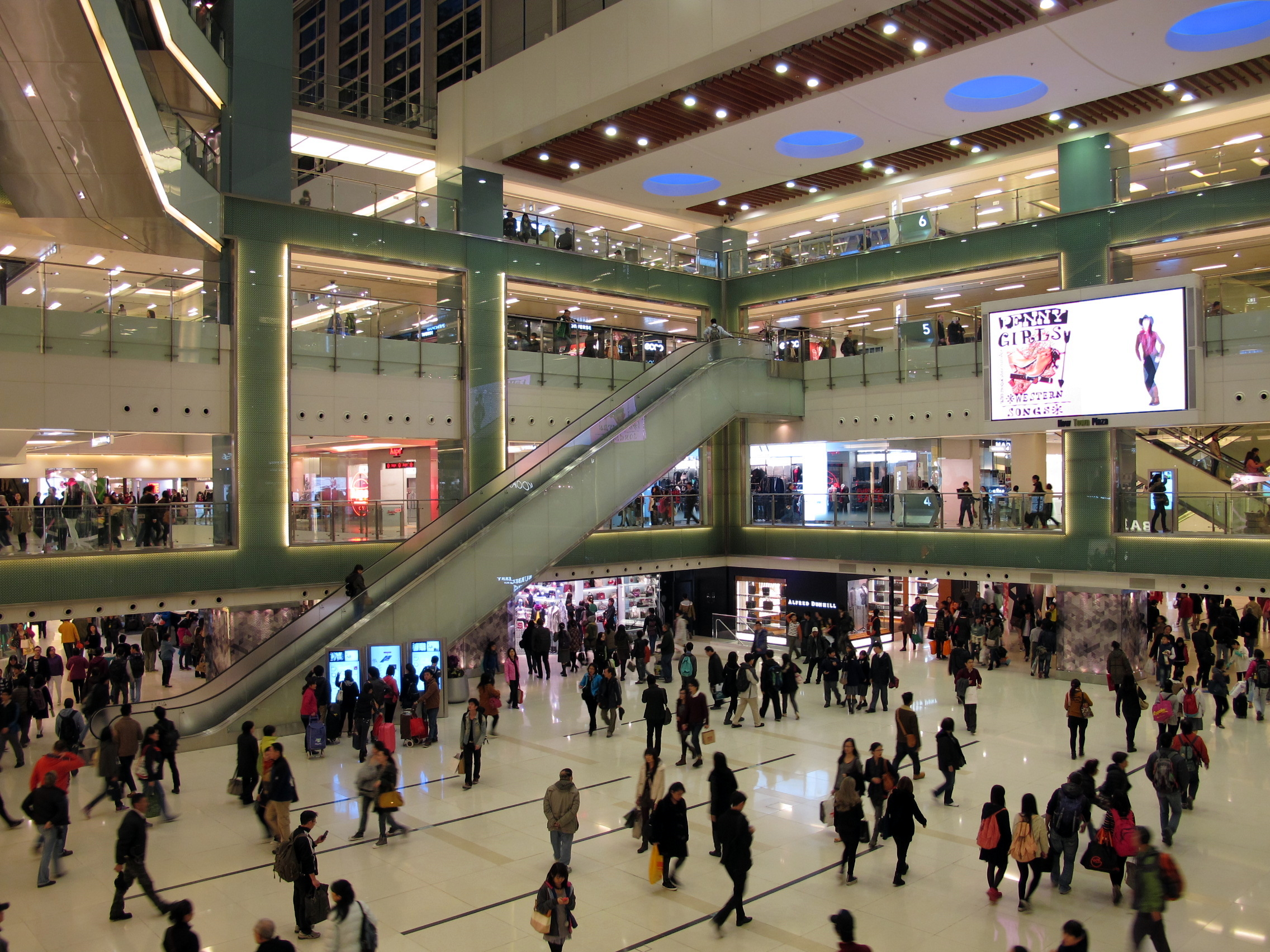
New Town Plaza after renovation.

- New Town Plaza (新城市廣場)
- Citylink Plaza (連城廣場)
- Sha Tin Plaza (沙田廣場)
- Sha Tin Centre (沙田中心)
- Lucky Plaza (好運中心)
- Hilton Plaza (希爾頓中心)
- Wai Wah Centre (偉華中心)
- Fortune City One (置富第一城)
- Grand Central Plaza – HomeSquare (新城市中央廣場)

== Economy ==
Lukfook, the jewellery company, has its head office in Metropole Square (新都廣場), Sha Tin.

== Architecture ==
While having been mass developed in the 1970s, Shatin's architecture maintains a degree of diversity. Most public housing estates were designed in a modern architectural style. Several shopping centres, hotels and government buildings around Shatin Central are clad in red brick.

== Notable places of worship ==
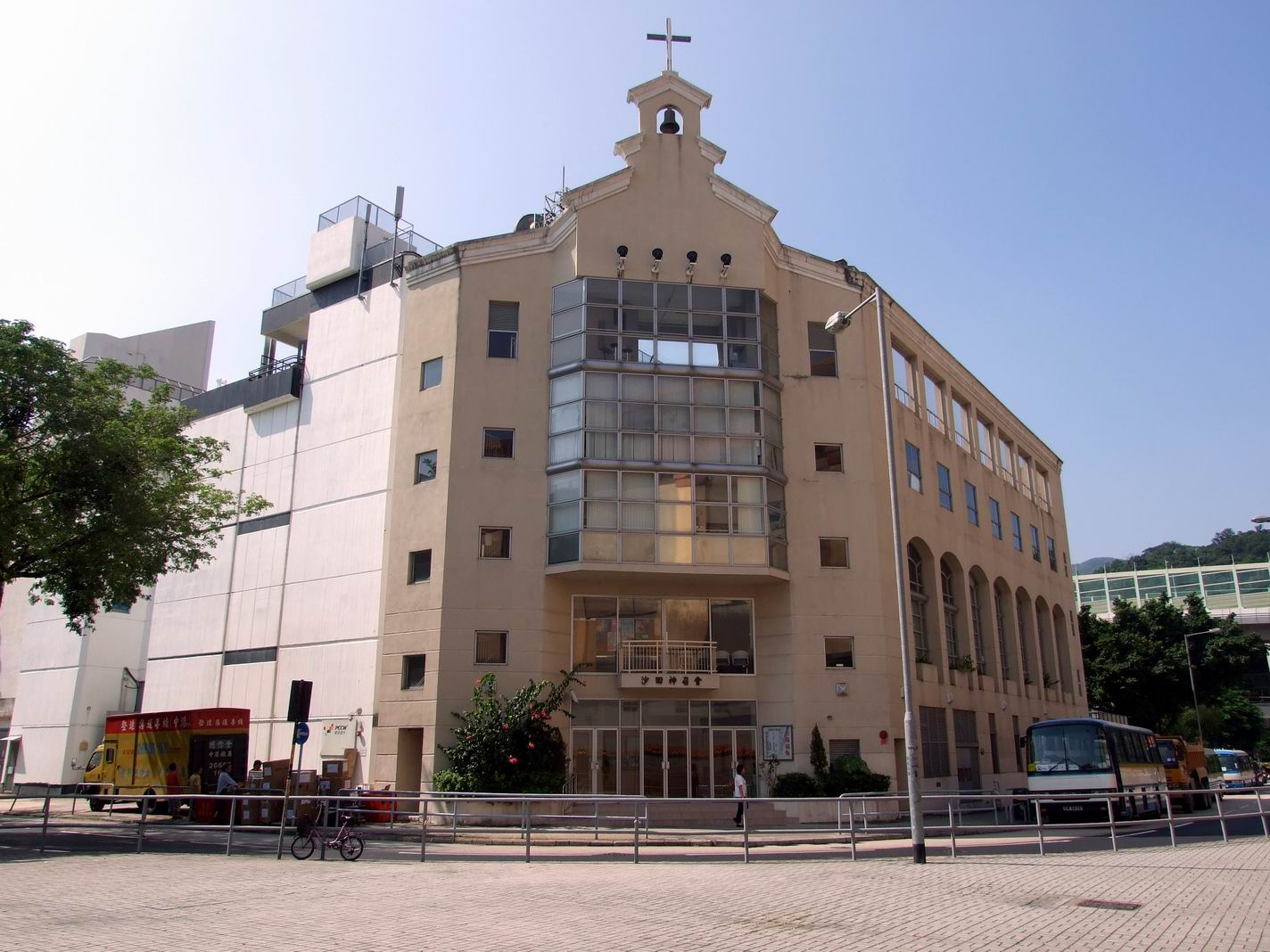
Shatin Assembly of God Church

- Sai Lam Temple (西林寺)
- Sam Yuen Temple (三元宮)
- Wai Chuen Monastery (慧泉寺)
- Dao Hop Yuen (道合園)
- Ten Thousand Buddhas Monastery (萬佛寺)
- Tao Fung Shan Christian Centre (道風山基督教叢林)
- International Fellowship North, English speaking Christian church in Siu Lek Yuen.
- Shatin Baptist Church (沙田浸信會)
- Shatin Anglican Church

== Health ==
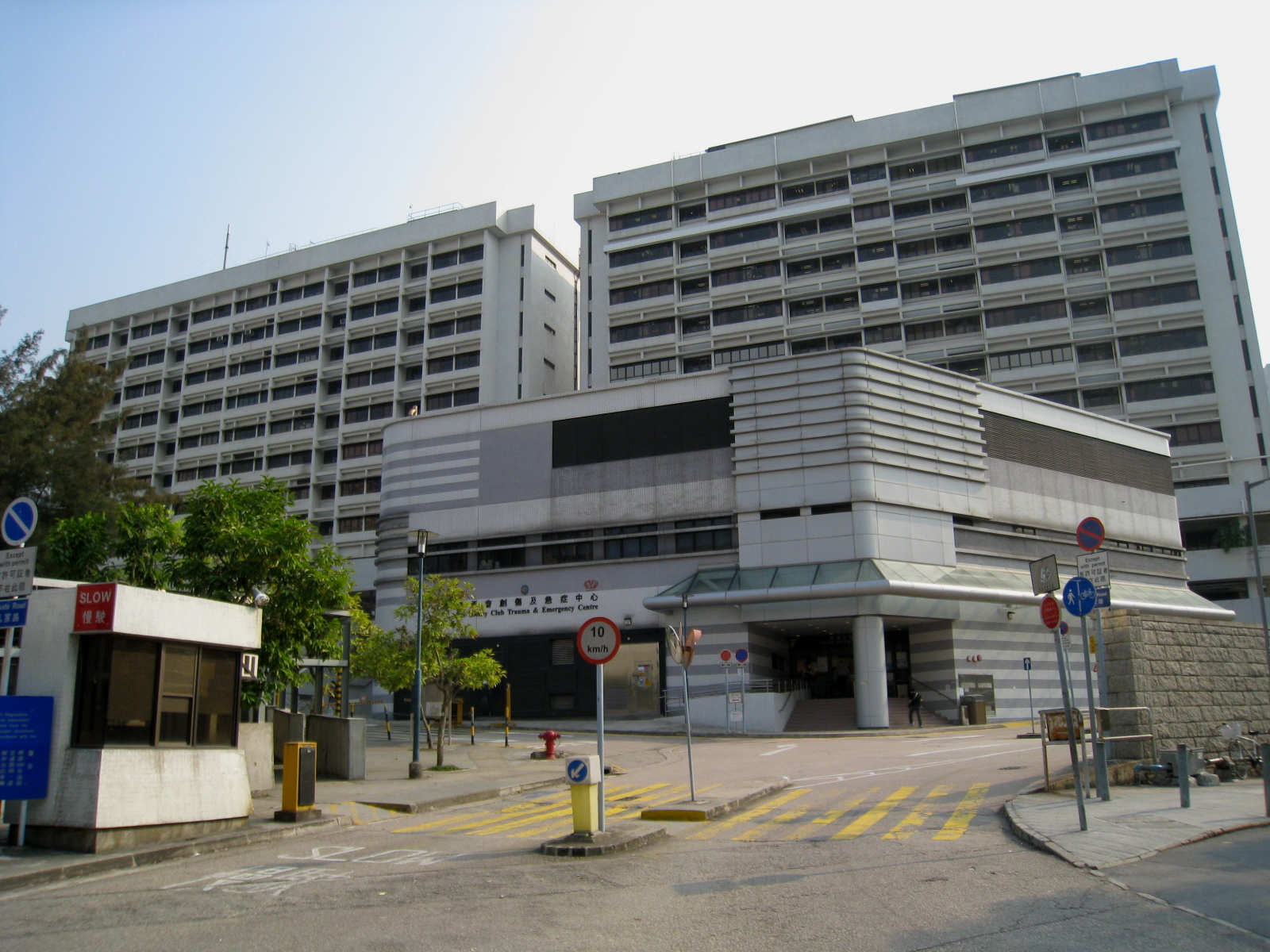
Prince of Wales Hospital

The Prince of Wales Hospital was officially opened in 1982. It provides about 1,400 hospital beds and 24 hours Accident & Emergency service to the eastern New Territories. Other institutions which provide hospital services include the Sha Tin Hospital, the Cheshire Home and the Union Hospital.

== Other facilities ==
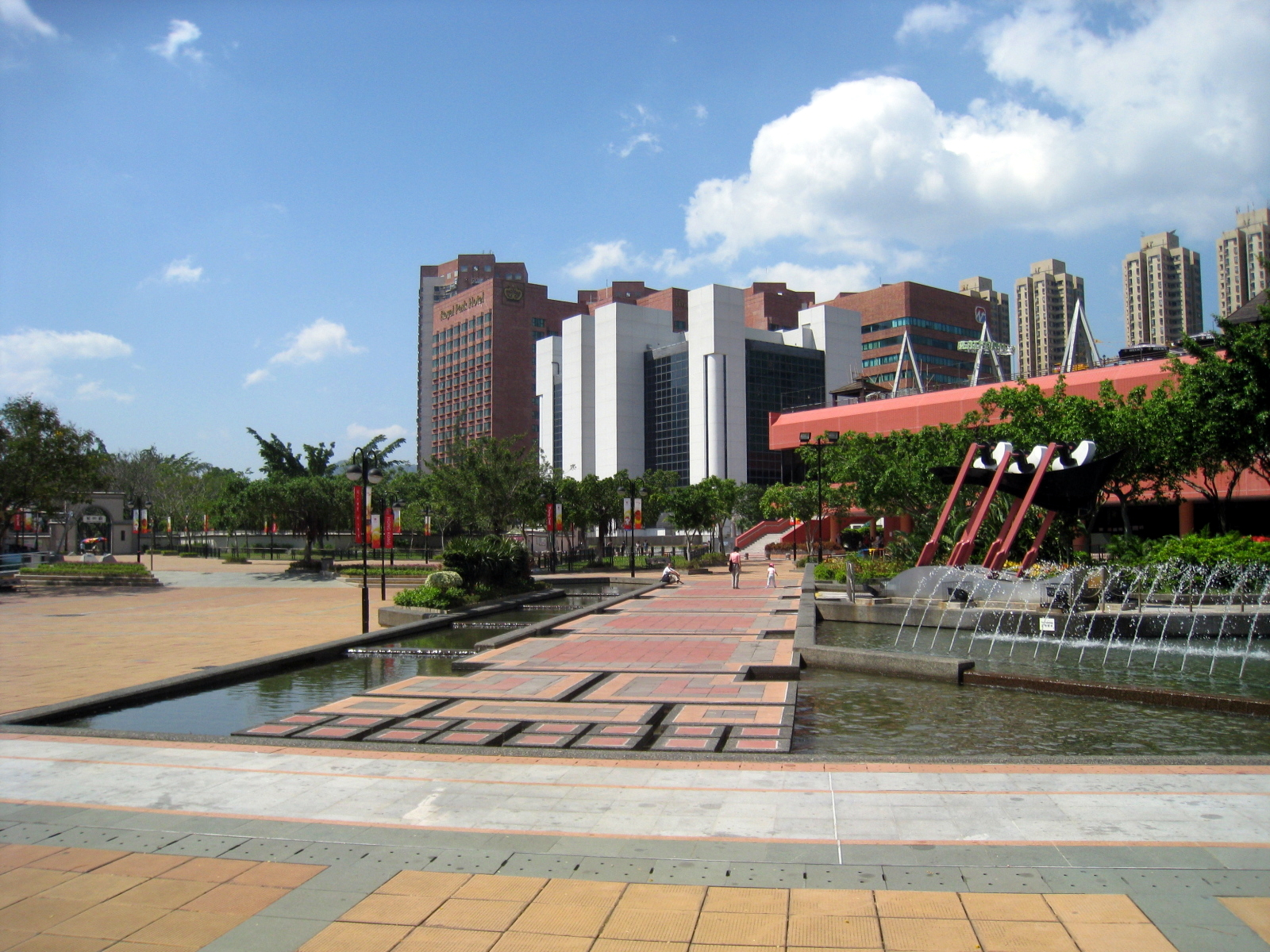
Sha Tin Park's main plaza.

- Sha Tin Town Hall (沙田大會堂)
- Sha Tin Public Library (沙田公共圖書館)
- Hong Kong Heritage Museum (香港文化博物館)
- Sha Tin Marriage Registry (沙田婚姻註冊處)
- Sha Tin Park (沙田公園)
- Royal Park Hotel (帝都酒店)
- Sha Tin Sports Ground
- Star Seafood Floating Restaurant

== Education ==
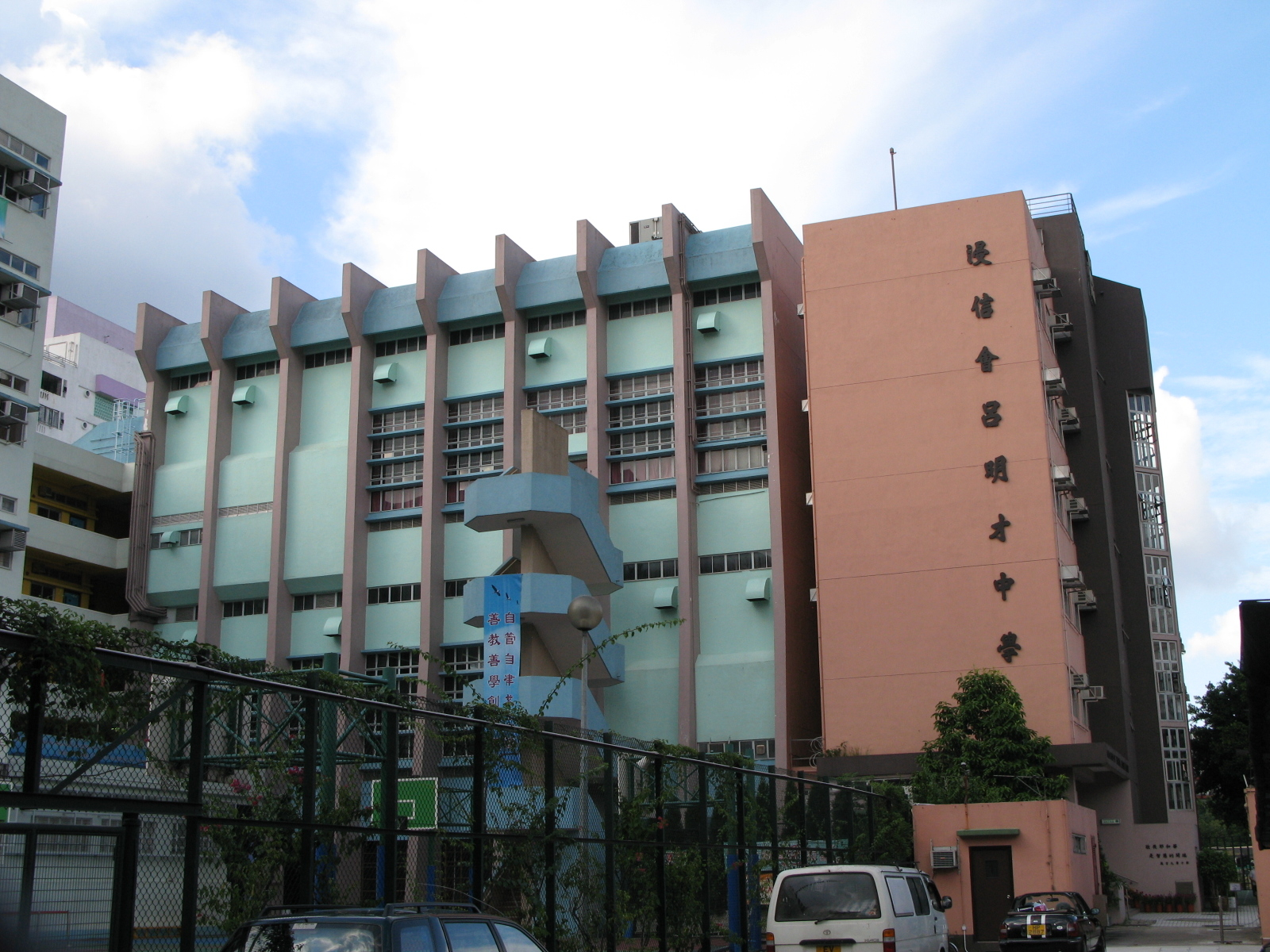
Baptist Lui Ming Choi Secondary School, one of the oldest secondary schools in Sha Tin

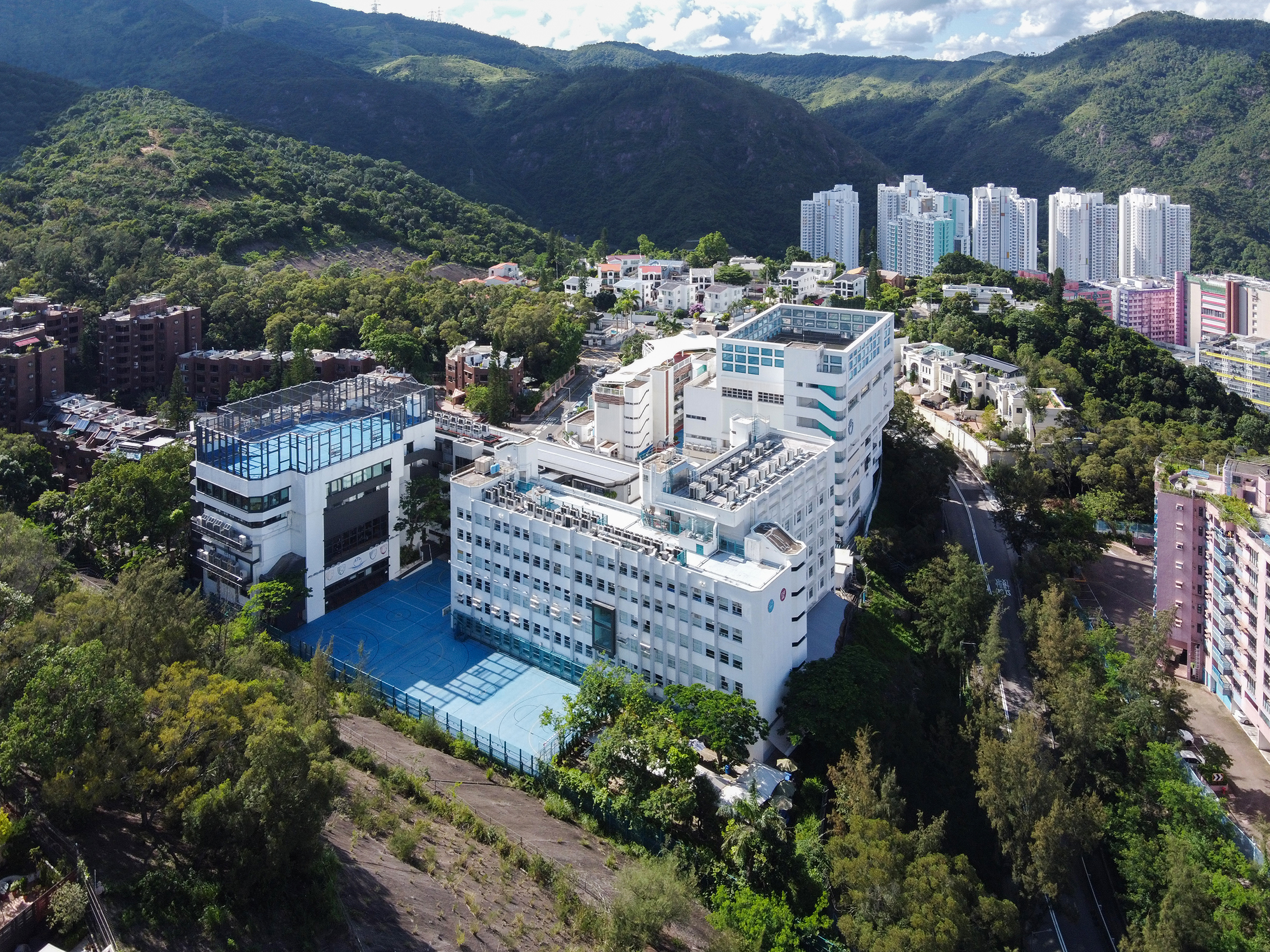
Sha Tin College, a member of the English Schools Foundation.

=== Tertiary institutions ===
- The Chinese University of Hong Kong (香港中文大學)
- Hang Seng University of Hong Kong (香港恒生大學)
- Hong Kong Baptist University (Shek Mun Campus)
- Hong Kong Institute of Vocational Education – Sha Tin (IVE-ST) (香港專業教育學院 沙田分校)
- Hong Kong Sports Institute (香港體育學院)

=== Primary and secondary schools ===
As of 2008, there were 46 primary and 44 secondary schools in Sha Tin and Ma On Shan.

Shatin Town Centre is in Primary One Admission (POA) School Net 91. Within the school net are multiple aided schools (operated independently but funded with government money); no government schools are in this net.

Primary and secondary schools

- Baptist Lui Ming Choi Secondary School (浸信會呂明才中學)
- Buddhist Wong Wan Tin College (佛教黃允畋中學)
- Carmel Alison Lam Primary School (迦密愛禮信小學)
- Christ College (基督書院)
- Hong Kong and Kowloon CCPA Ma Chung Sum Secondary School (港九潮州公會馬松深中學)
- Hong Kong Baptist University Affiliated School Wong Kam Fai Secondary And Primary School (香港浸會大學附屬學校王錦輝中小學)
- Jockey Club Ti-I College
- Kiangsu-Chekiang College (Shatin)
- Lam Tai Fai College
- Lok Sin Tong Young ko hsiao Lin Secondary School
- Ng Yuk Secondary School
- Pentecostal Lam Hon Kwong School
- Pui Ying College
- Sha Tin College
- Sha Tin Junior School
- Sha Tin Government Secondary School
- Sha Tin Methodist College
- Shatin Tsung Tsin Secondary School
- St. Rose of Lima's College
- Stewards Pooi Kei College
- Sheng Kung Hui Tsang Shiu Tim Secondary School

Other educational institutions

- Lutheran Theological Seminary

=== Public libraries ===
Hong Kong Public Libraries operates Sha Tin Public Library, the Yuen Chau Kok Public Library in the Yuen Chau Kok Complex, and the Lek Yuen Public Library in Lek Yuen Estate.

== Culture, sports and recreational facilities ==
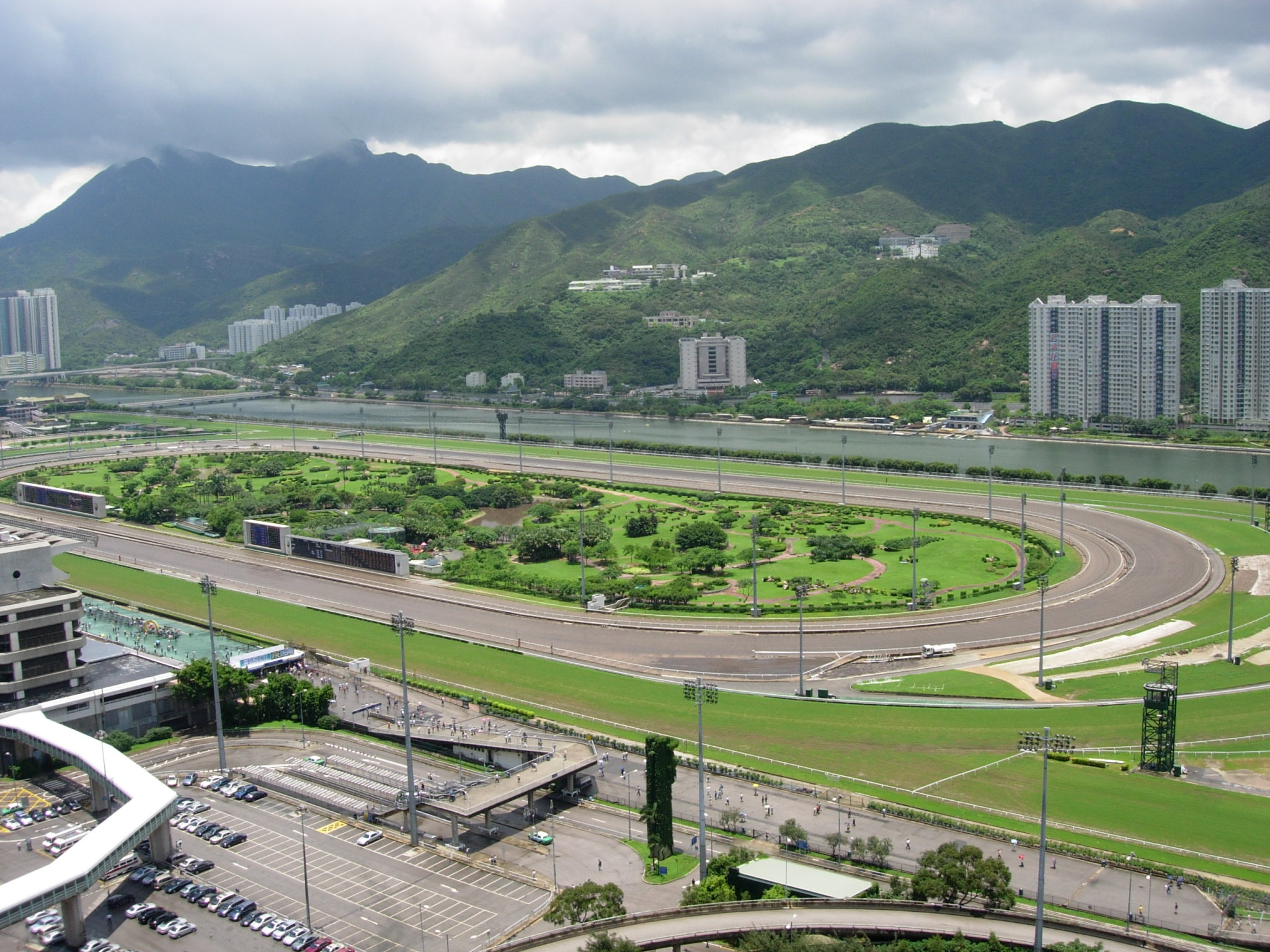
Sha Tin racecourse.

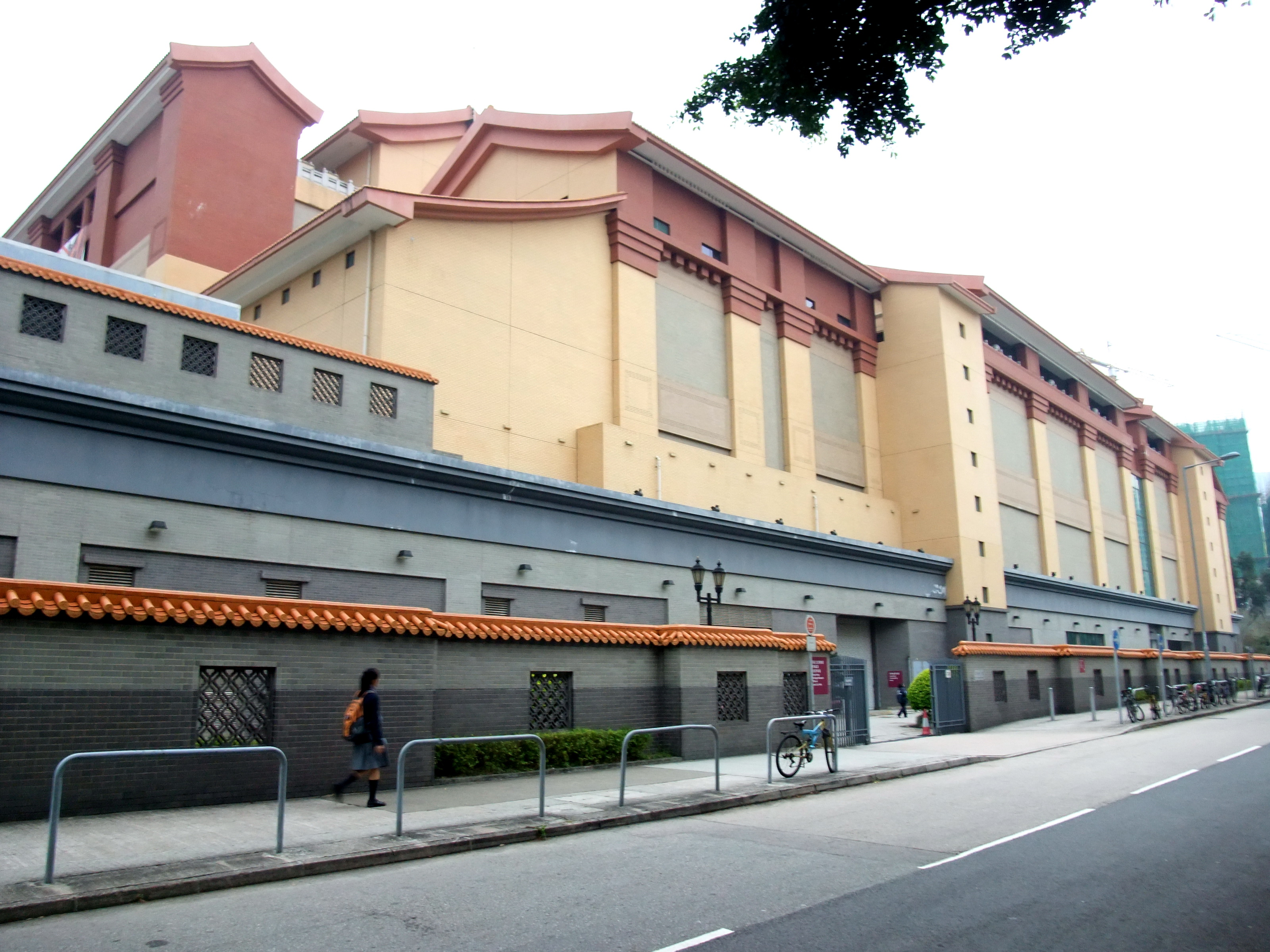
Hong Kong Heritage Museum.

There are numerous cultural, recreational and sport facilities in Sha Tin including the Town Hall, swimming pools, football pitches, indoor recreation centres and various track and field facilities for the use of Sha Tin residents.

The 8-hectare Sha Tin Park was opened to public in 1988. Apart from its horticultural gardens and impressive water features, it also includes a large open plaza and a bandstand. The Ma On Shan Park, which is adjacent to Ma On Shan Swimming Pool, occupies 5.5 hectare of land.

The Sha Tin Racecourse, occupying approximately 70 hectares, rests on reclaimed flatland. At the centre of the racecourse is the Penfold Garden which opens to the public on non-racing days.

Located in Tai Wai, the Hong Kong Heritage Museum was opened at the end of 2000. Apart from introducing the art, culture and history of the New Territories, the museum also exhibits a variety of cultural artifacts for public appreciation. It has pop culture exhibitions about Bruce Lee, Cantonese Opera, Jin Yong, development of Hong Kong popular music, film, and television and radio programmes. The museum, which can accommodate 6,000 visitors, is the largest in the territory.

Cycling has been a distinctive feature in Sha Tin and is very popular among both local people and visitors. The first cycle track in Sha Tin was opened to public in 1981, running along Tolo Highway to Tai Po, and this remains the territory's most popular cycling venue, drawing many occasional riders at the weekends, as well as dedicated cyclists. To tie in with the development of Ma On Shan, the cycle track was extended to Ma On Shan.

Hiking is also a popular activity around Sha Tin. There are several starting points including Hin Tin Village, Sha Tin Tau Village and Hung Mui Kuk Barbecue Area leading to the track of Lion Rock Mountain hiking route. It takes 1 hour to 4 hours to complete the track depending on the chosen starting point and ending point.

A Dragon Boat Racing competition is taking annually on Shing Mun River since 1984, at the time of the Dragon Boat Festival.

== Local delicacies ==
Sha Tin is famous for certain local variants of Cantonese food such as ShanSui Tofu (山水豆腐; 'mountain-water beancurd'), barbecued pigeon and chicken congee. The cooked food stalls in Wo Che Estate and Fo Tan are hotspots for food.

== Transportation ==
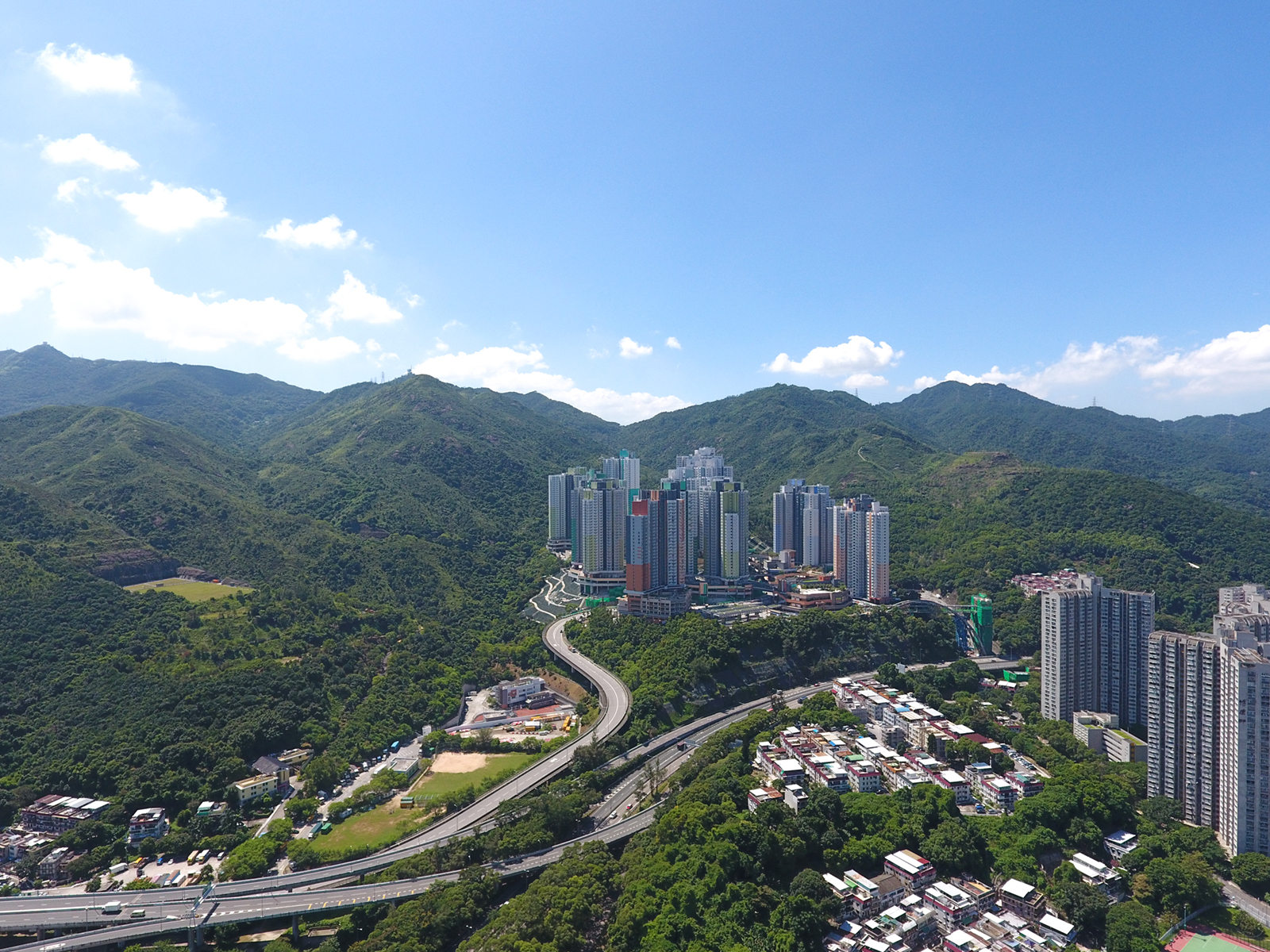
Roads leading to the Shui Chuen O outskirts.

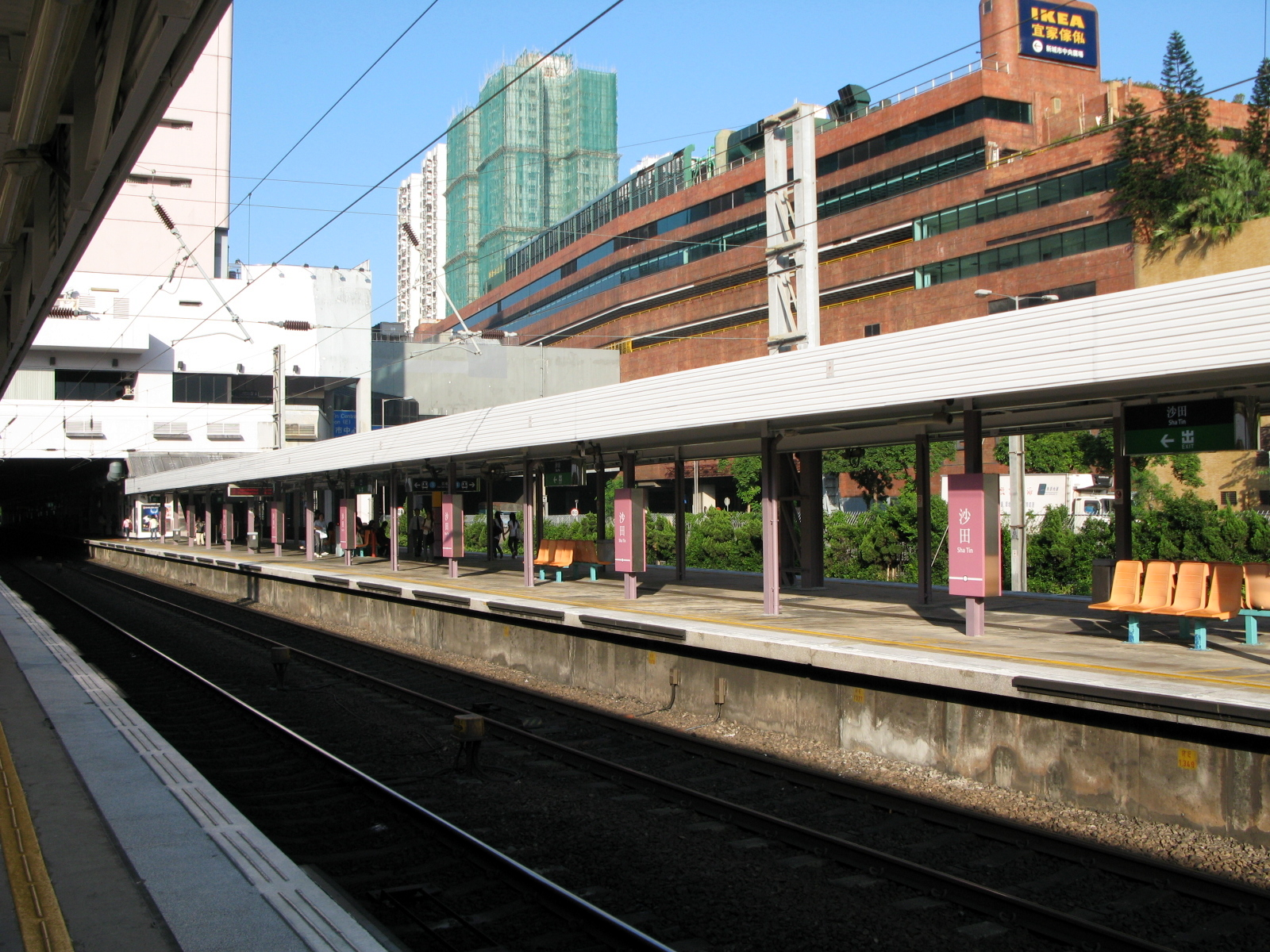
Sha Tin station

There are numerous transportation links both within the Sha Tin District and connecting it to other places in Hong Kong.

=== Roads ===
The road network in Sha Tin is well developed to provide efficient cross-town and local access traffic. Connection between Sha Tin and Kowloon mainly relies on the Lion Rock Tunnel, Tate's Cairn Tunnel, Shing Mun Tunnel and Tai Po Road which makes it easy to reach from many areas of Kowloon as well as from Tsuen Wan.

- Tai Po Road spans from Sham Shui Po in Kowloon to Tai Po in the New Territories, connecting Sha Tin en route. It was once the only road connecting Kowloon and the eastern part of the New Territories.
- Opened in the 1960s, the Lion Rock Tunnel offers access to Central Kowloon.
- The Tate's Cairn Highway was completed in 1991, connecting East Kowloon (Wong Tai Sin, Diamond Hill, Choi Hung, Kowloon Bay, and Kwun Tong) and Hong Kong Island via the Eastern Harbour Crossing with the North East New Territories (Sha Tin, Tai Po and Fanling) via the Tolo Highway and through Tate's Cairn Tunnel.
- Route connects Sha Tin to Tsuen Wan via the Shing Mun Tunnels and to Hong Kong Island via the Western Harbour Crossing. The travelling time is only about 30 minutes.
- Sai Sha Road was opened in 1988, connecting Sha Tin to Sai Kung via Ma On Shan. Route T7, opened in August 2004, allows traffic to bypass Ma On Shan Town Centre when going from north of Ma On Shan to Sai Kung.
- An expressway (via Eagle's Nest Tunnel) connecting Cheung Sha Wan in Kowloon to Sha Tin was opened on 21 March 2008. It aims at distributing traffic from Sha Tin and the area to its north, to Lai Chi Kok, Kwai Chung, and the airport at Chek Lap Kok and Mong Kok. It has shortened the trip from Sha Tin to the Chek Lap Kok International Airport to around 40 minutes.

At present, there are over 110 routes of public bus serving Sha Tin.

=== Railway ===
- The MTR (East Rail line) is a major means of transportation between Admiralty and Lo Wu via Sha Tin. After the electrification of the line between 1979 and 1983, the East Rail now carries over 730,000 passengers daily.
- The Tuen Ma line opened on 21 December 2004. The 56.4 km long railway has 27 stations linking West Rail line at Hung Hom via Kai Tak. The MTR Maintenance Centre is located in Tai Wai.

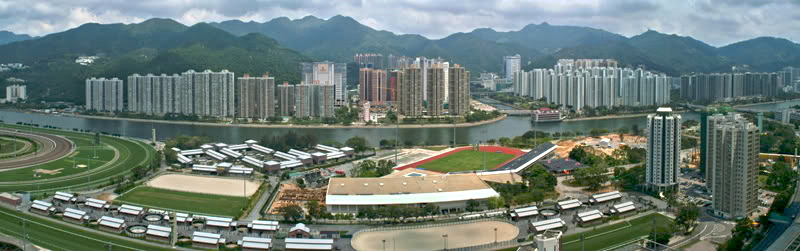
Shatin's cityscape viewed from northern Fo Tan

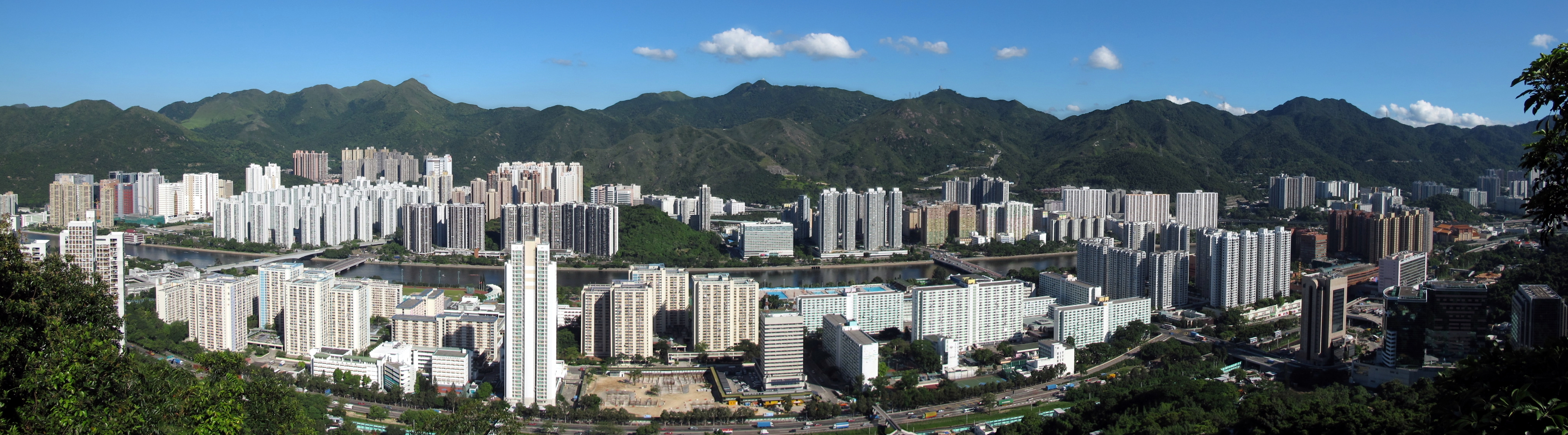
A panorama of Sha Tin City taken from Sha Tin Lion Pavilion

== Climate ==
Climate data for Sha Tin (1991–2020)
Month	Jan	Feb	Mar	Apr	May	Jun	Jul	Aug	Sep	Oct	Nov	Dec	Year
Record high °C (°F)	27.6 (81.7)	28.6 (83.5)	31.8 (89.2)	33.0 (91.4)	36.6 (97.9)	36.4 (97.5)	37.5 (99.5)	38.1 (100.6)	36.5 (97.7)	35.1 (95.2)	31.8 (89.2)	28.9 (84.0)	38.1 (100.6)
Mean daily maximum °C (°F)	19.2 (66.6)	19.9 (67.8)	22.1 (71.8)	25.8 (78.4)	29.1 (84.4)	30.8 (87.4)	31.9 (89.4)	31.9 (89.4)	31.0 (87.8)	28.5 (83.3)	25.0 (77.0)	20.9 (69.6)	26.3 (79.4)
Daily mean °C (°F)	15.7 (60.3)	16.6 (61.9)	19.1 (66.4)	22.7 (72.9)	26.1 (79.0)	28.0 (82.4)	28.8 (83.8)	28.6 (83.5)	27.7 (81.9)	25.2 (77.4)	21.6 (70.9)	17.4 (63.3)	23.1 (73.6)
Mean daily minimum °C (°F)	12.8 (55.0)	14.0 (57.2)	16.6 (61.9)	20.3 (68.5)	23.8 (74.8)	25.8 (78.4)	26.3 (79.3)	26.0 (78.8)	25.1 (77.2)	22.6 (72.7)	18.7 (65.7)	14.3 (57.7)	20.5 (68.9)
Record low °C (°F)	2.9 (37.2)	4.0 (39.2)	4.4 (39.9)	10.2 (50.4)	15.3 (59.5)	19.9 (67.8)	21.3 (70.3)	22.1 (71.8)	18.4 (65.1)	14.4 (57.9)	6.3 (43.3)	4.8 (40.6)	2.9 (37.2)
Average precipitation mm (inches)	35.0 (1.38)	35.1 (1.38)	67.1 (2.64)	145.0 (5.71)	324.3 (12.77)	536.6 (21.13)	419.9 (16.53)	431.1 (16.97)	291.5 (11.48)	110.3 (4.34)	40.6 (1.60)	33.9 (1.33)	2,470.4 (97.26)
Average relative humidity (%)	73.1	77.3	80.1	81.0	81.4	81.9	80.2	80.4	77.1	71.8	71.4	68.7	77.0
Source: Hong Kong Observatory

== See also ==
- Sha Tin Airfield
- Wo Che
- Siu Lek Yuen
- Yuen Chau Kok
- Lek Yuen Bridge
