= Sha Tin Wai =

Area in Hong Kong

Coordinates: 22.377867°N 114.197559°E

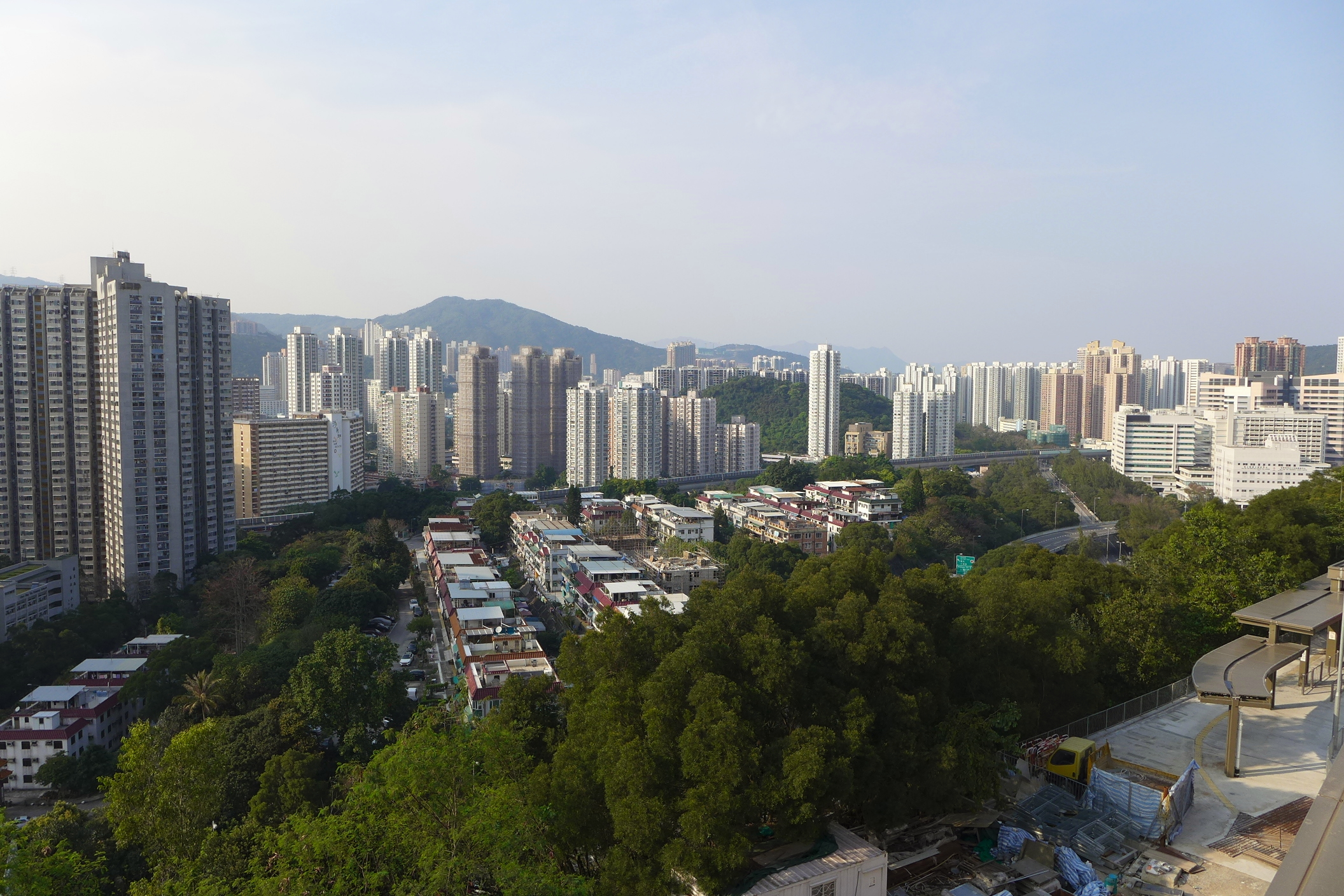
View of the Sha Tin Wai area. The village houses on the picture are part of the following villages (from left to right): Tse Uk Village (謝屋村), Fui Yiu Ha New Village (灰窰下新村), Sha Tin Wai New Village (沙田圍新村).

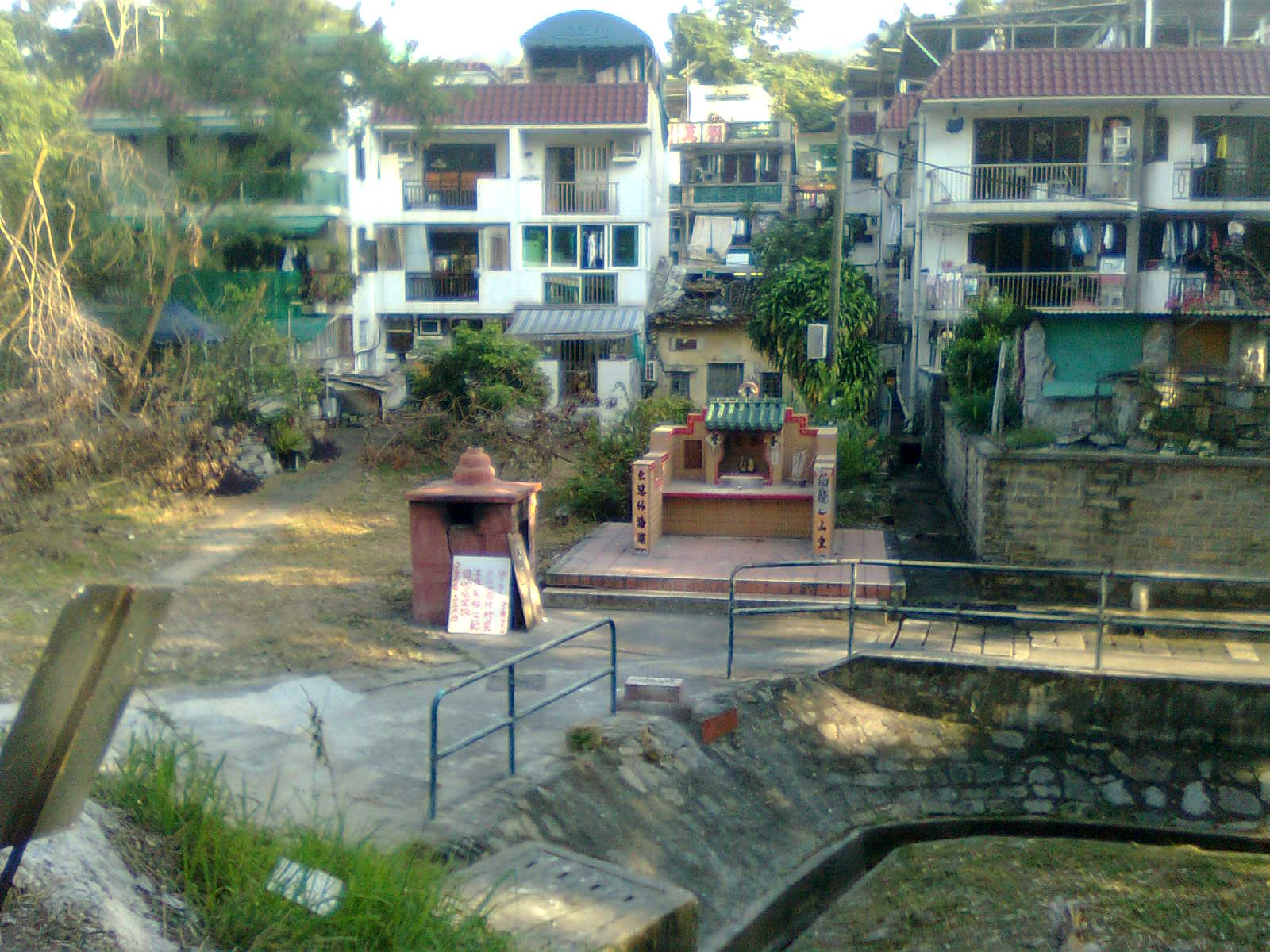
Sha Tin Wai village.

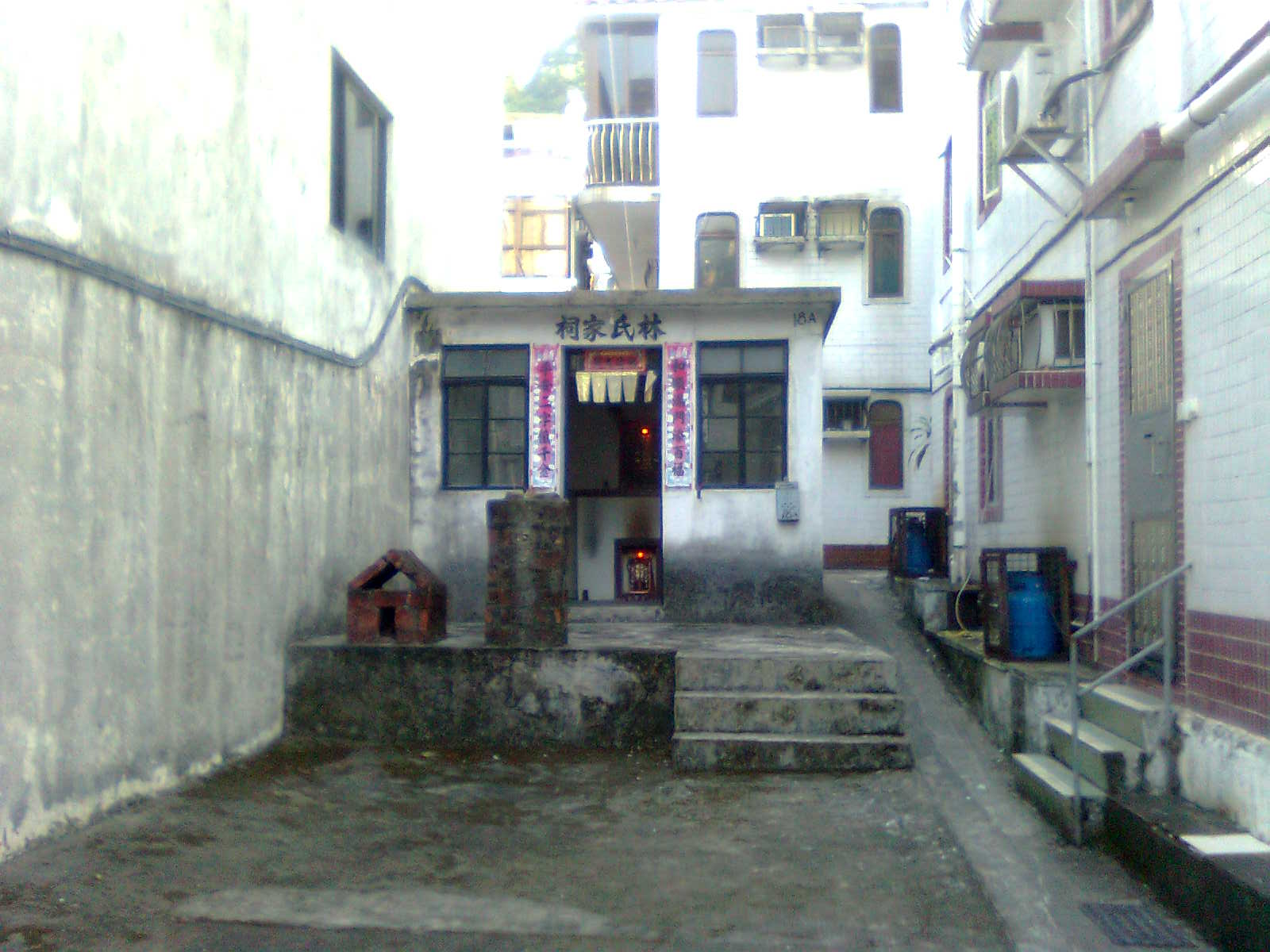
Lam ancestral hall in Sha Tin Wai village.

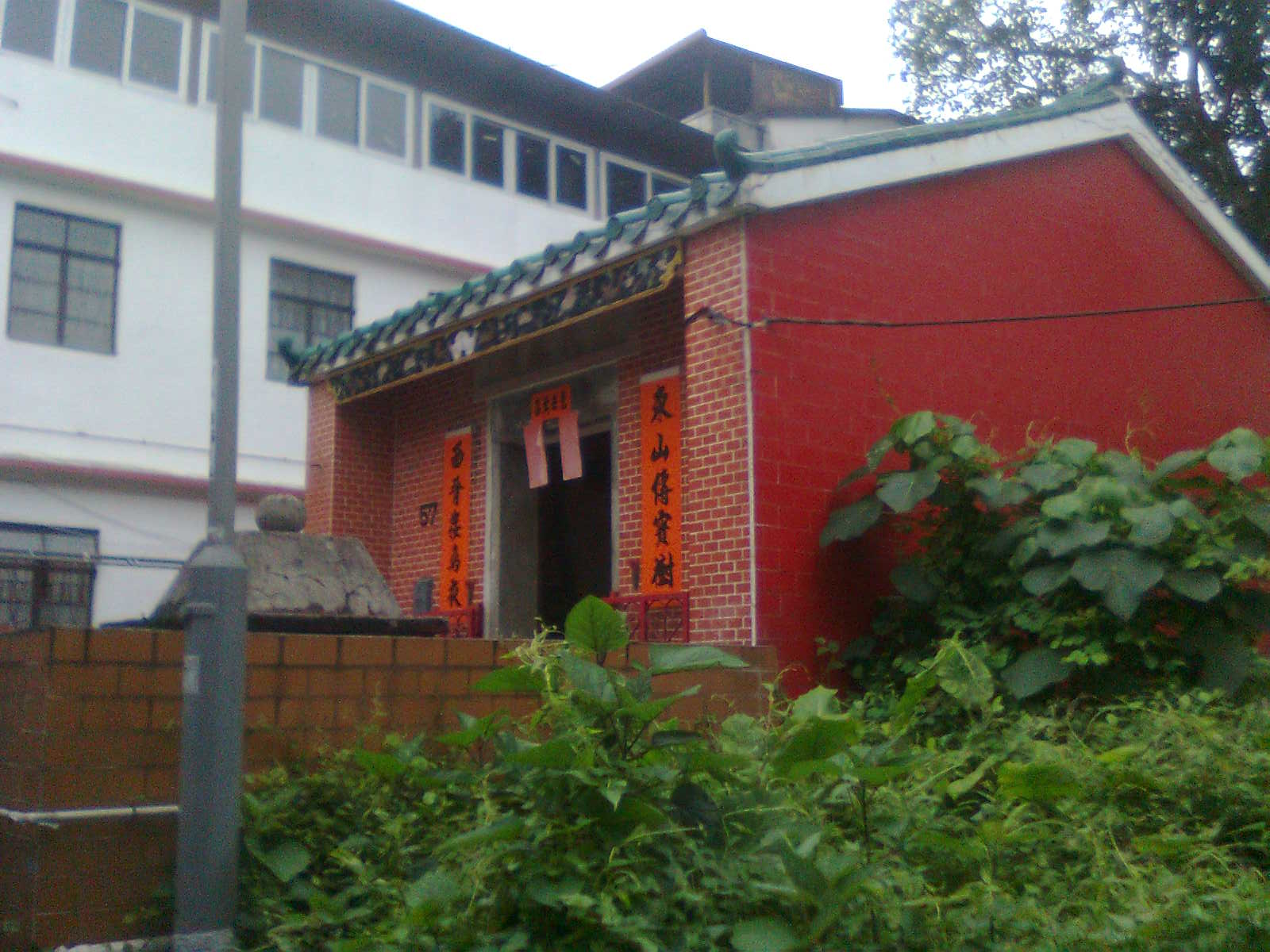
Tse ancestral hall in Sha Tin Wai village.

Sha Tin Wai (Chinese: 沙田圍) is an area in Sha Tin District, New Territories, Hong Kong, named after Sha Tin Wai Village (沙田圍村).

== Name ==
The name of the Sha Tin area allegedly comes from the fact that British colonial officials mistook the name of Sha Tin Wai village as the name of the area.

== Administration ==
Sha Tin Wai Village and Sha Tin Wai New Village (沙田圍新村) aka. Sha Tin Wai Resite Area, are recognized villages under the New Territories Small House Policy.

== History ==
The village was established by the Tse (謝), Cheng (鄭) and Lam (林) clans from Pok Law (Boluo County) in the mid-17th century. Each of the clans has their own ancestral hall. One of the branch of Tse relocated to nearby Yuen Chau Kok to establish their own village.

The village was originally built on the Sha Tin Sea waterfront. As a consequence of successive land reclamation of the former estuary that started in 1905, it is now separated from the Shing Mun River by Sha Kok Estate. The Estate was built in Sha Tin New Town-era. Houses of the traditional villages were then built in front of the initial row of houses, and as a consequence, half of today's Sha Tin Wai is built on reclaimed land.

At the time of the 1911 census, the population of Sha Tin Wai village was 180. The number of males was 81.

Sha Tin Wai village, its surrounding area, as well as area around Sha Tin station in the opposite shore of Sha Tin Sea, were studied by HKU student in 1963 as a possible site of building Hong Kong's satellite town. Those area were indeed selected by the government to become part of Sha Tin New Town project, which included land reclamation of Sha Tin Sea. The modern day Shing Mun River was the residual of the Sha Tin Sea.

== See also ==
- Sand Martin Bridge
- Sha Tin Wai Road
- Sha Tin Wai station
