= Lek Yuen Bridge =

Bridge in Hong Kong

Lek Yuen Bridge 瀝源橋
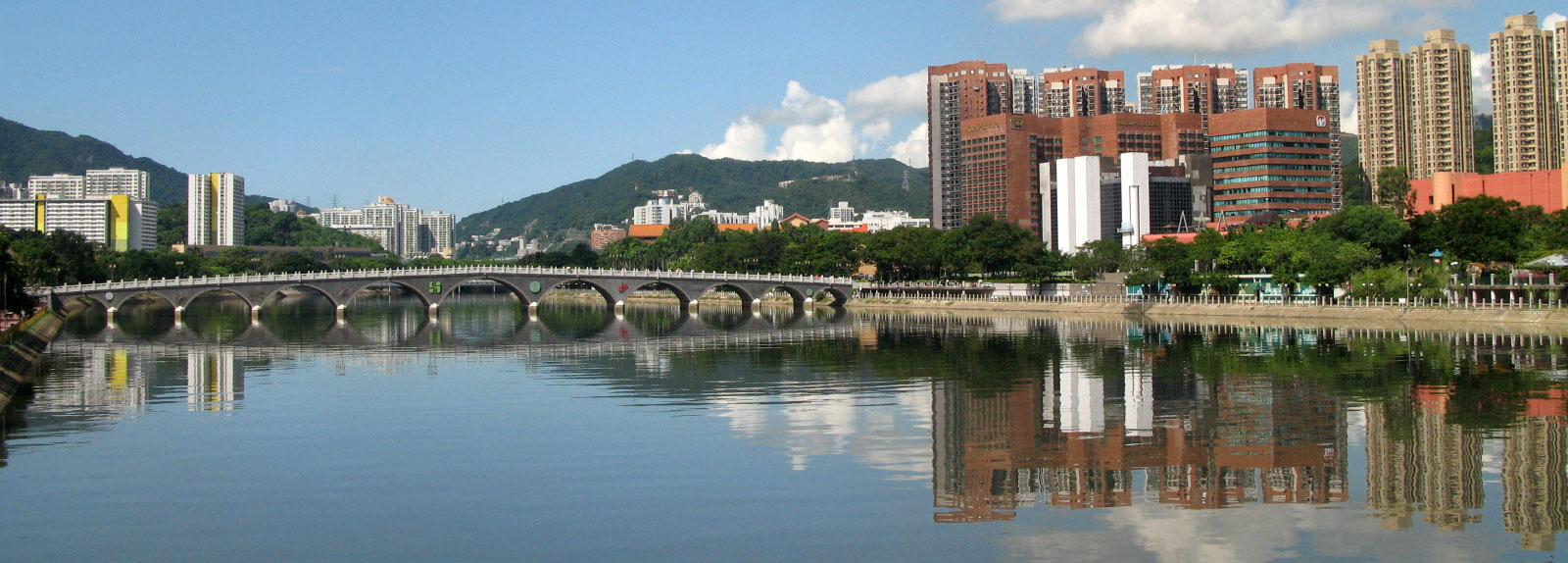
- Lek Yuen Bridge across Shing Mun River
- Coordinates: 22°22′45″N 114°11′28″E
- Crosses: Shing Mun River
- Locale: Sha Tin, New Territories, Hong Kong
- Named for: Lek Yuen (may refer to archaic name for Sha Tin or the nearby Lek Yuen Estate)
- Preceded by: Lion Bridge
- Followed by: Sand Martin Bridge

Characteristics
- Material: Concrete
- Total length: 160 m

History
- Opened: 1988; 37 years ago

Location
- Interactive map of Lek Yuen Bridge

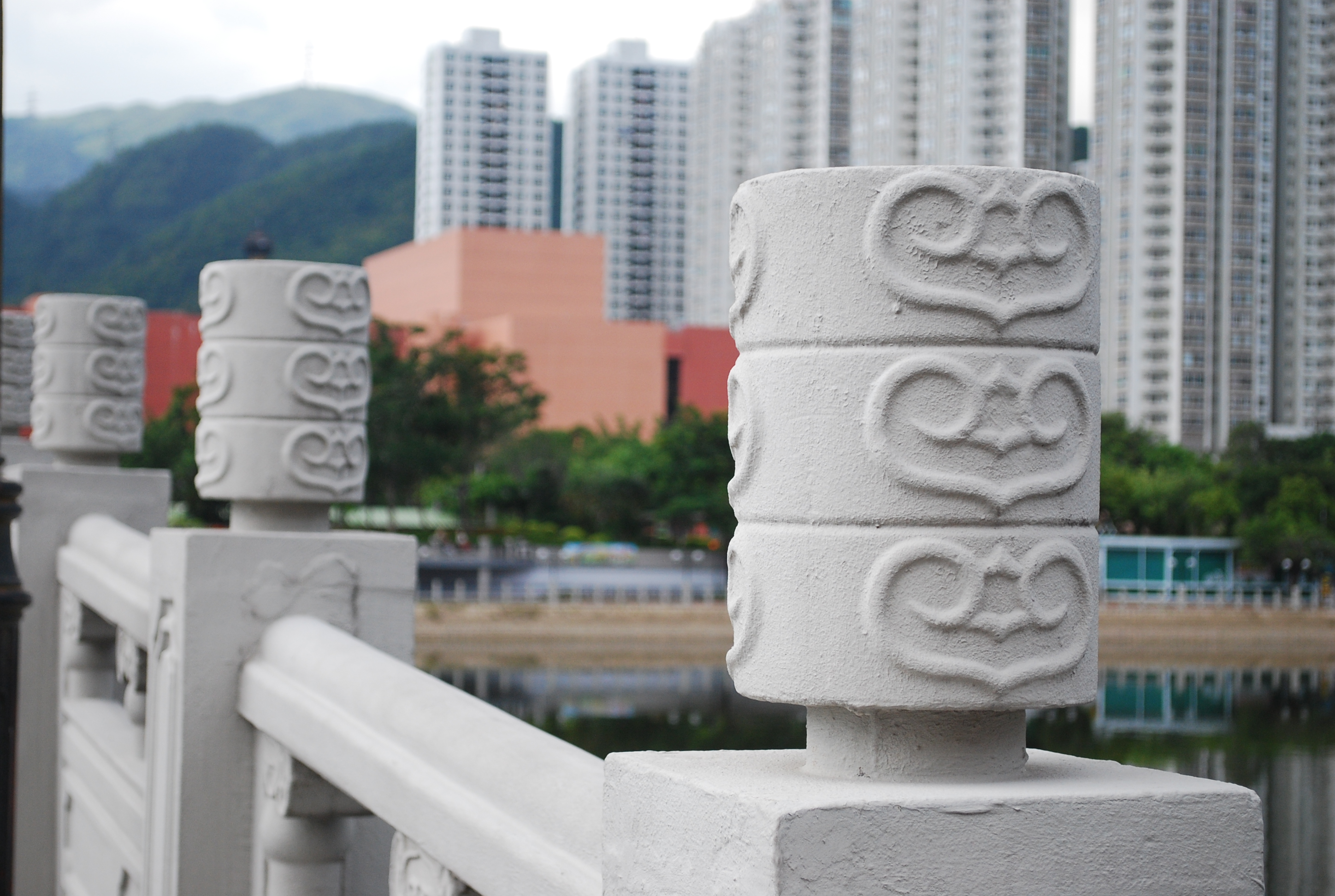
Ornamental fencing of Lek Yuen Bridge

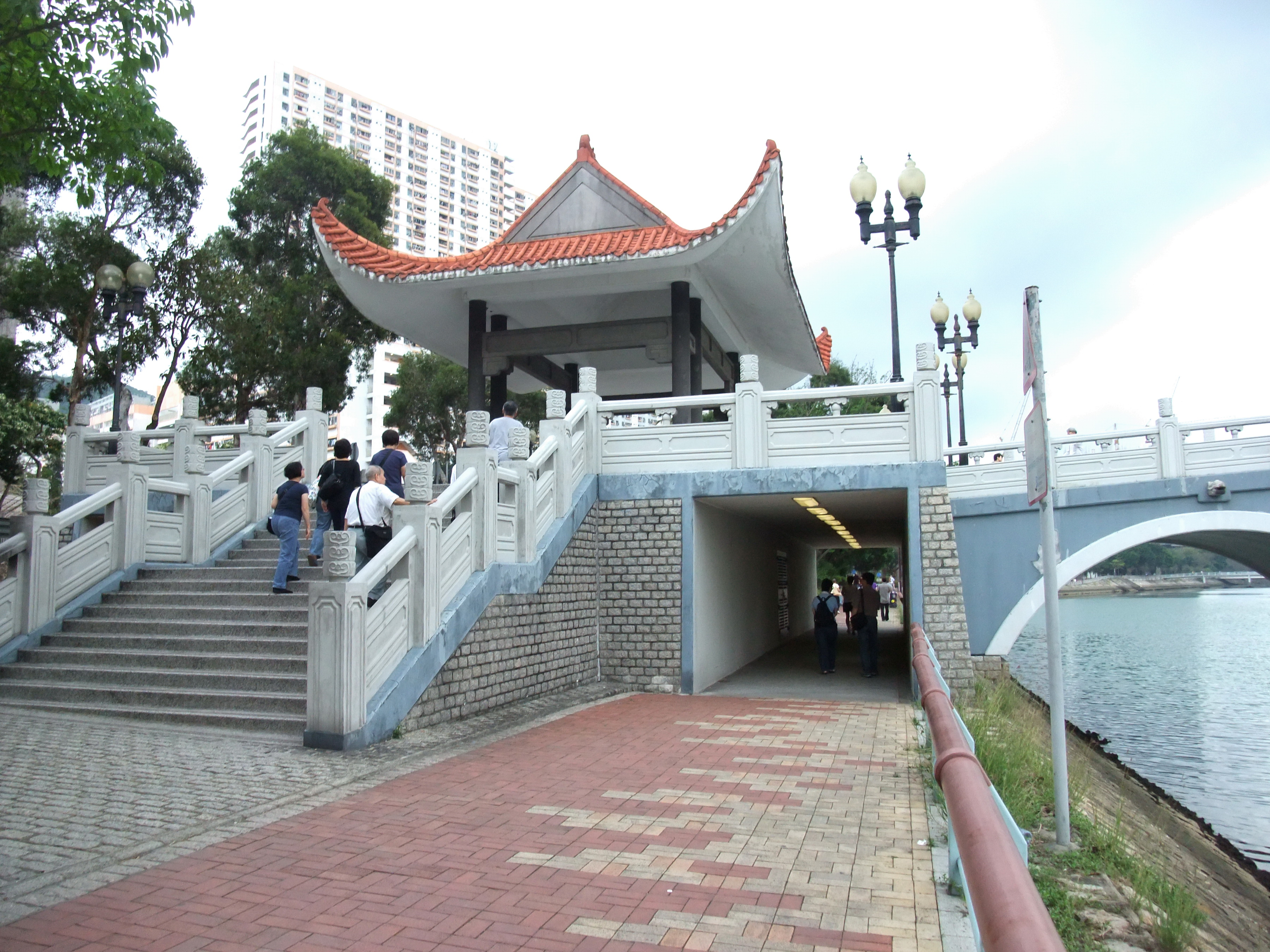
Pavilion at the southeastern end of Lek Yuen Bridge

Lek Yuen Bridge (Chinese: 瀝源橋) is a pedestrian footbridge in Sha Tin New Town, New Territories, Hong Kong, across the Shing Mun River.

The uncovered concrete footbridge was built in 1988. It is about 160 m in length with a structural area of about 1,000 m^{2}.
