= Yuen Chau Kok =

Area in Sha Tin District, Hong Kong

Coordinates: 22.383294°N 114.199319°E

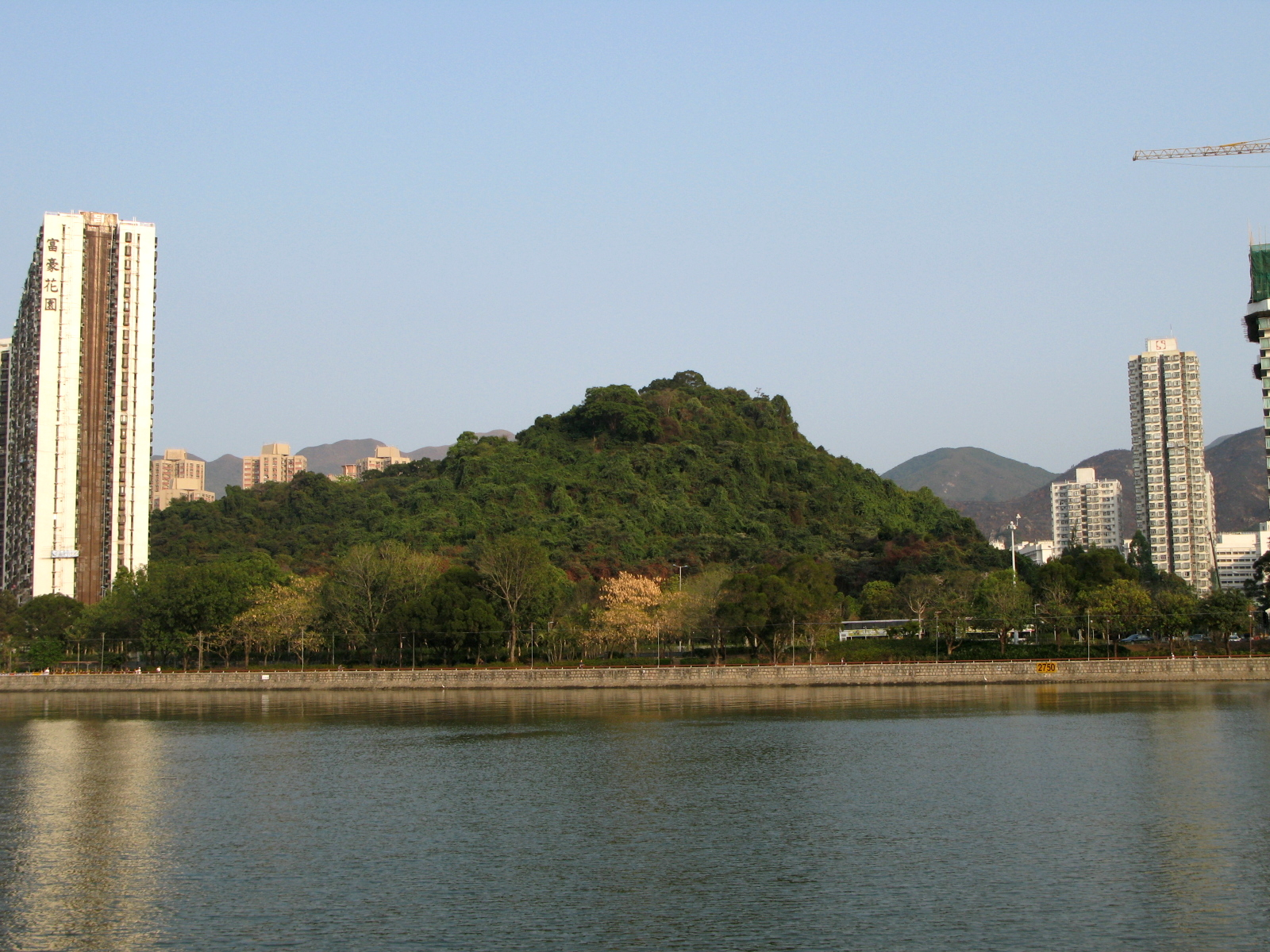
View of Yuen Chau Kok from Shing Mun River in March 2008

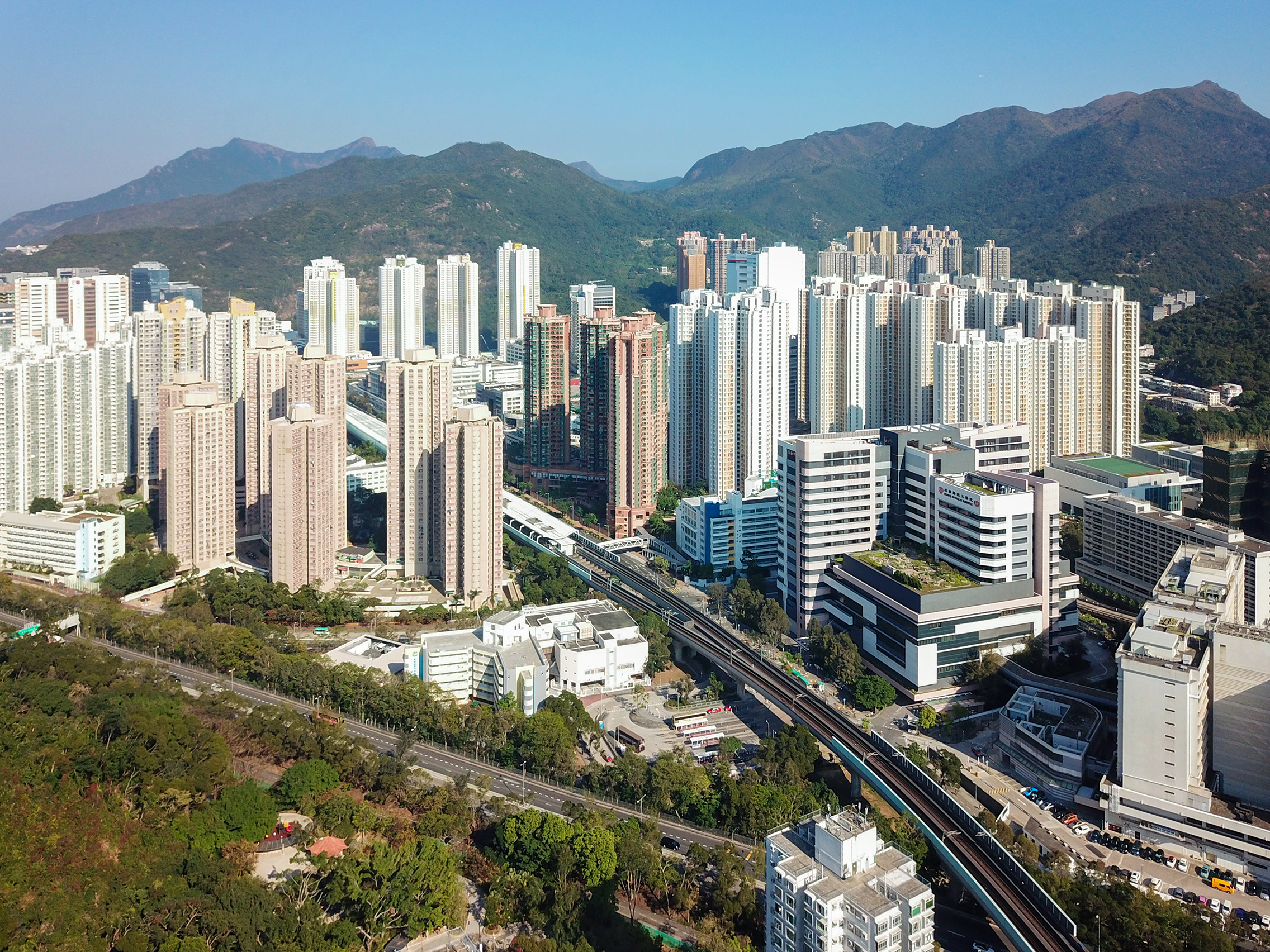
Buildings in Yuen Chau Kok in January 2019

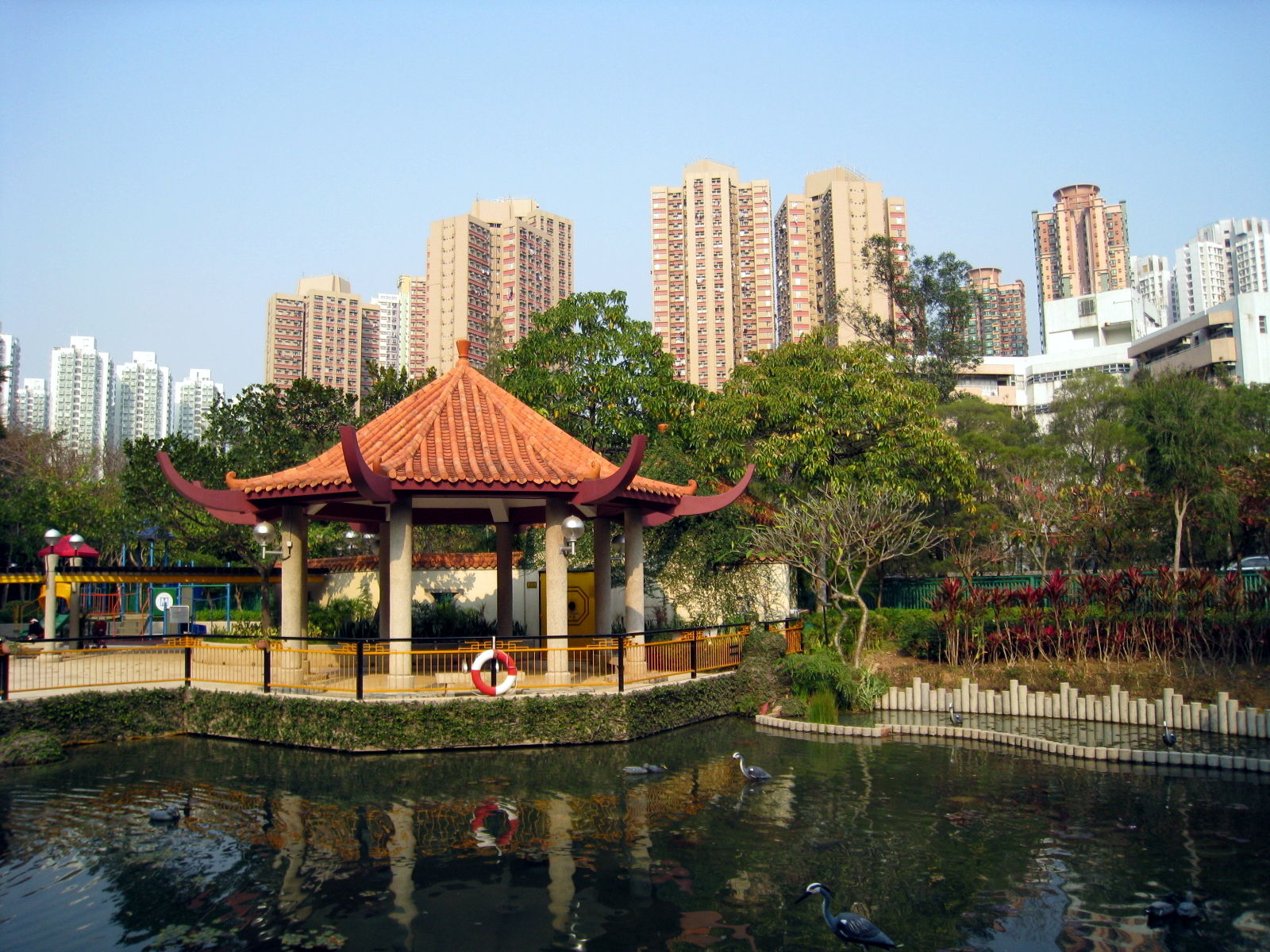
Yuen Chau Kok Park in March 2008

Yuen Chau Kok (Chinese: 圓洲角) is an area in Sha Tin District, New Territories, Hong Kong, near Sha Tin Road and Prince of Wales Hospital and is within walking distance of City One station of the MTR Tuen Ma line. Before reclamation work in the 1970s, the area was an island in Tide Cove.

The island was a major station for travellers and goods plying between Guangdong and Kowloon. Wong Uk Village (王屋村) was a trading station for merchants and travellers until the late 19th century. Most of the old buildings of the village were ruined or demolished due to the reclamation of Tide Cove for the development of the Sha Tin New Town. Currently the main part of the island is converted into a park.

One branch of Tse village of Sha Tin Wai, also relocated to Yuen Chau Kok and built their own village over there.

== Education ==
Yuen Chau Kok is in Primary One Admission (POA) School Net 91. Within the school net are multiple aided schools (operated independently but funded with government money); no government schools are in this net.

== Others ==
- Wong Uk Village
