= Tse Uk Village =

Coordinates: 22.375613°N 114.196409°E

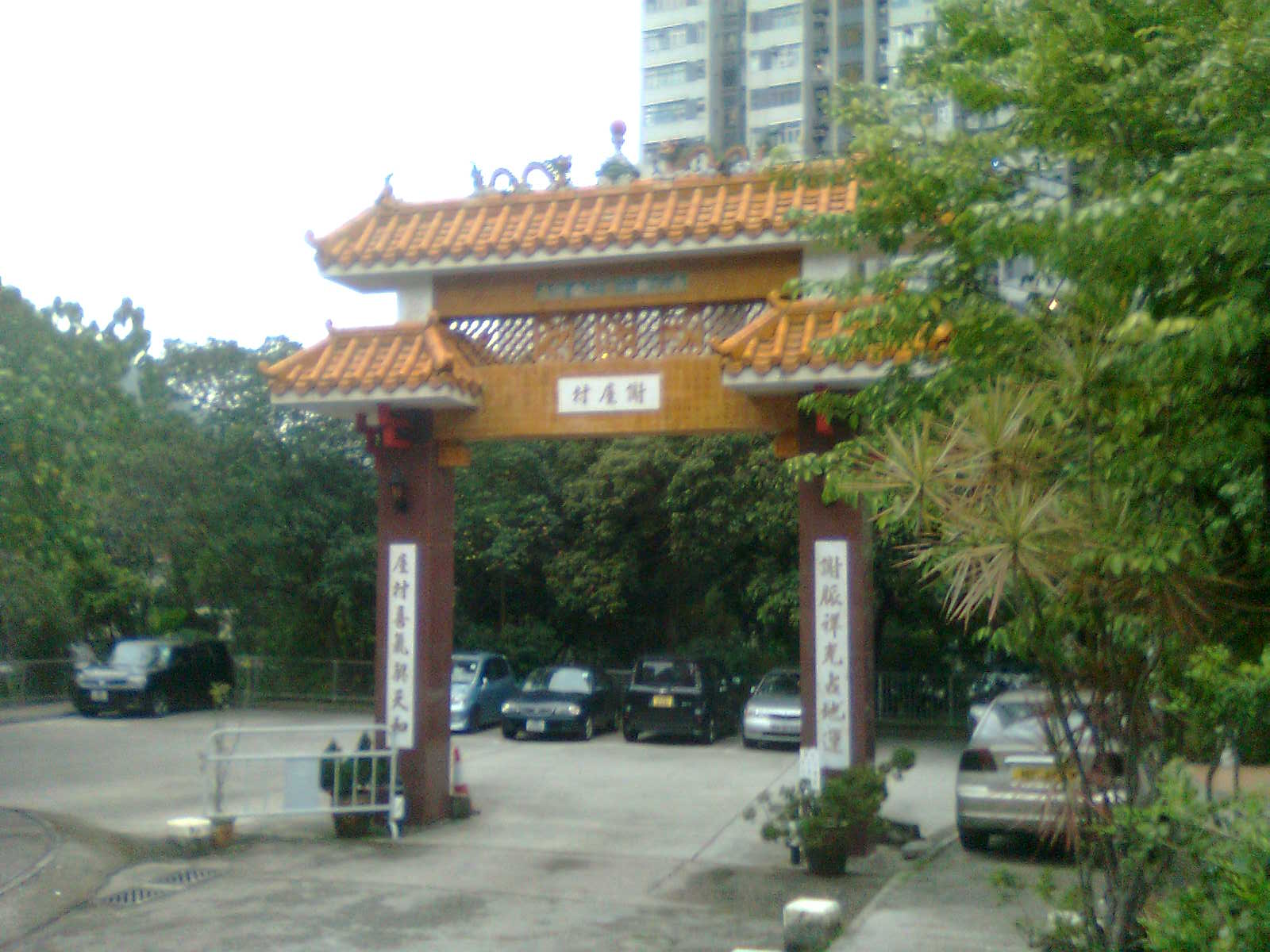
Tse Uk Village archway.

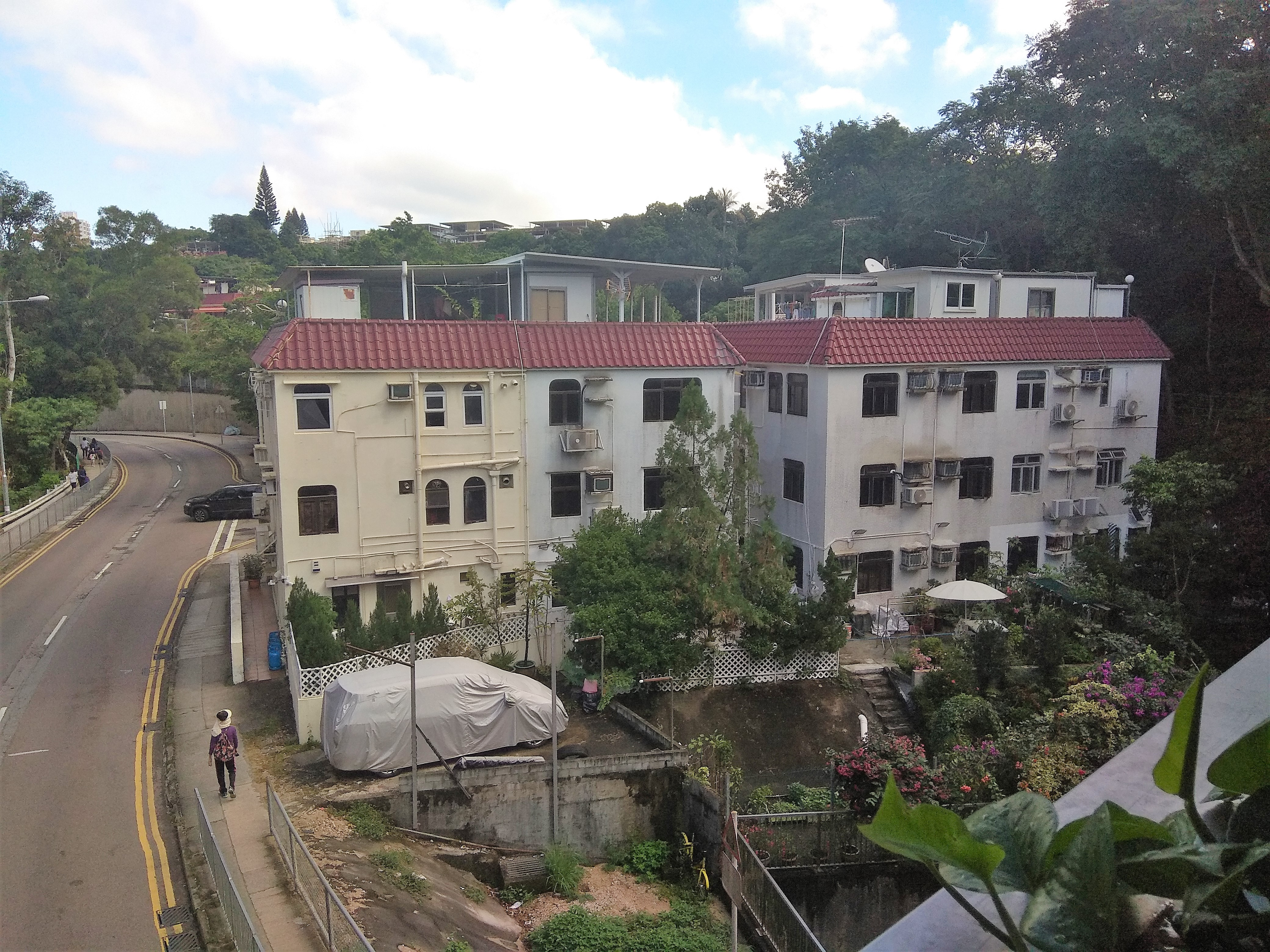
Tse Uk Village.

Tse Uk Village (Chinese: 謝屋村) is a village in the Sha Tin Wai area of Sha Tin District, Hong Kong.

== Administration ==
Tse Uk is a recognized village under the New Territories Small House Policy.
