= Shing Mun River =

River in Sha Tin, Hong Kong

Coordinates: 22.384781°N 114.196529°E

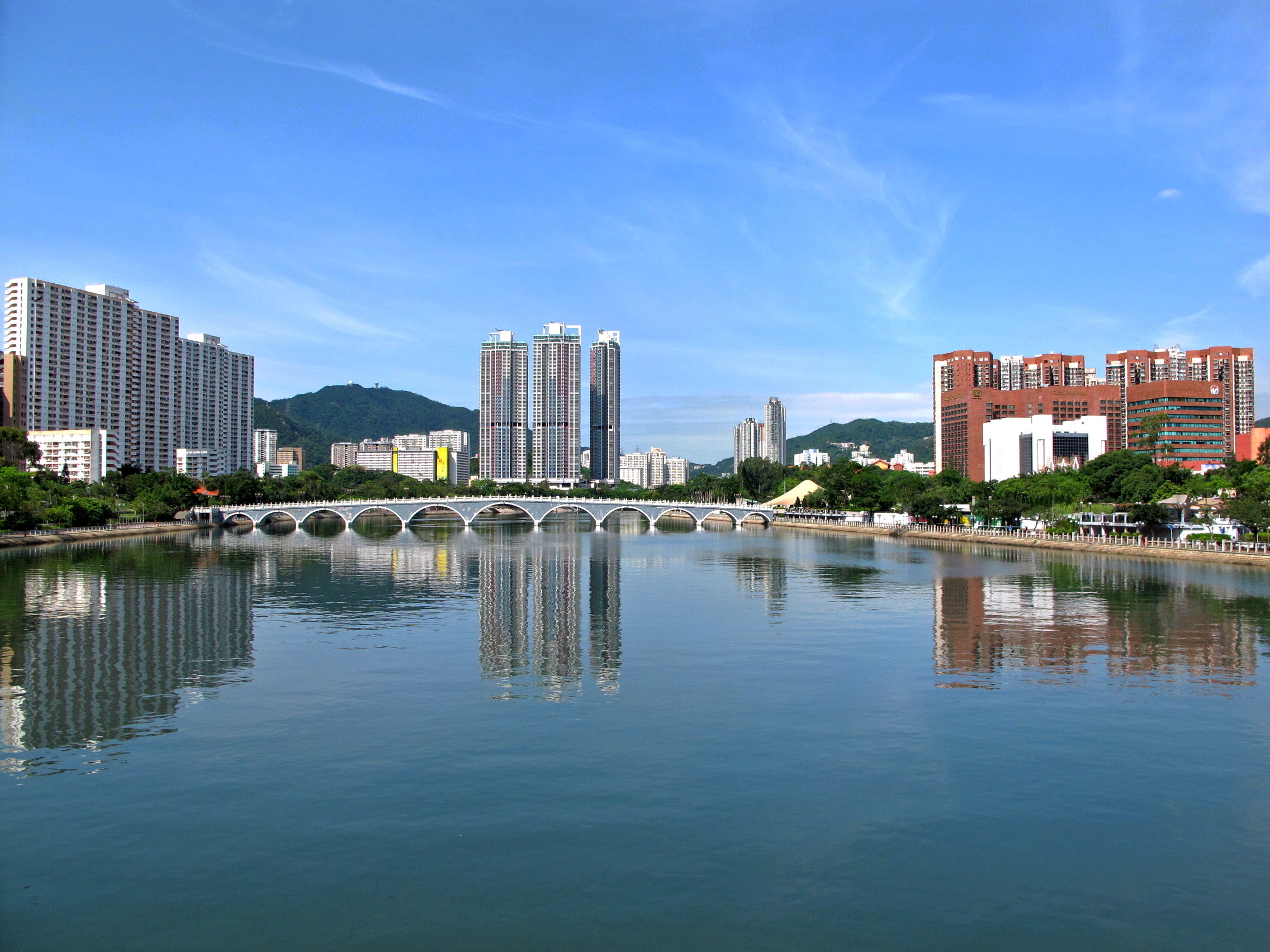
- Lek Yuen Bridge and housing estates along the river

Physical characteristics
- Mouth
  - location: Tide Cove
- Length: 7 km (4.3 mi)

Shing Mun River
- Traditional Chinese: 城門河
- Simplified Chinese: 城门河
Transcriptions
Standard Mandarin
- Hanyu Pinyin: Chéngmén Hé
Hakka
- Romanization: Sang4 mun2 ho2
Yue: Cantonese
- Jyutping: Sing4 mun4 ho4
- IPA: [ɕɪ̏ŋ mȕːn hɔ̏ː]

The Shing Mun River (Chinese: 城門河) or Shing Mun River Channel (城門河道) is a river in Sha Tin, Hong Kong.

== History ==
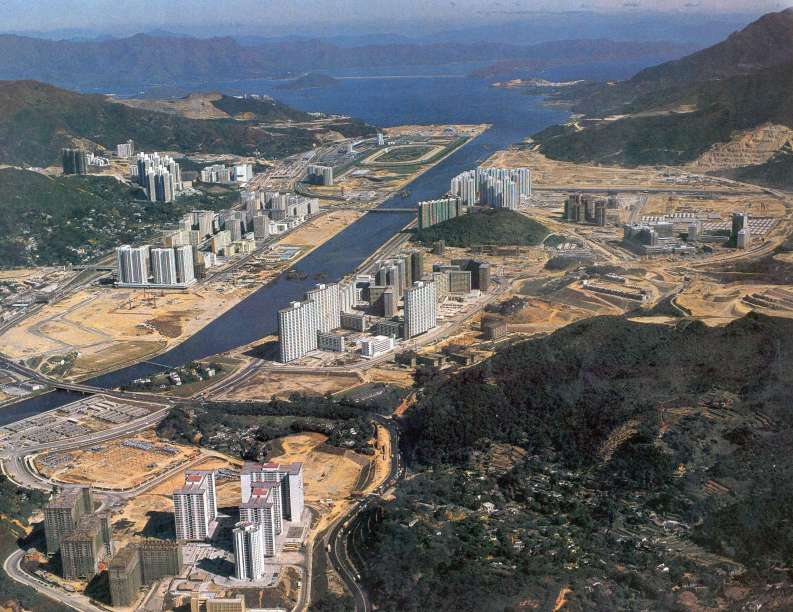
The Shing Mun River in 1981. The surrounding area is now well-developed with a high density of buildings.

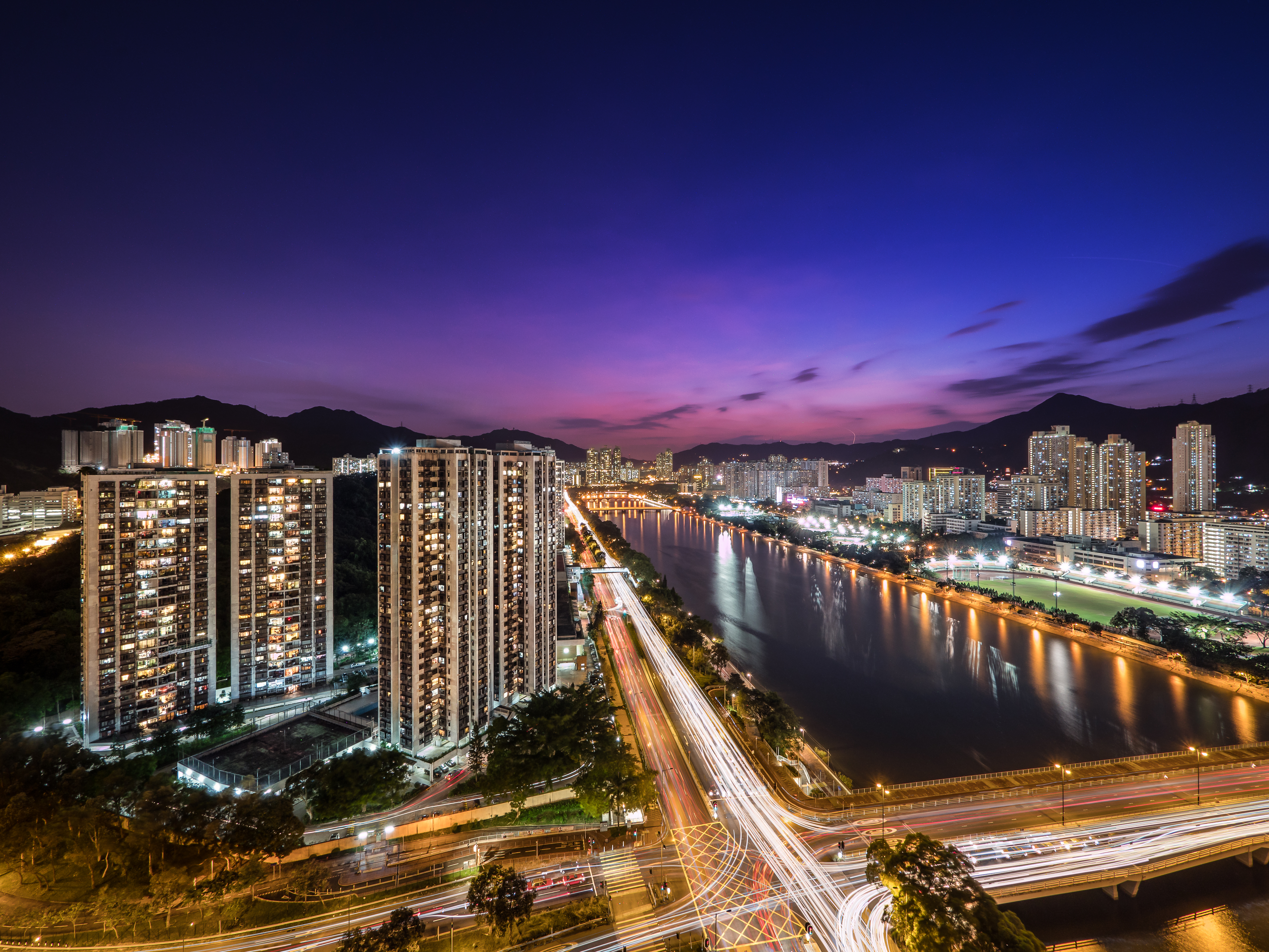
Industrial and residential buildings are located along the banks of Shing Mun River.

The original Shing Mun River began at Needle Hill, and flowed into the former Tide Cove (Sha Tin Hoi), a shallow bay. In the 1970s, Tide Cove was reclaimed and turned to Sha Tin New Town. The river was extended through a 7 km long, 200 m wide artificial channel in the middle of the area to flow into Tolo Harbour. Other rivers that had originally flowed into Tide Cove are now tributaries of Shing Mun River in the form of concreted nullahs.

The Shing Mun River channel runs from the Tai Wai area, through the Sha Tin town centre to the Tolo Harbour. It has three main tributaries, namely Tai Wai Nullah, Fo Tan Nullah and Siu Lek Yuen Nullah. Along the Shing Mun River are high-rise residential, commercial and industrial buildings with numerous village-type developments such as City One Shatin and Wo Che Estate scattered around. Several bridges were built to connect the two sides of the Shing Mun River.

== Bridges ==
There are several major bridges across the Shing Mun River:

- Banyan Bridge (翠榕橋) on Fo Tan Road
- Dragon Bridge (錦龍橋) on Sha Tin Road
- Lion Bridge (獅子橋) on Lion Rock Tunnel Road
- Sand Martin Bridge (沙燕橋) on Sha Tin Rural Committee Road
- Lek Yuen Bridge (瀝源橋) – a pedestrian bridge

== Current usage ==
Although the river is primarily designed for the drainage of storm water from Sha Tin with a catchment area of 37 km^{2}, it is also a popular place for recreational users such as rowers, anglers, riverside walkers and cyclists. There are continuous pedestrian promenades on both sides of the river.

Many species of trees has been planted along the riverside, such as the Chinese Banyan and a few cotton trees.

Shing Mun River is a popular place for water sports, such as: rowing, canoeing, kayaking and dragon boat racing. There are three boathouses in the river, located at Yuen Wo Road and Shek Mun respectively. The river has a standard of 2000 metres long for regattas.

== Sports events ==
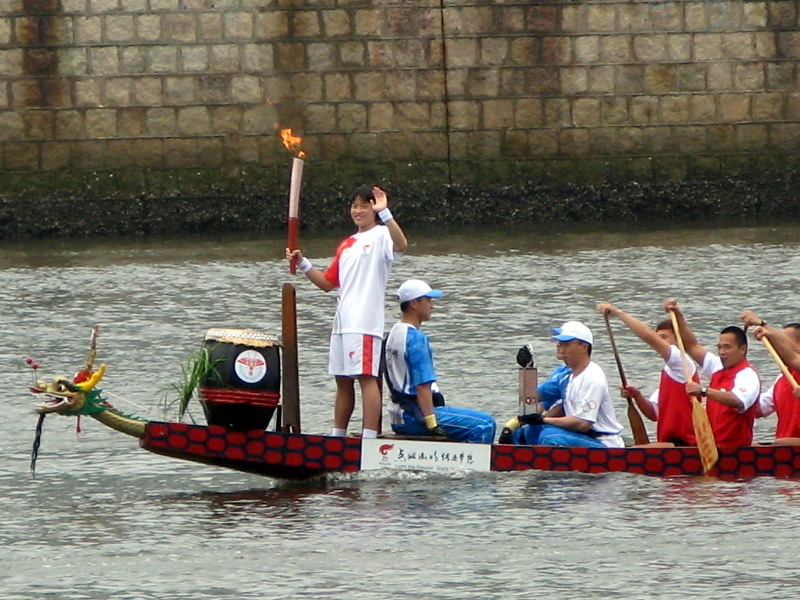
2008 Summer Olympics torch relay in Shing Mun River Channel.

- Dragon Boat Racing competition is held on Shing Mun River at Dragon Boat Festival every year since 1984.
- A section of the Hong Kong leg of the 2008 Summer Olympics torch relay was held on the Shing Mun River Channel.

== Pollution ==
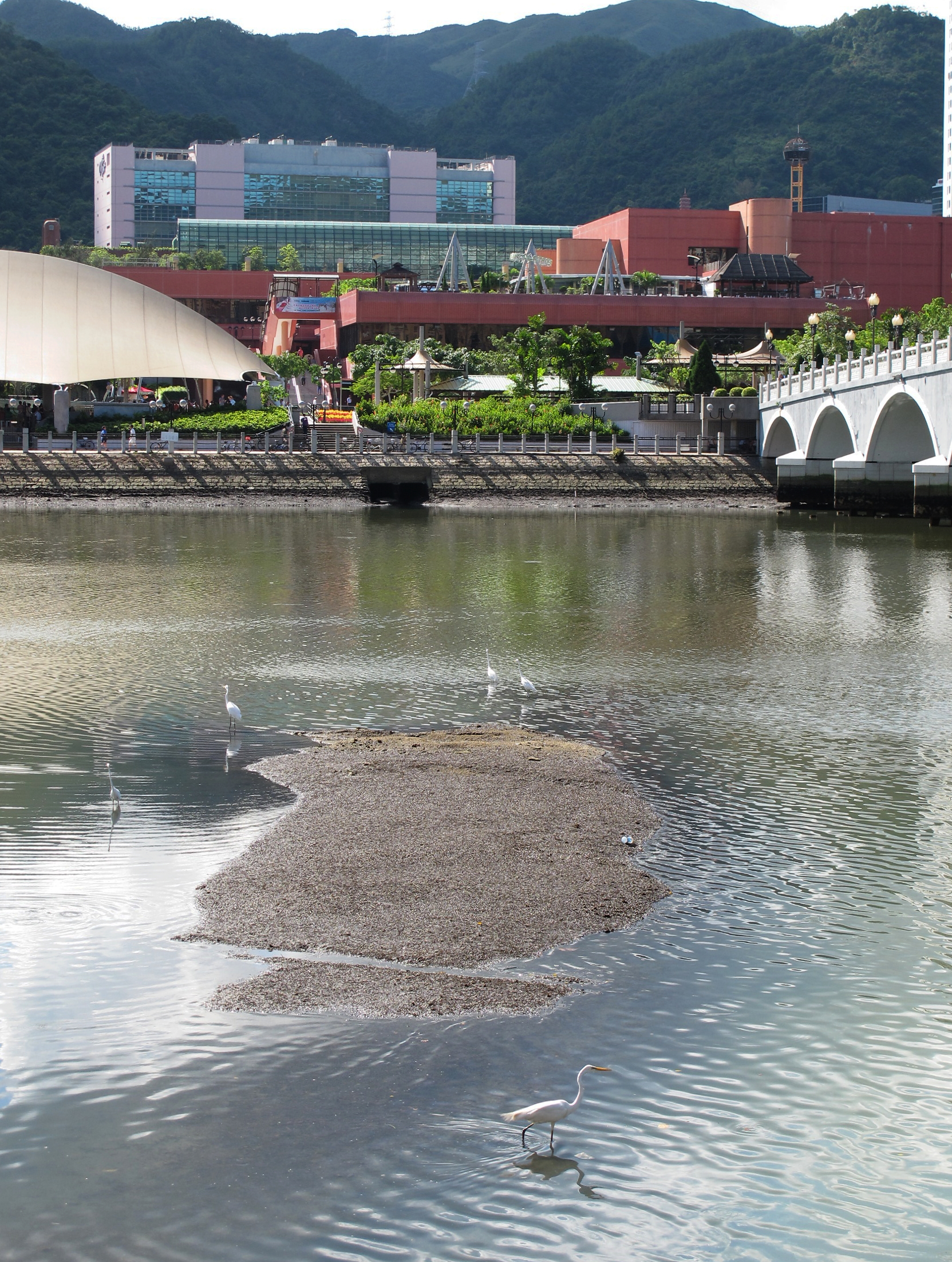
Birds on the river

The Shing Mun River was once heavily polluted from the indiscriminate discharges from livestock, industrial, commercial and domestic sources. The total organic pollution load from these discharges amount to a population equivalent of 160,000 in the 1980s. At that time, hardly any living creatures were found in the river.

The water quality of Shing Mun River has improved from bad to good in terms of the Water Quality Index since 1993. Lifeforms including fish and invertebrates have also reappeared in the river. In 2001, bioremediation and dredging works began to further improve the river environment. Levels of odour-causing sulphides and E. coli subsequently dropped sharply. But the water quality is still threatened by the polluted condition of Tolo Harbour, which backflows into the Shing Mun River during high tide, causing contamination.

An artificial river bank was also built along a 250-metre section near Man Lai Court, where there are relatively severe sediment accumulations and odour problems.

In late 2015, the Fo Tan Nullah, which flows into the Shing Mun River, changed colours several times. In early December it turned an electric blue, while later in the month it was ‘partly grey and partly turquoise’. Residents and green groups speculated on whether the pollution was caused by the illegal dumping of pigments or industrial waste. The Environmental Protection Department (EPD) and Drainage Services Department investigated but were unable to determine the cause of the pigmentation as of December 2015. An EPD test revealed that the river was polluted by sewage.

Aside from the colour changes in the Fo Tan Nullah, tests conducted in December 2015 by a private laboratory at the behest of Sha Tin District Councillor Scarlett Pong Oi-lan revealed that pollution had worsened in the Shing Mun River. The tests showed that the E. coli are 1,300 times the EPD standard, while water acidity and suspended solids are three times the standard. Pong said that the E. Coli concentration was at its highest level since 1995.

In early 2016, thousands of fish died in the river.

On 1 November 2016, the real estate company Link REIT was fined $15,000 for contravening the Water Pollution Control Ordinance because wastewater from the Mei Lam Shopping Centre, owned and managed by Link REIT, was being illegally discharged into the Shing Mun River. The company was ordered to rectify the situation immediately.

== See also ==
- Shing Mun Valley
- Sha Tin Sewage Treatment Works
- ClubONE Riviera
