= Fui Yiu Ha New Village =

Coordinates: 22.375954°N 114.197052°E

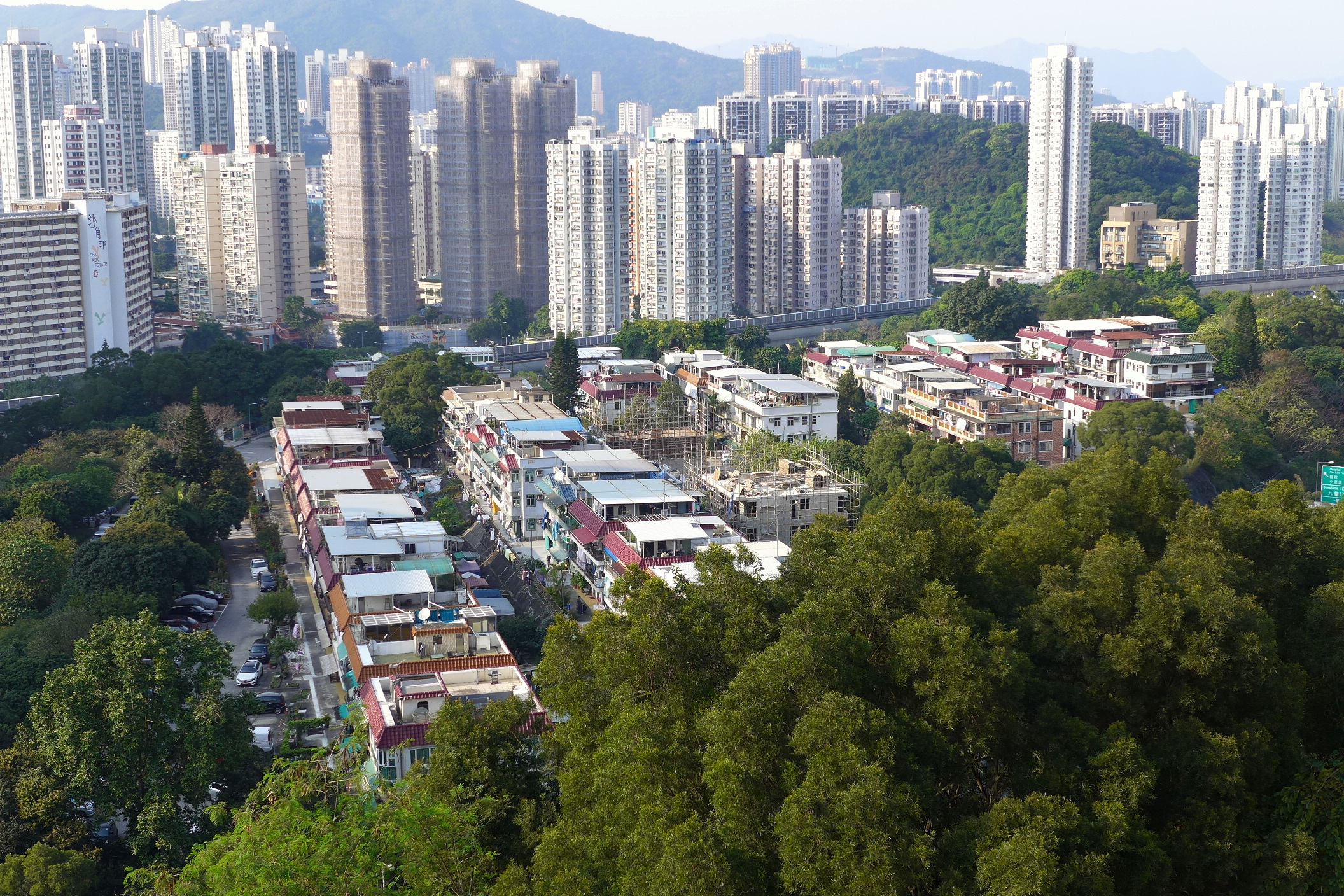
Fui Yiu Ha New Village (two rows of village houses on the left) and Sha Tin Wai New Village (rows of village houses on the right).

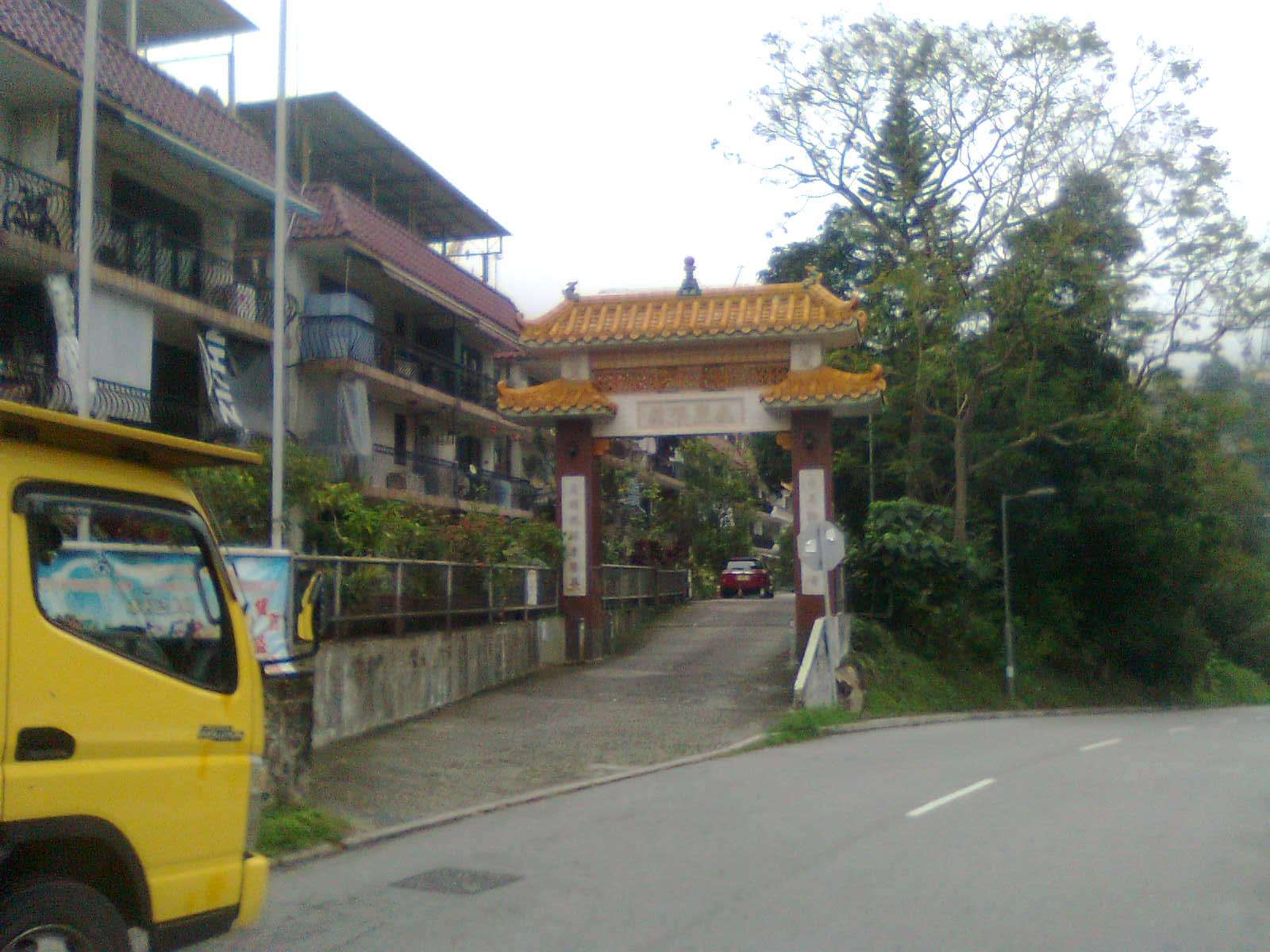
Entrance gate of Fui Yiu Ha New Village along Yiu Wai Street (窰圍街).

Fui Yiu Ha New Village or Fui Yiu Ha San Tsuen (灰窰下新村), also referred to as Fui Yiu Ha Resite Area or simply as Fui Yiu Ha Village or Fui Yiu Ha Tsuen (Chinese: 灰窰下村), is a village in Sha Tin District, Hong Kong.

== Administration ==
Fui Yiu Ha Resite Area is a recognized village under the New Territories Small House Policy.

== History ==
Fui Yiu Ha San Tsuen was relocated from Fui Yiu Ha Tsuen in 1981.

== See also ==
- Kau Yeuk (Sha Tin)
