= Lek Yuen =

Lek Yuen may refer to:

- Lek Yuen (constituency), a constituency in Sha Tin District
- Lek Yuen Bridge, a pedestrian footbridge in Sha Tin, Hong Kong
- Lek Yuen Estate, a public housing estate in Sha Tin, Hong Kong
- Sha Tin, for which Lek Yuen is an older name
