= Wo Che Estate =

Public housing estate in Sha Tin, Hong Kong

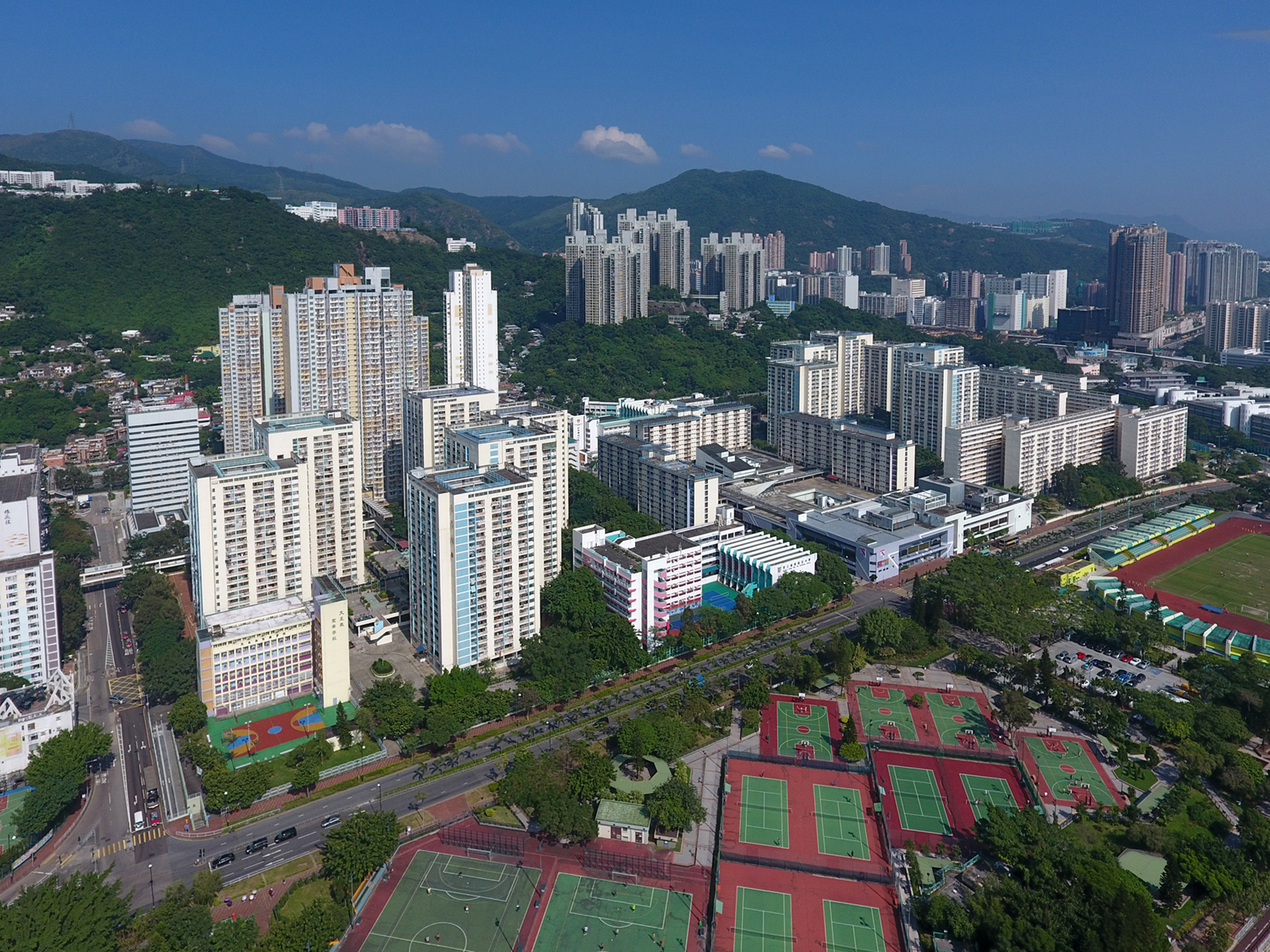
- Overview of Wo Che Estate
- Interactive map of Wo Che Estate

General information
- Location: 1-9 Hip Yan Street; 2 Tak Hau Street; 7-9 Wo Che Street; 6 Fung Wo Lane; 2, 6 and 8 Fung Shun Street; Sha Tin; New Territories, Hong Kong
- Coordinates: 22.38857°N 114.1959°E
- Status: Completed
- Category: Public rental housing
- Population: 18,575 (2016)
- No. of blocks: 13
- No. of units: 6,297

Construction
- Constructed: 1977; 49 years ago
- Authority: Hong Kong Housing Authority

Wo Che Estate (Chinese: 禾輋邨) is a public housing estate in Sha Tin, New Territories, Hong Kong. It is the second public housing estate in Sha Tin, built on the reclaimed land of Sha Tin Hoi, located near Fung Wo Estate, Lek Yuen Estate and Sha Tin Sports Ground. The estate consists of thirteen residential blocks completed in 1977, 1980 and 2003 respectively.

== History ==
On 22 February 2021, an eight-year-old girl was assaulted by a man wearing a purple mask in his 20s at the estate.

== Houses ==
Name	Chinese name	Building type	Completed
Hong Wo House	康和樓	Twin Tower	1977
Fung Wo House	豐和樓	Twin Tower	1977
Shun Wo House	順和樓	Twin Tower	1977
Man Wo House	民和樓	Twin Tower	1980
Tai Wo House	泰和樓	Twin Tower	1980
Foo Wo House	富和樓	Twin Tower	1980
Yan Wo House	欣和樓	Single H (Special Edition)	1980
Mei Wo House	美和樓	Single H (Special Edition)	1980
Hip Wo House	協和樓	Double H (Special Edition)	1980
Tak Wo House	德和樓	Old Slab	1977
Hau Wo House	厚和樓	Old Slab	1978
Chi Wo House	智和樓	Old Slab	1978
King Wo House	景和樓	New Cruciform (Ver.1999)	2003

== Demographics ==
According to the 2016 by-census, Wo Che Estate had a population of 18,575. The median age was 46.8 and the majority of residents (97.4 per cent) were of Chinese ethnicity. The average household size was 3 people. The median monthly household income of all households (i.e. including both economically active and inactive households) was HK$22,490.

== Politics ==
For the 2019 District Council election, the estate fell within two constituencies. Most of the estate is located in the Wo Che Estate constituency, which was formerly represented by Raymond Li Chi-wang until October 2021, while King Wo House falls within the Lek Yuen constituency, which was formerly represented by Jimmy Sham Tsz-kit until July 2021.

== COVID-19 pandemic ==
King Wo House of the estate was put under lockdown between 19 and 20 February 2022. Foo Wo House was also in lockdown since 26 February. Man Wo House and Yan Wo House was sealed on 27 February. Shun Wo House house was put under lockdown on 28 February 2022.

== See also ==
- Public housing estates in Sha Tin
