= Fung Wo Estate =

Public housing estate in Sha Tin, Hong Kong

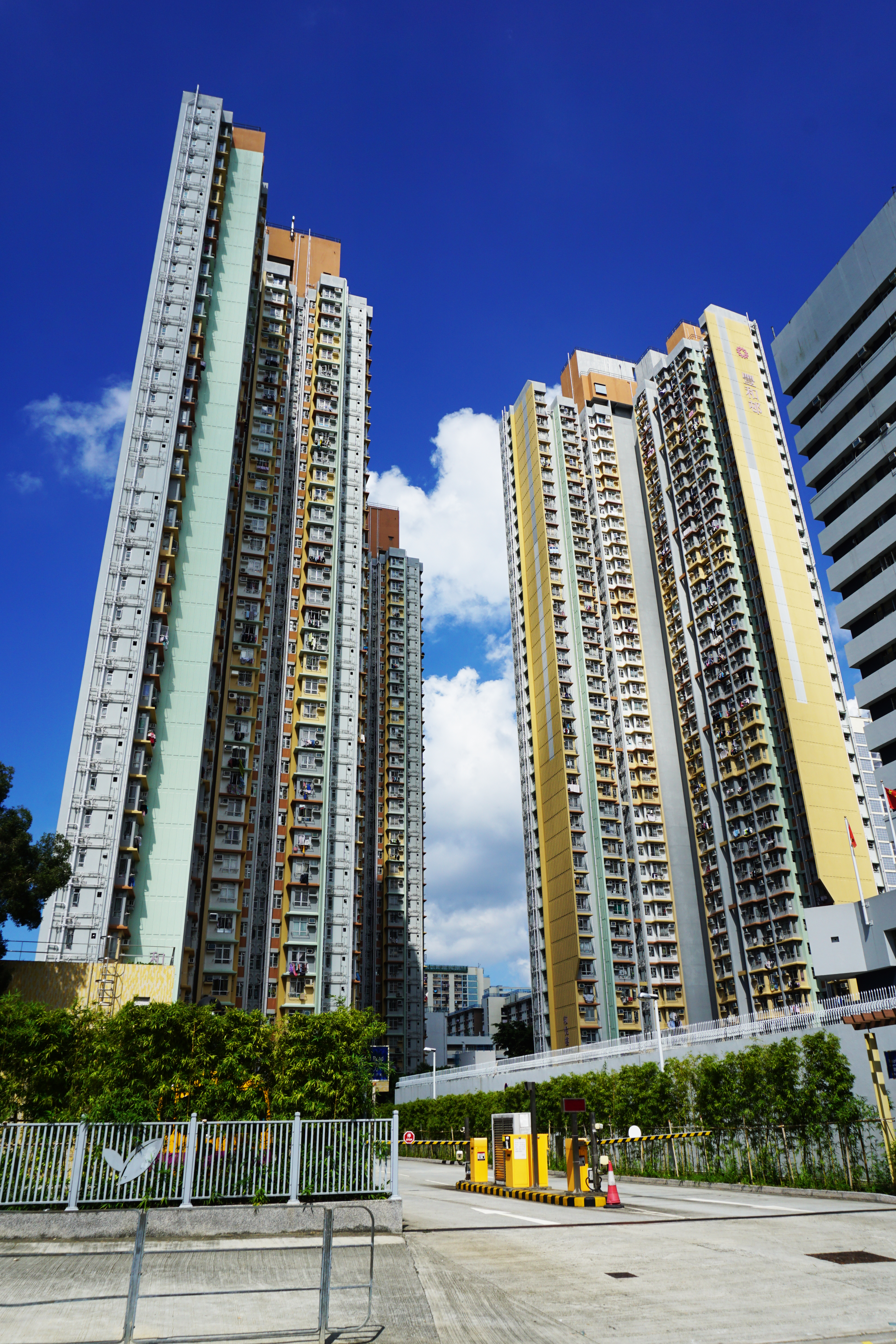
- Fung Wo Estate
- Interactive map of Fung Wo Estate

General information
- Location: 3 Fung Shun Street, Sha Tin; New Territories, Hong Kong
- Coordinates: 22.387663°N 114.192945°E
- Status: Completed
- Category: Public rental housing
- Population: 3,547 (2016)
- No. of blocks: 3
- No. of units: 1,600

Construction
- Constructed: 2013; 13 years ago
- Authority: Hong Kong Housing Authority

Fung Wo Estate (Chinese: 豐和邨) is a public housing estate in Sha Tin, New Territories, Hong Kong near Wo Che Estate on the site of the former Sha Tin Police Married Quarters, which was demolished in 2007. The estate consists of three residential blocks completed in 2013.

== Houses ==
Name	Chinese name	Building type	Completed
Wo Yue House	和悅樓	Non-standard	2013
Wo On House	和安樓	Non-standard	2013
Wo Shun House	和順樓	Non-standard	2013

== Demographics ==
According to the 2016 by-census, Fung Wo Estate had a population of 3,547. The median age was 39.9 and the majority of residents (99.1 per cent) were of Chinese ethnicity. The average household size was 2.2 people. The median monthly household income of all households (i.e. including both economically active and inactive households) was HK$15,000.

== Politics ==
Fung Wo Estate is located in Lek Yuen constituency of the Sha Tin District Council. It was formerly represented by Jimmy Sham Tsz-kit, who was elected in the 2019 elections until July 2021.

== See also ==
- Public housing estates in Sha Tin
