= Shek Mun station =

MTR station in the New Territories, Hong Kong

Shek Mun 石門
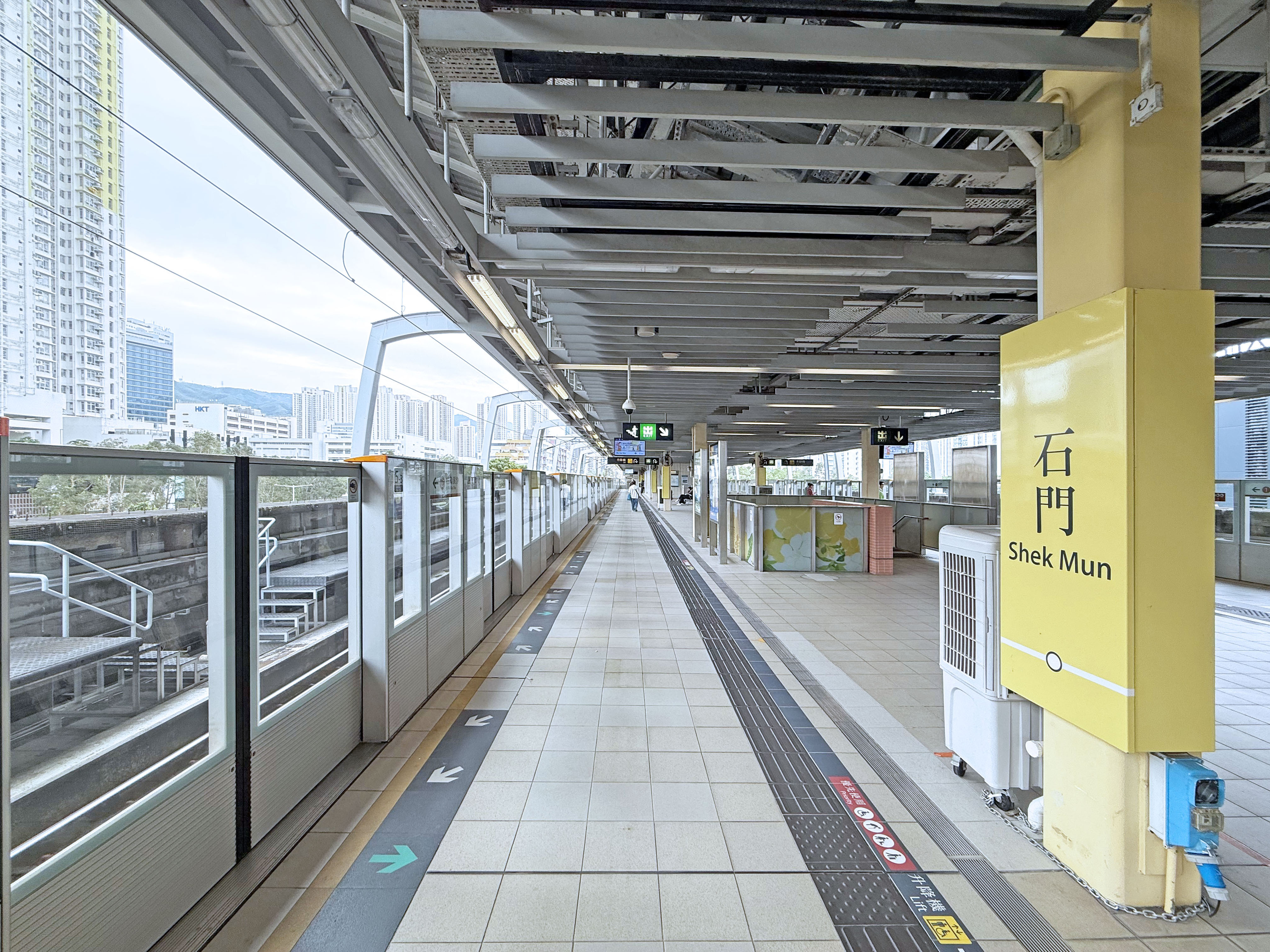
- Platform 2

Chinese name
- Traditional Chinese: 石門
- Simplified Chinese: 石门
- Cantonese Yale: Sehkmùn
- Literal meaning: Rock(y) door
Transcriptions
Standard Mandarin
- Hanyu Pinyin: Shímén
Yue: Cantonese
- Yale Romanization: Sehkmùn
- Jyutping: Sek6mun4

General information
- Location: On Ming Street, Shek Mun; Sha Tin District, Hong Kong
- Coordinates: 22°23′16″N 114°12′30″E
- System: MTR rapid transit station
- Owner: KCR Corporation
- Operator: MTR Corporation
- Line: Tuen Ma line
- Platforms: 2 (1 island platform)
- Tracks: 2
- Connections: Bus, minibus

Construction
- Structure type: Elevated
- Accessible: yes

Other information
- Station code: SHM

History
- Opened: 21 December 2004; 21 years ago

Services
Preceding station	MTR	Following station
City One towards Tuen Mun	Tuen Ma line	Tai Shui Hang towards Wu Kai Sha
Track layout
Location
- Location within MTR

Shek Mun (Chinese: 石門) is a station on the Tuen Ma line of Hong Kong. To the west, it serves the Shek Mun Industrial Area and northeastern portion of City One, including Siu Lek Yuen Playground. A new campus of the Hong Kong Baptist University (including a primary and a secondary school) is situated just outside exit D, to the east of the station.

== History ==
On 21 December 2004, Shek Mun station opened to the public with other KCR Ma On Shan Rail stations.

On 14 February 2020, the Ma On Shan line was extended south to a new terminus in Kai Tak, as part of the first phase of the Shatin to Central Link Project. The Ma On Shan Line was renamed Tuen Ma Line Phase 1 at the time. Shek Mun station became an intermediate station on this temporary new line.

On 27 June 2021, the Tuen Ma line Phase 1 officially merged with the West Rail line in East Kowloon to form the new Tuen Ma line, as part of the Shatin to Central link project. Hence, Shek Mun was included in the project and is now an intermediate station on the Tuen Ma line, Hong Kong's longest railway line.

== Station layout ==
P	Platform 1	← Tuen Ma line towards Tuen Mun (City One)
P	Island platform, doors will open on the left
P	Platform 2	Tuen Ma line towards Wu Kai Sha (Tai Shui Hang) →
C	Concourse	Exits
C	Concourse	Customer services, toilets, MTRShops

Platforms 1 and 2 share the same island platform.

=== Exits ===
- A: Ever Gain Centre, King's Wing Plaza 1
- B: Shek Mun Estate
- C: Technology Park, King's Wing Plaza 2, HKCTS Entry Penrit Service New Territories East Centre, HKCRA Jockey Club Shek Mun Rowing Centre
- D: HKBU CIE
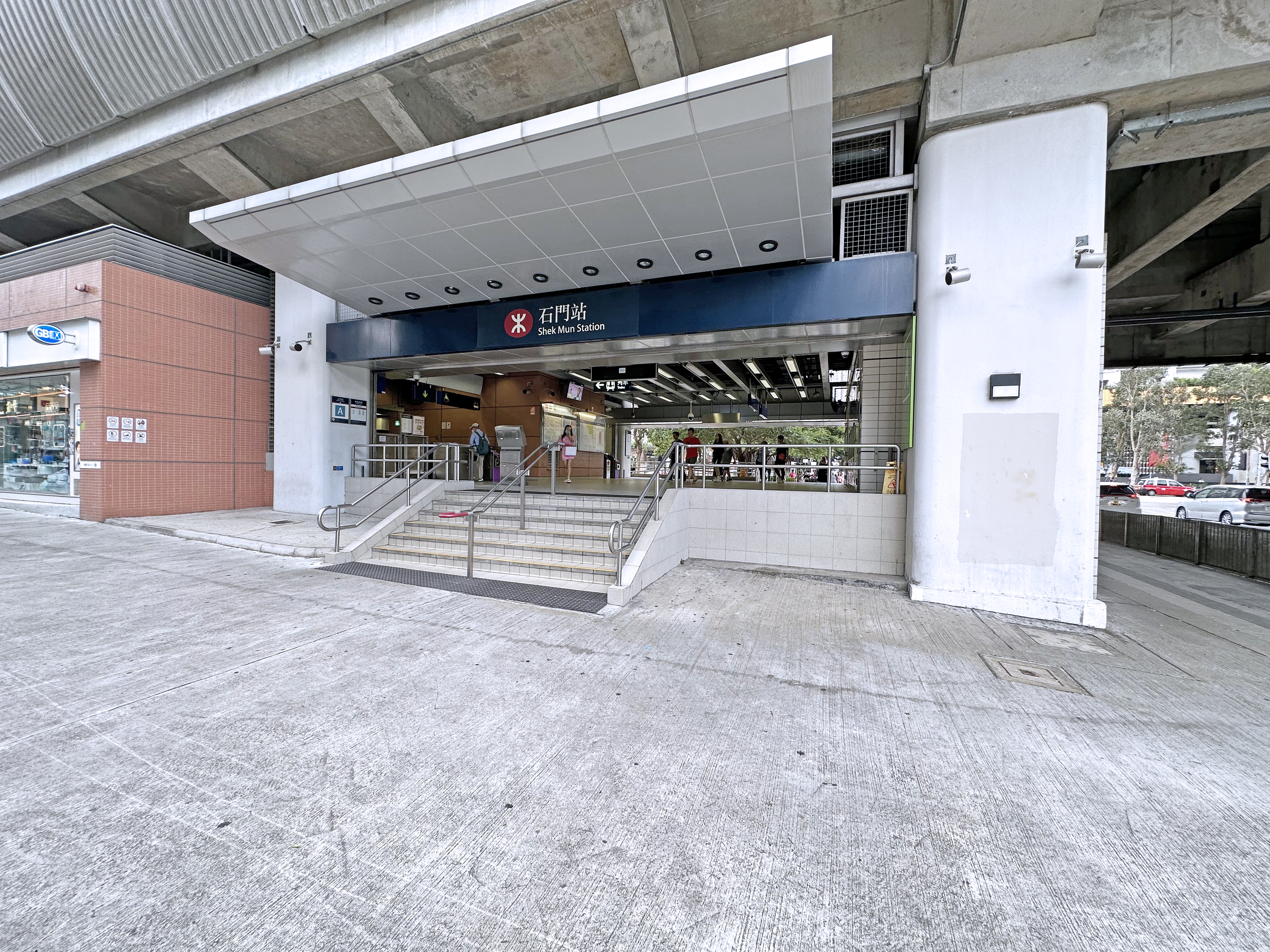
Exit A

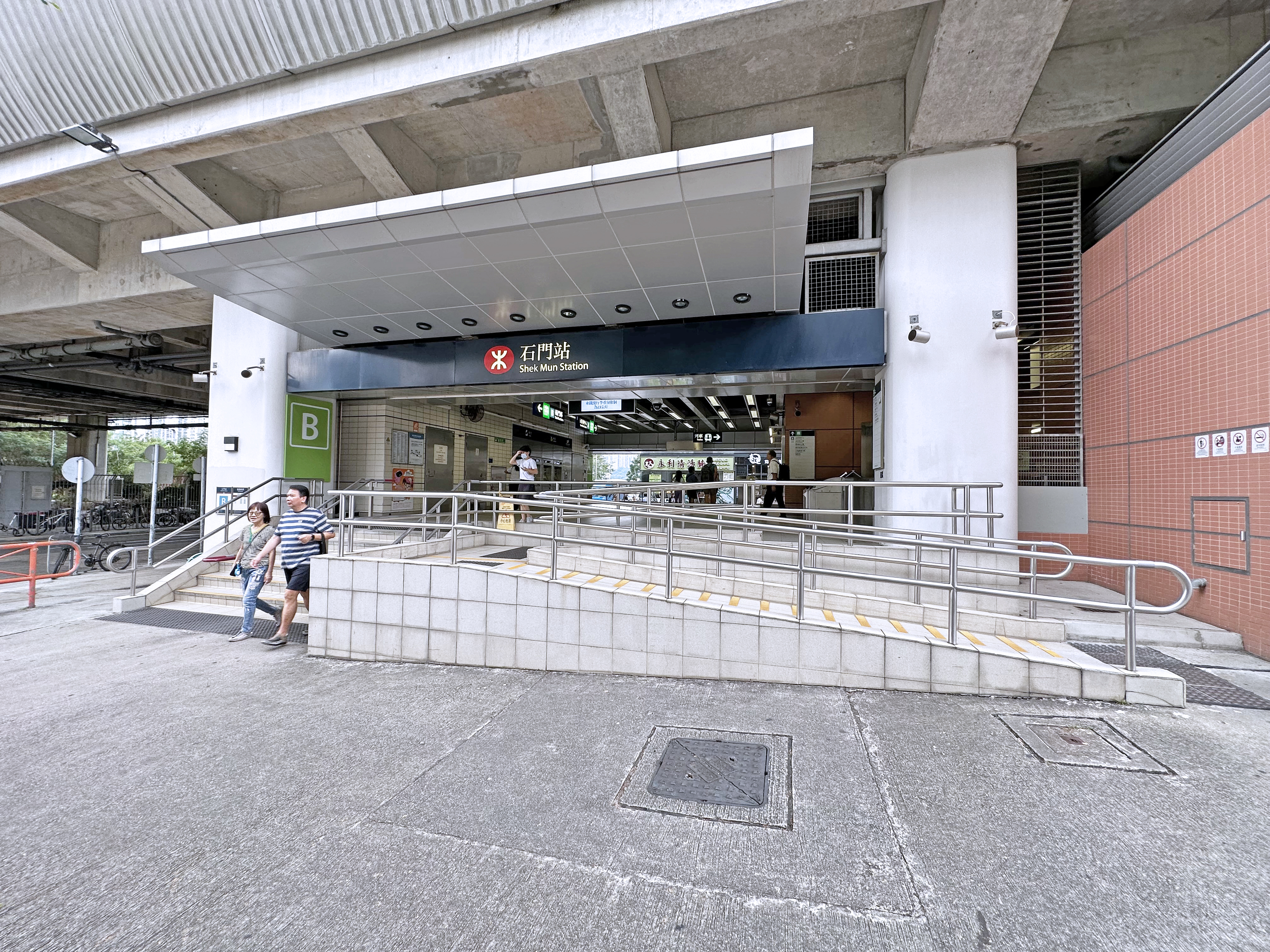
Exit B

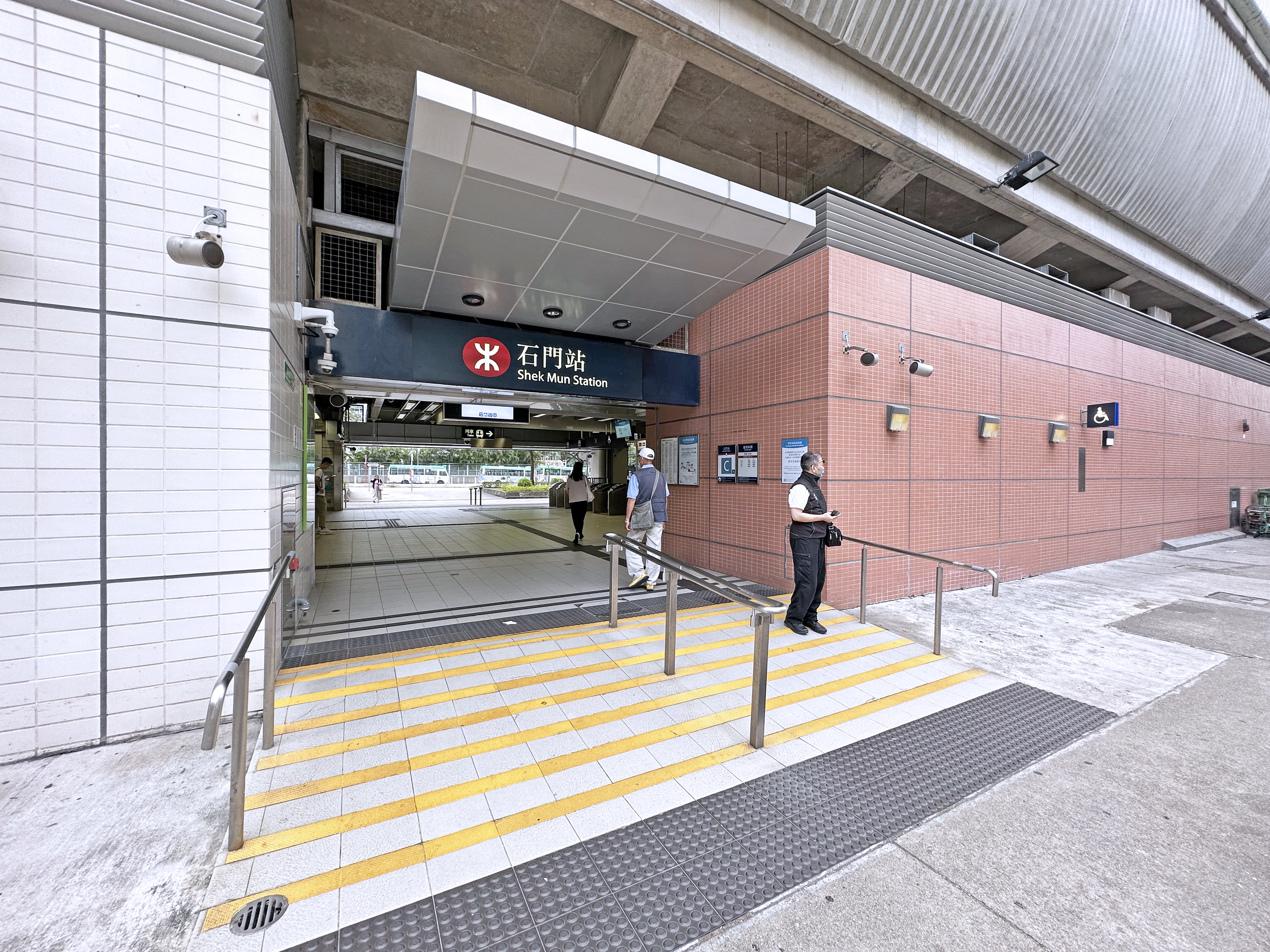
Exit C

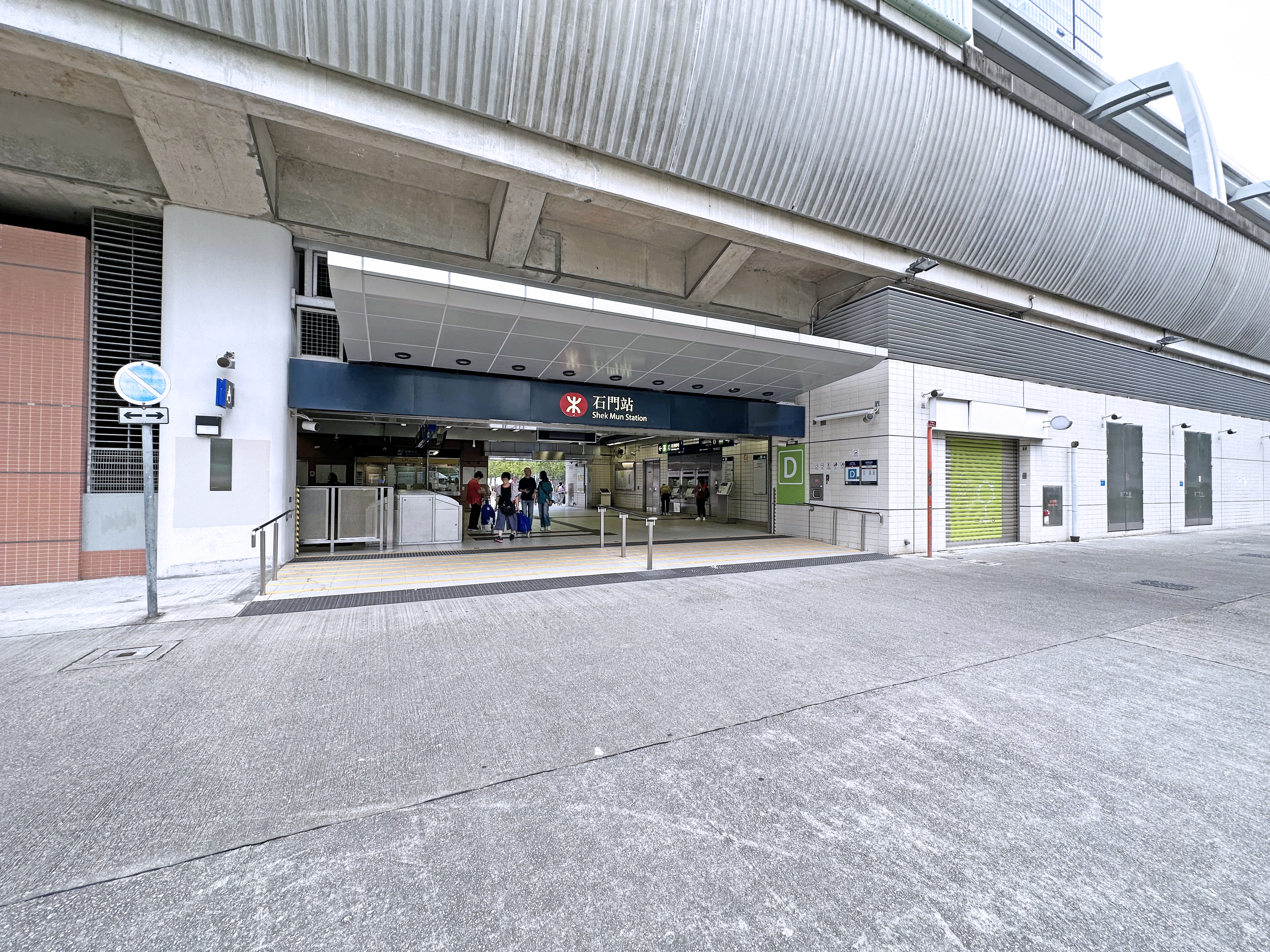
Exit D
