= City One station =

MTR station in the New Territories, Hong Kong

City One 第一城
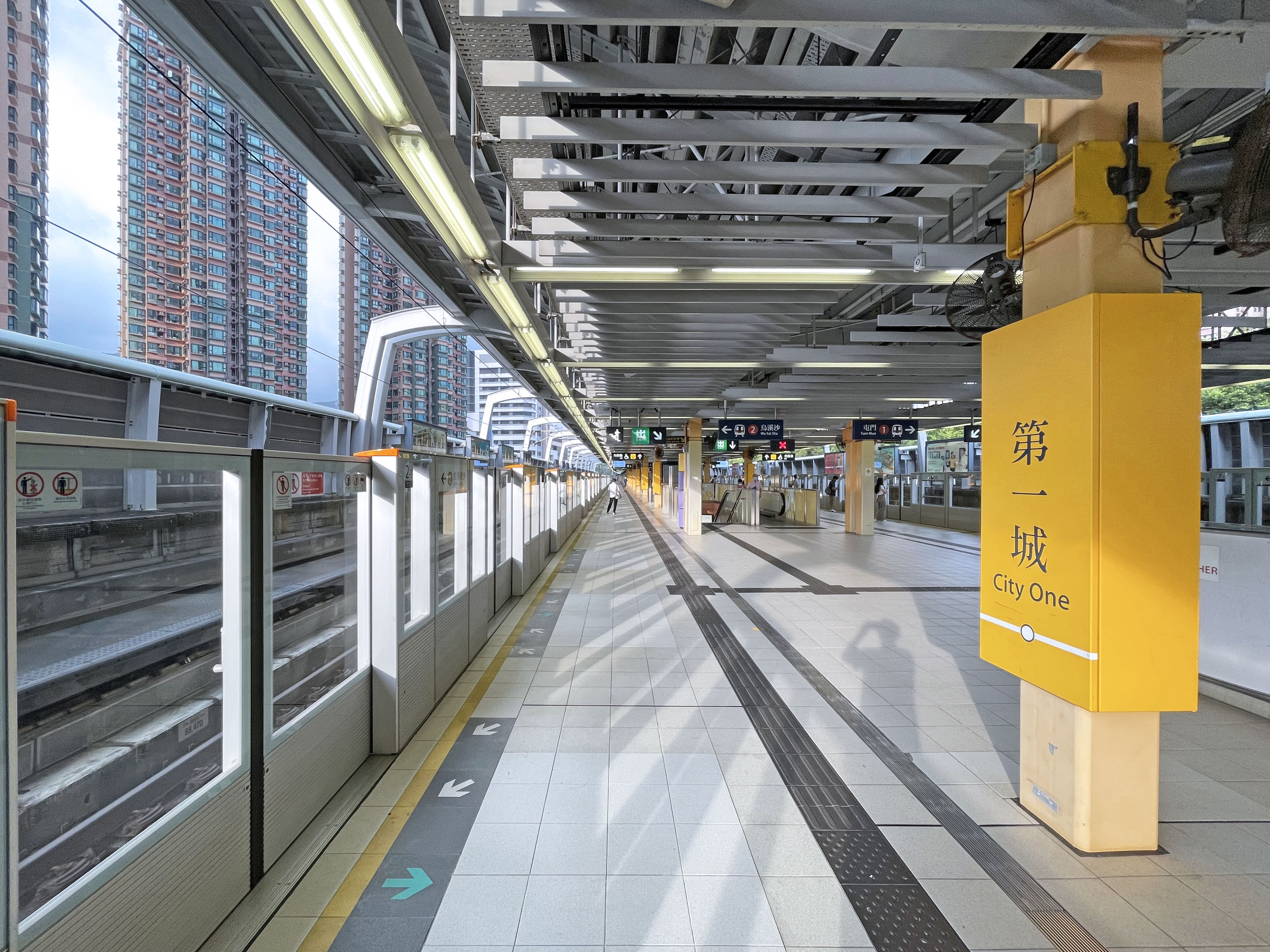
- Platform 2

Chinese name
- Chinese: 第一城
- Cantonese Yale: Daih Yāt Sìng
- Literal meaning: First City
Transcriptions
Standard Mandarin
- Hanyu Pinyin: Dìyīchéng
Yue: Cantonese
- Yale Romanization: Daih Yāt Sìng
- Jyutping: Dai6 Jat1 Sing4

General information
- Location: Chap Wai Kon Street; Sha Tin District, Hong Kong
- Coordinates: 22°22′58″N 114°12′13″E
- System: MTR rapid transit station
- Owner: KCR Corporation
- Operator: MTR Corporation
- Line: Tuen Ma line
- Platforms: 2 (1 island platform)
- Tracks: 2
- Connections: Bus, minibus

Construction
- Structure type: Elevated
- Accessible: yes

Other information
- Station code: CIO

History
- Opened: 21 December 2004; 21 years ago

Services
Preceding station	MTR	Following station
Sha Tin Wai towards Tuen Mun	Tuen Ma line	Shek Mun towards Wu Kai Sha
Track layout
Location
- Location within MTR

City One (Chinese: 第一城) is a station on the Tuen Ma line in Hong Kong. It serves City One Shatin (the station's namesake), Prima Villa, Sunshine Grove, Yu Chui Court and Yue Tin Court, and also serves five schools. Prince of Wales Hospital is also nearby. The print featured on the platform pillar and glass barrier is the annual dragon boat race held at Shing Mun River during the Dragon Boat Festival.

== History ==
On 21 December 2004, City One station opened to the public with the rest of KCR Ma On Shan Rail stations.

On 14 February 2020, the Ma On Shan line was extended south to a new terminus in Kai Tak, as part of the first phase of the Shatin to Central Link Project. The Ma On Shan Line was renamed Tuen Ma Line Phase 1 at the time. City One station became an intermediate station on this temporary new line.

On 27 June 2021, the Tuen Ma line Phase 1 officially merged with the West Rail line in East Kowloon to form the new Tuen Ma line, as part of the Shatin to Central link project. Hence, City One was included in the project and is now an intermediate station on the Tuen Ma line, Hong Kong's longest railway line.

== Station layout ==
P	Platform 1	← Tuen Ma line towards Tuen Mun (Sha Tin Wai)
P	Island platform, doors will open on the left
P	Platform 2	Tuen Ma line towards Wu Kai Sha (Shek Mun) →
C	Concourse	Exits
C	Concourse	Customer services, toilets, MTRShops

Platforms 1 and 2 share the same island platform.

=== Exits ===
- A: Yue Tin Court
- B: Prince of Wales Hospital
- C: City One Shatin
- D: Yu Chui Court
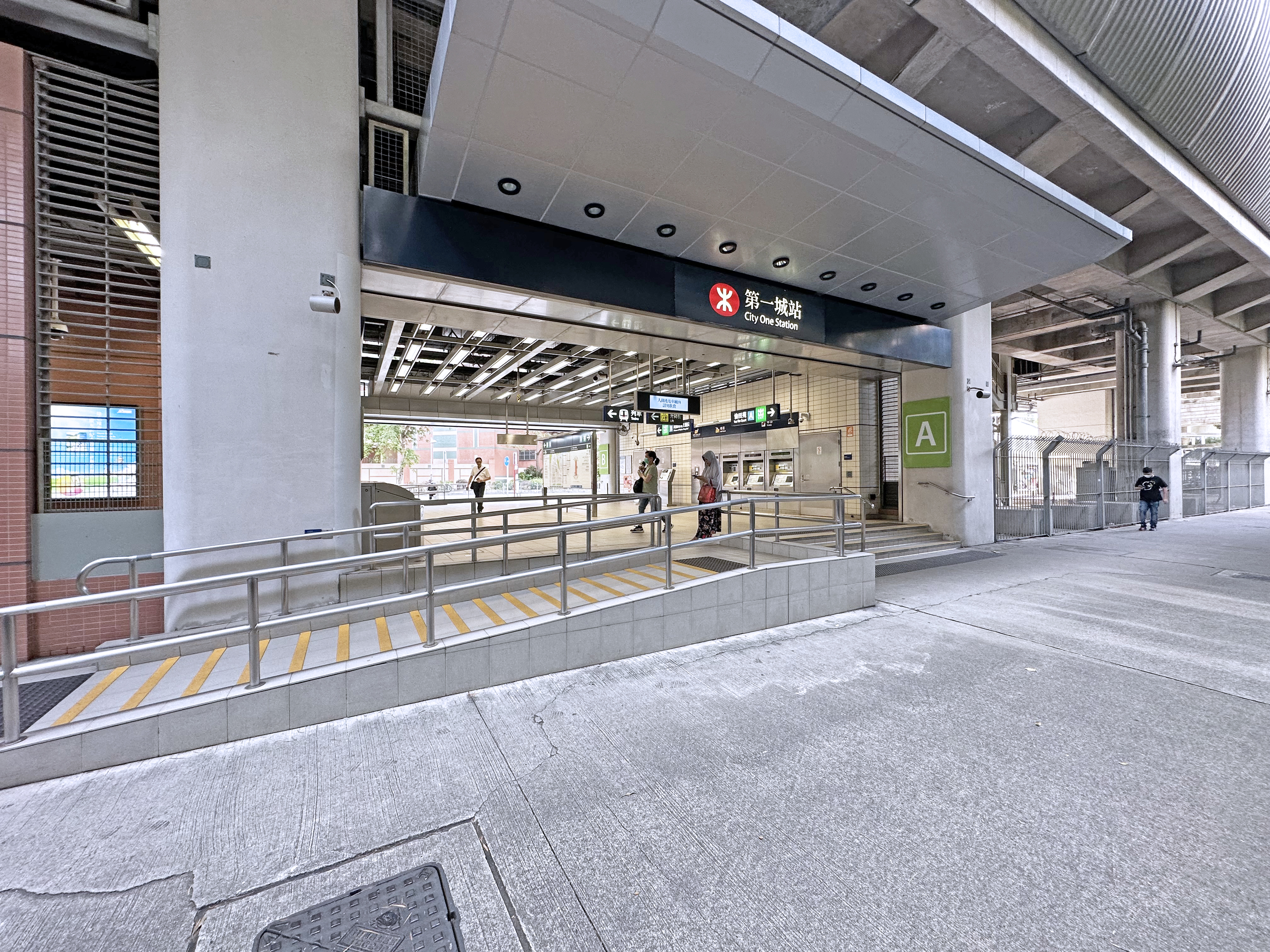
Exit A

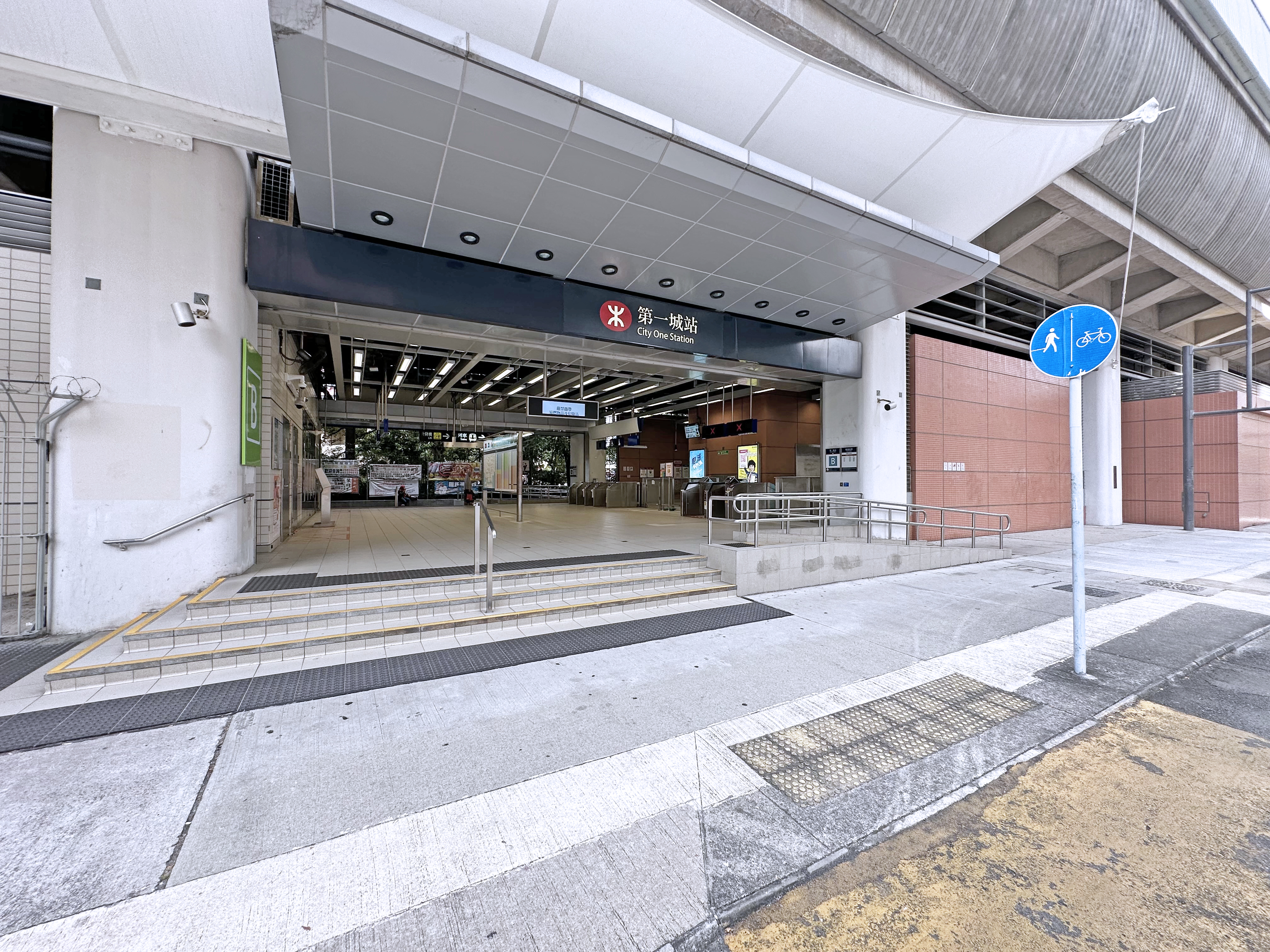
Exit B

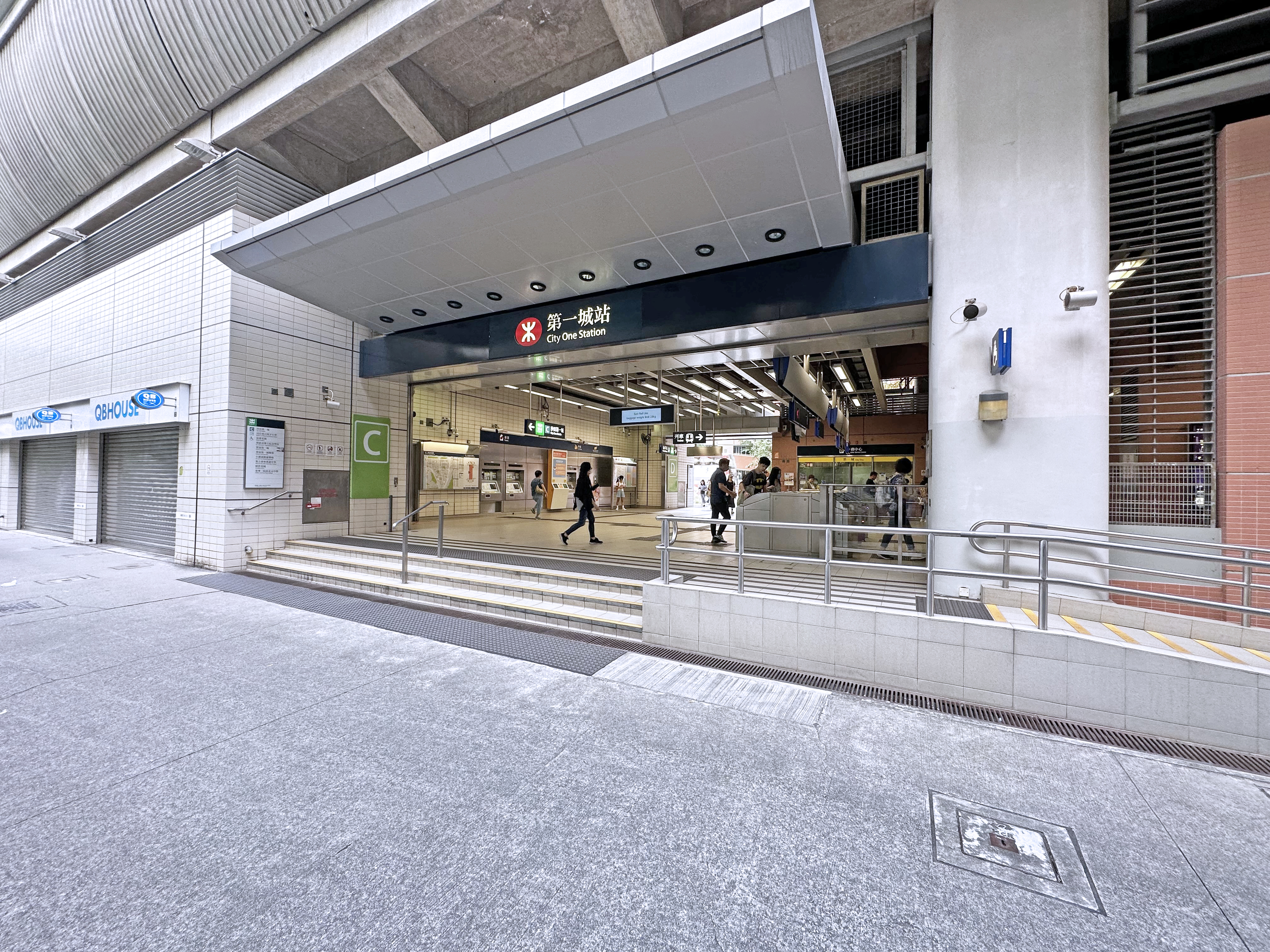
Exit C

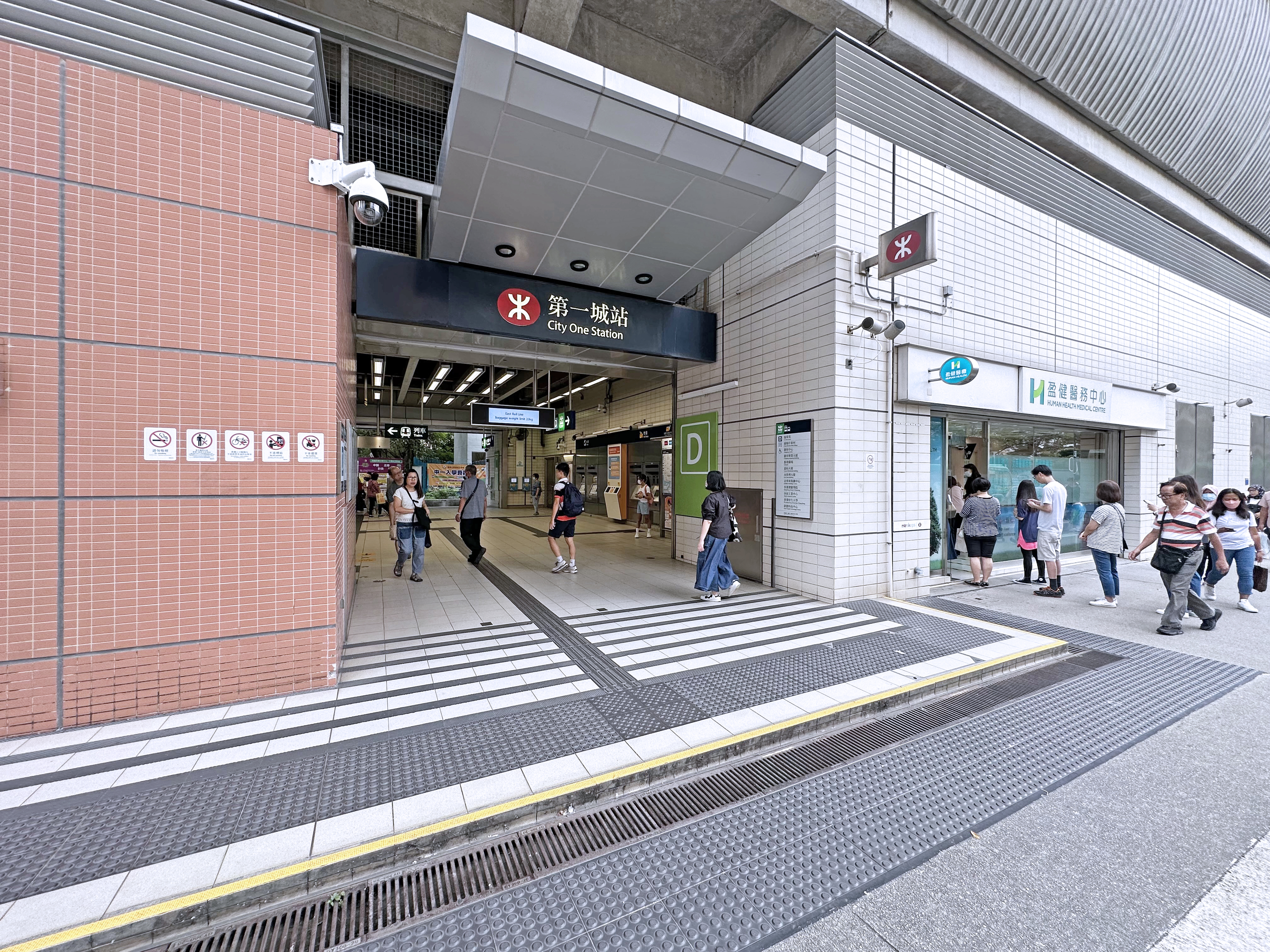
Exit D
