= Public housing estates in Sha Tin =

Public housing in Sha Tin, Hong Kong

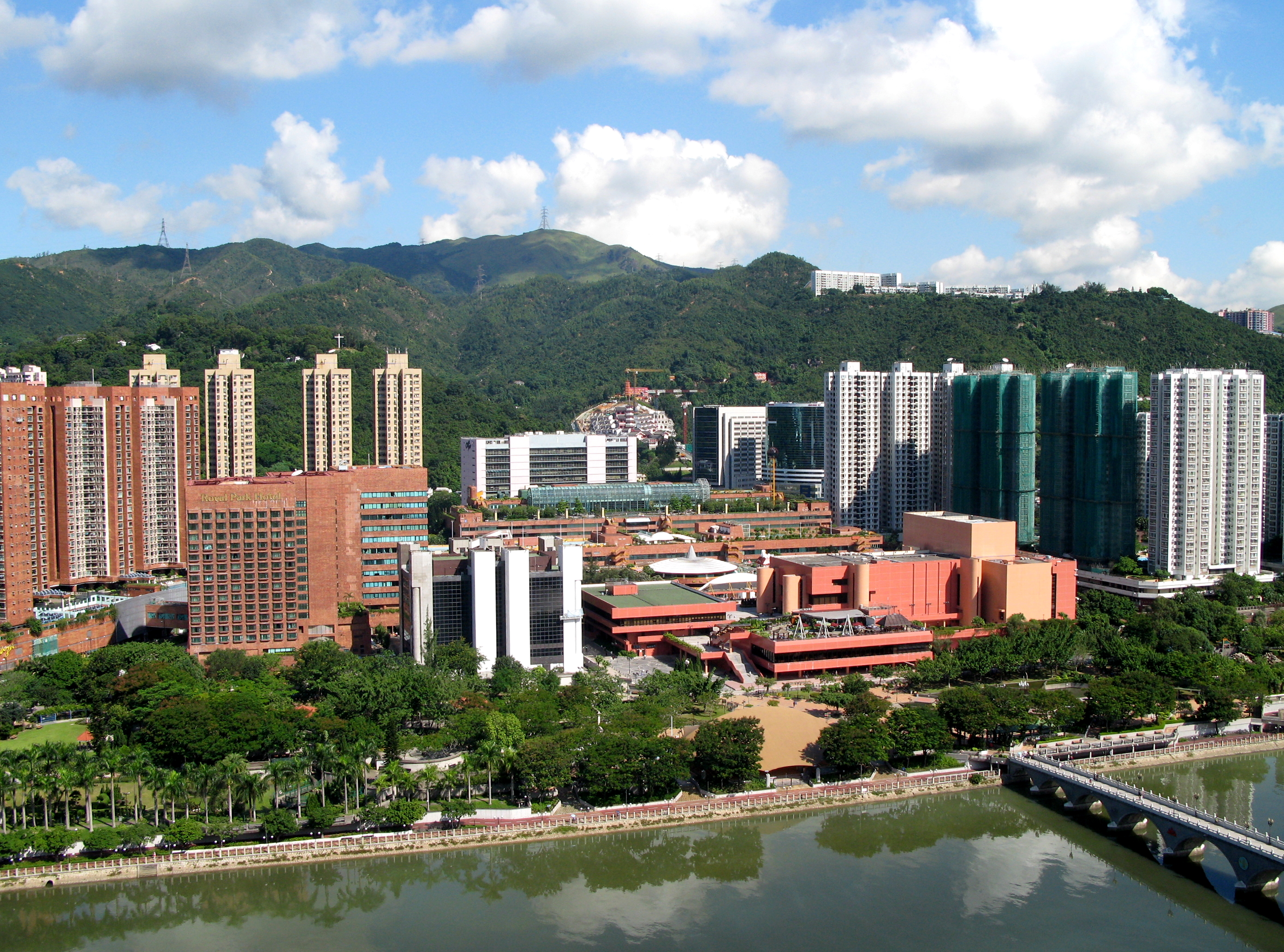
The town centre of Sha Tin New Town.

The following is a list of public housing estates in Sha Tin, Hong Kong, including Home Ownership Scheme (HOS), Private Sector Participation Scheme (PSPS), Sandwich Class Housing Scheme (SCHS), Flat-for-Sale Scheme (FFSS), and Tenants Purchase Scheme (TPS) estates.

== History ==
When Sha Tin New Town was being developed, the beach and Sha Tin Hoi was reclaimed to construct Lek Yuen Estate, Wo Che Estate, Sha Kok Estate, and Jat Min Chuen. The first plan for the development of Sha Tin was approved in 1961, with the Draft Sha Tin Outline Development Plan being issued in October 1972. The development of Ma On Shan as an extension of Sha Tin New Town was approved in August 1979.

Sha Tin transformed from a rural township of about 30,000 people in the early 1970s to a major community with a population of around 660,200 today. The total development area of Sha Tin New Town, including Ma On Shan, is about 3,590 hectares, designed for a planned population of 771,100. The new town mainly occupies land reclaimed from Tolo Harbour. Significant road expansions and transport infrastructure, including the Sha Tin Heights Tunnel and connections to the Mass Transit Railway East Rail and Ma On Shan Rail, support the new town.

== Overview ==
Name		Type	Inaug.	No. blocks	No. units	Notes
Fung Wo Estate	豐和邨	Public	2013	3	1,600	
Jat Min Chuen	乙明邨	Public	1981	3	3,730	HK Housing Society
Kwong Yuen Estate	廣源邨	TPS	1989	6	1,807	
Lek Yuen Estate	瀝源邨	Public	1975	7	3,219	
Pok Hong Estate	博康邨	TPS	1982	8	5,481	
Shui Chuen O Estate	水泉澳邨	Public	2014-15	18	11,123	
Sha Kok Estate	沙角邨	Public	1980	7	6,420	
Shek Mun Estate	碩門邨	Public	2009, 2018	2	2,000	Extra four blocks are under construction
Sunshine Grove	晴碧花園	Sandwich	1999	2	508	HK Housing Society
Wo Che Estate	禾輋邨	Public	1977	13	6,297	
Greenhill Villa	綠怡雅苑	SSFP	2019	3	1,020	HK Housing Society
Hong Lam Court	康林苑	HOS	1990	3	1,050	
Kwong Lam Court	廣林苑	HOS	1990	3	1,832	
Yu Chui Court	愉翠苑	HOS	2001	16	4,176	
Yue Shing Court	愉城苑	HOS	1980	4	530	
Yue Tin Court	愉田苑	HOS	1982	7	1,704	

== Estates ==
=== Fung Wo Estate ===
Fung Wo Estate opened beside Wo Che Estate in 2013 on the site of the former Sha Tin Police Married Quarters, which were demolished in 2007. It comprises three blocks housing 3,500 people.

Name	Type	Completion
Wo Yue House	Non-standard	2013
Wo On House	Non-standard	2013
Wo Shun House	Non-standard	2013

=== Lek Yuen Estate ===
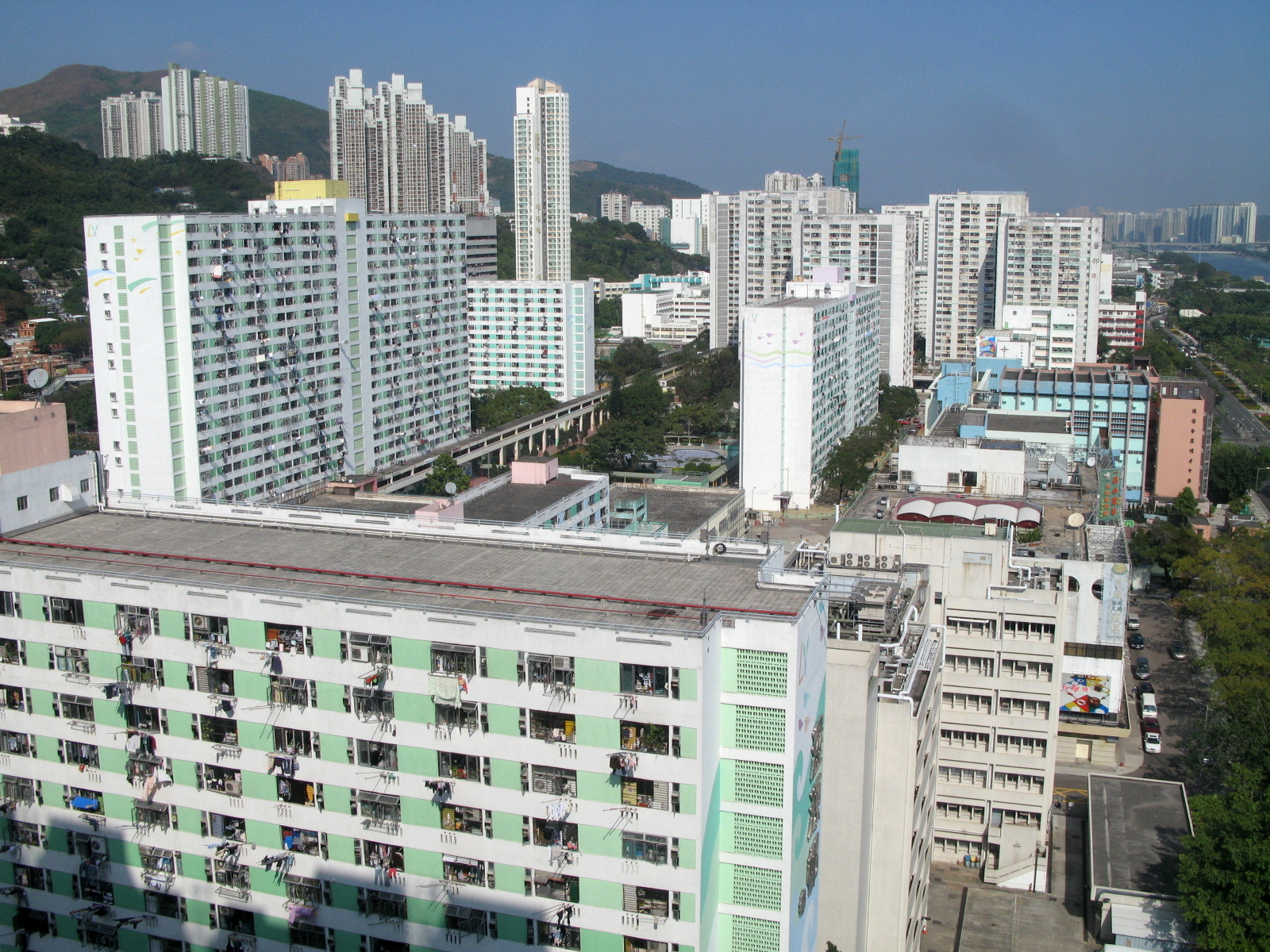
Lek Yuen Estate

Lek Yuen Estate (Chinese: 瀝源邨) was the first public housing estate in Sha Tin, and is built on the reclaimed land of Sha Tin Hoi, located near Wo Che Estate and Sha Tin station. The estate consists of seven residential blocks completed in 1975.

Lek Yuen Estate was one of the first of a "new generation" of estates which were more self-contained with regard to the provision of amenities and shopping. Covered walkways allow tenants to do their shopping close to home, without relying other modes of transportation. This is now a standard element of housing estate design in Hong Kong. When the old Sha Tin market was being demolished, many merchants were relocated to the Lek Yuen Estate shops, though some complained of comparatively "exorbitant" rents.

The shopping centre is now owned by Link REIT. The estate locality has several other facilities including a market, a park, a public clinic, an entertainment building called "Sha Tin Fun City" (沙田娛樂城), and numerous schools. An elevated walkway runs through the estate, linking it to Sha Tin Town Centre (to the south) and Wo Che Estate (to the north).

English name	Chinese name	Type	Completion
Wing Shui House	榮瑞樓	Old Slab	1975
Wah Fung House	華豐樓	Old Slab	1975
Fu Yu House	富裕樓	Old Slab	1975
Kwai Wo House	貴和樓	Old Slab	1975
Fook Hoi House	福海樓	Old Slab	1975
Luk Chuen House	祿泉樓	Old Slab	1975
Sau Chuen House	壽全樓	Old Slab	1975

=== Pok Hong Estate ===
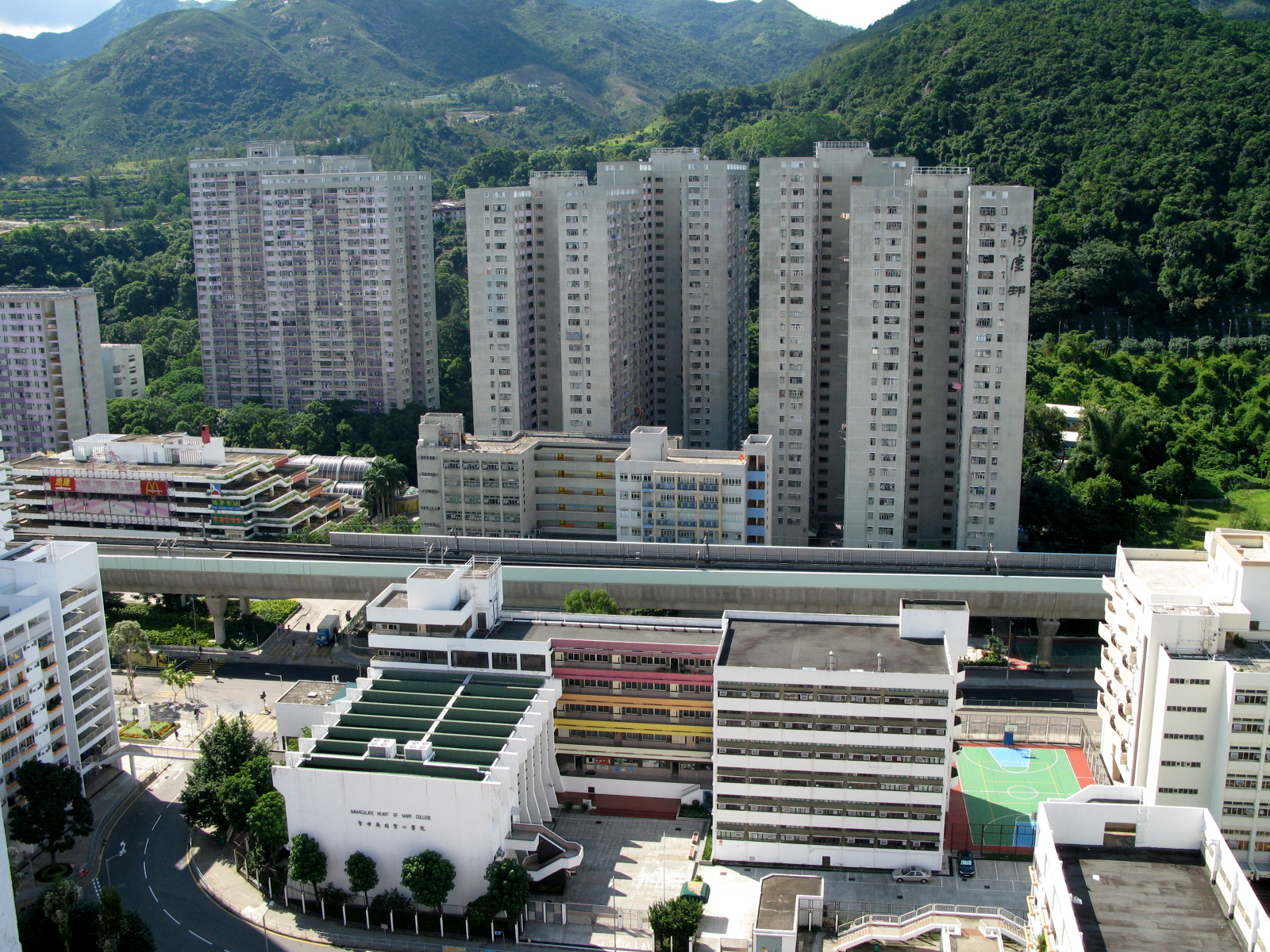
Pok Hong Estate

Pok Hong Estate (Chinese: 博康邨) is a mixed estate consisting of eight residential blocks completed in 1982, 1983 and 1985. Its site was originally a shallow sand beach near Sha Tin Hoi. Some of the flats were sold to the tenants through Tenants Purchase Scheme Phase 5 in 2002. In 2019, the housing estate has an estimated population of 16,063.

Name	Type	Completion
Pok Yue House	Old Slab	1982
Pok Wah House	Old Slab	1982
Pok Man House	Double H	1983
Pok On House	Double H	1983
Pok Tat House	Double H	1985
Pok Yat House	Trident 2	1985
Pok Chi House	Trident 2	1985
Pok Tai House	Trident 2	1985

=== Sha Kok Estate ===
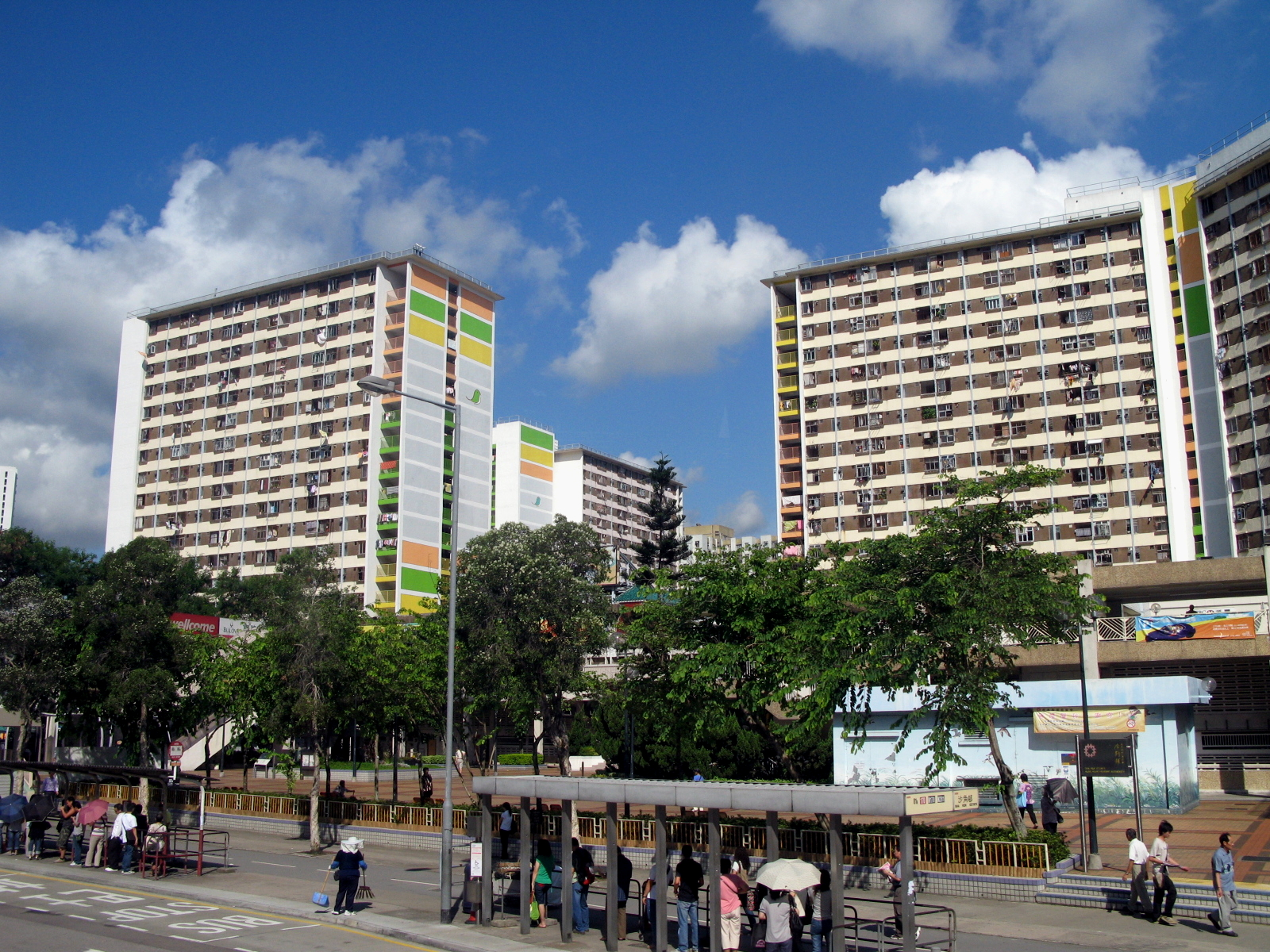
Bean Goose House and Sand Martin House in Sha Kok Estate

Sha Kok Estate (Chinese: 沙角邨) is located near Pok Hong Estate, Jat Min Chuen and Sha Tin Wai station.

The blocks in the estate are named after birds.

Name	Type	Completion
Skylark House	Triple H	1981
Herring Gull House	Triple H	1981
Oriole House	Old Slab	1982
Bean Goose House	Old Slab	1982
Sand Martin House	Old Slab	1980
Green Heron House	Old Slab	1980
Osprey House	Old Slab	1980

The Hong Kong Academy for Gifted Education (HKAGE) moved in 2012 into the former Sha Kok Primary School in Sha Kok Estate, sharing the same building with Hong Kong Education City. It is located next to Buddhist Kok Kwong Secondary School.

=== Shui Chuen O Estate ===
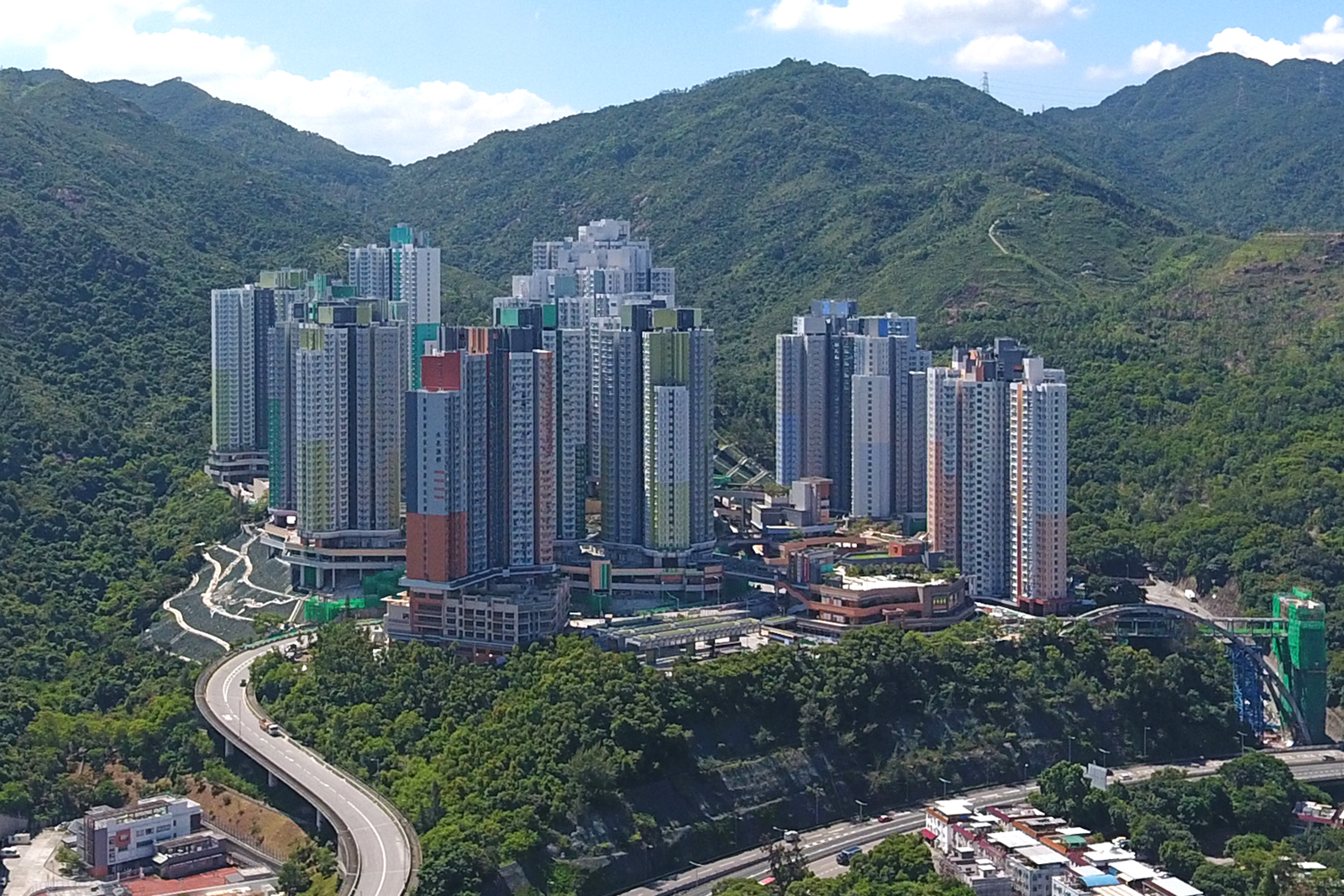
Shui Chuen O Estate bordering Lion Rock Country Park and Ma On Shan Country Park

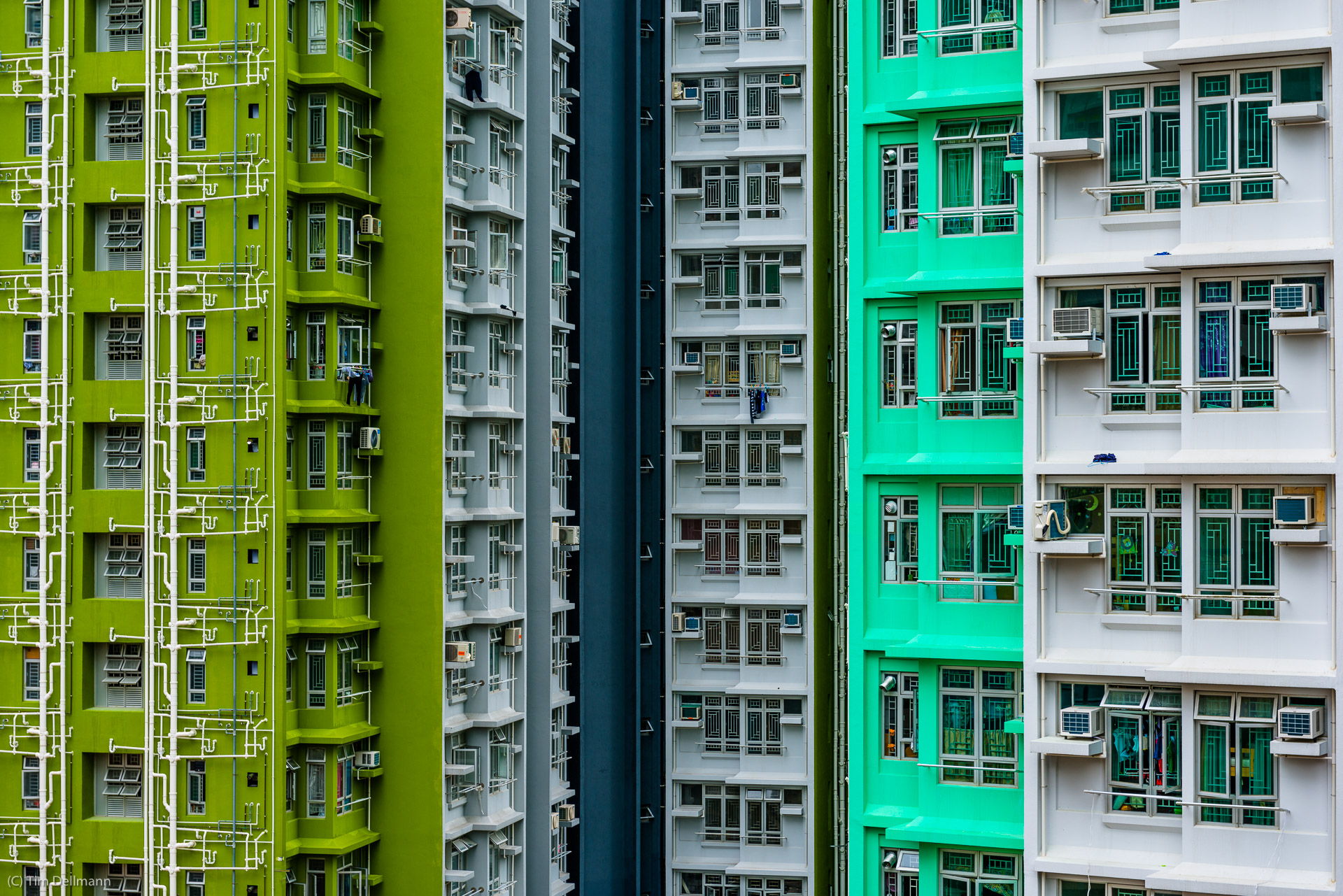
Shui Chen O Estate, Shatin (Hong Kong)

Shui Chuen O Estate comprises 18 blocks opened between 2015 and 2017, offering 11,123 public rental flats. It also includes a commercial complex with 59 shops and an indoor market. The new estate sits on a hillside and will be connected to the lower-lying areas by footbridges and lift towers, providing easy access to Pok Hong Estate and Sha Tin Wai station.

English name	Chinese name	Type	Phase	Completion
Ching Chuen House	清泉樓	Non-standard (Y-shaped)	1	2014
Long Chuen House	朗泉樓	Non-standard (Y-shaped)	1	2014
Yan Chuen House	欣泉樓	Non-standard (Y-shaped)	1	2014
Hei Chuen House	喜泉樓	Non-standard (Y-shaped)	1	2014
Shing Chuen House	城泉樓	Non-standard (Y-shaped)	2	2015
Ho Chuen House	河泉樓	Non-standard (Y-shaped)	2	2015
Ming Chuen House	明泉樓	Non-standard (Y-shaped)	2	2015
Mau Chuen House	茂泉樓	Non-standard (Y-shaped)	3	2015
Lam Chuen House	林泉樓	Non-standard (Y-shaped)	3	2015
Shou Chuen House	修泉樓	Non-standard (Y-shaped)	3	2015
Chuk Chuen House	竹泉樓	Non-standard (Y-shaped)	3	2015
Sung Chuen House	崇泉樓	Non-standard (Y-shaped)	4	2015
Ling Chuen House	嶺泉樓	Non-standard (Y-shaped)	4	2015
Lok Chuen House	樂泉樓	Non-standard (cross-shaped)	1	2014
Yuet Chuen House	月泉樓	Non-standard (cross-shaped)	2	2015
Ying Chuen House	映泉樓	Non-standard (cross-shaped)	2	2015
Shan Chuen House	山泉樓	Non-standard (cross-shaped)	4	2015
Tsun Chuen House	峻泉樓	Non-standard (cross-shaped)	4	2015

=== Wo Che Estate ===
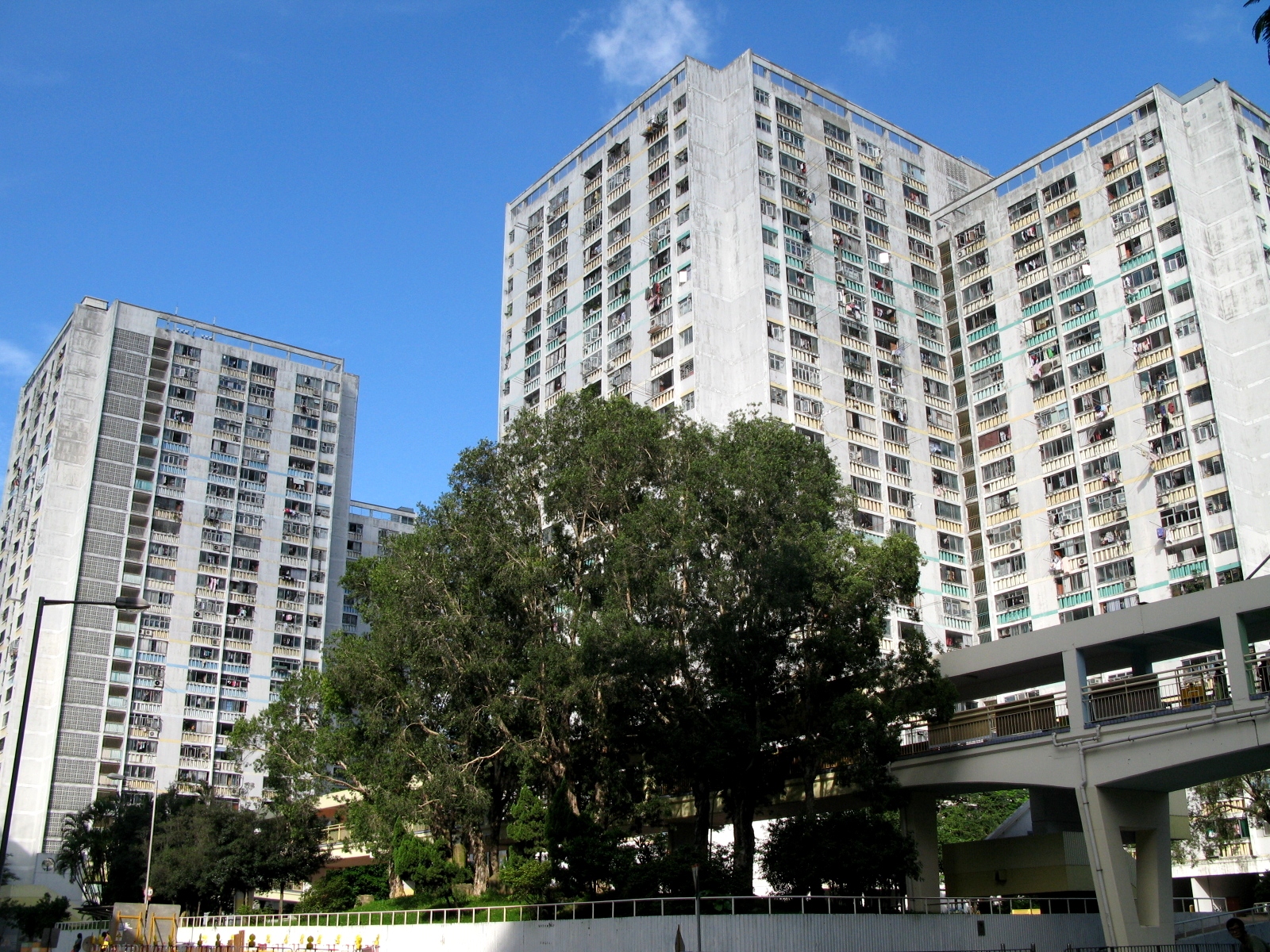
Twin Tower buildings in Wo Che Estate.

Wo Che Estate (Chinese: 禾輋邨) is the second public housing estate in Sha Tin, after Lek Yuen Estate. Built on the reclaimed land of Sha Tin Hoi, the estate consists of 13 residential blocks completed in 1977, 1980 and 2003.

Name	Type	Completion
Hong Wo House	Twin Tower	1977
Fung Wo House	Twin Tower	1977
Shun Wo House	Twin Tower	1977
Man Wo House	Twin Tower	1980
Tai Wo House	Twin Tower	1980
Foo Wo House	Twin Tower	1980
Yan Wo House	Single H (Special Edition)	1980
Mei Wo House	Single H (Special Edition)	1980
Hip Wo House	Double H (Special Edition)	1980
Tak Wo House	Old Slab	1977
Hau Wo House	Old Slab	1978
Chi Wo House	Old Slab	1978
King Wo House	New Cruciform (Ver.1999)	2003

The 13th house in the estate, King Wo House, was originally the HOS house called "Fung Sui Court", but the Hong Kong Housing Authority decided to transfer it to rental house before it was occupied in 2003.

=== Kwong Yuen Estate, Kwong Lam Court and Hong Lam Court ===
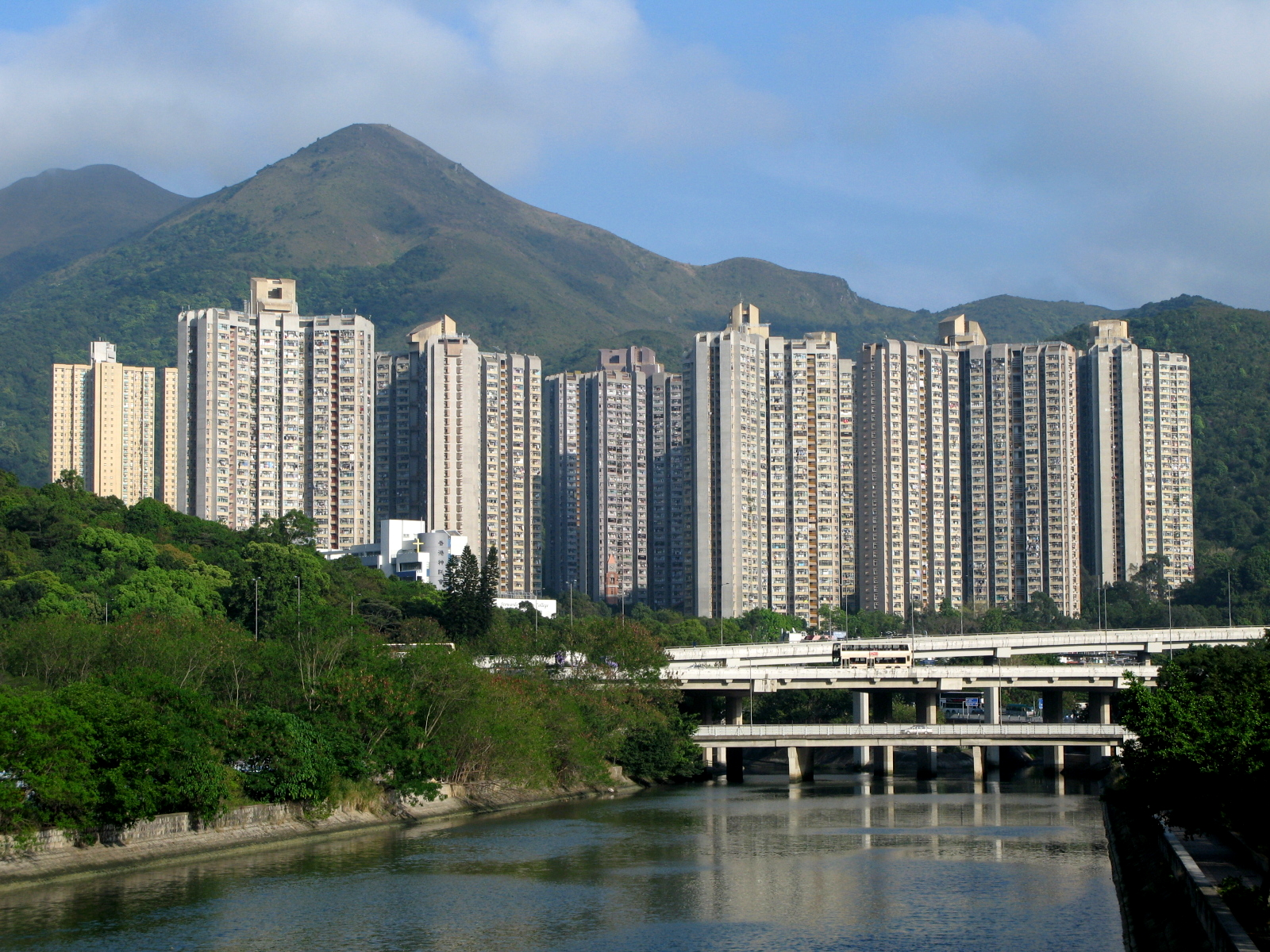
Kwong Yuen Estate

Kwong Yuen Estate (Chinese: 廣源邨) is a mixed public and TPS estate in Siu Lek Yuen. Unlike other public estates in Sha Tin, Kwong Yuen Estate is built on sloping platform, instead of reclaimed land. In 2001, some of the flats were sold to the tenants through Tenants Purchase Scheme Phase 4.

The Commercial Centre Complex of the estate was designed to merge into the village environment in the vicinity. Unlike the commercial centres of other public housing estates, the Complex consists of five two-level blocks which are standing on two platforms. The 26m clock tower of the Complex is to reinforce the image of the Commercial Centre. In 1992, the design of the commercial centre won a Certificate of Merit in the annual design competition which was organized by The Hong Kong Institute of Architects.

Name	Type	Completion
Pine House	Trident 4	1989
Oak House	Trident 4	1989
Banyan House	Trident 4	1989
Cypress House	Trident 4	1989
Kapok House	Trident 3	1989
Alder House	Trident 3	1989

=== Shek Mun Estate ===
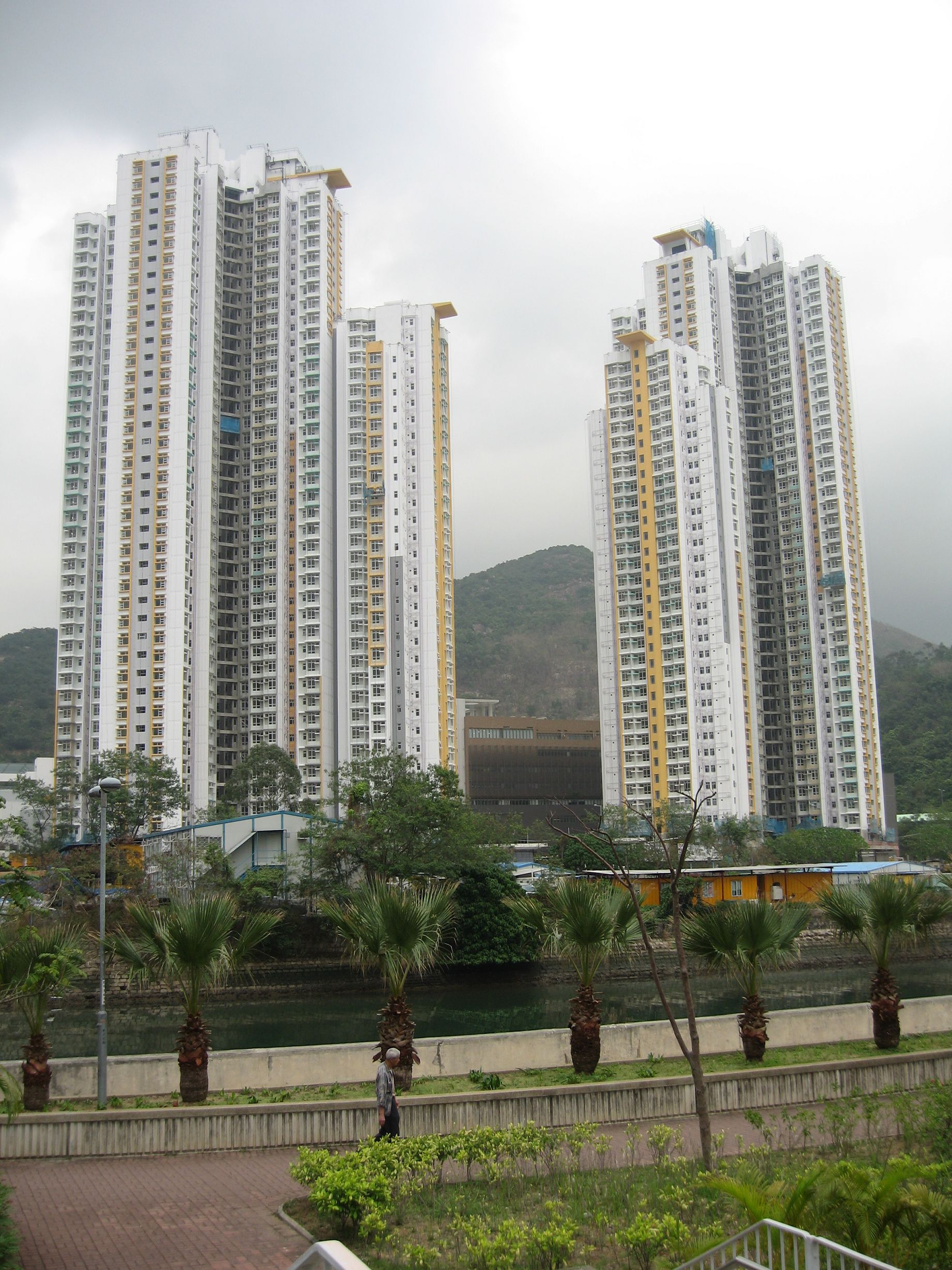
Shek Mun Estate

Shek Mun Estate (Chinese: 碩門邨) is a public housing estate built on reclaimed land in Shek Mun, Sha Tin, near the MTR Shek Mun station. It consists of six residential buildings completed in 2009 and 2019 respectively.

A second phase, comprising four more blocks, started construction in 2015. This phase occupies a 2.25 ha site across the road from the existing estate and also includes a commercial centre, a welfare block, a kindergarten, a car park, and public space.

Name	Type	Completion
Kin Shek House	New Harmony 1	2009
Mei Shek House	New Harmony 1	2009
Fung Shek House	Non-standard (T-shaped)	2019
Sun Shek House	Non-standard (T-shaped)	2019
Shui Shek House	Non-standard (T-shaped)	2019
Hei Shek House	Non-standard (T-shaped)	2019

=== Jat Min Chuen ===
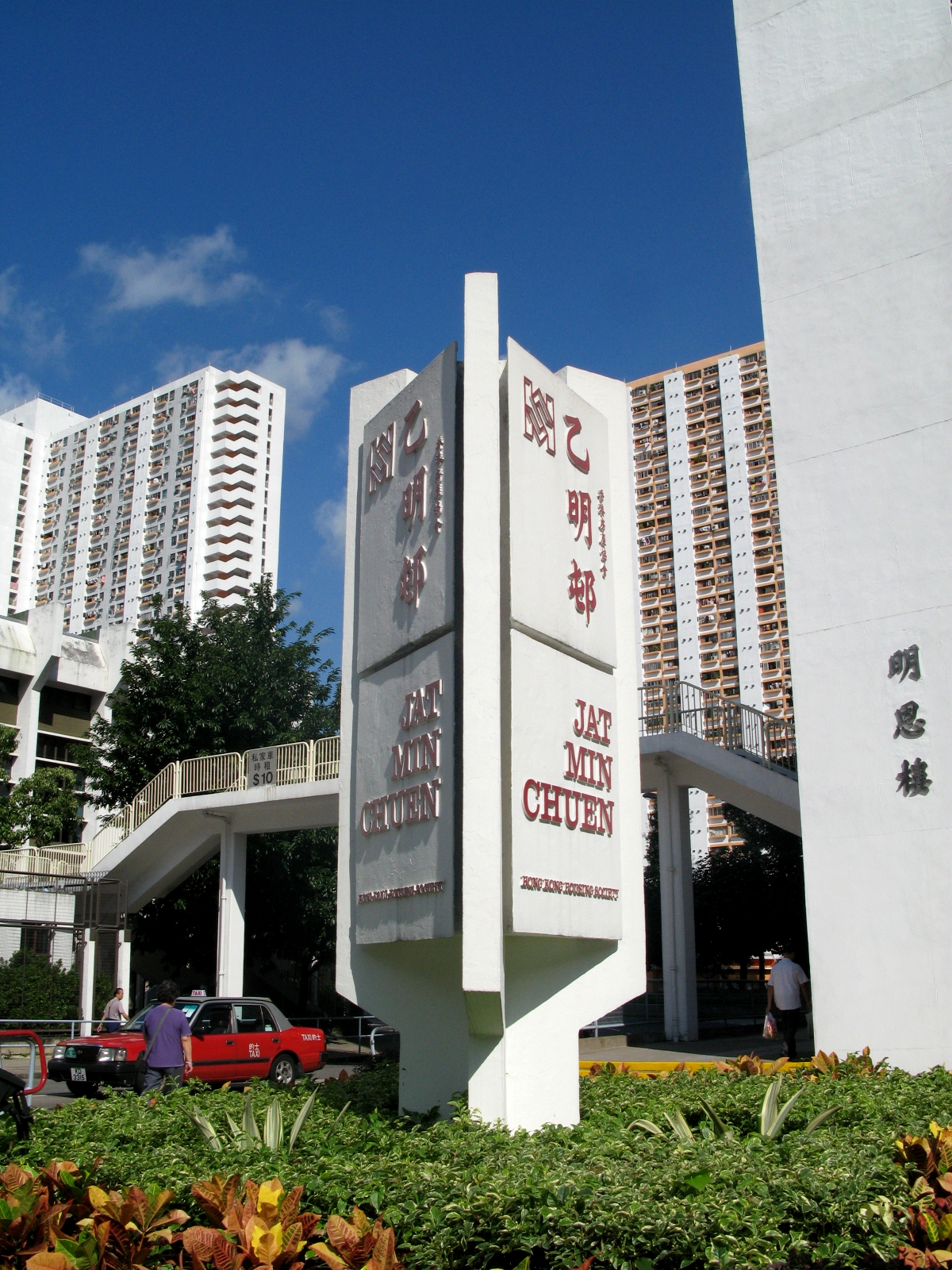
Sign of Jat Min Chuen

Jat Min Chuen (Chinese: 乙明邨) is one of the few estates located within Sha Tin that is developed by the Hong Kong Housing Society. It consists of three residential buildings completed in 1981 and 2024 . It was named for Mr. Tan Jat Ming (陳乙明), the former honorary treasurer of the Society.

Unlike other estates, the Hong Kong Housing Society financed the construct of Jat Min Chuen using a bank loan at a high interest rate, rather than from the Government. Therefore, the rent in the estate was forced to be put up as the Society needed to return money to banks afterwards.

=== Greenhill Villa ===
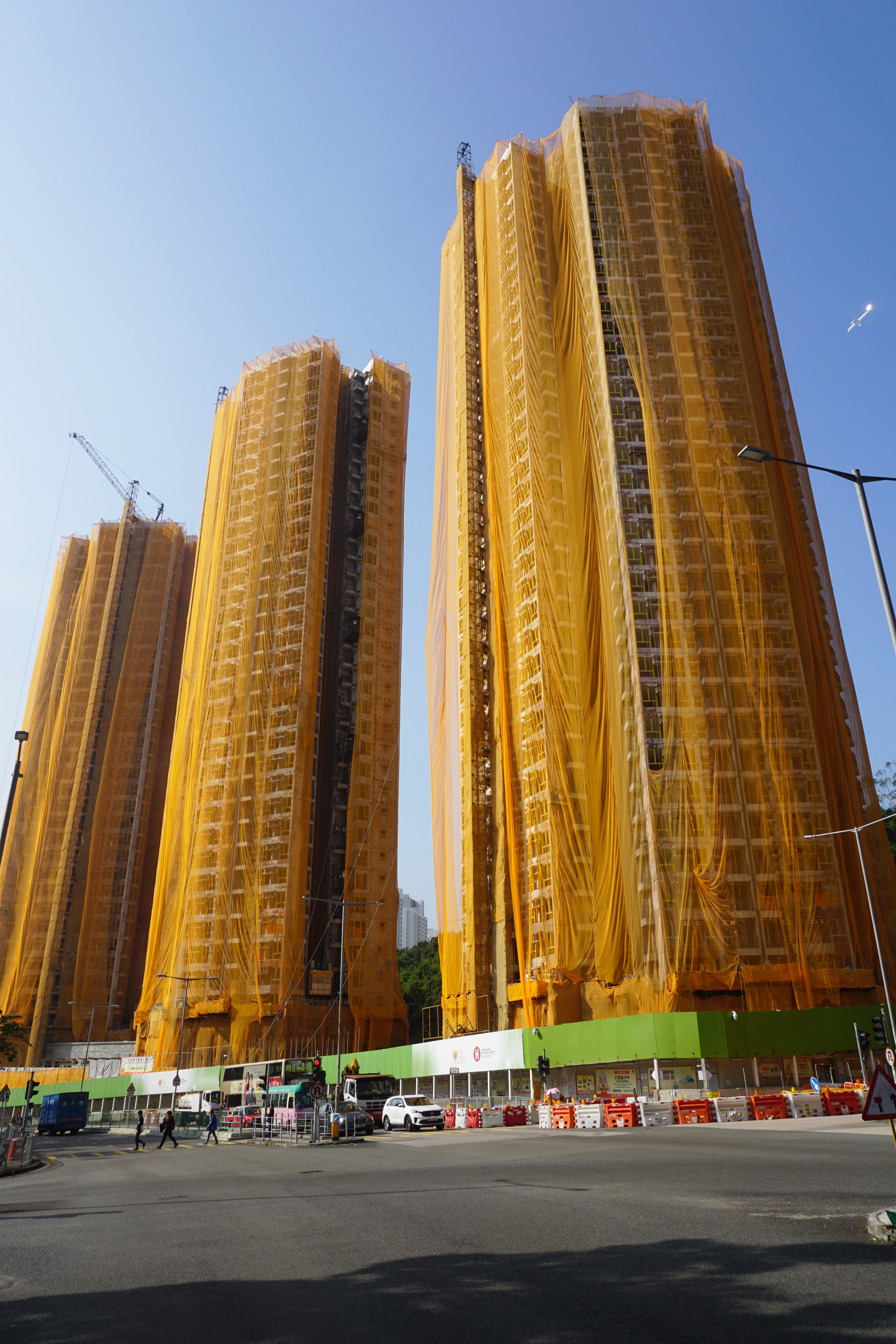
Greenhill Villa

Greenhill Villa (Chinese: 綠怡雅苑) is a Subsidised Sale Flats Project court developed by Hong Kong Housing Society and constructed by Chun Wo Construction, located at Siu Lek Yuen of Sha Tin District. It comprises three 35 to 38-storey towers providing 1,020 small and medium-sized flats. It was launched for pre-sale in February 2016 and completed in 2019.

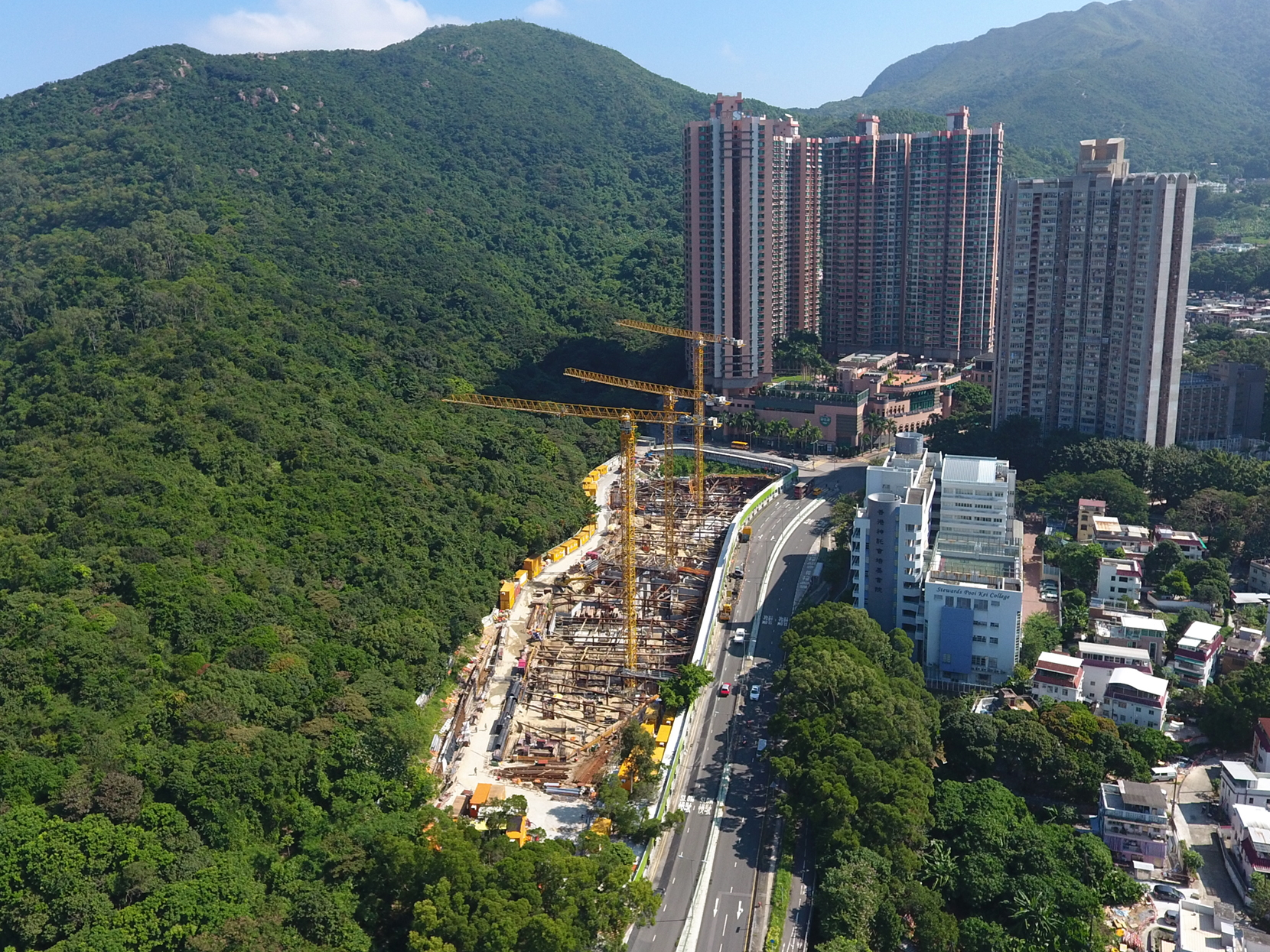
Greenhill Villa in November 2016

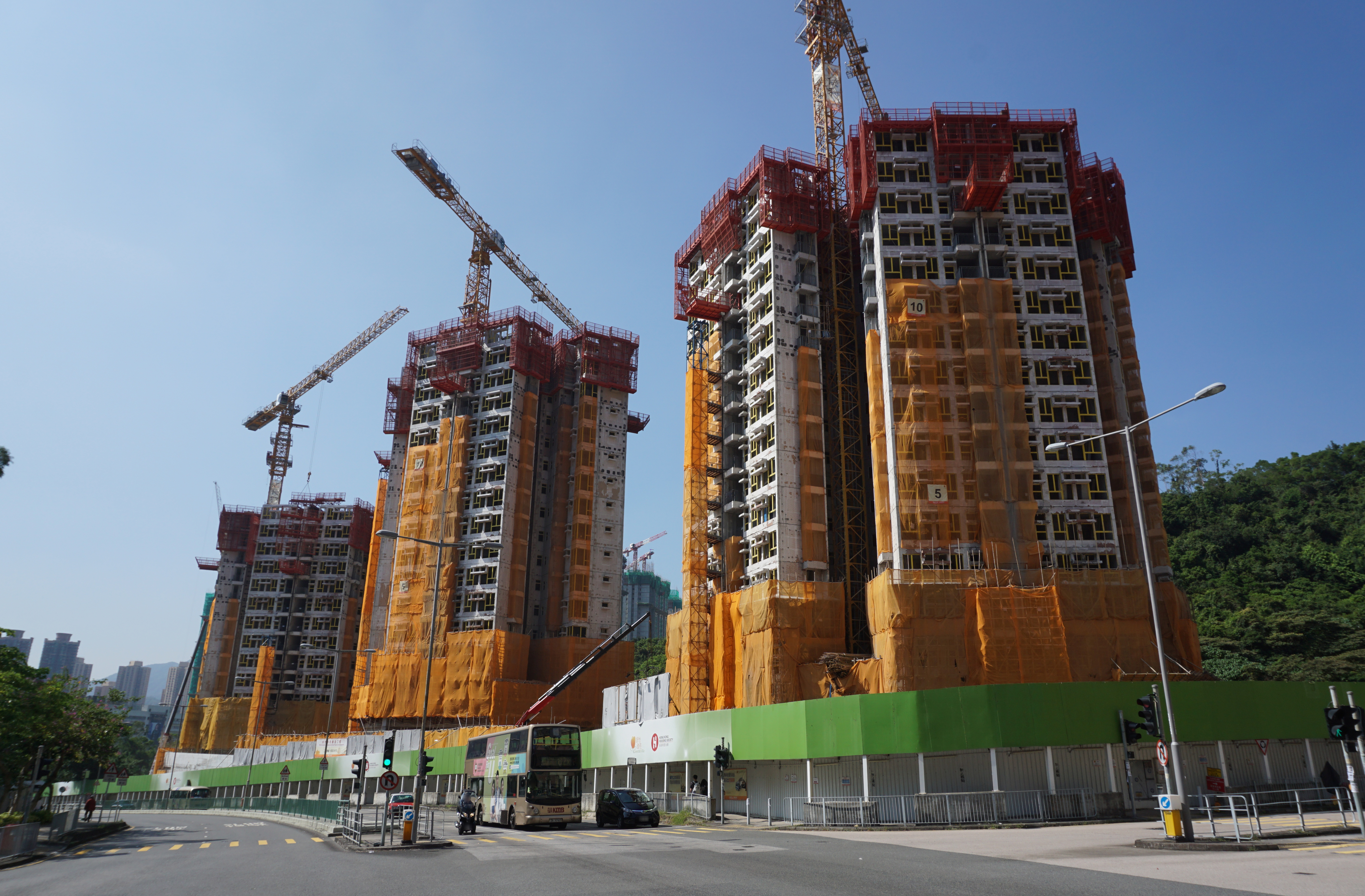
Greenhill Villa in October 2017

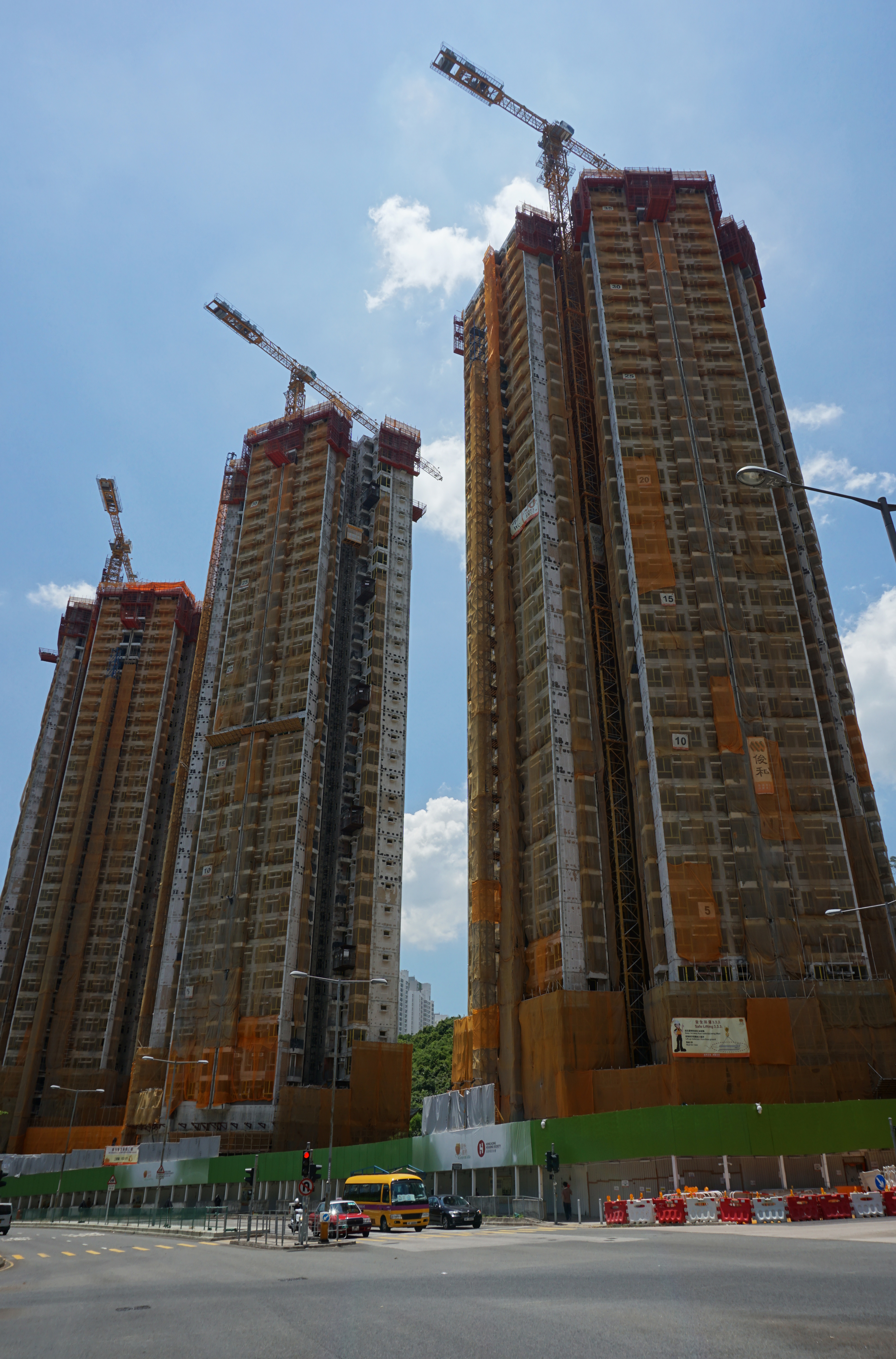
Greenhill Villa in May 2018

House name	Type	Completion
Block 1	Designed by architect	2019
Block 2	Designed by architect	2019
Block 3	Designed by architect	2019

=== Sunshine Grove ===
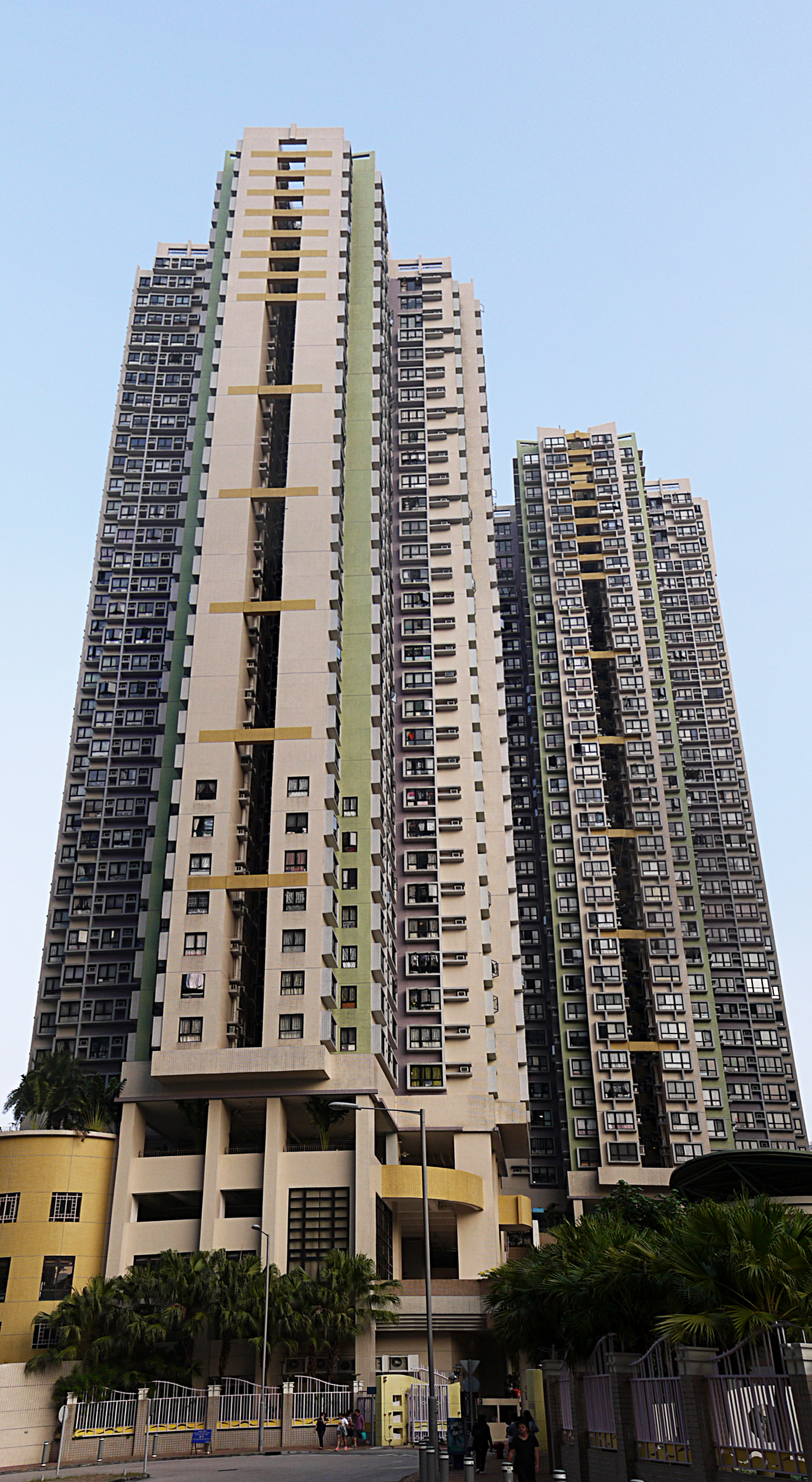
Sunshine Grove

Sunshine Grove (Chinese: 晴碧花園) is a Sandwich Class Housing Scheme court in Yuen Chau Kok, Sha Tin, near City One Shatin and MTR City One station. It is developed by the Hong Kong Housing Society and consists of two blocks built in 1999.

=== Yu Chui Court ===
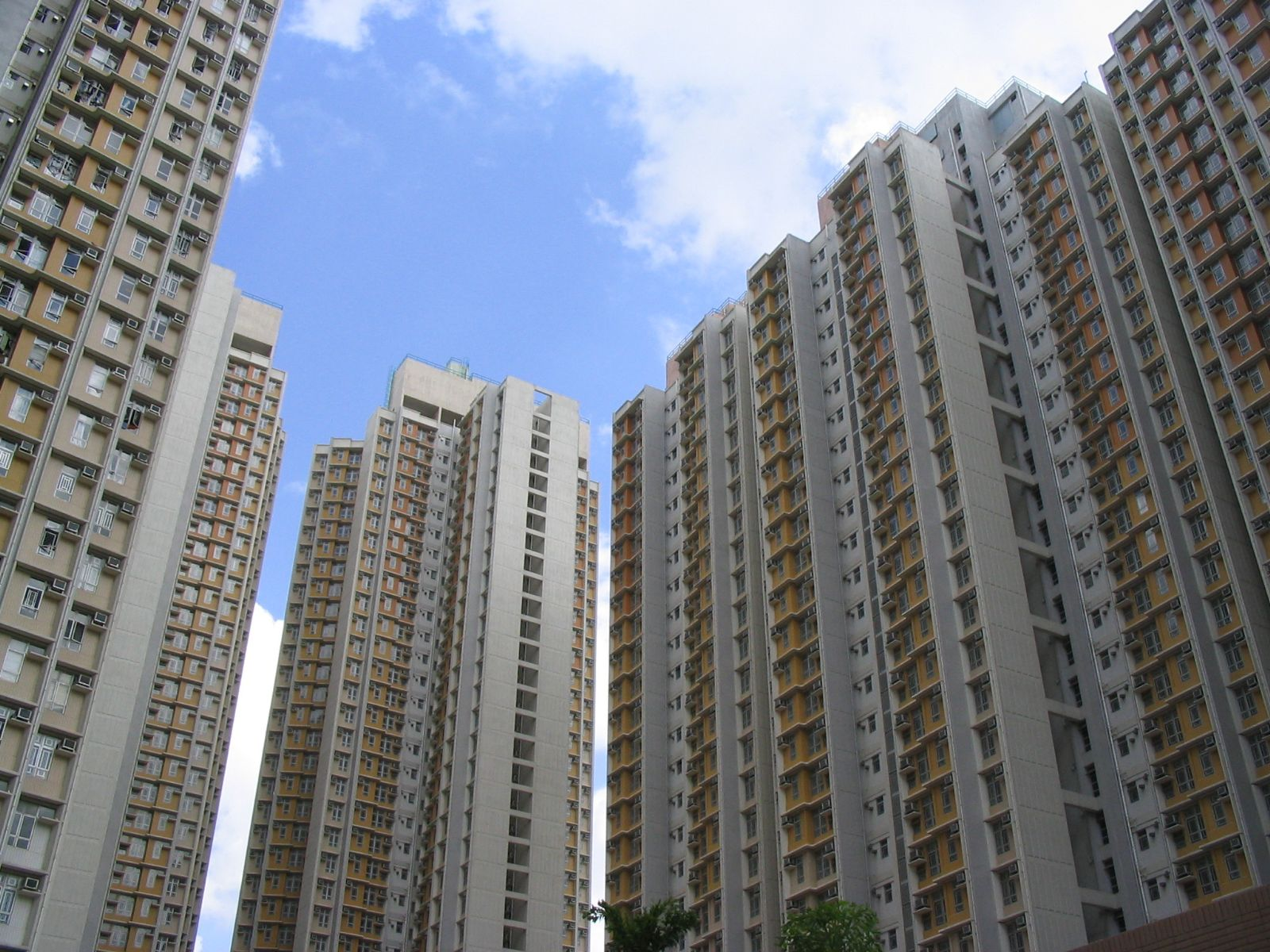
Yu Chui Court

Yu Chui Court (Chinese: 愉翠苑) is a HOS court in Yuen Chau Kok, Sha Tin, near MTR City One station. Built on the reclaimed land of Sha Tin Hoi, it consists of 16 blocks (except the 2 demolished blocks) built in 2001.

In 2000, Block E and D of the court was found short-piling, in which only four of the 18 piles of the blocks could meet the specifications. Finally, the government decided to demolish the two blocks for safety reasons. The site was then reconstructed as a garden.

Name	Type	Completion
Yu Fun House	Concord 1	2001
Yu Yan House	Concord 1	2001
Yu Moon House	Concord 1	2001
Yu Sin House	Concord 2	2001
Yu Yeung House	Concord 2	2001
Yu Chai House	Concord 2	2001
Yu Kui House	Concord 1	2001
Yu Ting House	Concord 1	2001
Yu Man House	Concord 1	2001
Yu Nang House	Single Aspect Concord	2001
Yu Yin House	Single Aspect Concord	2001
Yu Lai House	Single Aspect Concord	2001
Yu Chung House	Single Aspect Concord	2001
Yu Lim House	Single Aspect Concord	2001
Yu Ching House	Single Aspect Concord	2001
Yu Kan House	Single Aspect Concord	2001

=== Yue Tin Court ===
Yue Tin Court (Chinese: 愉田苑) is a HOS court in Yuen Chau Kok, Sha Tin, near City One Shatin and City One station. It has seven blocks built in 1982 and 1983 respectively.

Name	Type	Completion
Yue Sui House	Flexi 1	1982
Yue Wo House	Flexi 1	1982
Yue Kin House	Flexi 1	1982
Yue Chak House	Flexi 1	1982
Yue Yat House	Flexi 2	1983
Yue Yuet House	Flexi 2	1983
Yue Kwan House	Flexi 2	1983

=== Yue Shing Court ===
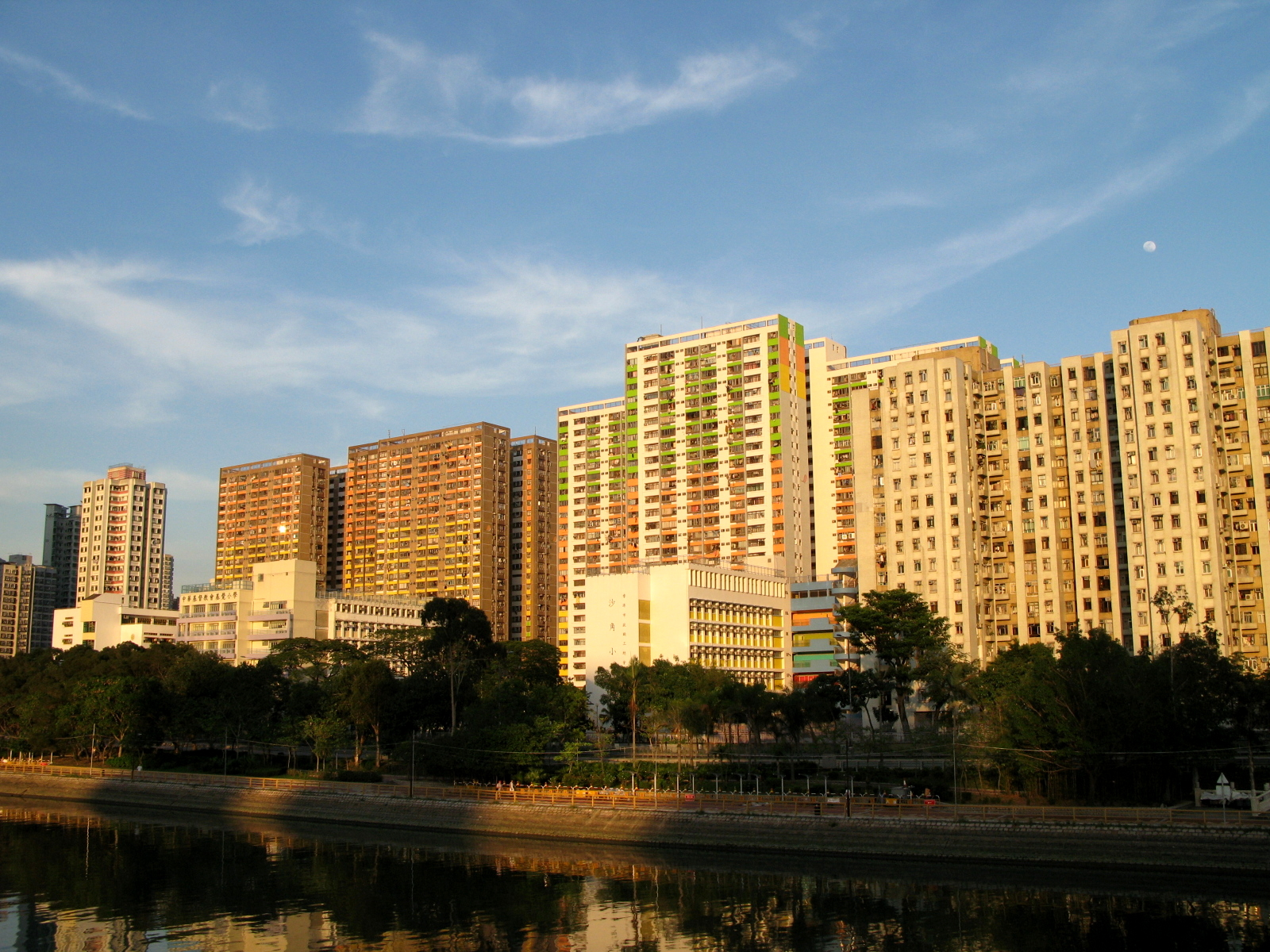
Yue Shing Court (right)

Yue Shing Court (Chinese: 愉城苑) is a HOS court in Sha Tin, near Sha Kok Estate and Jat Min Chuen. Built on reclaimed land of Sha Tin Hoi, the court consists of four blocks built in 1980.

Name	Type	Completion
Shing Yan House	Old-Cruciform	1980
Shing Wing House	Old-Cruciform	1980
Shing Cheung House	Old-Cruciform	1980
Shing Hong House	Old-Cruciform	1980

== See also ==
- Public housing in Hong Kong
- List of public housing estates in Hong Kong
