= Lek Yuen Estate =

Public housing estate in Sha Tin, Hong Kong

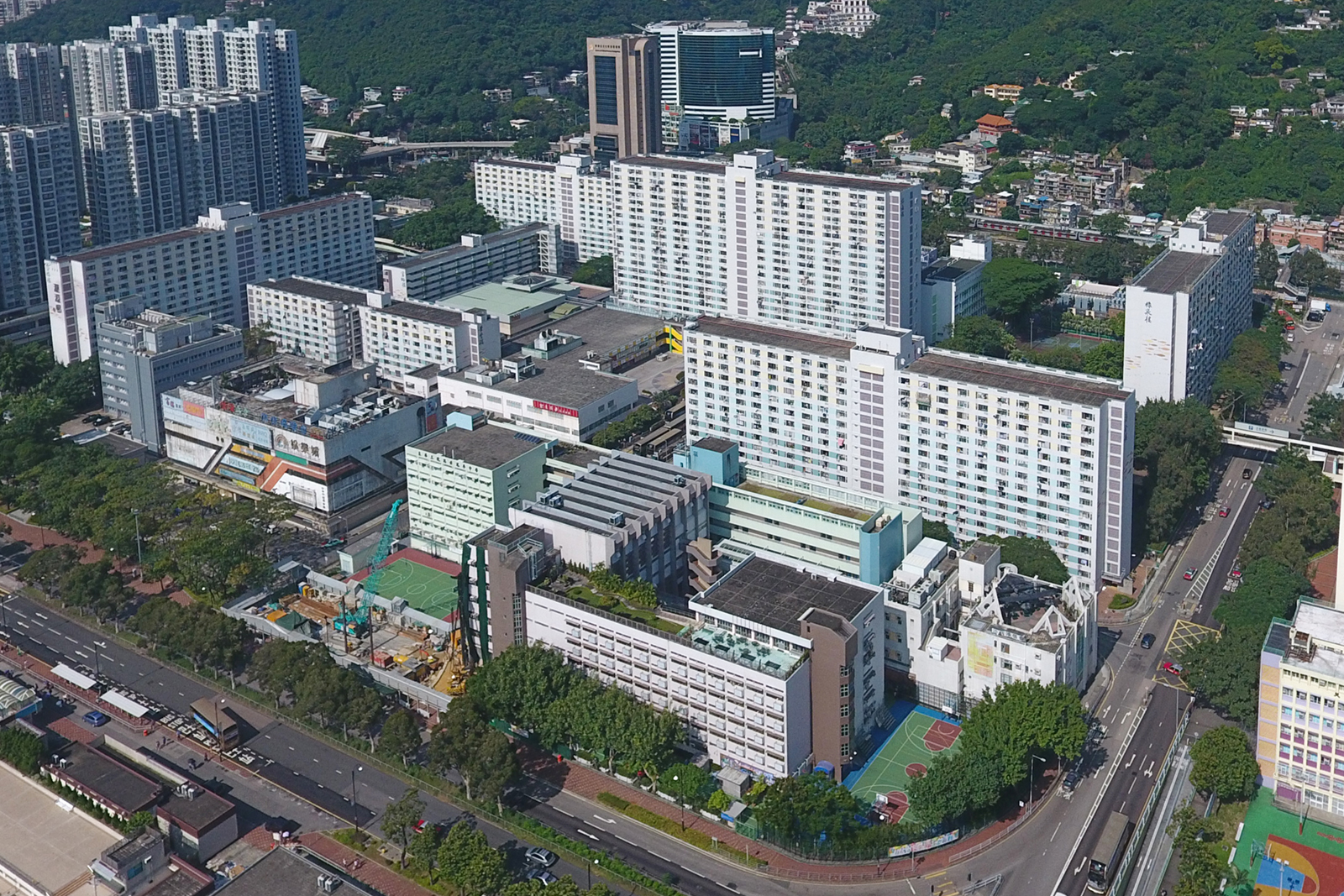
- Overview of Lek Yuen Estate
- Interactive map of Lek Yuen Estate

General information
- Location: 6 Lek Yuen Street, Sha Tin; New Territories, Hong Kong
- Coordinates: 22.385053°N 114.192115°E
- Status: Completed
- Category: Public rental housing
- Population: 8,131 (2016)
- No. of blocks: 7
- No. of units: 3,219

Construction
- Constructed: 1975; 51 years ago
- Authority: Hong Kong Housing Authority

Lek Yuen Estate (Chinese: 瀝源邨) is a public housing estate in Sha Tin, New Territories, Hong Kong. It is the first public housing estate in Sha Tin, built on the reclaimed land of Sha Tin Hoi, located near Wo Che Estate and MTR Sha Tin station. The estate consists of seven residential blocks completed in 1975.

== History ==
Lek Yuen Estate was one of the first of a "new generation" of estates which were more self-contained with regard to the provision of amenities and shopping. Covered walkways allow tenants to do their shopping close to home, without relying on cars or trains. This is now a standard element of housing estate design in Hong Kong. When the old Sha Tin market was being demolished, many merchants were relocated to the Lek Yuen Estate shops, though some complained of comparatively "exorbitant" rents.

The shopping centre is now owned by The Link REIT. The estate locality has several other facilities including a market, a park, a public clinic, an entertainment building called "Sha Tin Fun City" (沙田娛樂城), and numerous schools. An elevated walkway runs through the estate, linking it to Sha Tin Town Centre (to the south) and Wo Che Estate (to the north).

On 24 September 2020, a man was found dead at the estate after a fire broke out on the fourth floor of Wing Shui House.

== Houses ==
Name	Chinese name	Building type	Completed
Wing Shui House	榮瑞樓	Old Slab	1975
Wah Fung House	華豐樓	Old Slab	1975
Fu Yu House	富裕樓	Old Slab	1975
Kwai Wo House	貴和樓	Old Slab	1975
Fook Hoi House	福海樓	Old Slab	1975
Luk Chuen House	祿泉樓	Old Slab	1975
Sau Chuen House	壽全樓	Old Slab	1975

== Demographics ==
According to the 2016 by-census, Lek Yuen Estate had a population of 8,131. The median age was 50.5 and the majority of residents (98.6 per cent) were of Chinese ethnicity. The average household size was 2.6 people. The median monthly household income of all households (i.e. including both economically active and inactive households) was HK$20,000.

== Politics ==
Lek Yuen Estate is located in Lek Yuen constituency of the Sha Tin District Council. It is currently represented by Jimmy Sham Tsz-kit, who was elected in the 2019 elections.

== Facilities ==
Hong Kong Public Libraries operates the Lek Yuen Public Library in Kwai Wo House, Lek Yuen Estate.

== COVID-19 pandemic ==
Some residents in Luk Chuen House at the Estate in June 2020, where confirmed cases were found.

== See also ==
- Public housing estates in Sha Tin
