= Lek Yuen (constituency) =

Constituency of the Sha Tin District Council of Hong Kong

- Elected constituency for the Sha Tin District Council
- Boundary of Lek Yuen in Sha Tin District
- District: Sha Tin
- Legislative Council constituency: New Territories North East
- Population: 15,959 (2019)
- Electorate: 8,545 (2019)

Current constituency
- Created: 1994
- Number of members: One
- Member: Vacant

Lek Yuen (Chinese: 瀝源) is one of the 36 constituencies in the Sha Tin District of Hong Kong.

The constituency returns one district councillor to the Sha Tin District Council, with an election every four years. The seat was last held by Jimmy Sham of the League of Social Democrats.

Lek Yuen constituency is loosely based on Lek Yuen Estate with an estimated population of 15,959.

== Councillors represented ==
Election	Member	Party
1994	Tony Kan Chung-nin	Liberal
199?	Tony Kan Chung-nin	Independent
2011	Michael Wong Yue-hon	Civil Force
2014	Michael Wong Yue-hon	NPP/CF
2018	Michael Wong Yue-hon	Civil Force
2019	Jimmy Sham Tsz-kit→Vacant (Note: Resigned on 8 July 2021 after being arrested under national security law.)	LSD

== Election results ==
=== 2010s ===
Sha Tin District Council Election, 2019: Lek Yuen
Party	Candidate	Votes	%	±%
LSD	Jimmy Sham Tsz-kit	3,283	57.33	+13.43
Civil Force	Michael Wong Yue-hon	2,443	42.67	−13.43
Majority		840	14.66	
Turnout		5,759	67.41	
LSD gain from Civil Force		Swing		

Sha Tin District Council Election, 2015: Lek Yuen
Party	Candidate	Votes	%	±%
Civil Force (NPP)	Michael Wong Yue-hon	1,799	56.1	–2.6
LSD	Raphael Wong Ho-ming	1,406	43.9	+2.6
Majority		363	12.3	–5.4
Turnout		3,248	42.5	
Civil Force hold		Swing	–2.6	

Sha Tin District Council Election, 2011: Lek Yuen
Party	Candidate	Votes	%	±%
Civil Force	Michael Wong Yue-hon	1,382	58.83	
LSD	Raphael Wong Ho-ming	967	41.17	
Majority		415	17.67	
Civil Force gain from Independent		Swing		

=== 2000s ===
Sha Tin District Council Election, 2007: Lek Yuen
Party	Candidate	Votes	%	±%
Independent	Tony Kan Chung-nin	1,604	64.42	
Civic	Fiona Nam Hoi-yan	841	33.78	
Independent	Lin Leung-ying	45	1.81	
Majority		763	30.64	
Independent hold		Swing		

Sha Tin District Council Election, 2003: Lek Yuen
Party	Candidate	Votes	%	±%
Independent	Tony Kan Chung-nin	Uncontested		
Independent hold		Swing		

=== 1990s ===
Sha Tin District Council Election, 1999: Lek Yuen
Party	Candidate	Votes	%	±%
Independent	Tony Kan Chung-nin	Uncontested		
Independent hold		Swing		

Sha Tin District Board Election, 1994: Lek Yuen
Party	Candidate	Votes	%	±%
Liberal	Tony Kan Chung-nin	1,768	73.76	
Independent	Lau Wai-ming	315	13.14	
Independent	Chan Yuet-hung	314	13.10	
Majority		1,453	60.62	
Liberal win (new seat)				
