= Tsang Tai Uk =

Coordinates: 22.3738°N 114.1906°E

Tsang Tai Uk 曾大屋
- Hakka walled village
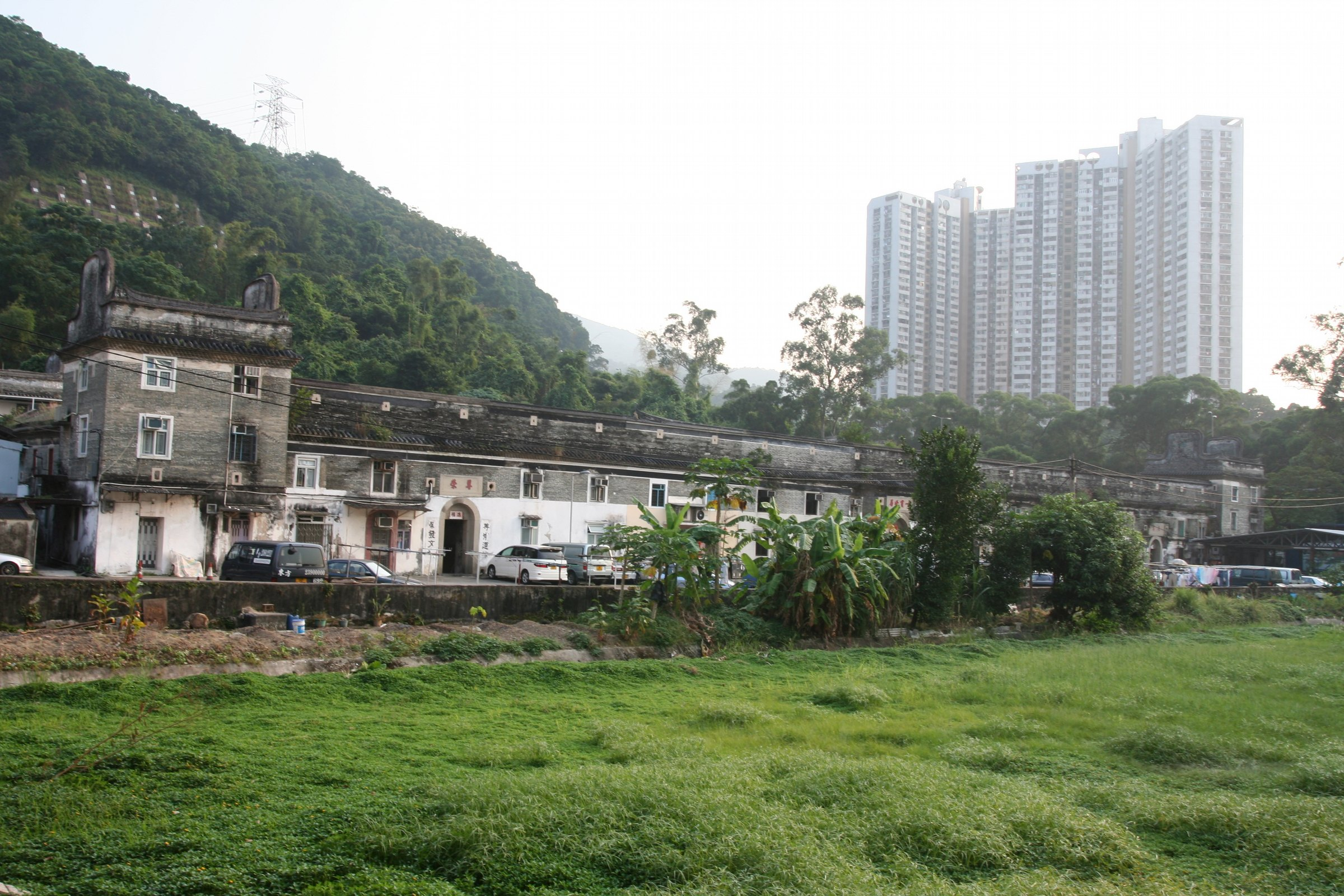
- External view of Tsang Tai Uk
- Interactive map of Tsang Tai Uk
- Country: China
- SAR: Hong Kong
- District: Sha Tin
- Established: 1847
- Founder: Tsang Koon-Man
- Elevation: 2.5 m (8.2 ft)

Tsang Tai Uk
- Traditional Chinese: 曾大屋
- Literal meaning: Big House of the Tsangs
Transcriptions
Yue: Cantonese
- Yale Romanization: Chàhng daaih ūk
- Jyutping: Cang5 daai6 uk1

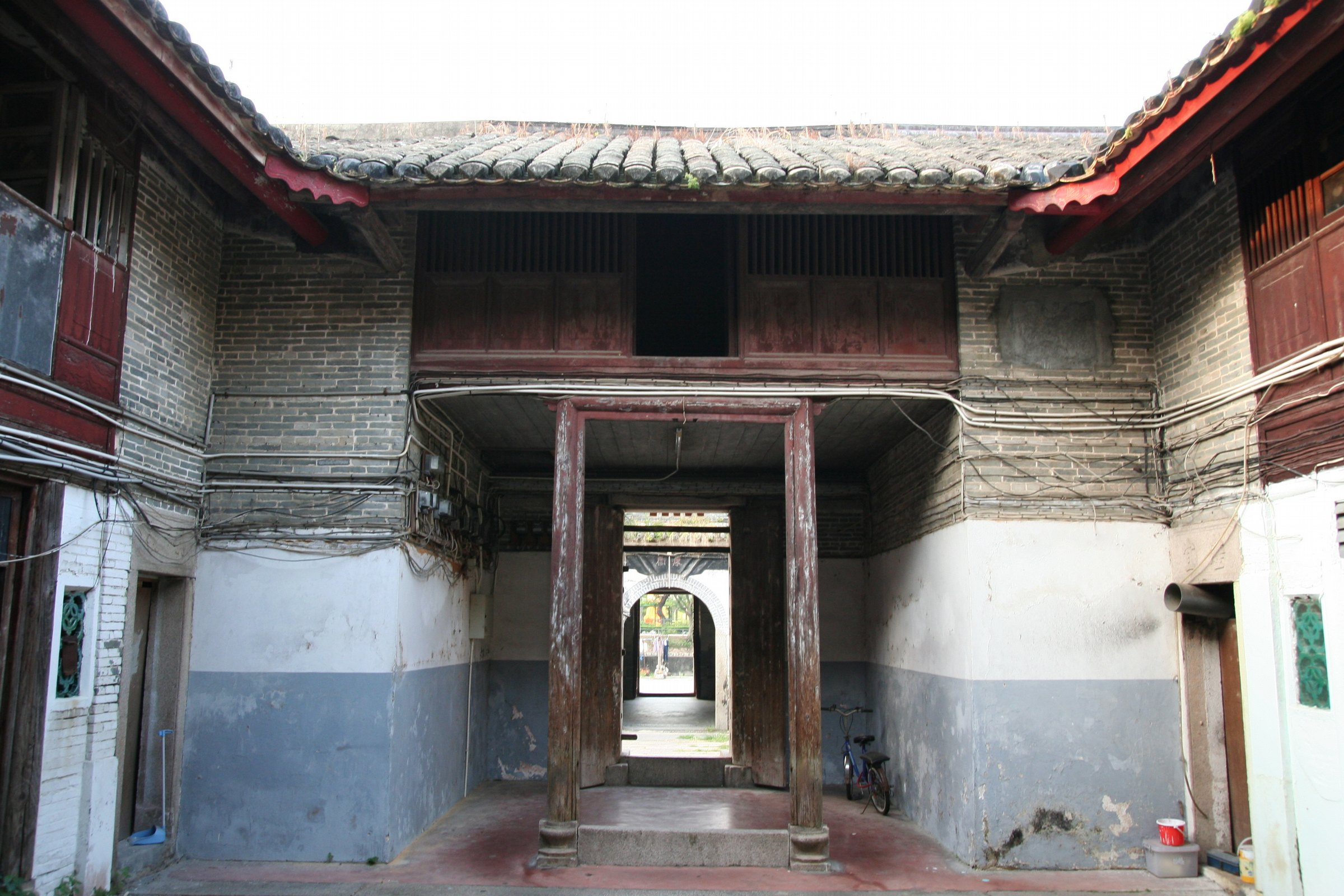
Inside Tsang Tai Uk

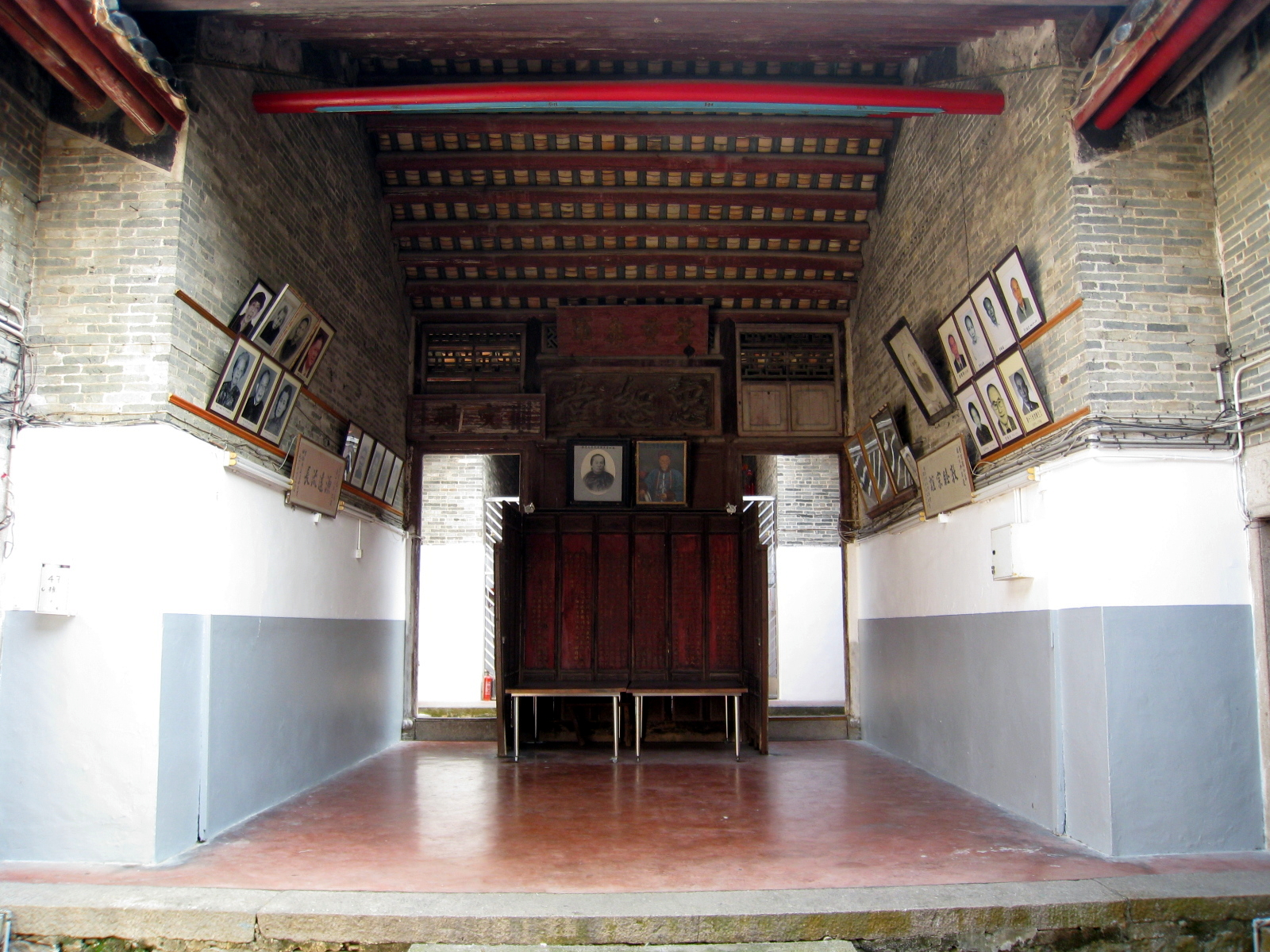
Ancestral hall of Tsang Tai Uk

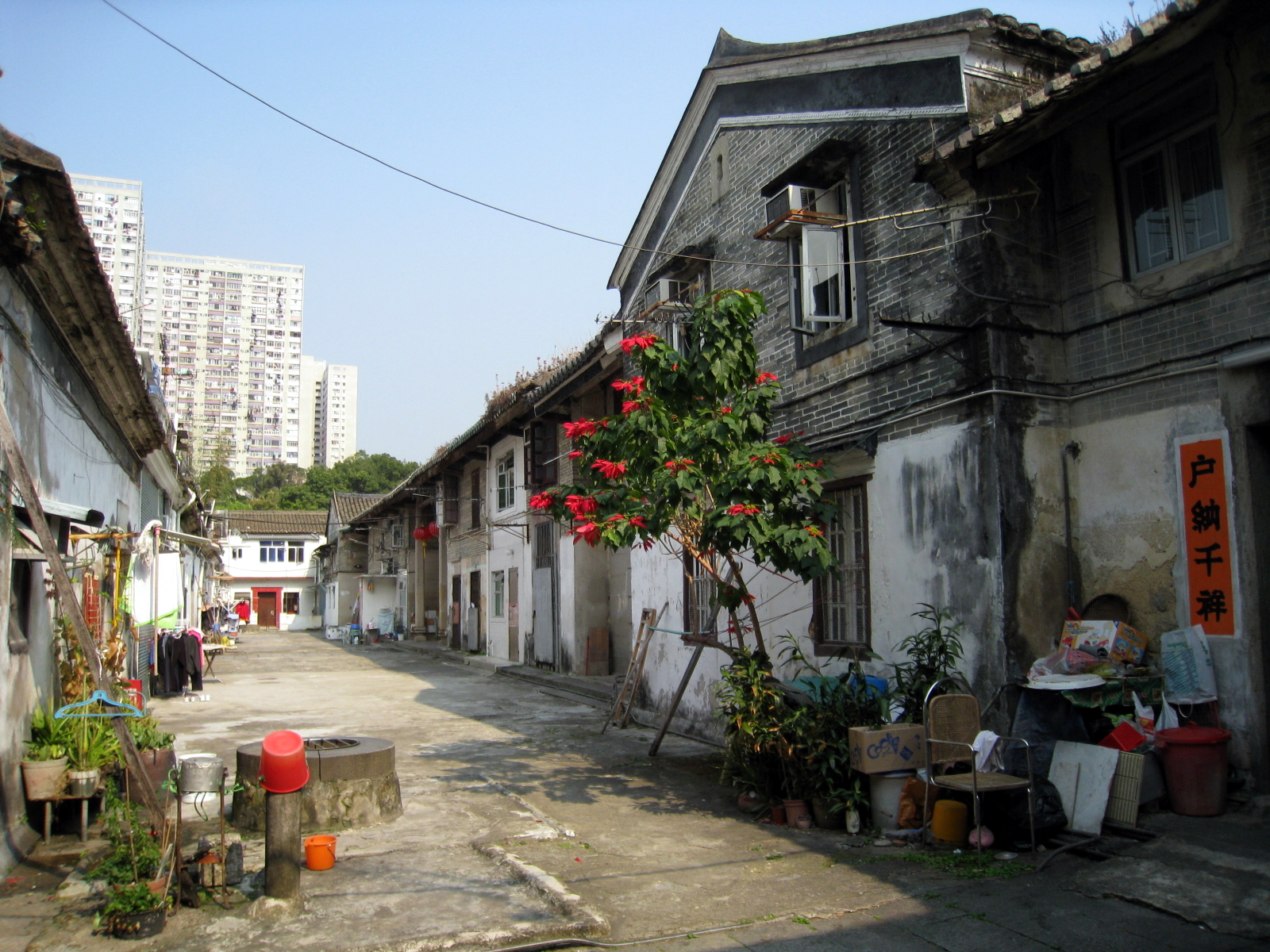
Main courtyard of Tsang Tai Uk

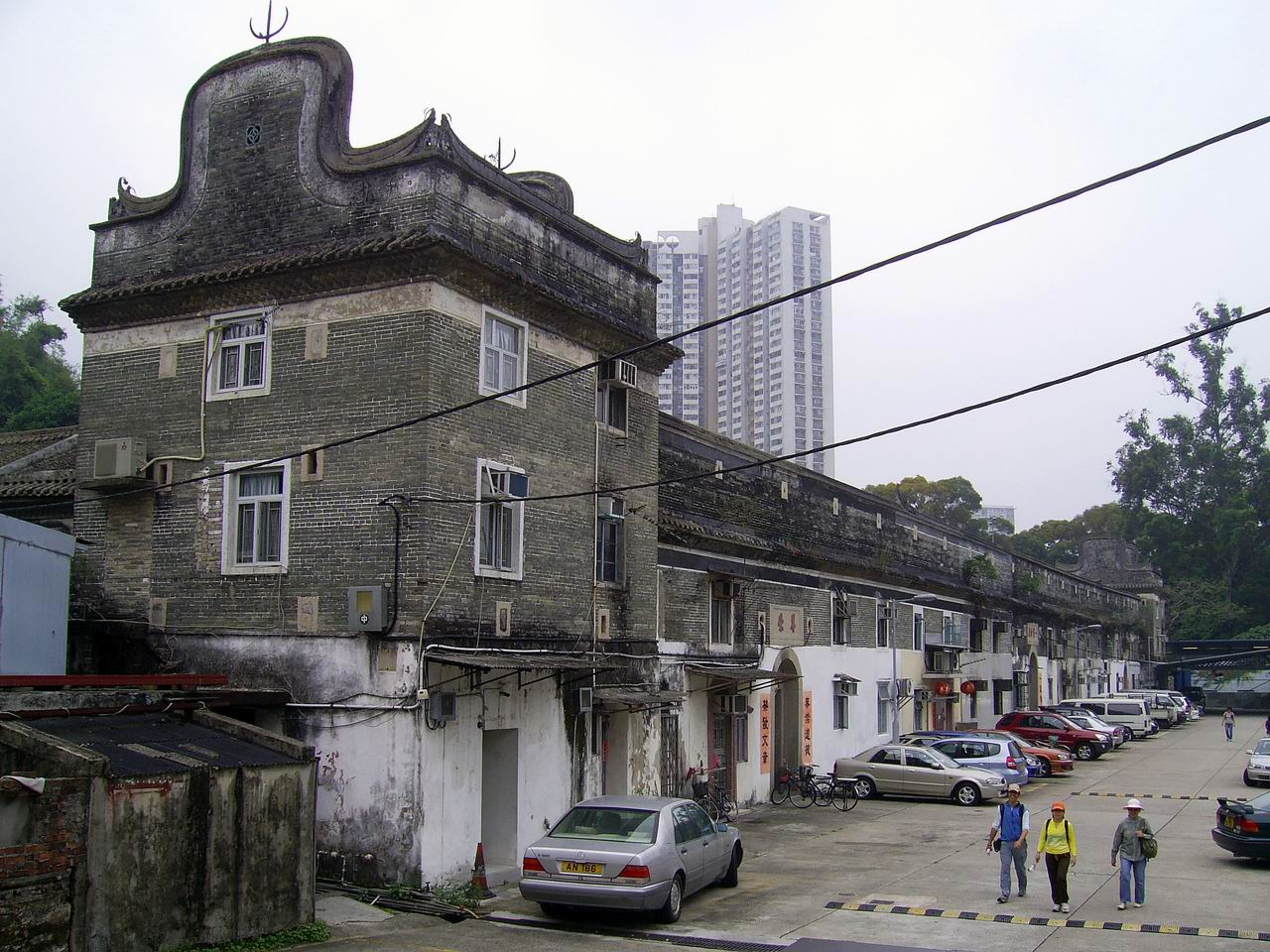
Corner tower of Tsang Tai Uk

Tsang Tai Uk, also known as Shan Ha Wai (山下圍; 'Walled Village at the Mountain's Foot'), is a Hakka walled village in Hong Kong, and one of the best preserved. The complex is located in Sha Tin close to the south of Pok Hong Estate, near Lion Rock Tunnel Road.

== Administration ==
Shan Ha Wai (Tsang Tai Uk) is a recognized village under the New Territories Small House Policy.

== History ==
The construction of Shan Ha Wai was begun in 1847 by the wealthy granite merchant and stonemason Tsang Koon-Man as a stronghold for the Tsang clan, and took around 20 years to complete. The founder situated his rural fortress so he could access his business ventures in the city reasonably. Also purchasing the best agricultural land in the surrounding valley alongside the village to afford a stable income when there were inevitable economic recessions. The high fortified walls and defensive gate offering protection protecting the families inside from the troubled times and night robberies of late-imperial China. The original granite, bricks and solid timber are still preserved today. The complex is rectangular and consists of three rows of houses enclosed by grey brick walls. The four corners each feature a three-story guard tower with openings in the wall through which guns could be fired back in the early days of the complex's role as a defensive fortification. All the houses are interlinked by passages and small courtyards. In the innermost row of houses is an ancestral hall where meetings and ceremonies took place. There are three arched entrances in the northern wall. The main or ceremonial entrance is in the middle and leads to the ancestral hall. In front of the main building is a massive courtyard, where villagers traditionally winnowed and dried their harvest. It also contained a study hall where the Tsang children were tutored before schools existed.

At the time of the 1911 census, the population of Shan Ha Wai was 56. The number of males was 24.

Shan Ha Wai gained its current name Tsang Tai Uk from locals when it housed displaced families after the Second World War.

During the 1970s development of the Sha Tin New Town, the surrounding area was developed significantly. During the course of new town development in Hong Kong, sometimes villages were relocated. However, Tsang Tai Uk was preserved due to its historical significance. In 1979, the village had about 700 residents, of whom about 300 belonged to the Tsang clan. Charles III, a former archaeology and history student, visited Tsang Tai Uk on 4 March 1979 during a royal tour.

The land reclaimed from Tide Cove upon which the Sha Tin New Town was built was formed to an average of five or six metres above sea level. However, Tsang Tai Uk is only 2.5 or three metres above sea level, and historically suffered from flooding. During Typhoon Wanda in 1962, the village was badly flooded, with the ground level having been completely inundated. In the late 1970s, the government devised a drainage improvement plan.

== Conservation ==
Tsang Tai Uk is listed as a Grade I historic building. Restoration work of the ancestral hall started in 2009, after a HK$ 1m Government grant on maintenance of privately owned graded historic buildings had been approved. Visitors are permitted in the first courtyard and ancestral hall; the remaining courtyards and buildings are private.

== Access ==
The closest MTR stations are Che Kung Temple and Sha Tin Wai.

== See also ==
- Kau Yeuk (Sha Tin)
- Mantang Wei (满堂围), in Shixing County of China
- Walled villages of Hong Kong
