= Sha Tin Wai station =

MTR station in the New Territories, Hong Kong

Sha Tin Wai 沙田圍
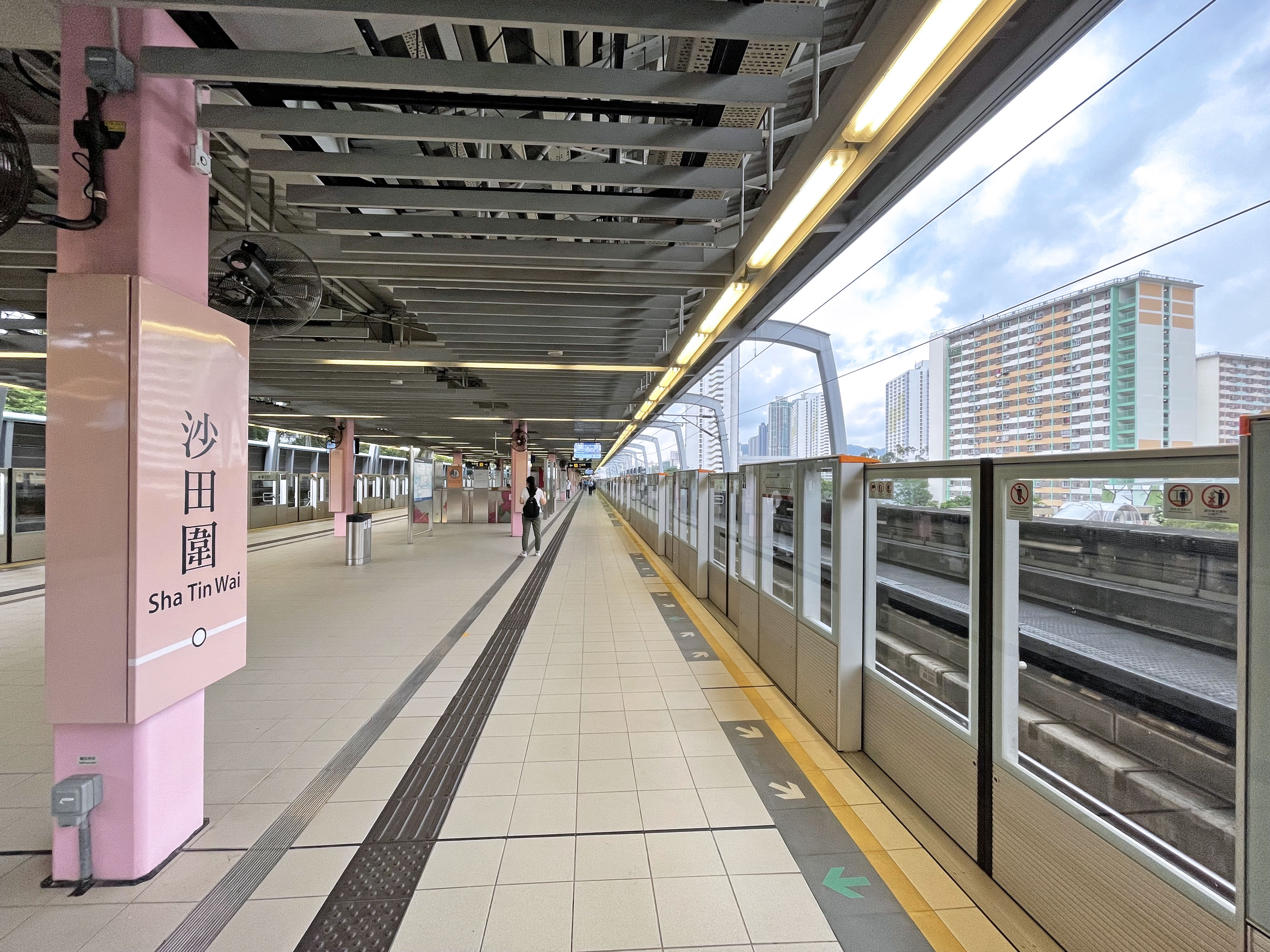
- Platform 1 of Sha Tin Wai station in July 2021

Chinese name
- Traditional Chinese: 沙田圍
- Simplified Chinese: 沙田围
- Cantonese Yale: Sātìnwài
- Literal meaning: Sandfield Walled Village
Transcriptions
Standard Mandarin
- Hanyu Pinyin: Shātiánwéi
Yue: Cantonese
- Yale Romanization: Sātìnwài

General information
- Location: Sha Tin Wai, Sha Tin District, Hong Kong
- Coordinates: 22°22′38″N 114°11′42″E
- System: MTR rapid transit station
- Owner: KCR Corporation
- Operator: MTR Corporation
- Line: Tuen Ma line
- Platforms: 2 (1 island platform)
- Tracks: 2
- Connections: Bus, minibus

Construction
- Structure type: Elevated
- Accessible: yes

Other information
- Station code: STW

History
- Opened: 21 December 2004; 21 years ago

Services
Preceding station	MTR	Following station
Che Kung Temple towards Tuen Mun	Tuen Ma line	City One towards Wu Kai Sha
Track layout
Location
- Location within MTR

Sha Tin Wai (Chinese: 沙田圍; Cantonese Yale: Sātìnwài) is a station on the Tuen Ma line in Sha Tin, Hong Kong. The name "Sha Tin Wai" comes from the village called Sha Tin Wai, which is located to the northeast of the station. It was provisionally called "Sha Kok Street" before the Ma On Shan line opened, because it is located at Sha Kok Street.

It serves residents living in Pok Hong Estate, Sha Kok Estate, Jat Min Chuen, Yue Shing Court, Shui Chuen O Estate, and also serves over 10 schools around the area, including kindergartens, primary schools and secondary schools, such as Po Leung Kuk Chee Jing Yin Primary School, The Church of Christ in China Kei Kok Primary School, Island School and Immaculate Heart of Mary College.

The pattern featured on the platform pillar and glass barrier is a shot of Tsang Tai Uk traditional walled settlement.

== History ==
On 21 December 2004, Sha Tin Wai station opened to the public with other KCR Ma On Shan Rail stations.

On 14 February 2020, the Ma On Shan line was extended south to a new terminus in Kai Tak, as part of the first phase of the Shatin to Central Link Project. The Ma On Shan Line was renamed Tuen Ma Line Phase 1 at the time. Sha Tin Wai station became an intermediate station on this temporary new line.

On 27 June 2021, the Tuen Ma line Phase 1 officially merged with the West Rail line in East Kowloon to form the new Tuen Ma line, as part of the Shatin to Central link project. Hence, Sha Tin Wai was included in the project and is now an intermediate station on the Tuen Ma line, Hong Kong's longest railway line.

== Station layout ==
P Platforms	Platform 1	← Tuen Ma line towards Tuen Mun (Che Kung Temple)
P Platforms	Island platform, doors will open on the left
P Platforms	Platform 2	Tuen Ma line towards Wu Kai Sha (City One) →
C	Concourse	Exits
C	Concourse	Customer services, toilets, MTRShops

Platforms 1 and 2 share the same island platform.

=== Exits ===
There are four exits to Sha Tin Wai station.

- A: Jat Min Chuen
- B: Pok Hong Estate
- C: Sha Kok Estate
- D: Sha Tin Wai, Shui Chuen O Estate
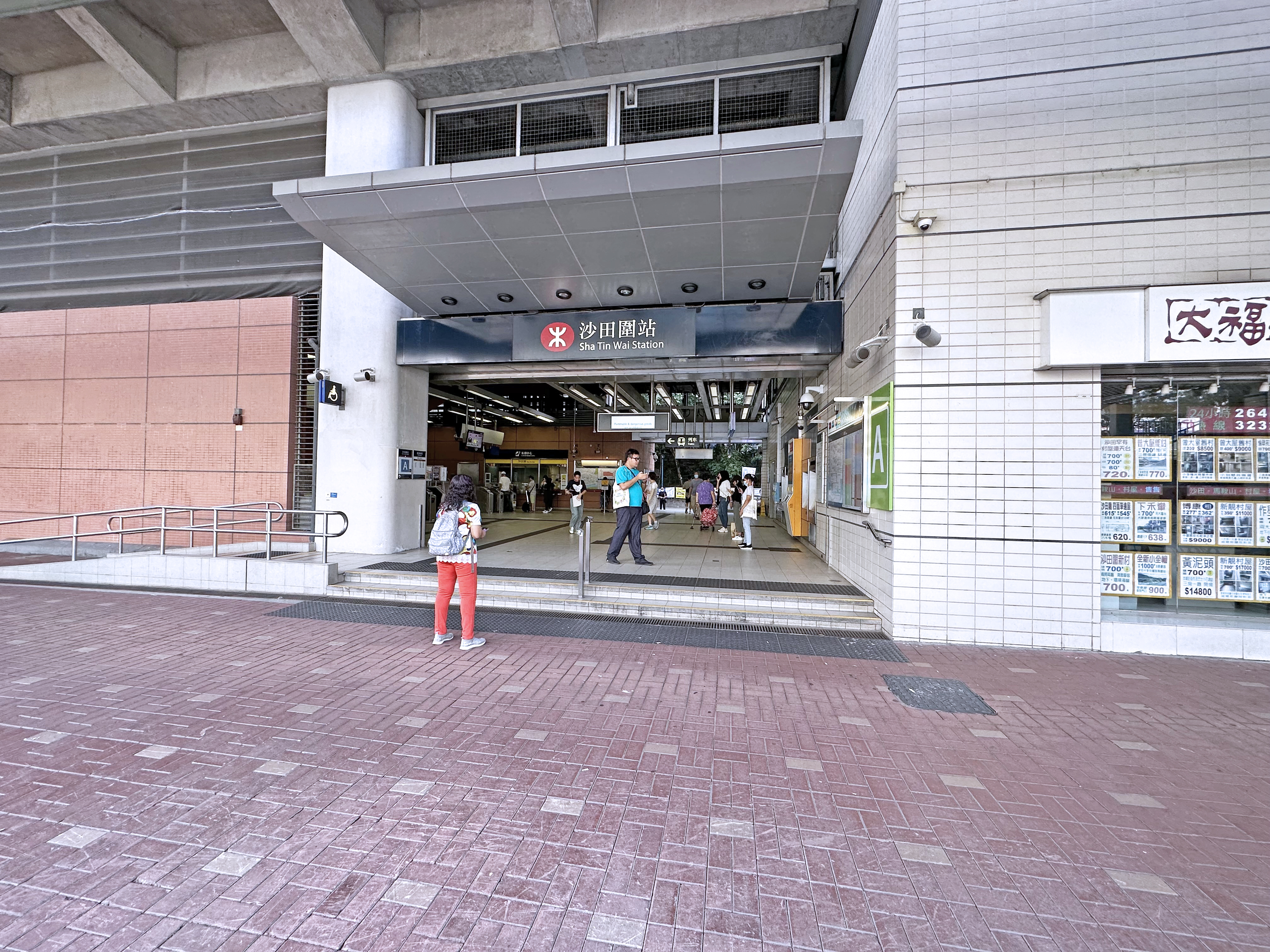
Exit A

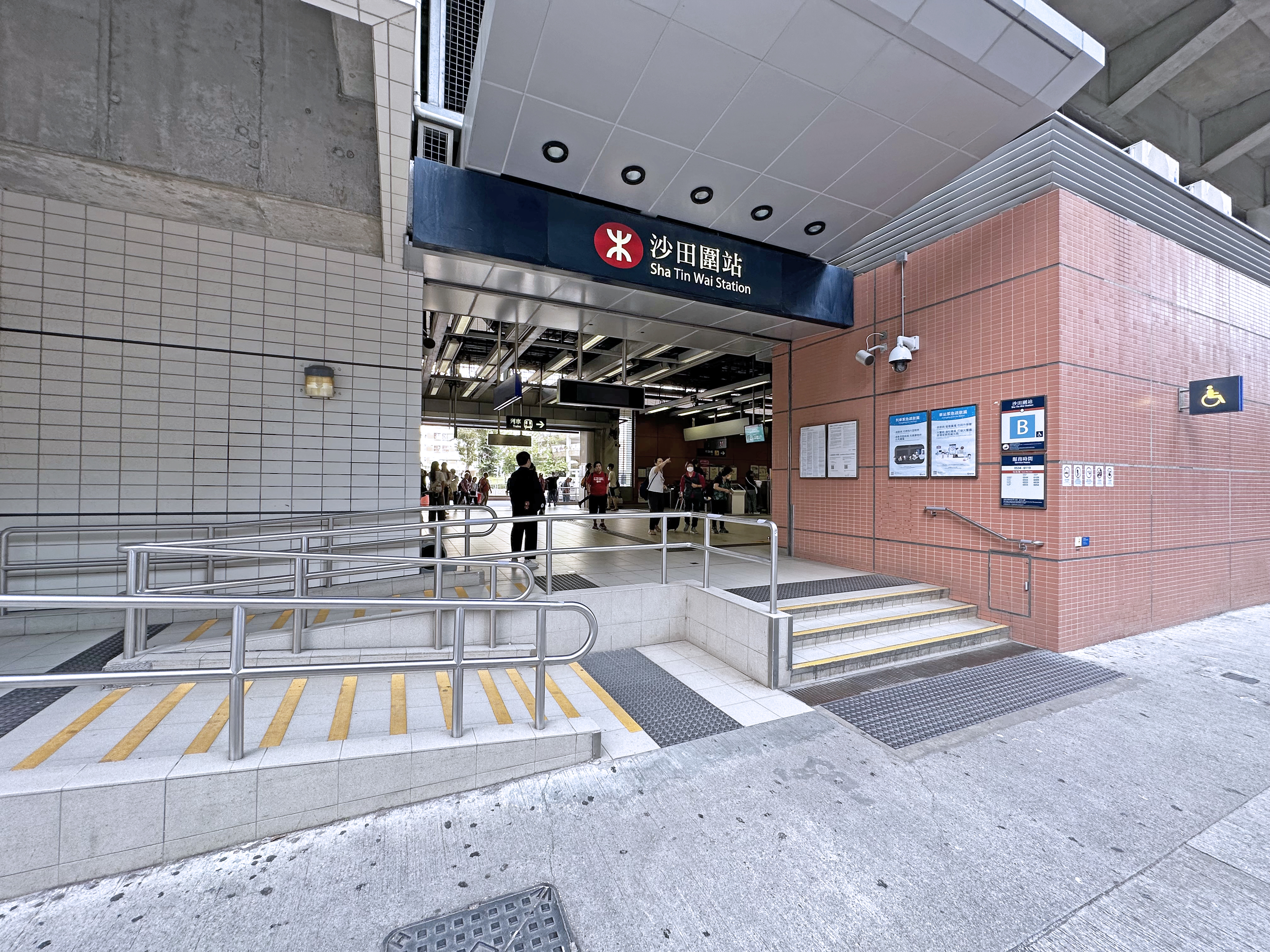
Exit B

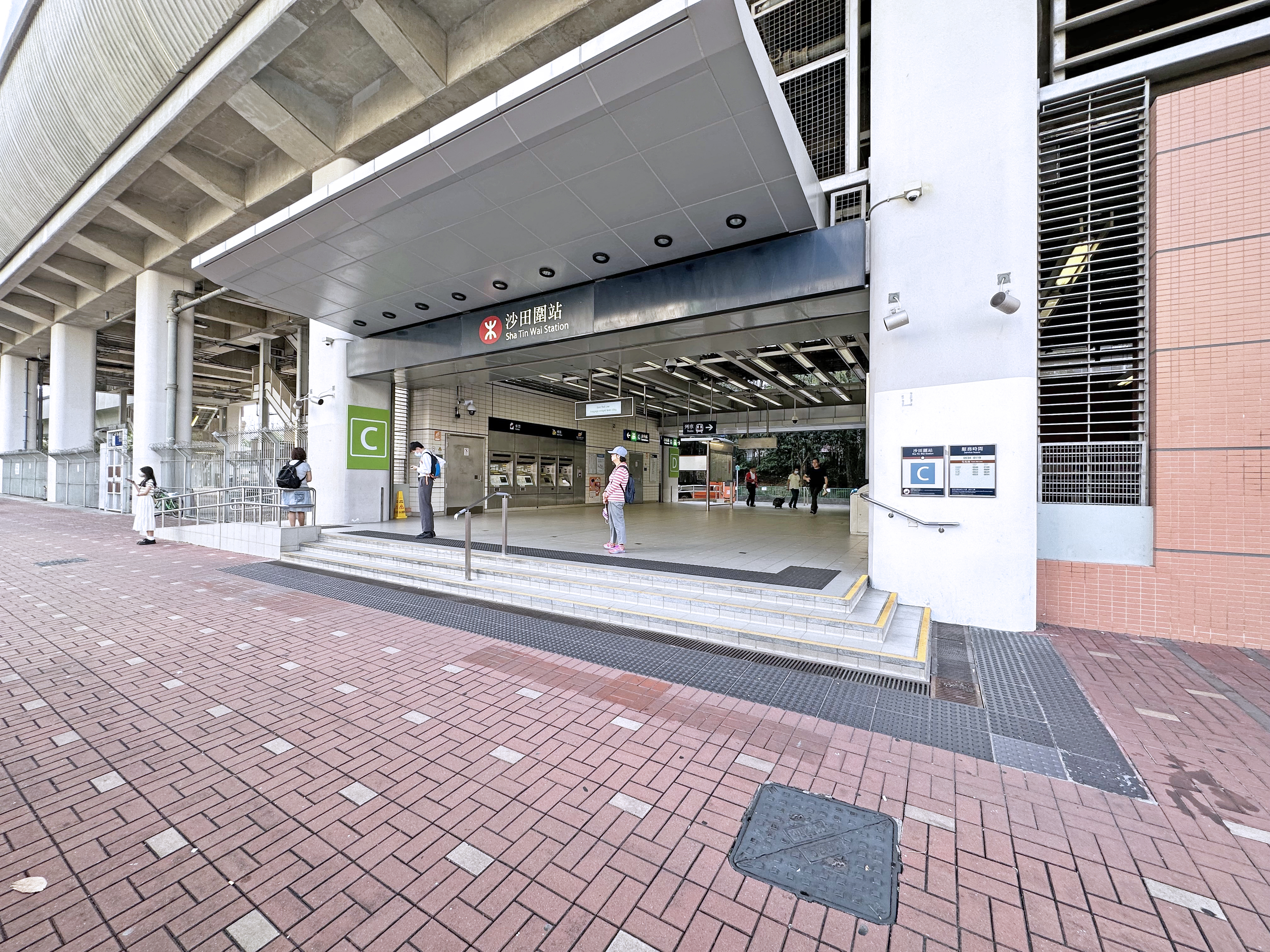
Exit C

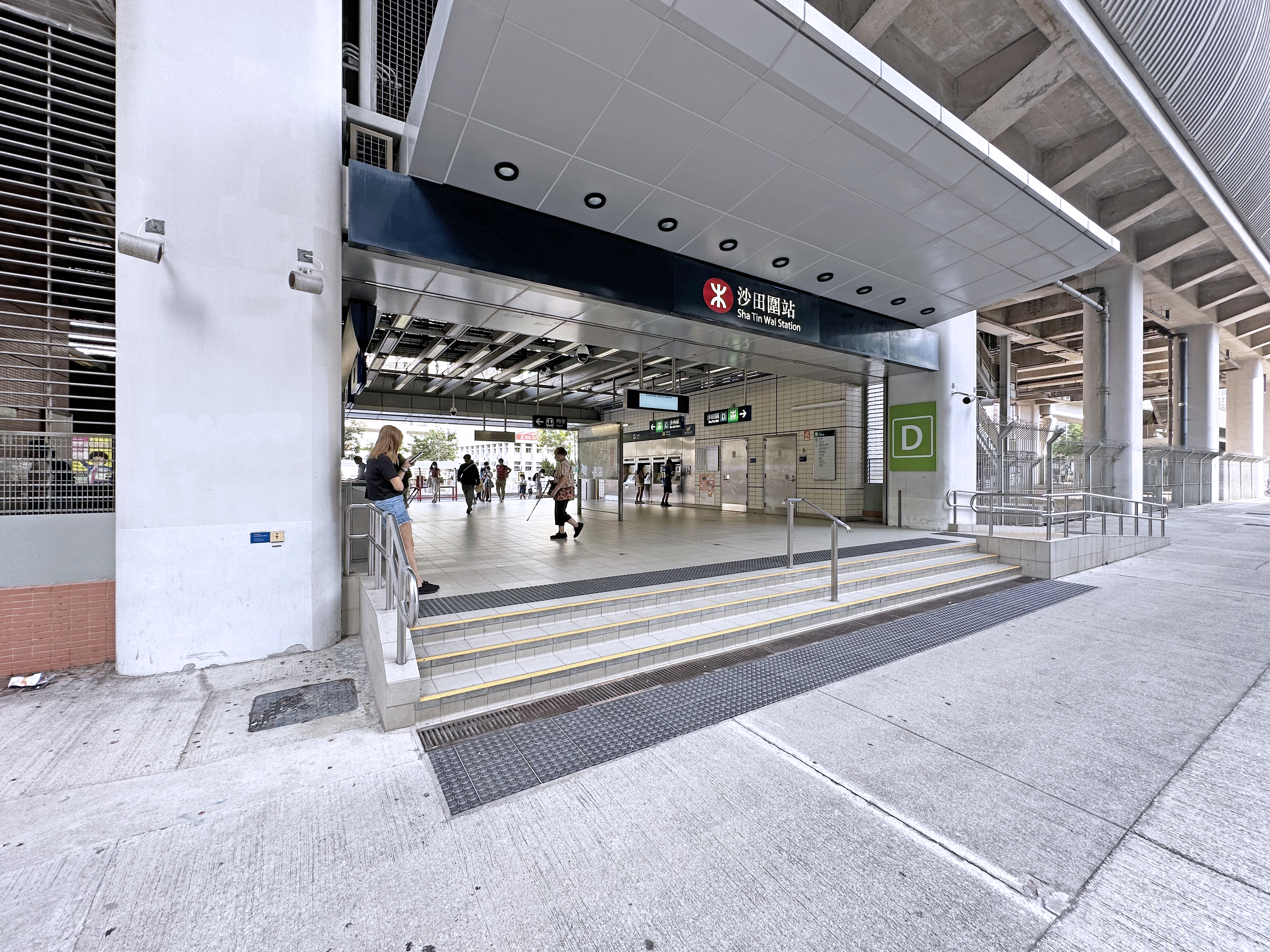
Exit D

== Gallery ==
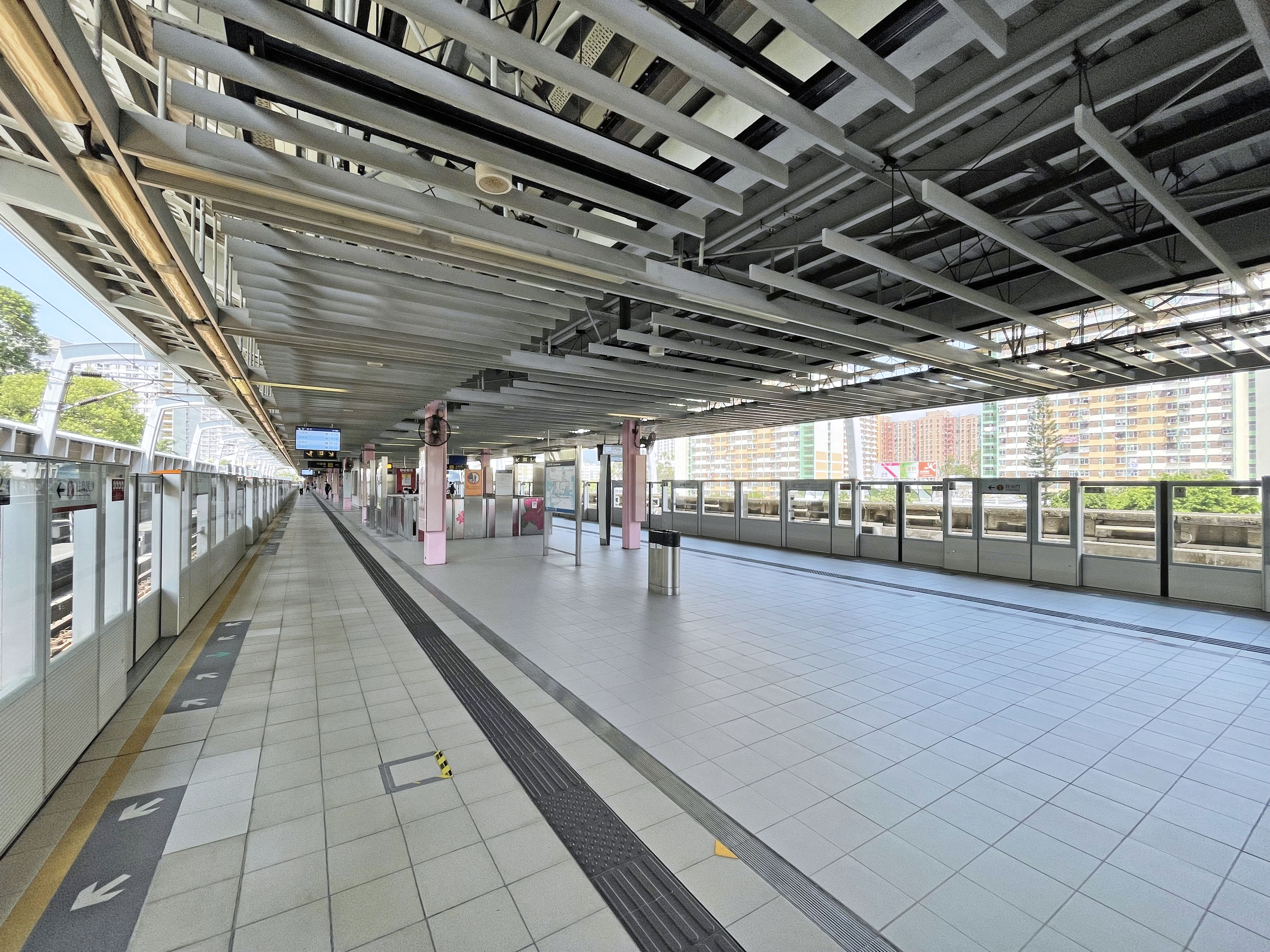
Platform (July 2021)

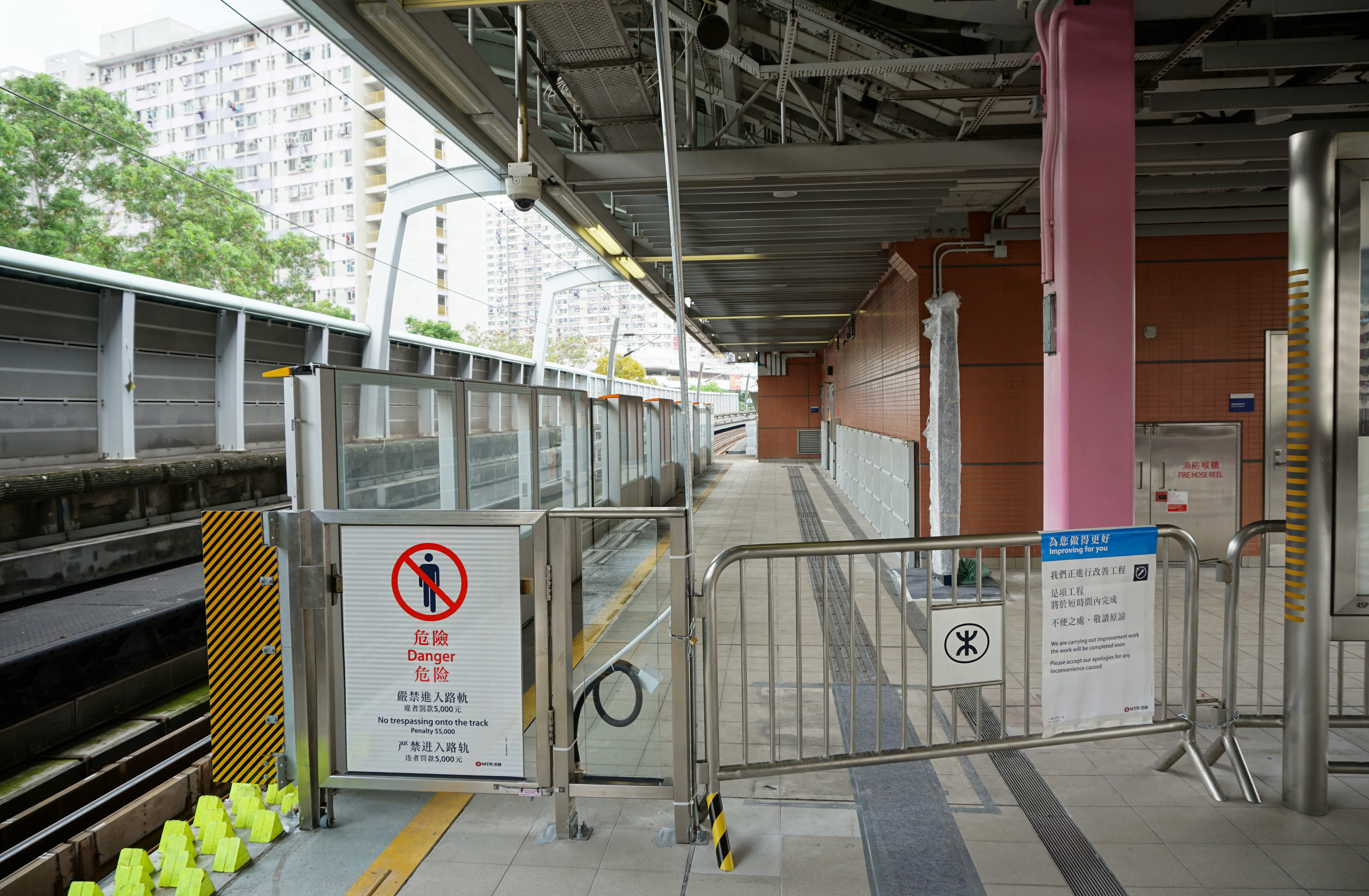
Installation of platform gates on Platform 2 (May 2016)

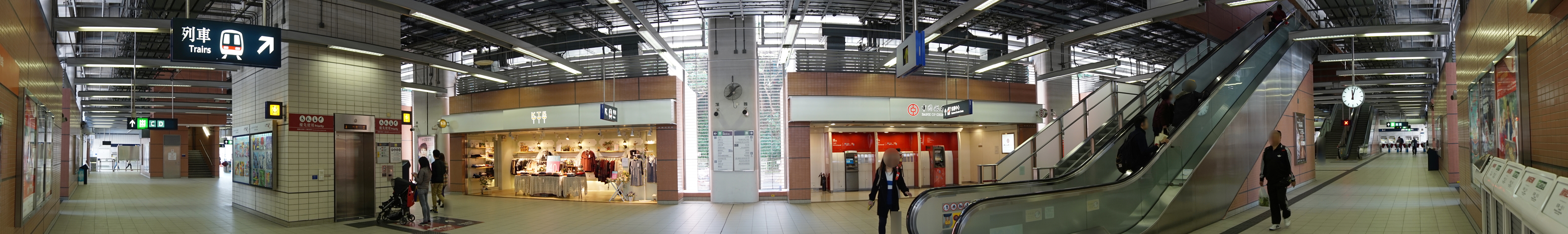
Paid area of the concourse (February 2016)

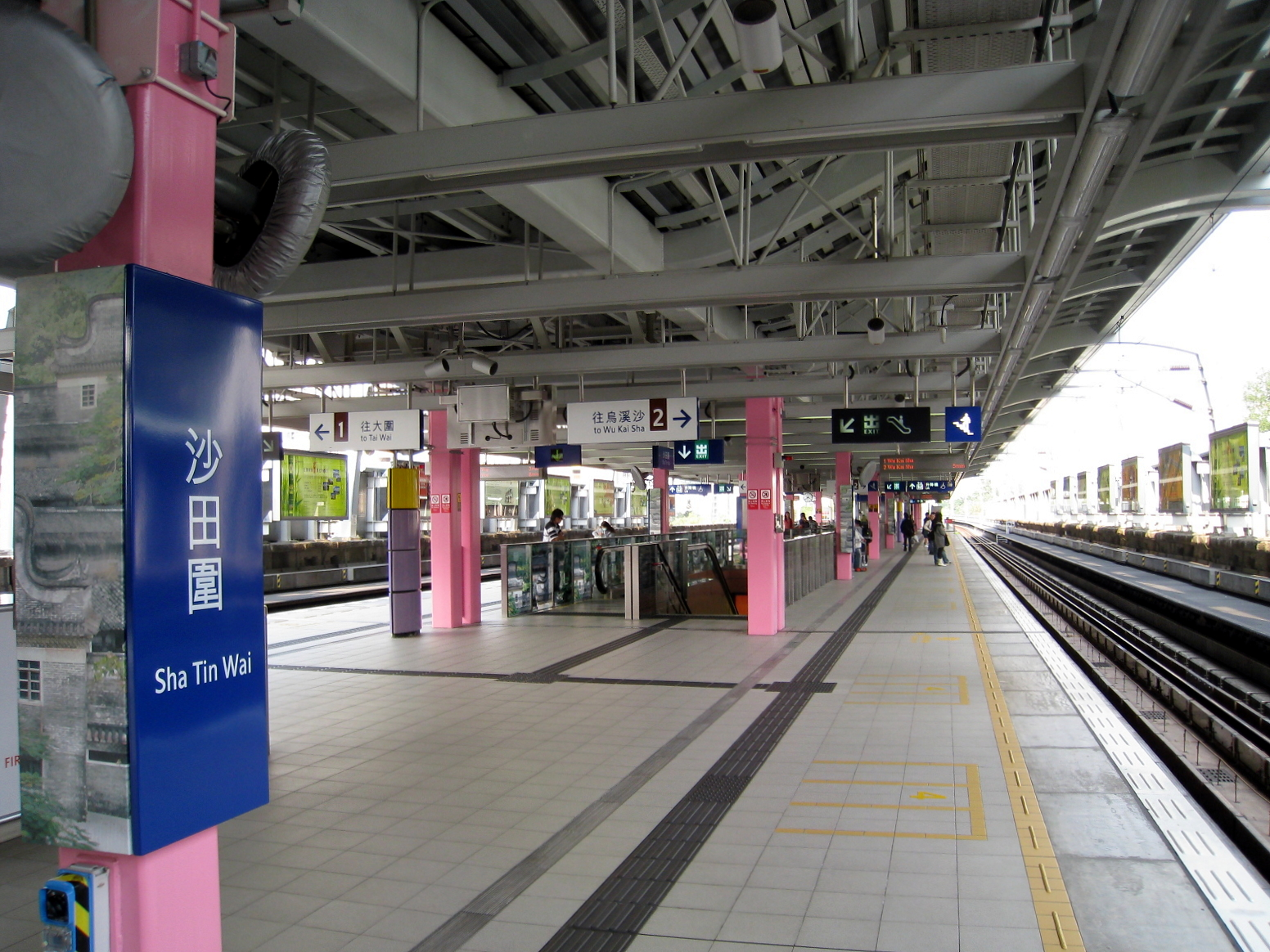
Station Platform before its renovation (March 2008)
