= Sha Kok Estate =

Public housing estate in Sha Tin, Hong Kong

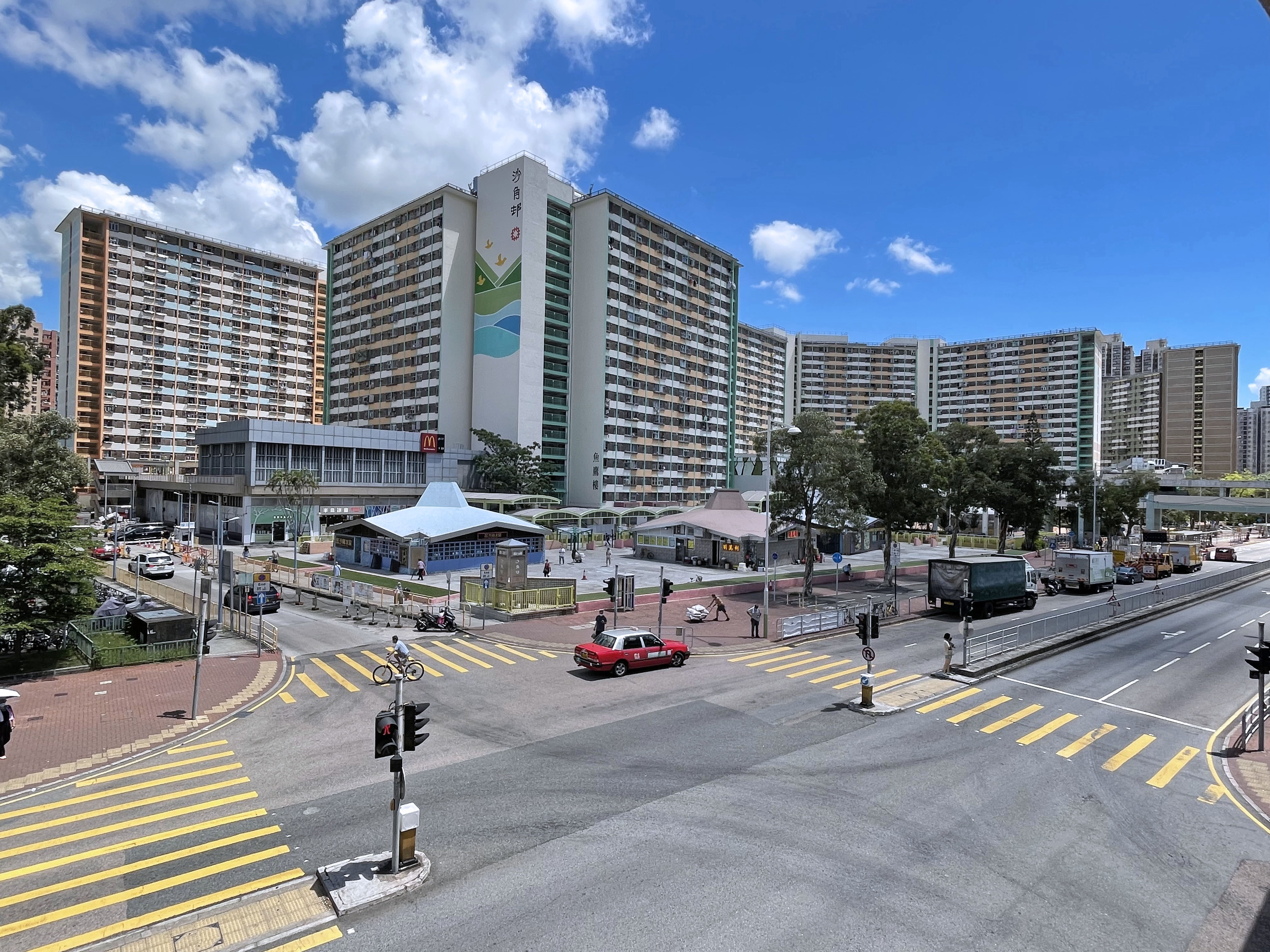
- Sha Kok Estate
- Interactive map of Sha Kok Estate

General information
- Location: 5 Sha Kok Street, Sha Tin; New Territories, Hong Kong
- Coordinates: 22.37838°N 114.19415°E
- Status: Completed
- Category: Public rental housing
- Population: 14,522 (2016)
- No. of blocks: 7
- No. of units: 6,420

Construction
- Constructed: 1980; 46 years ago
- Authority: Hong Kong Housing Authority

Sha Kok Estate (Chinese: 沙角邨) is a public housing estate in Sha Tin Wai, Sha Tin, New Territories, Hong Kong near Pok Hong Estate, Jat Min Chuen and Sha Tin Wai station. The estate consists of seven residential blocks completed between 1980 and 1982. The blocks in the estate are named after birds.

Yue Shing Court (Chinese: 愉城苑) is a Home Ownership Scheme court in Sha Tin, near Sha Kok Estate and Jat Min Chuen. It consists of four residential blocks built in 1980.

== Houses ==
=== Sha Kok Estate ===
Name	Chinese name	Building type	Completed
Skylark House	雲雀樓	Triple H	1981
Herring Gull House	銀鷗樓	Triple H	1981
Oriole House	金鶯樓	Old Slab	1982
Bean Goose House	美雁樓	Old Slab	1982
Sand Martin House	沙燕樓	Old Slab	1980
Green Heron House	綠鷺樓	Old Slab	1980
Osprey House	魚鷹樓	Old Slab	1980

=== Yue Shing Court ===
Name	Chinese name	Building type	Completed
Shing Yan House	城欣閣	Old-Cruciform	1980
Shing Wing House	城榮閣	Old-Cruciform	1980
Shing Cheung House	城昌閣	Old-Cruciform	1980
Shing Hong House	城康閣	Old-Cruciform	1980

== Demographics ==
According to the 2016 by-census, Sha Kok Estate had a population of 14,522. The median age was 52.9 and the majority of residents (97.9 per cent) were of Chinese ethnicity. The average household size was 2.4 people. The median monthly household income of all households (i.e. including both economically active and inactive households) was HK$18,000.

== Politics ==
Sha Kok Estate and Yue Shing Court are located in Sha Kok constituency of the Sha Tin District Council. It was formerly represented by Billy Chan Shiu-yeung, who was elected in the 2019 elections until July 2021.

== See also ==
- Public housing estates in Sha Tin
