= Sha Kok (constituency) =

Hong Kong constituency

- Elected constituency for the Sha Tin District Council
- Boundary of Sha Kok in Sha Tin District
- District: Sha Tin
- Legislative Council constituency: New Territories North East
- Population: 16,061 (2019)
- Electorate: 10,420 (2019)

Current constituency
- Created: 1985
- Number of members: One
- Member: Vacant

Sha Kok is one of the 41 constituencies in the Sha Tin District in Hong Kong.

The constituency returns one district councillor to the Sha Tin District Council, with an election every four years.

The Sha Kok constituency is loosely based on Sha Kok Estate and Yue Shing Court, with an estimated population of 16,061 in 2019. The estimated populated was 16,543 in 2015.

== Councillors represented ==
=== 1985 to 1991 ===
Election	Member	Party	Member	Party
1985	Chan Hon-ying	Independent	Lau Yuk-tong	Independent
1988	Chan Hon-ying	Independent	Tam Fao-chuen	Independent

=== 1991 to present ===
Election	Member	Party
1991	Chan Hon-ying	Independent
1994	Leung Bing-wa	Democratic
199?	Leung Bing-wa	Independent
1999	Yeung Sin-hung	Civil Force
2014	Yeung Sin-hung	NPP/CF
2015	Billy Chan Shiu-yeung→Vacant	Neo Democrats
2016	Billy Chan Shiu-yeung→Vacant	Independent

== Election results ==
=== 2010s ===
Sha Tin District Council Election, 2019: Sha Kok
Party	Candidate	Votes	%	±%
Ind. democrat	Billy Chan Shiu-yeung	4,321	59.25	−7.35
Civil Force (NPP)	Ha Kim-kwan	2,930	40.18	+7.92
Ind. democrat	Cheung Yuen-ying	42	0.58	
Majority		1,391	19.07	
Turnout		7,314	70.23	
Ind. democrat hold		Swing		

Sha Tin District Council Election, 2015: Sha Kok
Party	Candidate	Votes	%	±%
Neo Democrats	Billy Chan Shiu-yeung	2,627	51.9	
NPP (Civil Force)	Yeung Sin-hung	2,437	48.1	−26.1
Majority		190	2.8	45.6
Turnout		5,064	51.0	+17.0
Neo Democrats gain from NPP		Swing		

Sha Tin District Council Election, 2011: Sha Kok
Party	Candidate	Votes	%	±%
Civil Force	Yeung Sin-hung	2,425	74.2	
Independent	Cheung Tak-wing	844	25.8	
Majority		1,581	48.4	
Turnout		3,269	34.0	
Civil Force hold		Swing		

=== 2000s ===
Sha Tin District Council Election, 2007: Sha Kok
Party	Candidate	Votes	%	±%
Civil Force	Yeung Sin-hung	uncontested		
Civil Force hold		Swing		

Sha Tin District Council Election, 2003: Sha Kok
Party	Candidate	Votes	%	±%
Civil Force	Yeung Sin-hung	uncontested		
Civil Force hold		Swing		

=== 1990s ===
Sha Tin District Council Election, 1999: Sha Kok
Party	Candidate	Votes	%	±%
Civil Force	Yeung Sin-hung	2,016	58.8	+13.5
Independent	Tai Kwok-kwan	1,083	31.6	
Independent	Leung Bing-wa	332	9.7	−36.4
Civil Force gain from Independent		Swing		

Sha Tin District Board Election, 1994: Sha Kok
Party	Candidate	Votes	%	±%
Democratic	Leung Bing-wa	1,356	46.1	
Independent	Yeung Sin-hung	1,332	45.3	
123DA	Fung Pui-lam	255	8.7	
Democratic gain from Independent		Swing		

Sha Tin District Board Election, 1991: Sha Kok
Party	Candidate	Votes	%	±%
Independent	Chan Hon-ying	uncontested		
Independent hold		Swing		

=== 1980s ===
Sha Tin District Board Election, 1988: Sha Kok
Party	Candidate	Votes	%	±%
Independent	Chan Hon-ying	2,333	38.7	+12.2
Independent	Tam Fao-chuen	1,764	29.3	
Independent	Kam Choi-tong	1,149	19.1	
Independent	Kwong Kam-wing	776	12.9	
Independent hold		Swing		
Independent gain from Independent		Swing		

Sha Tin District Board Election, 1985: Sha Kok
Party	Candidate	Votes	%	±%
Independent	Chan Hon-ying	1,509	26.5	
Independent	Lau Yuk-tong	1,466	25.8	
Independent	Chan Lo Yin-bing	1,420	25.0	
Independent	Yik Chun-kwan	1,000	17.6	
Independent	Lau Kwong-ching	153	2.7	
Independent	Yeung Ying-chun	137	2.4	
Independent hold		Swing		
Independent hold		Swing		
