= University Museum and Art Gallery =

- 香港大學美術博物館
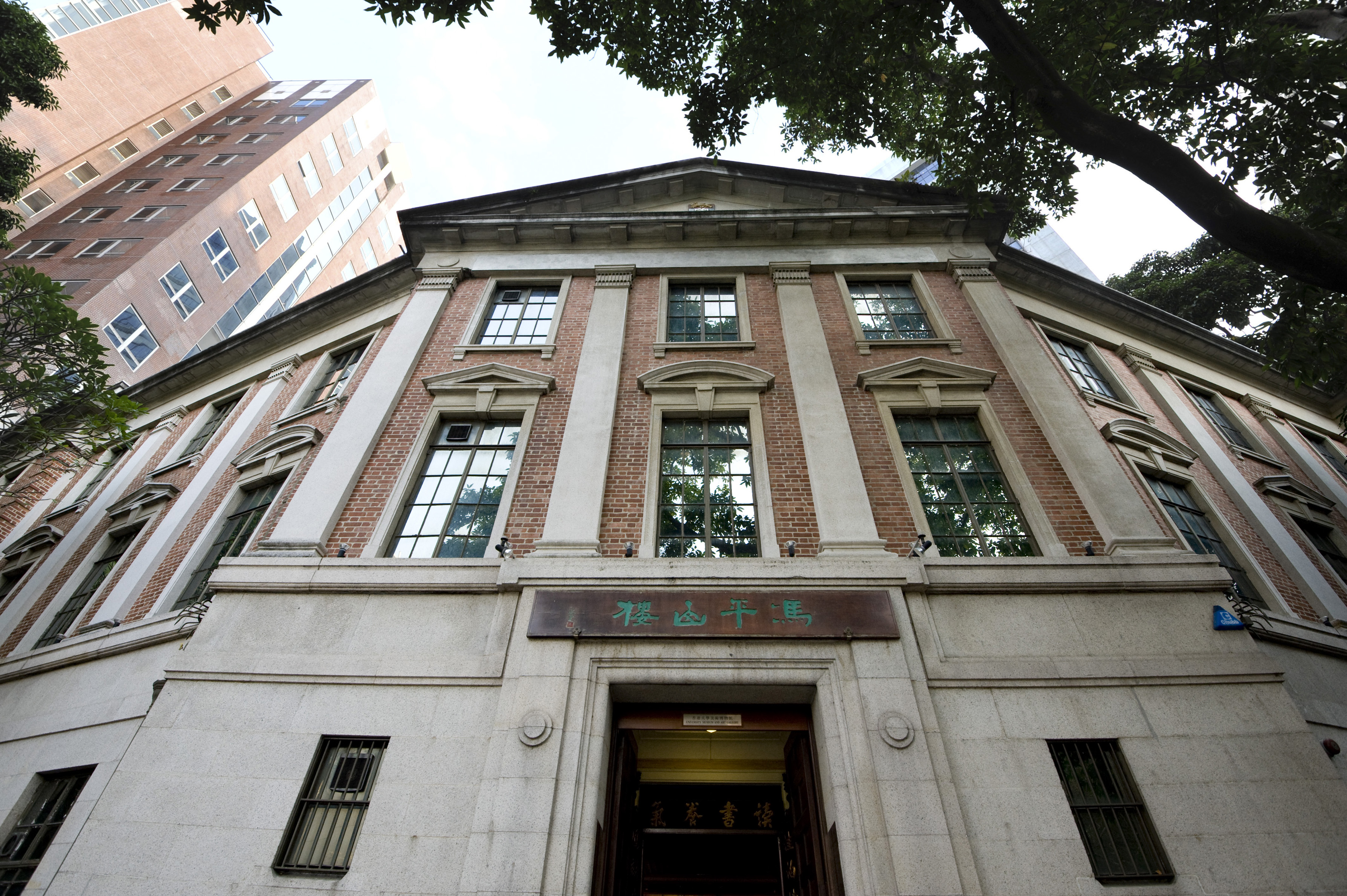
- The Fung Ping Shan building entrance
- Former name: Fung Ping Shan Museum
- Established: 1953
- Location: 90 Bonham Road, Pokfulam, Hong Kong
- Coordinates: 22°17′01.6″N 114°08′20.8″E
- Type: Art museum
- Public transit access: MTR: HKU Station (Exit A1), Sai Ying Pun Station (Exit C). Bus: 40, 40M, 23, 103. Minibus: 8, 22, 22s, 10, 31, 28.
- Website: umag.hku.hk

University Museum and Art Gallery
- Traditional Chinese: 香港大學美術博物館
Transcriptions
Yue: Cantonese
- Yale Romanization: Hēung góng daaih hohk méih seuht bok maht gún
- Jyutping: Hoeng1 gong2 daai6 hok6 mei4 soet6 bok3 mat6 gun2

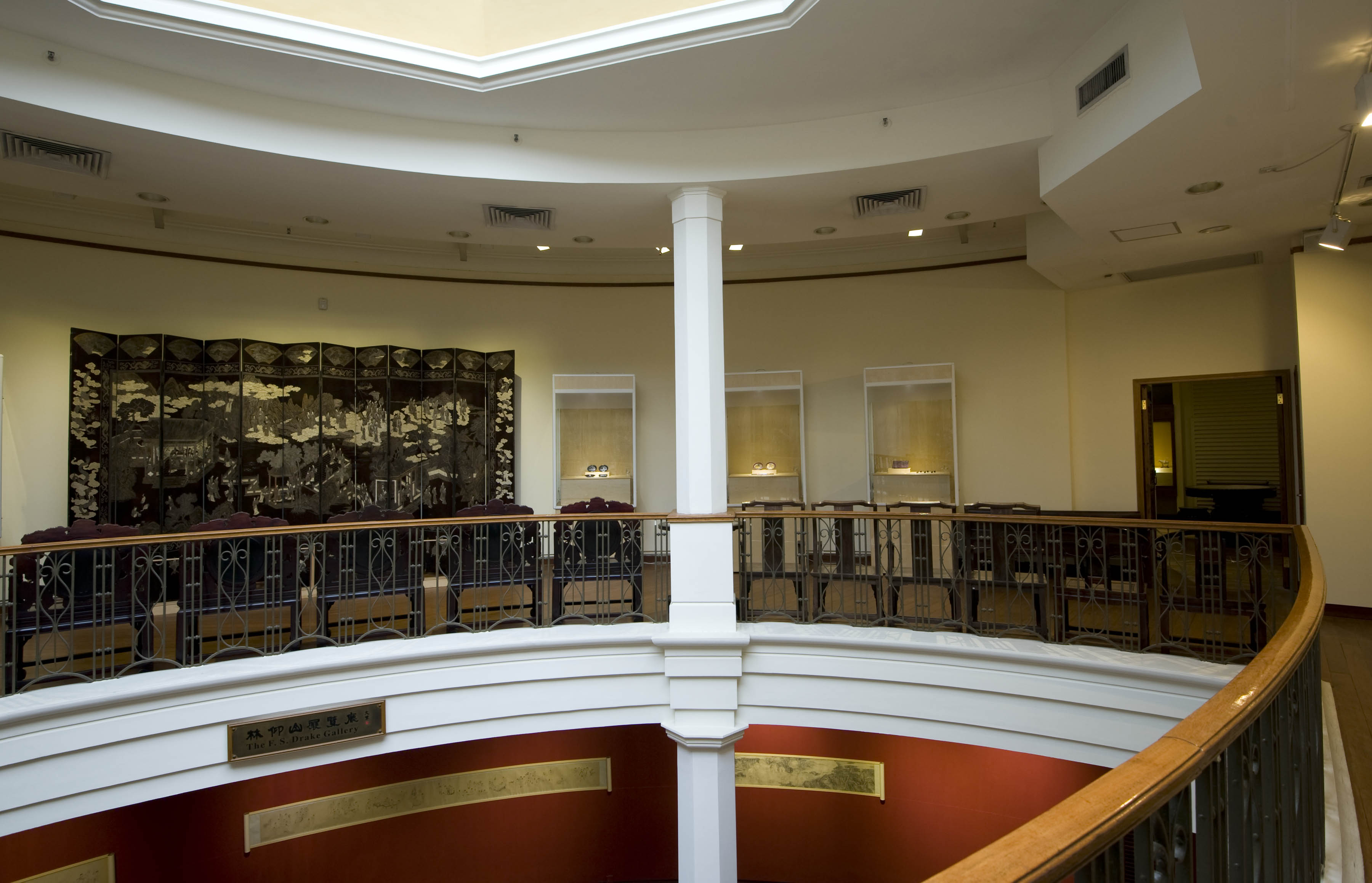
Inside the Fung Ping Shan Building - The Balcony

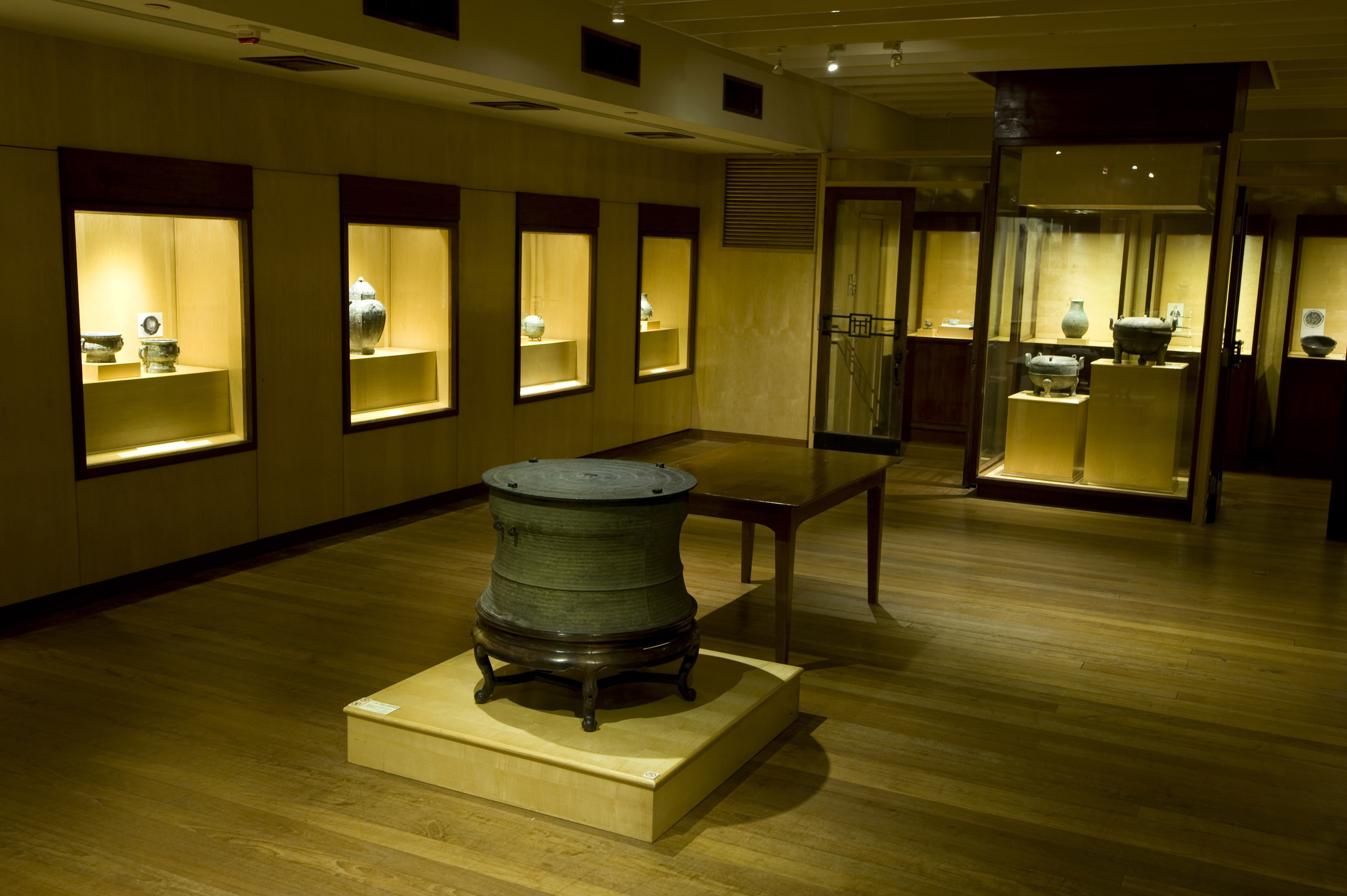
Annie Wong Gallery in the Fung Ping Shan Building (Bronx Room)

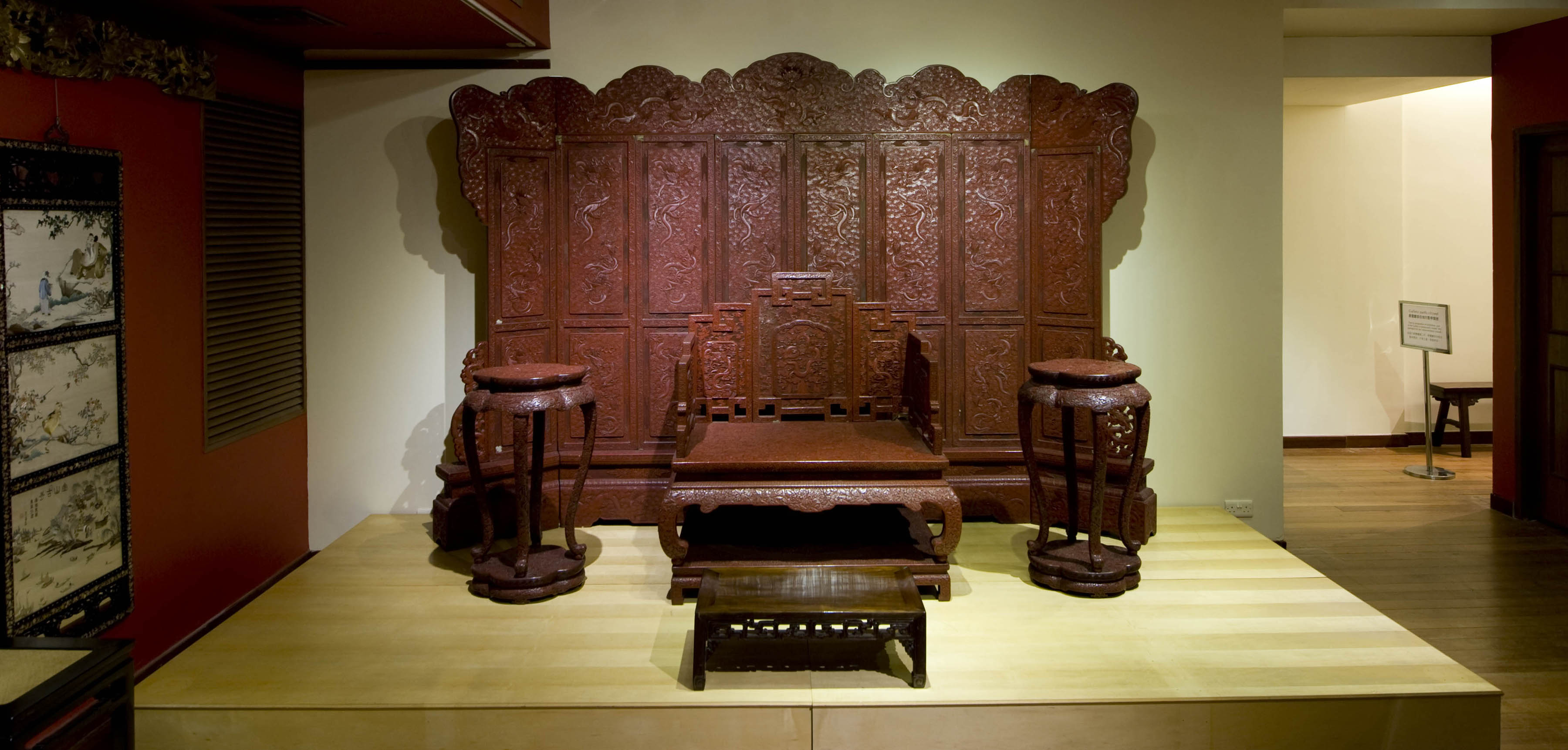
Freta Yee-Man Ho Gallery in Fung Ping Shan Building (Chinese Furniture)

The University Museum and Art Gallery (UMAG) is located at 90 Bonham Road, next to the University of Hong Kong's East Gate entrance. Its exhibition galleries occupy the Fung Ping Shan Building as well as the first floor of the TT Tsui Building, where also the Museum Store is housed on the ground floor. The two buildings are joined by a bridge.

The Fung Ping Shan Building was graded as a Grade II Historic Building in 1981 and the exterior of Fung Ping Shan Building is now a declared monument under the Antiquities and Monuments Ordinance.

== Collections and temporary exhibitions ==
UMAG houses a collection of Chinese antiquities, notably bronzes, ceramics, paintings and furniture and lacquer that has been built over the past sixty years through acquisition and donation. Artworks date from the Neolithic period to our contemporary era. Highlights in the bronze collection include works from the Shang to the Tang dynasty and the world’s largest collection of Yuan dynasty Nestorian crosses. The Museum also has a comprehensive collection of Chinese ceramics, as well as carvings in jade, wood and stone, and a representative group of Chinese oil paintings. In recent years, the Museum has also been collecting historical photographs of Hong Kong and items of popular culture. In 2020, the Museum launched a new initiative called UMAG_STArts that explores the symbiotic relationship between science, technology, and the arts through the interdisciplinary studies of art history, conservation, and novel forms of technology.

List of special exhibitions held at UMAG
	Exhibition title
10 June 2022- 9 Oct 2022	Noda Tetsuya’s Diary of Contemporary Japanese Prints
15 Nov 2019- 12 Jan 2020 (extended to 23 Feb 2020)	Jen Bervin: Silk Poems
8 Nov 2019-29 Dec 2019 (extended to 9 Feb 2020)	Along China's Coast: Dezső Bozóky's Travel Photography 1908-1909
7 Aug-3 Nov 2019	Living Kogei: Contemporary Japanese Craft from the Ise Collection
31 May–25 Aug 2019 (extended to 27 Oct 2019)	From Paris to Venice: A Photographic Journey by Willy Ronis
17 Apr–28 Jul 2019	Art of the Iron Brush: Bamboo Carvings from the Ming and Qing Dynasties
12 Apr–21 Jul 2019	Picturing the Bauhaus: Erich Consemüller's Photography of the World's Most Famous Design School
29 Apr–15 May 2019	Portraits of Trees of Hong Kong and Southern China
1–14 Apr 2019	Standart: The Collected Drawings of Antonio Mak Hin-yeung
8 Mar–19 May 2019	Searching through Teaching: Professor Jao Tsung-i’s 16 Years at The University of Hong Kong
8 Jan–22 Feb 2019	Digital Brush: The Photographic Process of Fu Wenjun
7 Dec 2018–24 Feb 2019	West Lake Panorama: A Millennium of Woodblock Printing
29 Sept–2 Oct 2018	At the Turn of the 20th Century: Pictures of the Past
24 Aug–25 Nov 2018	Tradition to Contemporary: Ink Painting and Artistic Development in 20th-century China
1 Jun–19 Aug 2018	Contemporary Blue-and-White: Turkish Ceramics by Mehmet Gürsoy and Nida Olçar
18 May–12 Aug 2018	Shaping the Human Body: Florentine Sculpture of the Italian Renaissance

== The University of Hong Kong Museum Society ==
The University of Hong Kong Museum Society (HKUMS) was established in 1988 by Mrs. Margaret Wang, whose husband Dr. Wang Gungwu was Vice-Chancellor of the HKU from 1986 to 1996. Since then, HKUMS, a non-profit organization whose role has been to provide support to the UMAG, has become a vital force in the promotion of art and culture in the Hong Kong community.

HKUMS is governed by an Executive Committee composed of volunteer members. The Committee organizes a variety of regular activities related to art and culture, including lectures and seminars, museum and gallery tours, visits to private collections and artists’ studios, heritage walks and overseas trips. Proceeds generated from the Society’s activities are donated to the UMAG for the acquisition of selective artworks, the sponsorship of special exhibitions and notable programs, as well as to HKU and the local community for the support of educational initiatives.

== See also ==
- The University of Hong Kong
- Tsui Museum of Art (former museum)
