= Tsui Museum of Art =

The former Tsui Museum of Art in Hong Kong housed a privately owned collection.

== History ==
Hong Kong businessman T.T. Tsui began collecting antiques in the 1970s, featuring rotating exhibits from the 3,000-piece collection. Formerly located in the old Bank of China building, the museum had moved to Henley Building, at 5 Queen's Road, Central prior to its closing in the late 1990s.

Chinese ceramics ranging from the painted pottery of the Neolithic period to the porcelain of the Qing dynasty formed the collection's cornerstone. In addition, the scope of the Tsui Museum encompassed bronzes; bamboo, wood and ivory carvings; jade, enamelled ware, glass, furniture, Han dynasty tomb statues.

Mr. Tsui has also founded the Tsui Art Foundation, and loaned a part of his collection to the University Museum and Art Gallery, Hong Kong, the Hong Kong Heritage Museum and has made donations to galleries in Australia, England and the United States.

== See also ==
- List of museums in Hong Kong
