= Pok Hong Estate =

Public housing estate in Sha Tin, Hong Kong

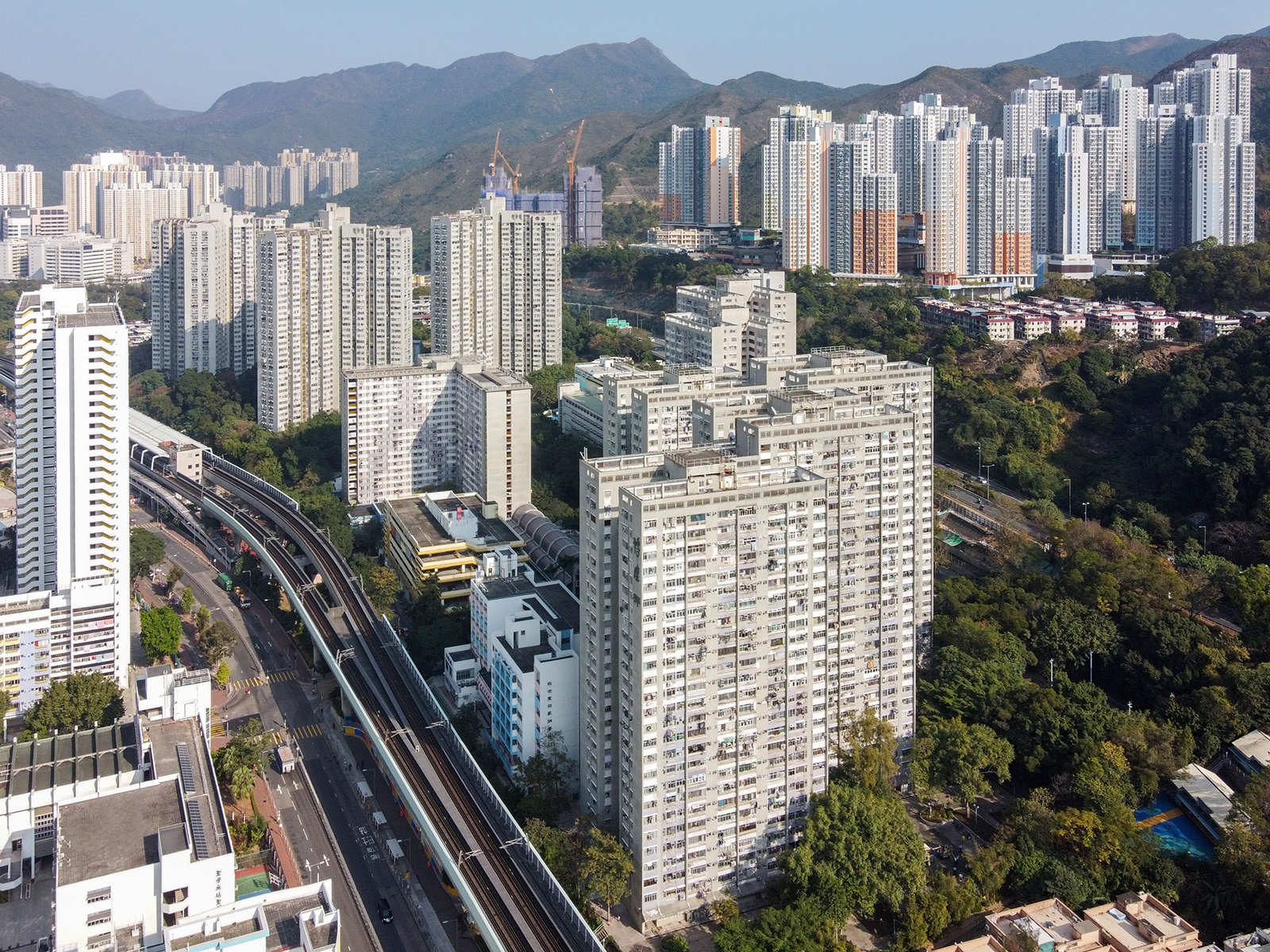
- Pok Hong Estate
- Interactive map of Pok Hong Estate

General information
- Location: 6 Sha Kok Street, Sha Tin; New Territories, Hong Kong
- Coordinates: 22.37527°N 114.19417°E
- Status: Completed
- Category: Public rental housing
- Population: 13,987 (2016)
- No. of blocks: 8
- No. of units: 5,481

Construction
- Constructed: 1982; 44 years ago
- Authority: Hong Kong Housing Authority

Pok Hong Estate (Chinese: 博康邨) is a public housing estate in Sha Tin Wai, Sha Tin, New Territories, Hong Kong near Sha Tin Wai station. It consists of eight residential blocks completed in 1982, 1983 and 1985. Its site was originally a shallow sand beach near Sha Tin Hoi. Some of the flats were sold to the tenants through Tenants Purchase Scheme Phase 5 in 2002.

== Background ==
In the 1970s, the Hong Kong Government began to develop a new town in Sha Tin. It filled the shallows and the adjacent Sha Tin Hoi to build Sha Kok Estate and Jat Min Chuen, and carried out blasting works near Pok Hong Estate. The planning area number of the estate was numbered "Sha Tin Area 5A". Later, the government decided to build public housing there. When the name of the housing estate was initially determined, it was originally named Tsok Pok Hang Estate, and later shortened to Pok Hang Estate, and was officially named Pok Hong Estate in 1981, which also means "a lot of health".

== Houses ==
Name	Chinese name	Building type	Completed
Pok Yue House	博裕樓	Old Slab	1982
Pok Wah House	博華樓	Old Slab	1982
Pok Man House	博文樓	Double H	1983
Pok On House	博安樓	Double H	1983
Pok Tat House	博達樓	Double H	1985
Pok Yat House	博逸樓	Trident 2	1985
Pok Chi House	博智樓	Trident 2	1985
Pok Tai House	博泰樓	Trident 2	1985

== Demographics ==
According to the 2016 by-census, Pok Hong Estate had a population of 13,987. The median age was 52.3 and the majority of residents (98.4 per cent) were of Chinese ethnicity. The average household size was 2.7 people. The median monthly household income of all households (i.e. including both economically active and inactive households) was HK$22,000.

== Politics ==
Pok Hong Estate is located in Pok Hong constituency of the Sha Tin District Council. It is currently represented by Chiu Chu-pong, who was elected in the 2019 elections.

== COVID-19 pandemic ==
Pok Tat House of Pok Hong Estate was put under lockdown from 19 February 2022.

== See also ==
- Public housing estates in Sha Tin
