= Hong Kong Heritage Museum =

Public museum in Sha Tin, Hong Kong

- 香港文化博物館

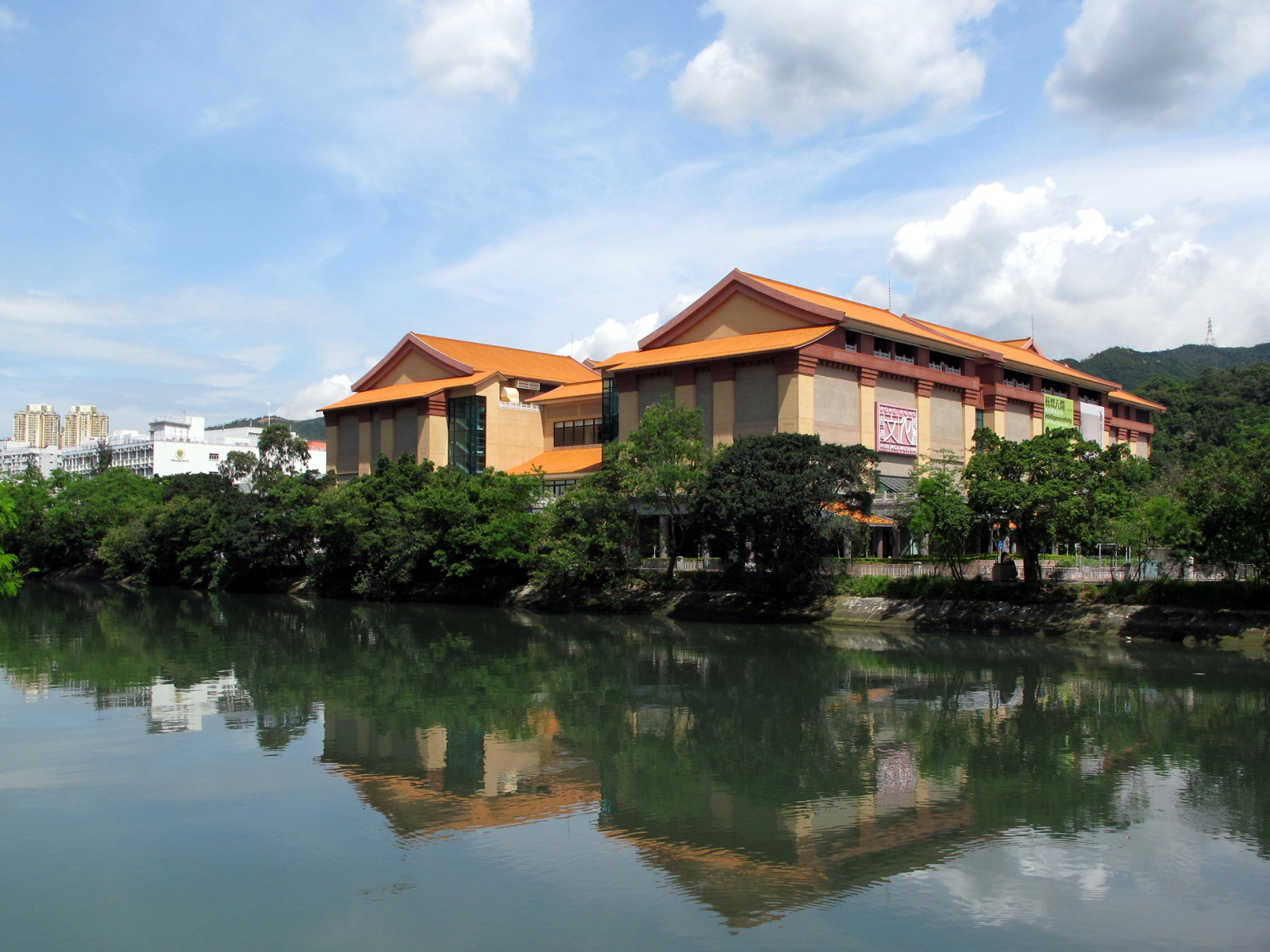
- The Hong Kong Heritage Museum in Sha Tin
- Interactive fullscreen map
- Established: 16 December 2000; 25 years ago
- Location: 1 Man Lam Road, Sha Tin
- Coordinates: 22°22′38″N 114°11′07″E
- Type: History museum
- Collections: Local history, arts, popular culture
- Collection size: 70,000
- Visitors: 688,000 (2025)
- Director: Brian Lam Kwok-fai
- Curators: Maria Lam Yuen-man, Irene Chan Yuk-lin, Ng Man-kin
- Owner: Leisure and Cultural Services Department
- Public transit access: Che Kung Temple station (Exit B); Tai Wai station (Exit A); Sha Tin station (Exit A3)
- Website: hk.heritage.museum

Hong Kong Heritage Museum
- Traditional Chinese: 香港文化博物館
Transcriptions
Yue: Cantonese
- Yale Romanization: Hēung góng màhn faa bok maht gún
- Jyutping: Hoeng1 gong2 man4 faa3 bok3 mat6 gun2

The Hong Kong Heritage Museum (HKHM) is a public museum of history, art and culture in Sha Tin, Hong Kong, located beside the Shing Mun River. The museum opened on 16 December 2000 and is managed by the Leisure and Cultural Services Department of the Hong Kong Government. The six permanent exhibitions and the original temporary exhibits were designed by design firm Reich+Petch along with Lord Cultural Resources.

The museum building is the largest in the region, and can accommodate up to 6,000 visitors.

== Features ==
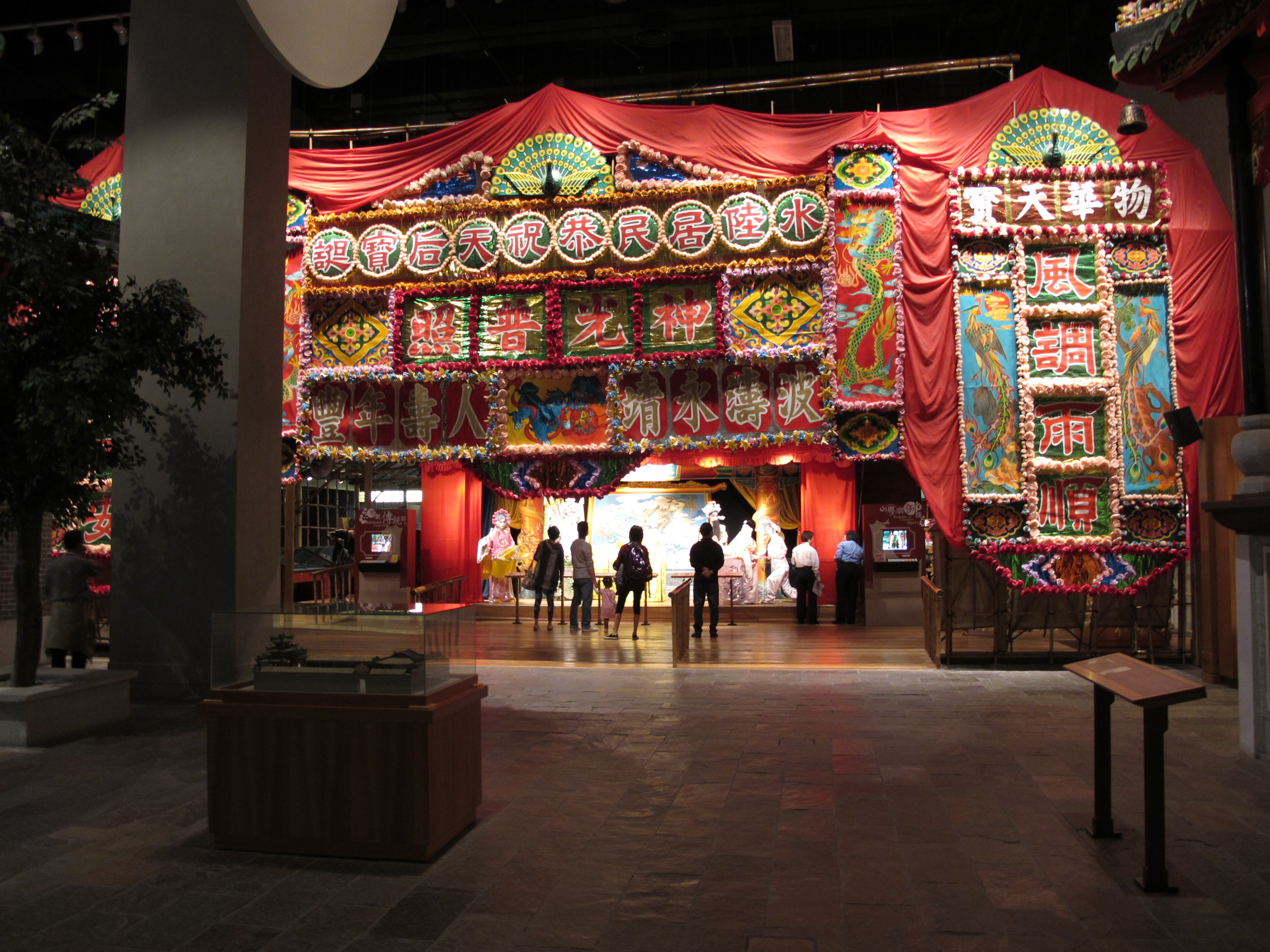
Cantonese Opera Heritage Hall

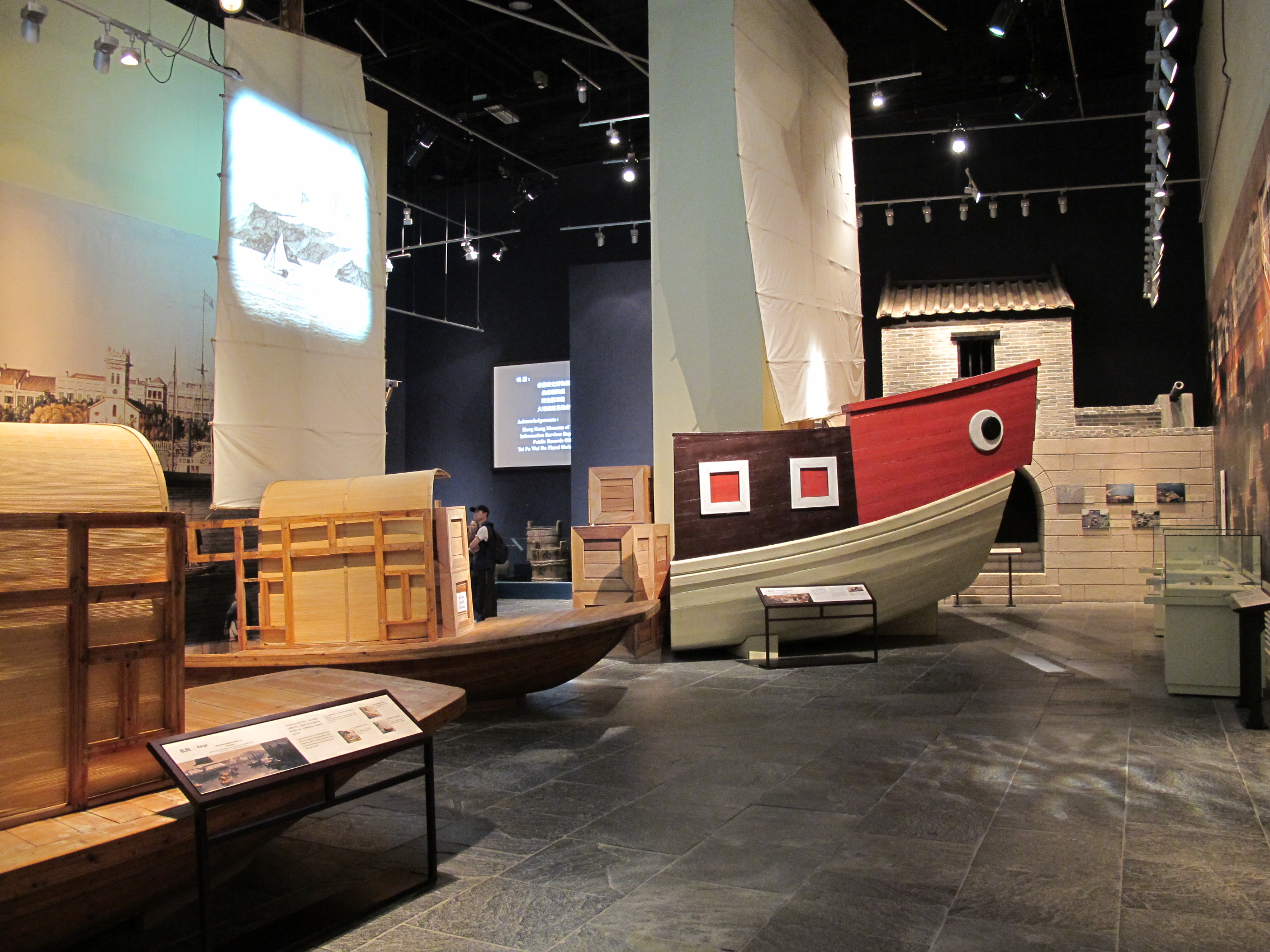
New Territories Heritage Hall

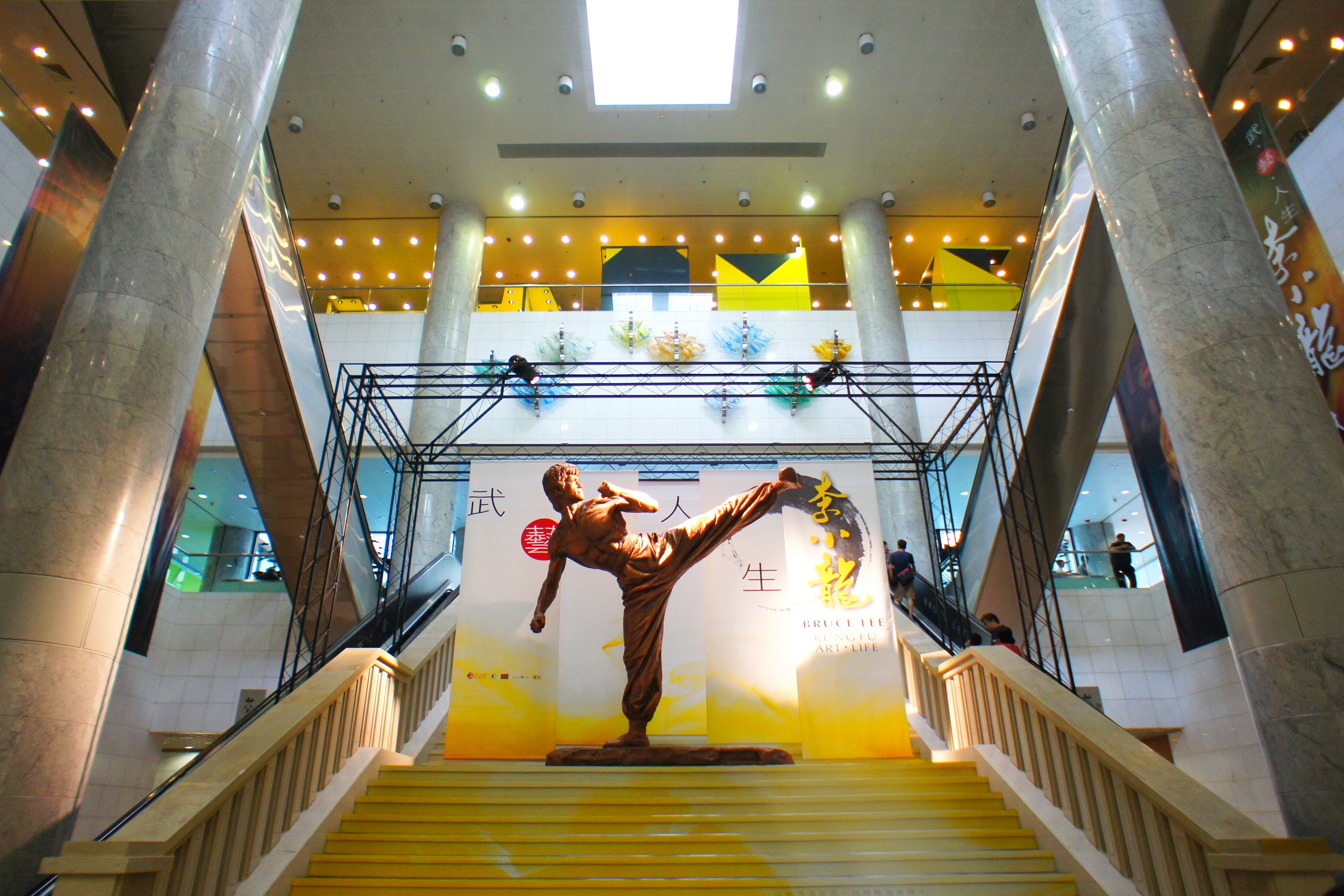
Bruce Lee - Kung Fu‧Art‧Life Exhibition

The HKHM has been designed to provide comprehensive exhibitions on history, art and culture. It has several interactive exhibitions and programmes, and also houses a café and museum shop.

The museum also has a 350-seat theatre for various performing arts and talks, including regular Cantonese opera performance. The museum possesses over 30,000 items related to Cantonese opera, which is a designated intangible cultural heritage of Hong Kong and the region.

== Exhibitions ==
=== Permanent exhibitions ===
Admission is free for all permanent exhibitions.

==== Current exhibitions ====
There are six permanent exhibition galleries for the display of the museum's collections and six thematic galleries for temporary exhibitions. Permanent galleries include:

- Cantonese Opera Heritage Hall
- Chao Shao-an Gallery
- Jin Yong Gallery - opened on 28 February 2017
- Hong Kong Pop 60+ - opened on 28 July 2021
- T. T. Tsui Gallery of Chinese Art, displaying artifacts from the former Tsui Museum of Art
- Children's Discovery Gallery

==== Former exhibitions ====
- New Territories Heritage Hall - closed in June 2016

=== Notable special exhibitions ===
==== A Man Beyond the Ordinary: Bruce Lee ====
Opened on 20 July 2013, the exhibition, then named Bruce Lee: Kung Fu • Art • Life, features over 600 precious artifacts, multimedia interactive displays, and insights into Bruce Lee's life and philosophy. It was refreshed and reopened on 28 November 2021 and renamed A Man Beyond the Ordinary: Bruce Lee. As of 10 July 2026, A Man Beyond the Ordinary: Bruce Lee has been extended to run until July 2029 due to overwhelming public popularity.

== Gallery ==
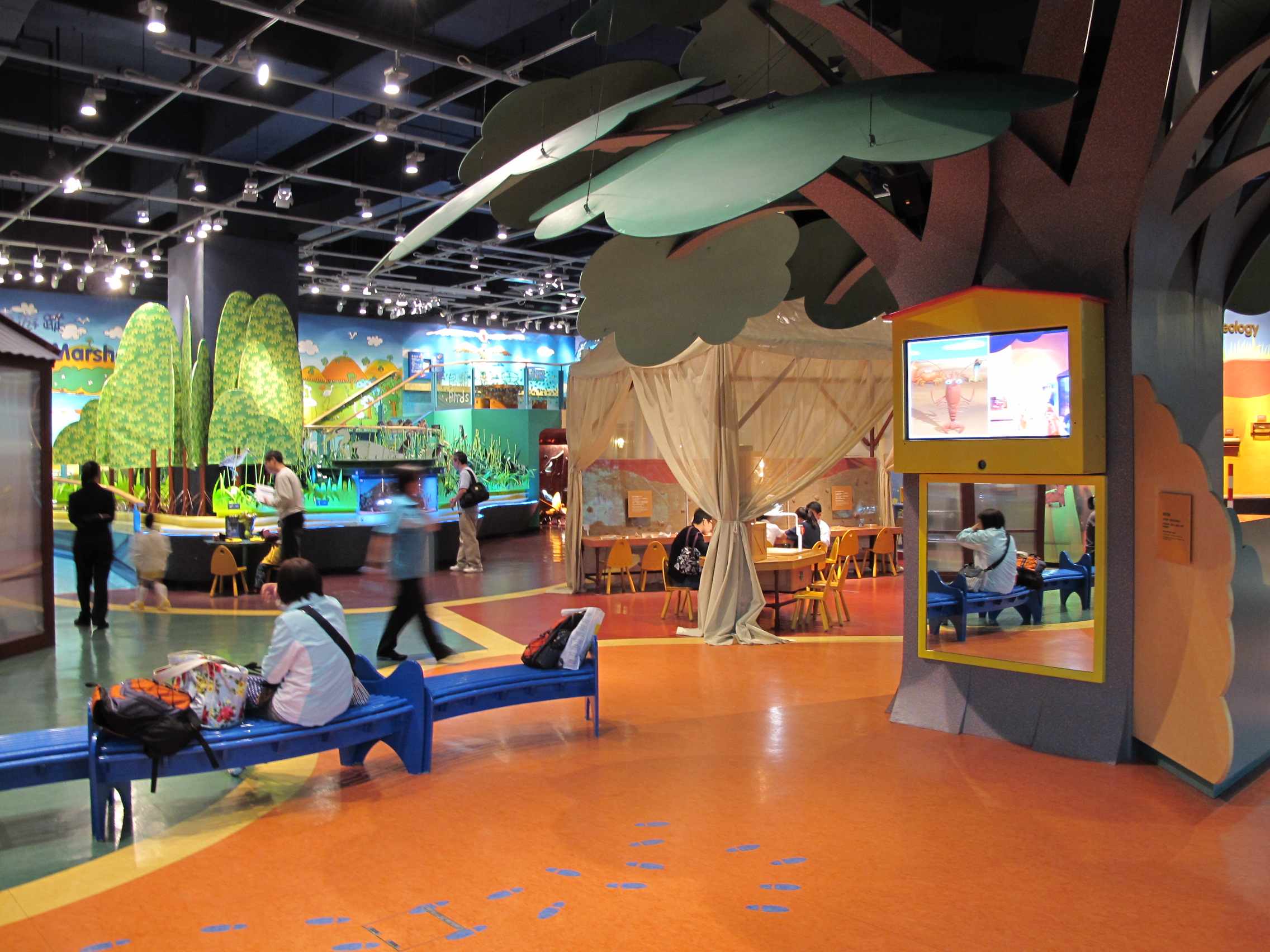
Children's Discovery Gallery

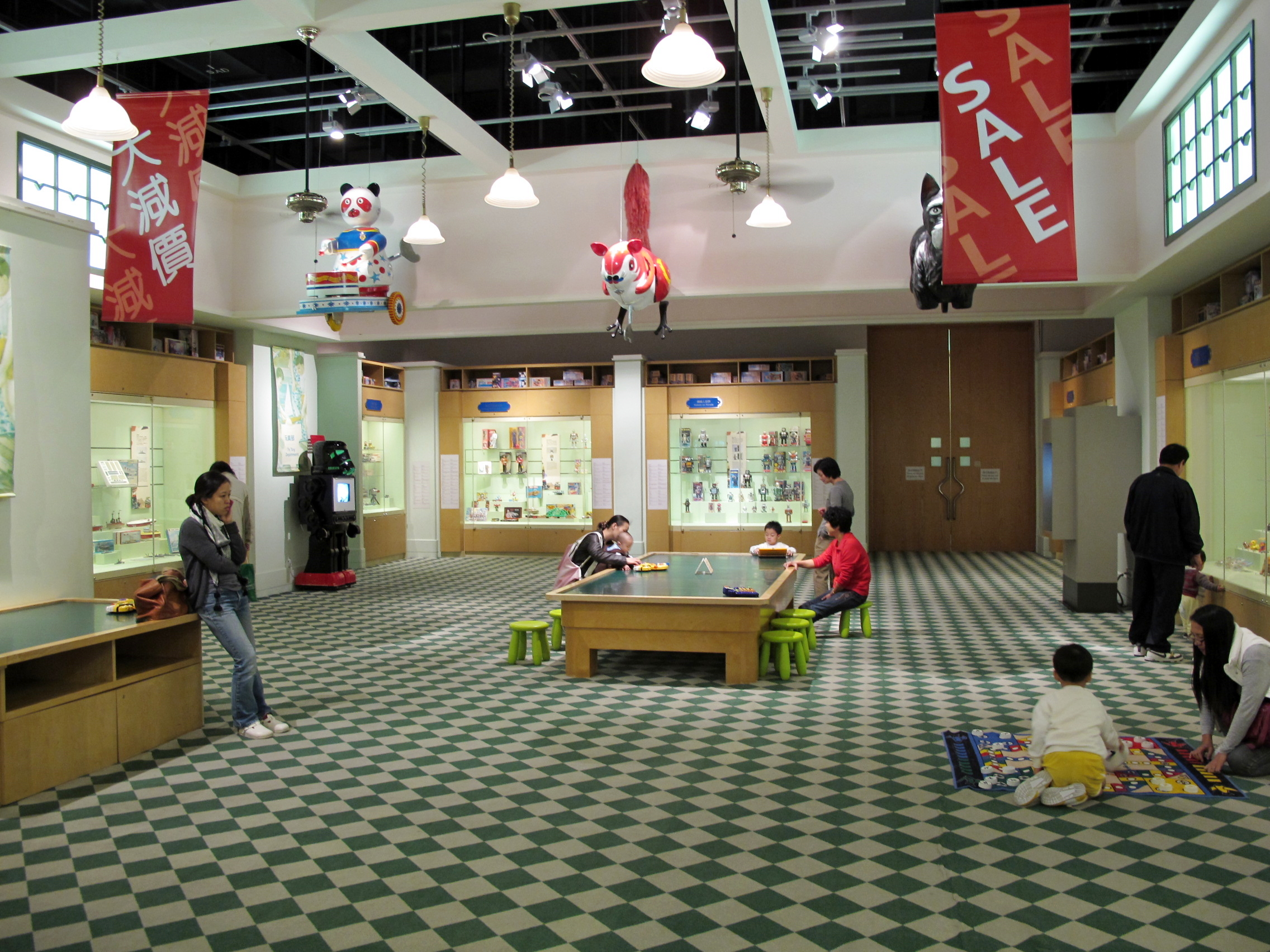
Old Toy Exhibition

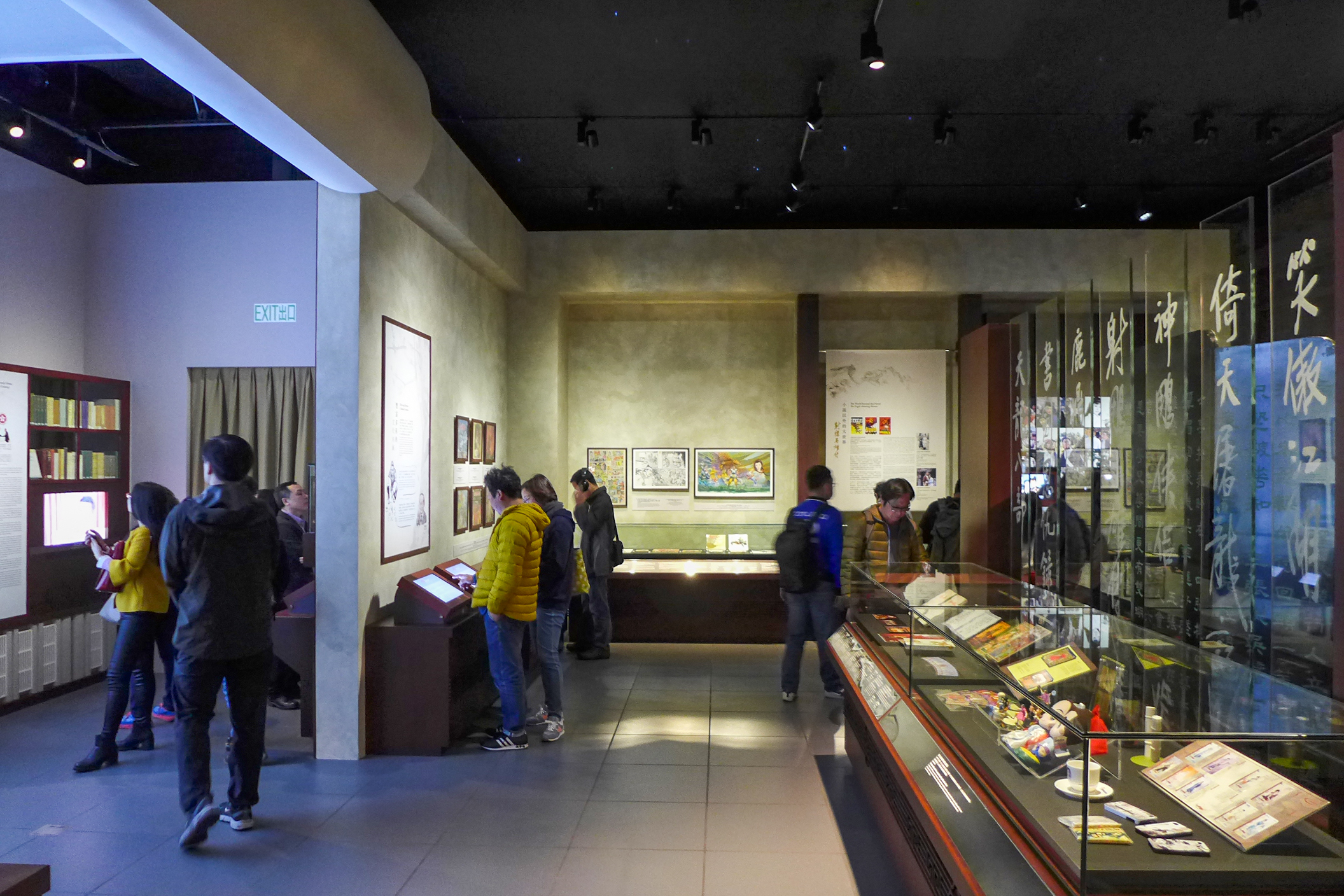
Jin Yong Gallery

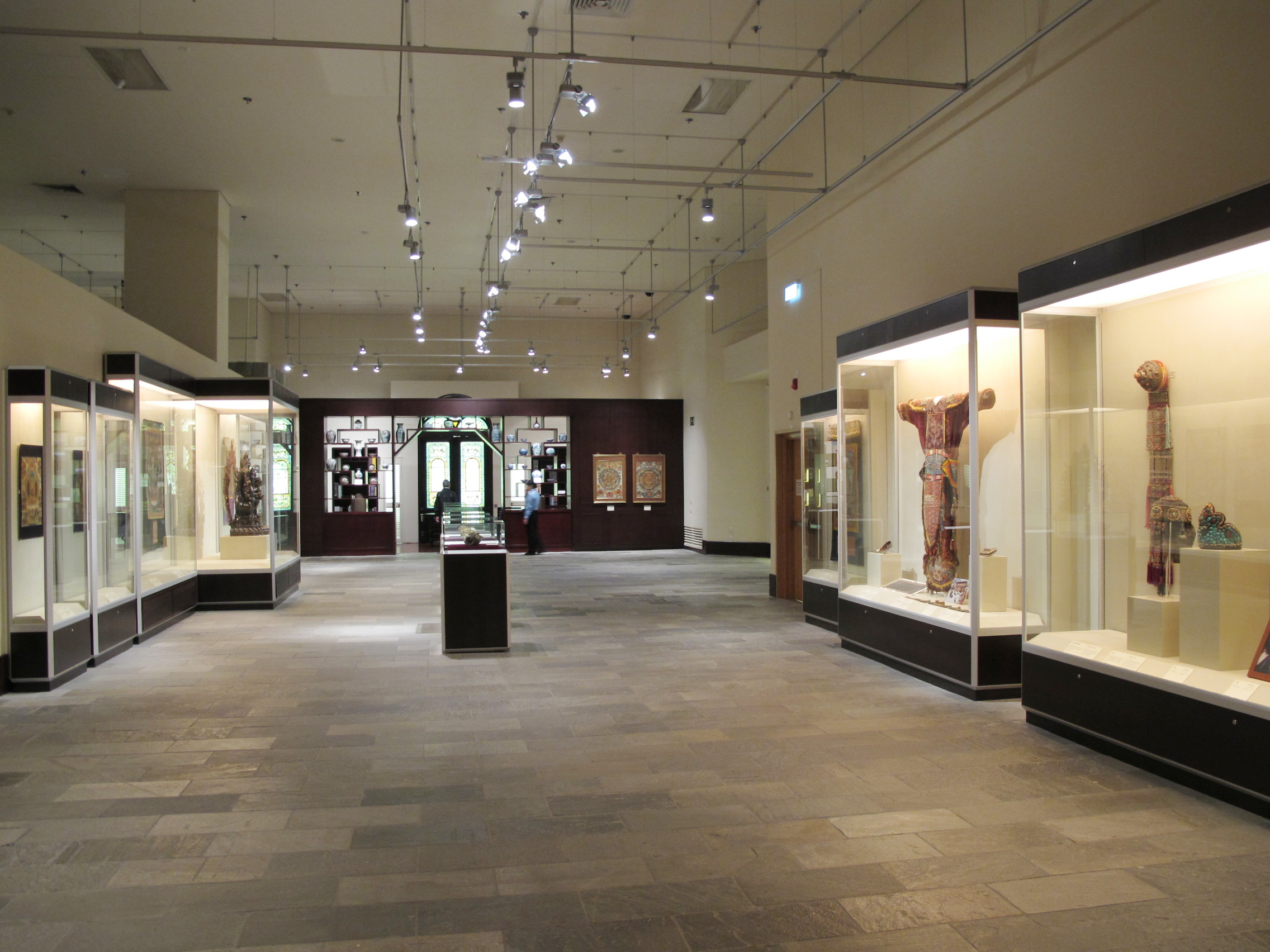
T.T.Tsui Gallery of Chinese Art

== Branch museums ==
The museum runs two branch museums:

- Hong Kong Railway Museum (on a diversion from the East Rail Line, Tai Po District)
- Sheung Yiu Folk Museum (in a former Hakka village, Sheung Yiu, Sai Kung District)

== Transport ==
The museum is served by numerous bus routes. It is also within walking distance of three stations on the MTR:

- East Rail line – Exit A3 of Sha Tin station, via New Town Plaza and then Hilton Plaza including footbridges and subways
- Tuen Ma line – 6-minute walk across the river from Exit B of Che Kung Temple station
- Tai Wai station (served by both lines above) – 15-minute walk from Exit A

== See also ==
- Museums in Hong Kong
- History of Hong Kong
- Culture of Hong Kong
- Heritage conservation in Hong Kong
- Hong Kong Heritage Discovery Centre
- Hong Kong Museum of History
