= Che Kung Temple station =

MTR station in the New Territories, Hong Kong

Che Kung Temple 車公廟
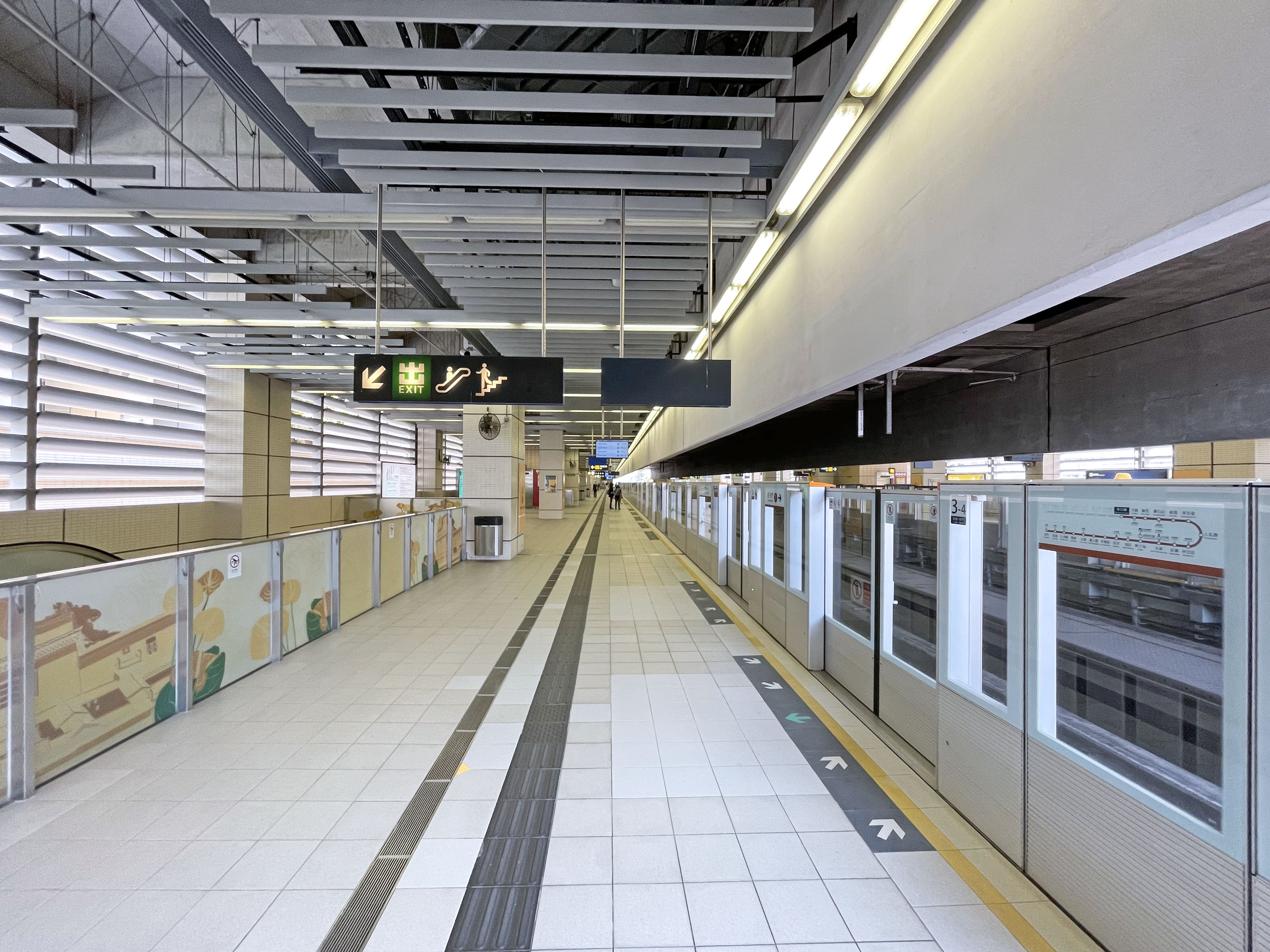
- Platform 1 of Che Kung Temple station

Chinese name
- Chinese: 車公廟
- Cantonese Yale: Chēgūngmiuh
- Literal meaning: Temple of the Car Father in Law
Transcriptions
Standard Mandarin
- Hanyu Pinyin: Chēgōngmiaò
Yue: Cantonese
- Yale Romanization: Chēgūngmiuh
- Jyutping: Che1gung1miu6

General information
- Location: Near Chun Shek Estate, Che Kung Miu Road, Tai Wai; Sha Tin District, Hong Kong
- Coordinates: 22°22′29″N 114°11′10″E
- System: MTR rapid transit station
- Owner: KCR Corporation
- Operator: MTR Corporation
- Line: Tuen Ma line
- Platforms: 2 (2 side platforms)
- Tracks: 2
- Connections: Bus, minibus

Construction
- Structure type: Elevated
- Accessible: yes

Other information
- Station code: CKT

History
- Opened: 21 December 2004; 21 years ago

Services
Preceding station	MTR	Following station
Tai Wai towards Tuen Mun	Tuen Ma line	Sha Tin Wai towards Wu Kai Sha
Track layout
Location
- Location within MTR

Che Kung Temple (Chinese: 車公廟; Cantonese Yale: Chēgūngmiuh) is a station on Hong Kong's Tuen Ma line. It is located on Che Kung Miu Road in Sha Tin in the New Territories. Its position was Sha Tin Tau Temporary Housing Area, so it was provisionally called "Sha Tin Tau" before the Ma On Shan line (the precursor to this section of the Tuen Ma line) opened.

It is located near the Che Kung Miu temple. On the third day of the first month in the Chinese calendar (also known as the third day of the Lunar New Year) many people use the station to get to the temple. The station is always crowded during those days.

Che Kung Temple station serves residential areas such as Chun Shek Estate, Fung Shing Court and Sha Tin Tau New Village. It also serves five schools, three churches and three temples. Although it is called "Che Kung Temple station", Tai Wai is nearer to Che Kung Miu (the temple) than this station.

== History ==
On 21 December 2004, Che Kung Temple station opened to the public together with other KCR Ma On Shan Rail stations.

On 14 February 2020, the Ma On Shan line was extended south to a new terminus in Kai Tak, as part of the first phase of the Shatin to Central Link Project. The Ma On Shan line was renamed Tuen Ma line Phase 1 at the time. Che Kung Temple station became an intermediate station on this temporary new line.

On 27 June 2021, the Tuen Ma line Phase 1 officially merged with the West Rail line in East Kowloon to form the new Tuen Ma line, as part of the Shatin to Central link project. Hence, Che Kung Temple was included in the project and is now an intermediate station on the Tuen Ma line, Hong Kong's longest railway line.

== Station layout ==
P/U1; Platforms		Exits E and F
P/U1; Platforms	Side platform, doors will open on the right
P/U1; Platforms	Platform 1	← Tuen Ma line towards Tuen Mun (Tai Wai)
P/U1; Platforms	Platform 2	Tuen Ma line towards Wu Kai Sha (Sha Tin Wai) →
P/U1; Platforms	Side platform, doors will open on the right
C/G	Concourse	Exits A to D, shops, washrooms
C/G	Concourse	Customer Service

Like Tai Wai and Hin Keng, Che Kung Temple is one of three Tuen Ma line stations with side platforms. Passengers must choose the right escalator to go to the corresponding platform.

=== Exits ===
- A: Hong Kong Heritage Museum
- B: Che Kung Temple
- C: Shing Mun River
- D: Sha Tin Tau
- E: The Riverpark (for residents only)
- F: The Riverpark

== Nearby attractions ==
=== Hong Kong Heritage Museum (Exit A) ===
The Hong Kong Heritage Museum can be seen on the left on a northbound Tuen Ma line train as it approaches the station. The museum itself can be reached by leaving Che Kung Temple station through Exit A and turning left and crossing the bridge over the Shing Mun River.

=== Che Kung Temple (Exit B) ===
The Che Kung Temple can be reached by exiting the station through Exit B and turning right. The temple can be seen after a short 300m walk south along Che Kung Miu Road. It should be said, though, that Che Kung Temple is actually closer to Tai Wai station than Che Kung Temple station.
