= Jat Min Chuen =

Public housing estate in Sha Tin, Hong Kong

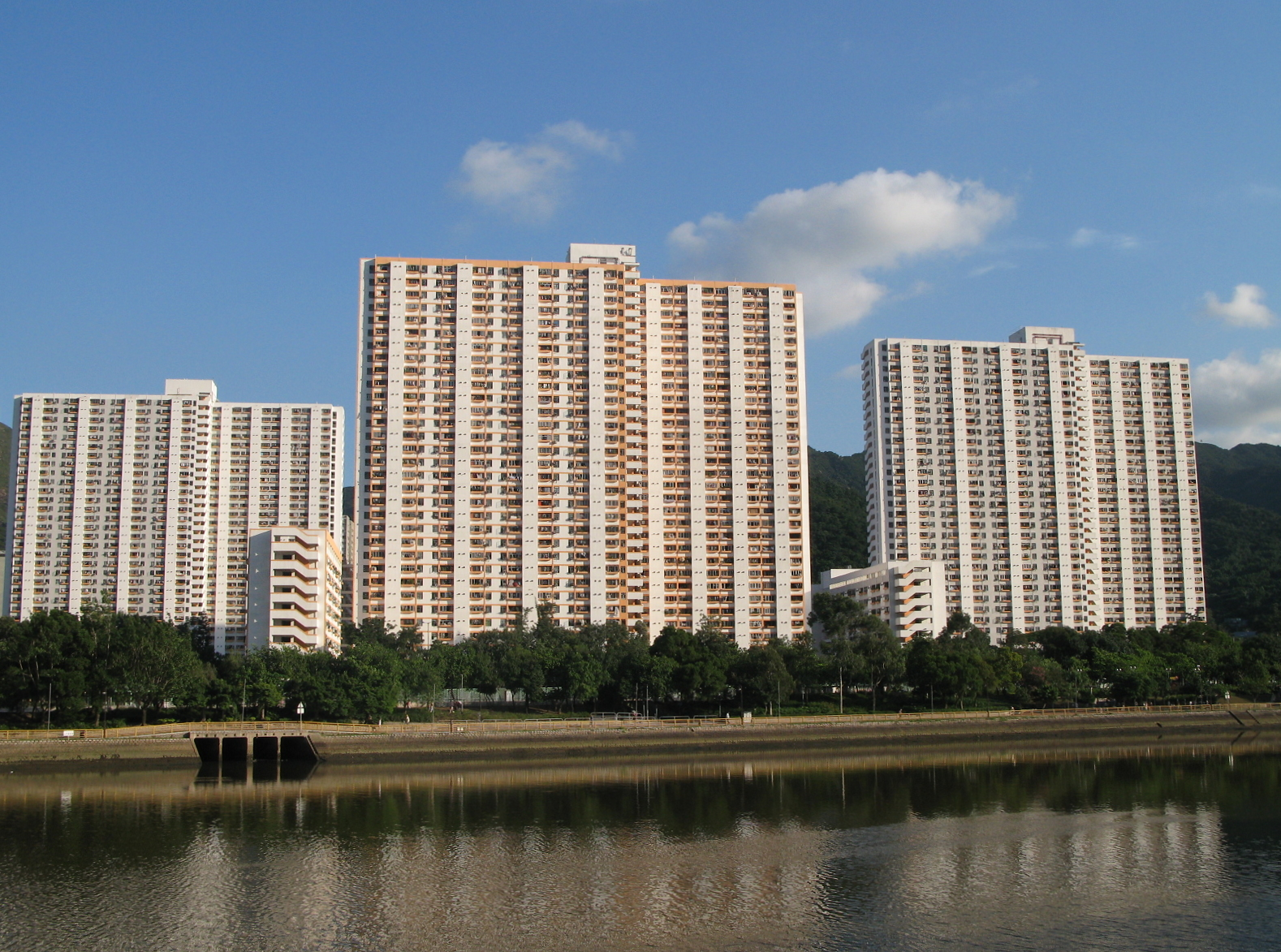
- Jat Min Chuen
- Interactive map of Jat Min Chuen

General information
- Location: 3, 11 and 17 Jat Min Chuen Street, Sha Tin; New Territories, Hong Kong
- Coordinates: 22.3764123°N 114.190647°E
- Status: Completed
- Category: Public rental housing
- Population: 9,577 (2016)
- No. of blocks: 3
- No. of units: 3,730

Construction
- Constructed: 1981; 45 years ago
- Authority: Hong Kong Housing Society

Jat Min Chuen (Chinese: 乙明邨) is a public housing estate in Sha Tin Wai, Sha Tin, New Territories, Hong Kong. It is the only estate in Sha Tin developed by the Hong Kong Housing Society. It consists of three residential buildings completed in 1981 and 1982.

== Background ==
The estate was named for Mr. Tan Jat Min (陳乙明), the former honorary treasurer of the Society and was the largest estate of the Housing Society at the time.

Unlike other estates, the Hong Kong Housing Society financed the construct of Jat Min Chuen using a bank loan at a high interest rate, rather than from the Government. Therefore, the rent in the estate was forced to be put up as the Society needed to return money to banks afterwards.

== Houses ==
Name	Chinese name	Completed
Ming Yan Lau	明恩樓	1981
Ming Shun Lau	明信樓	1981
Ming Yiu Lau	明耀樓	1982
Chung Yuet Lau	松悦樓	2024

== Demographics ==
According to the 2016 by-census, Jat Min Chuen had a population of 9,577. The median age was 51.1 and the majority of residents (98.2 per cent) were of Chinese ethnicity. The average household size was 2.6 people. The median monthly household income of all households (i.e. including both economically active and inactive households) was HK$23,000.

== Politics ==
Jat Min Chuen is located in Jat Chuen constituency of the Sha Tin District Council. It was represented by Yau Man-chun, who was elected in the 2019 elections. He had resigned on 7 July 2021, leaving the seat vacant since then.

== See also ==
- Public housing estates in Sha Tin
