= List of shopping centres in Hong Kong =

This is an alphabetical list of shopping centres or malls in Hong Kong.

Most of Hong Kong's shopping centres are in the new towns in the New Territories.

Many Hong Kong shopping centres are attached to housing estates or commercial office towers.

== List ==
- 11 SKIES, Chek Lap Kok
- Allied Plaza, Prince Edward
- Amoy Plaza, Amoy Gardens, Kowloon Bay
- apm, Millennium City 5, Kwun Tong
- Butterfly Plaza, Tuen Mun
- Causeway Bay Plaza, Causeway Bay
- Chanway Shopping Centre, Sha Tin
- Cheung Fat Plaza, Tsing Yi
- Cheung Sha Wan Plaza, Cheung Sha Wan
- China Hong Kong City, Tsim Sha Tsui
- Choi Ming Plaza, Tiu Keng Leng
- Choi Yuen Plaza, Sheung Shui
- Chuk Yuen Plaza, Wong Tai Sin
- Chung Fu Plaza, Tin Shui Wai
- Chung On Shopping Centre, Ma On Shan
- Citygate, Tung Chung
- Citylink, Sha Tin New Town
- Cityplaza, Taikoo Shing
- Citywalk, Tsuen Wan
- Concord Square, Tsuen Wan
- Discovery Park, Tsuen Wan (D-PARK)
- Domain, Yau Tong
- Dragon Centre, Sham Shui Po
- E Plaza, Kwun Tong
- East Point Centre, Causeway Bay
- East Point City, Hang Hau
- The Elegance at Sheraton, Tsim Sha Tsui
- Elements, Jordan
- Fashion Walk, Causeway Bay
- Festival Walk, Kowloon Tong
- Fortune City One, City One, Sha Tin
- Fu Tung Plaza, Tung Chung
- Golden Computer Centre and Golden Computer Arcade, Sham Shui Po
- Harbour City, Tsim Sha Tsui
- Hing Wah Plaza, Chai Wan
- HomeSquare, Shatin
- Hysan Place, Causeway Bay
- Infinitus Plaza, Sheung Wan
- ifc mall, Central
- Island Beverley, Causeway Bay
- iSQUARE, Tsim Sha Tsui
- K11, Tsim Sha Tsui
- K11 Musea, Tsim Sha Tsui
- KOLOUR Tsuen Wan, Tsuen Wan
- KOLOUR Yuen Long, Yuen Long
- Kornhill Plaza, Tai Koo
- Kowloon City Plaza, Kowloon City
- Kwai Chung Plaza, Kwai Chung
- Kwai Fong Plaza, Kwai Chung
- The Landmark, Central
- Landmark North, Sheung Shui
- La Cite Noble, Hang Hau
- Langham Place, Mong Kok
- Lek Yuen Plaza, Sha Tin
- Lei Yue Mun Plaza, Yau Tong
- Lok Fu Plaza, Wang Tau Hom, Wong Tai Sin
- Lucky Plaza, Sha Tin
- Luk Yeung Galleria, Tsuen Wan
- Ma On Shan Plaza, Ma On Shan
- Man Yee Building, Central
- Maritime Bay Commercial Centre, Hang Hau
- Maritime Square, Tsing Yi Island
- MediLink Square, Yau Ma Tei
- MegaBox, Kowloon Bay
- Metro City Plaza, Tseung Kwan O
- Metro Town, Tseung Kwan O
- Metroplaza, Kwai Chung
- MOSTown, Ma On Shan
- Mikiki, San Po Kong
- Ming Tak Shopping Centre, Tseung Kwan O
- Miramall, Tsim Sha Tsui
- MOKO, Mong Kok
- Nan Fung Plaza, Hang Hau
- Nan Fung Centre, Tsuen Wan
- New Jade Shopping Arcade, Chai Wan
- New Town Plaza, Sha Tin
- Olympian City, Tai Kok Tsui
- On Tat Shopping Centre, On Tat
- OP Mall, Tsuen Wan
- The ONE, Tsim Sha Tsui
- Pacific Place, Admiralty
- Panda Place, Tsuen Wan
- Park Central, Tseung Kwan O
- Pioneer Centre, Prince Edward
- Plaza Hollywood, Diamond Hill
- PopCorn, Tseung Kwan O
- The Pulse, Repulse Bay
- QRE Plaza, Wan Chai
- Sha Tin Centre and Sha Tin Plaza, Sha Tin
- Shui Chuen O Plaza, Sha Tin
- Sino Centre, Mong Kok
- Siu Sai Wan Plaza, Siu Sai Wan
- Skyline Plaza, Tsuen Wan
- Stanley Plaza, Stanley
- The Sun Arcade, Tsim Sha Tsui
- Tai Po Mega Mall, Tai Po
- Tai Wo Plaza, Tai Po
- Tak Tin Plaza, Kwun Tong
- Telford Plaza, Kowloon Bay
- Times Square, Causeway Bay
- Tin Yiu Plaza, Yuen Long
- TKO Gateway, Hang Hau
- Tseung Kwan O Plaza, Tseung Kwan O
- Tsuen Wan Plaza, Tsuen Wan
- Tuen Mun Town Plaza, Tuen Mun
- Tze Wan Shan Shopping Centre, Tsz Wan Shan
- Uptown Plaza, Tai Po
- Upper Ngau Tau Kok Estate Shopping Centre, Ngau Tau Kok
- V City, Tuen Mun
- V Walk, Nam Cheong
- West 9 Zone Kids, Mong Kok
- Wo Che Plaza, Sha Tin
- Worfu, North Point
- Whampoa World, Whampoa Garden, Hung Hom
- Temple Mall, Wong Tai Sin
- Windsor House, Causeway Bay
- wwwtc, Causeway Bay
- Yat Tung Shopping Centre, Tung Chung
- YOHO Mall, Yuen Long

== See also ==
- Shopping in Hong Kong
- List of buildings and structures in Hong Kong
