= Fashion Walk =

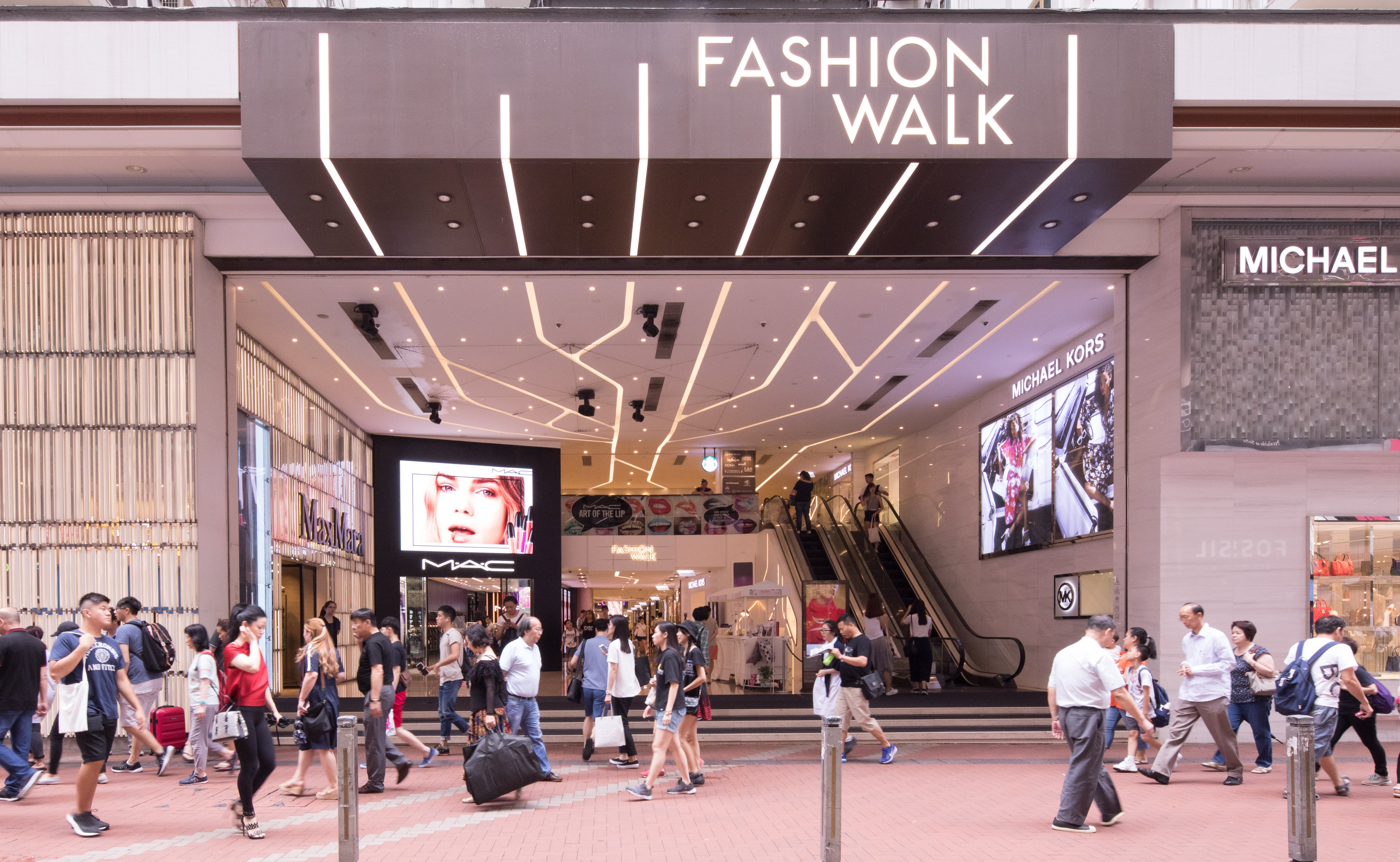
- Entrance to the mall in 2017
- Location: Hong Kong
- Coordinates: 22.280452°N 114.185436°E
- Opened: 1998; 28 years ago
- Developer: Hang Lung Properties
- Num. of stores: over 100 stores
- Floor area: sqft
- Website: fashionwalk.com.hk/en

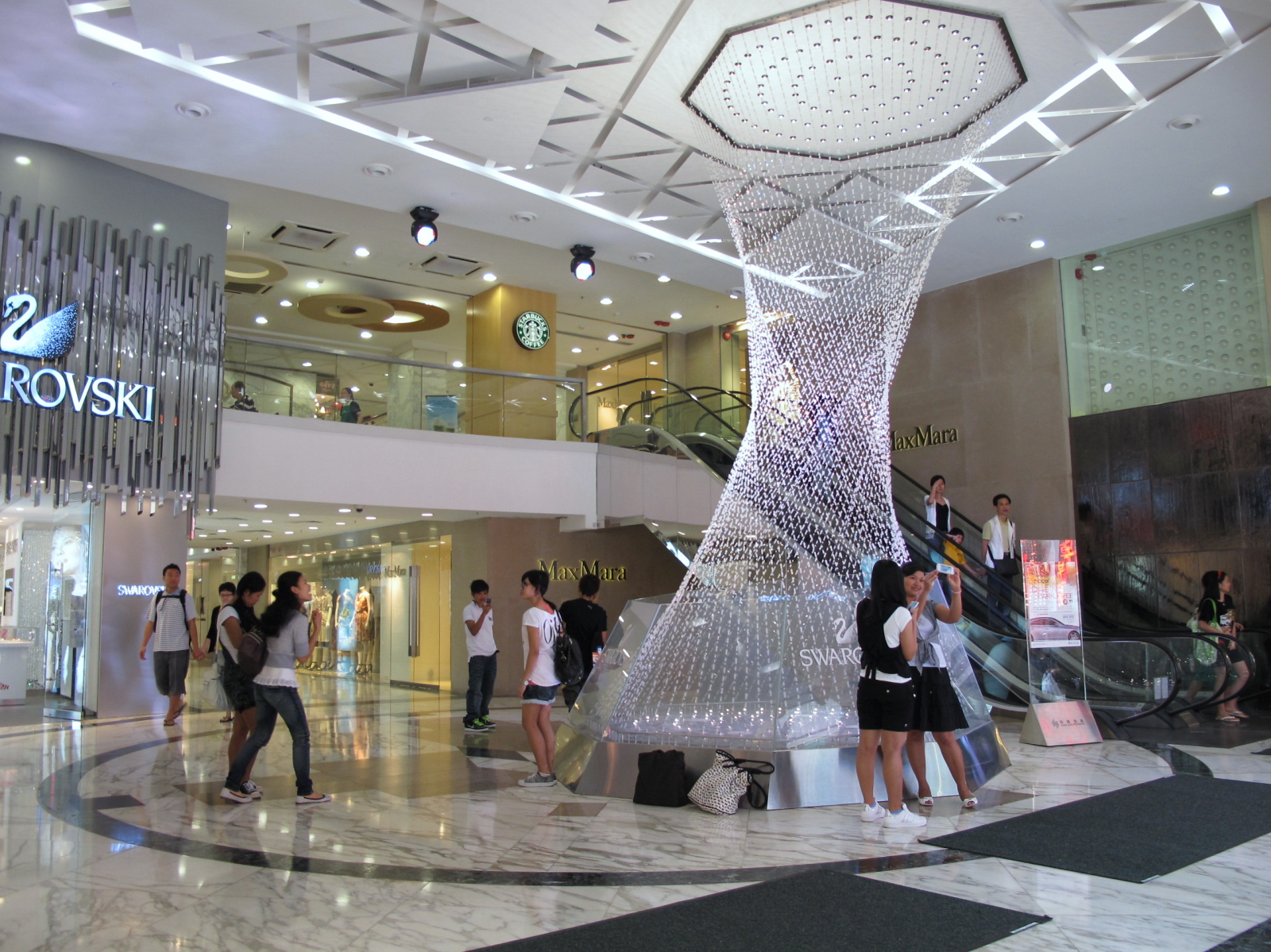
Interior view, May 2010

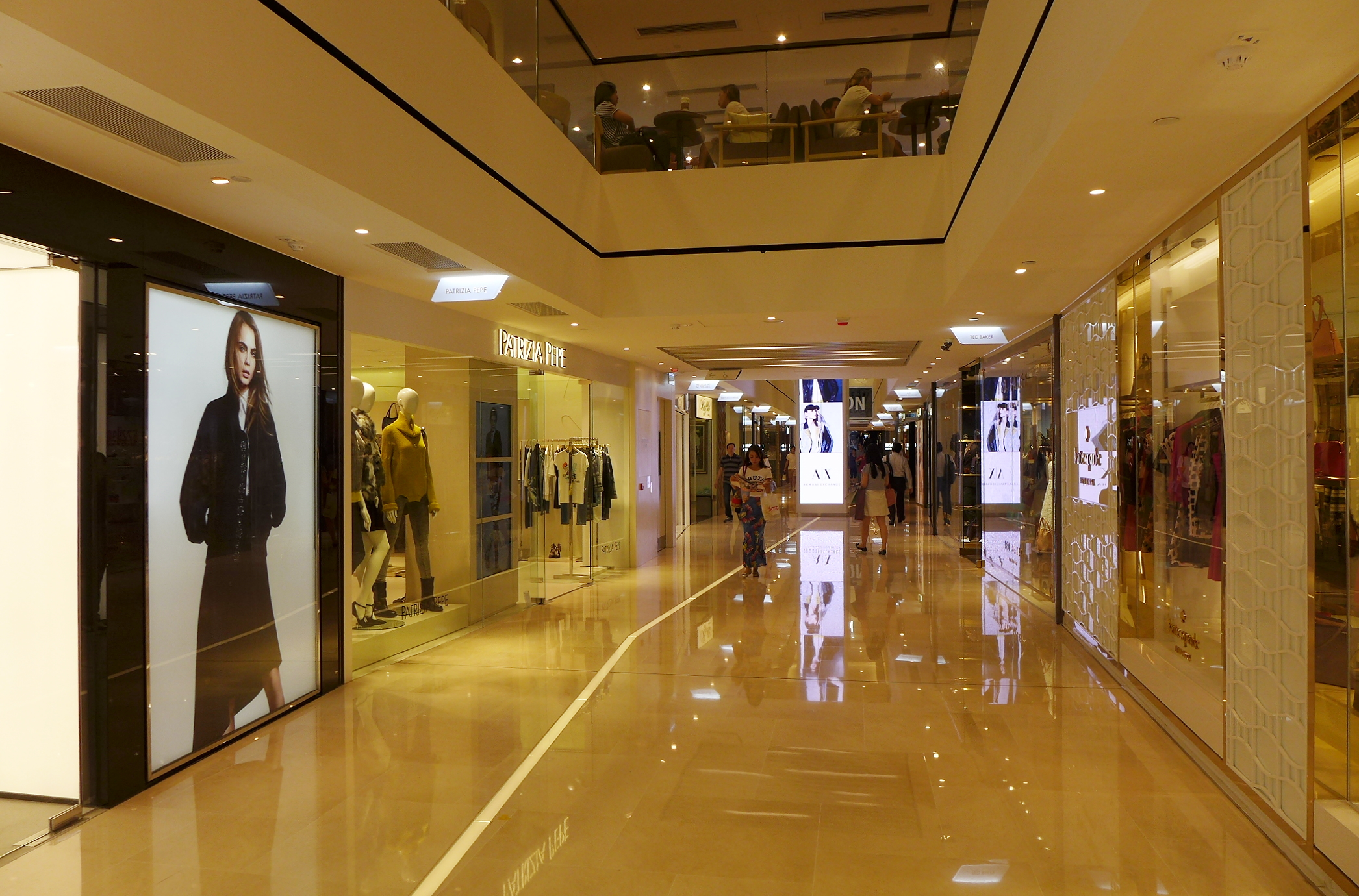
Fashion Walk (September 2015)

Fashion Walk is an indoor shopping centre in Hong Kong. Situated at 11-19 Great George Street in Causeway Bay, occupying the podium levels of the Great George Building, the Paterson Building and Riviera Mansion on Paterson Street. It also borders Cleveland St, Kingston St and Gloucester Rd. Prior to its opening in 1998, it was a notable shopping ground for famous franchises and affluent brands, with a range of eateries and restaurants, and housing one of the many department stores in Hong Kong run by Japanese Department Store, Daimaru.

== History ==
From 2014, Fashion Walk has launched its first renovation works, led by OVAL Partnership, an international construction group, embellishing Fashion Walk with new dynamic lighting. Simultaneously launching a number of concept stores, including the largest Log-On on Hong Kong Island, a Michael Kors full-collection flagship store, an all new concept store by Max Mara based on 'practical luxury', a Vivienne Tam store based on the 'Opera Girl' collection and featuring the first Starbucks with a dessert menu. Renovation works ended in December 2014.

=== Tenants ===
Many well-known international fashion brands have landed Flagship Stores at Fashion Walk. Including the following: adidas Originals, COMME Des Garcons, droog, D-mop, Fjällräven, Francfranc, Hysteric Glamour, JUICE, Kate Spade New York, Log-On, Max Mara, McQ Alexander McQueen, Michael Kors, Mono Monoものもの, Nike, Sandro, Shine, Studious, Ted Baker, Thomas Sabo, Vivienne Tam, Vivienne Westwood, Y-3, Y'sand Zucca.

A number of local and international eateries have landed at Fashion Walk ranging from Western to Asian cuisines. These include: Bistro Bloom, Burger Room, Cedele, Coast, Coedo Taproom, EAT it, elBorn, Elephant Grounds, iCremeria, King Ludwig, Lady M, Little Bao Diner, Pokka Cafe, Marbling by Mr. Steak, Pacific Coffee, Simplylife, Starbucks.

== See also ==
- List of shopping centres in Hong Kong
