= Tsok Pok Hang =

Village in Hong Kong

Coordinates: 22.37332°N 114.19464°E

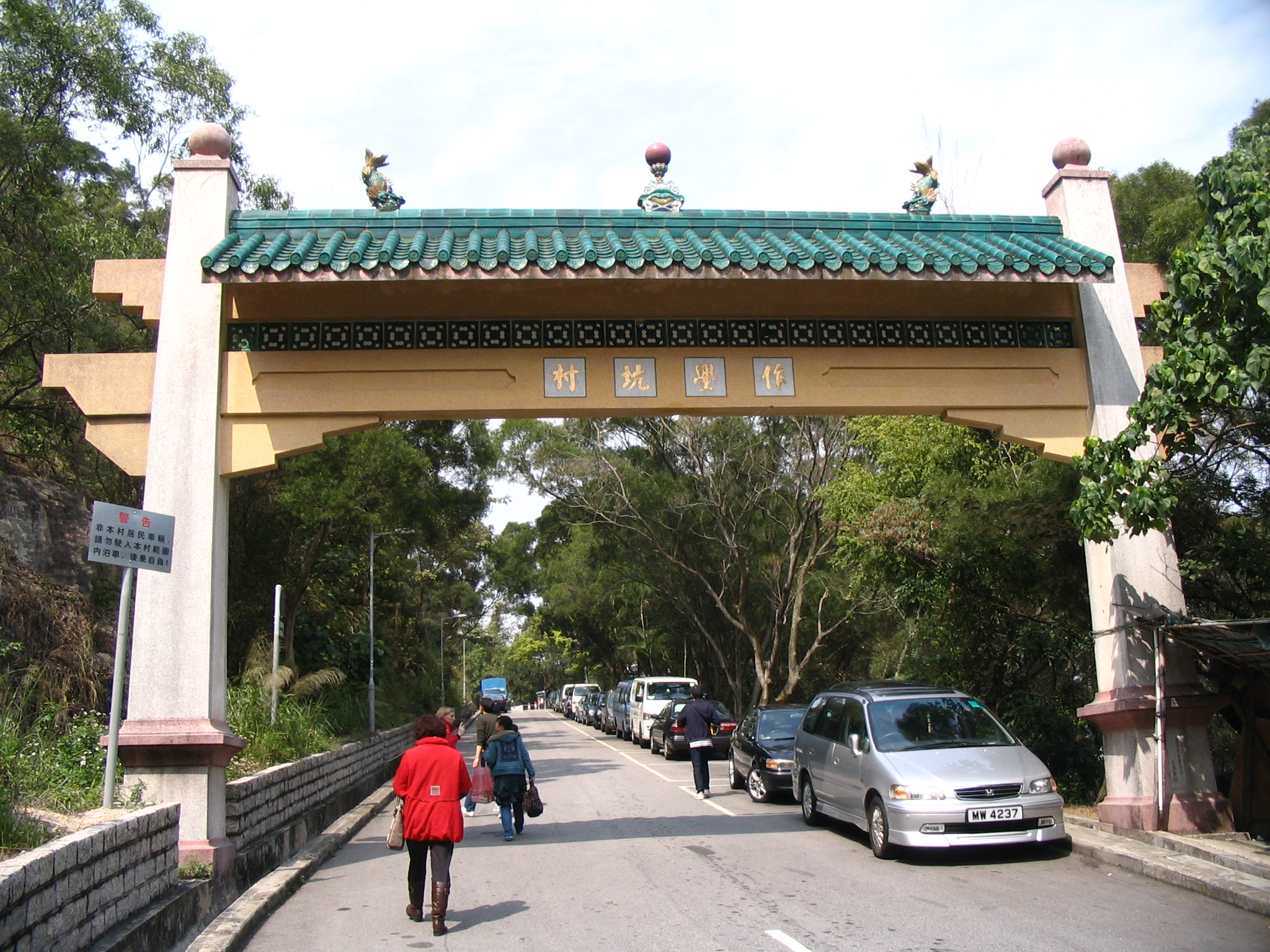
Archway of Tsok Pok Hang Village in February 2008.

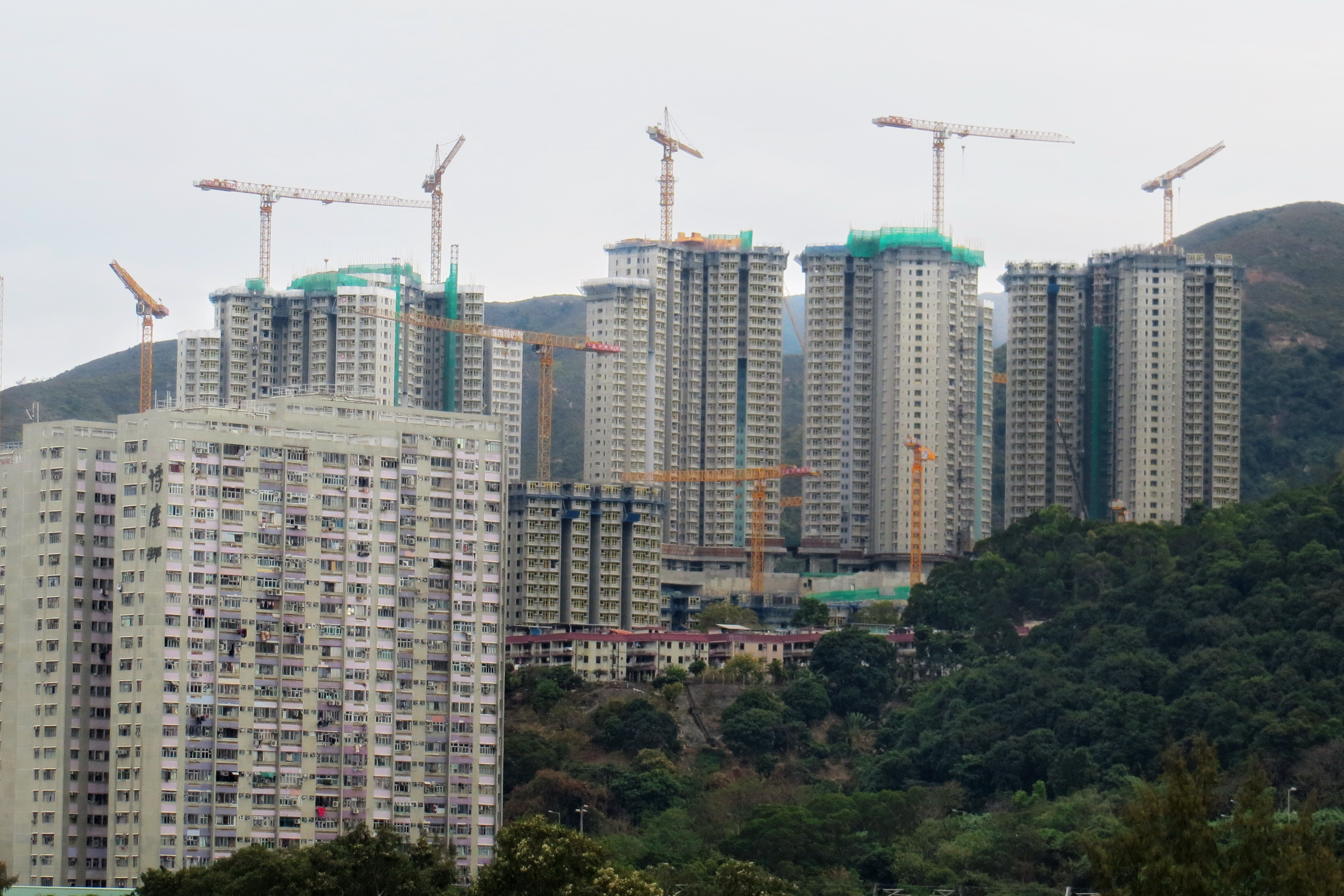
Distant view of Tsok Pok Hang San Tsuen on the hill slope, with Shui Chuen O Estate under construction in the background. The block on the left in the foreground is part of Pok Hong Estate.

Tsok Pok Hang Village (Chinese: 作壆坑村), also referred to as Tsok Pok Hang San Tsuen (作壆坑新村; 'Tsok Pok Hang New Village') or Tsok Pok Hang Resite Area, is a village in Sha Tin District, Hong Kong.

== Administration ==
Tsok Pok Hang Resite Area is a recognized village under the New Territories Small House Policy. For electoral purposes, Tsok Pok Hang San Tsuen is part of the Jat Chuen constituency.

== History ==
Tsok Pok Hang was previously named Sok Pok Hang (塑壆坑; 'Mud Bund Stream').

== See also ==
- Kau Yeuk (Sha Tin)
- Lion Rock Country Park
- Scout Association of Hong Kong
