= Concord Square =

Concord Square may refer to:

- Concord Square (Hong Kong), China
- Concord Square (Szczecin), Poland
- Concord Square Historic District, Framingham, Massachusetts, United States
- Place de la Concorde, Paris, France
