= Shui Chuen O (constituency) =

Electoral district in Shatin, Hong Kong

- 水泉澳
- Elected constituency for the Sha Tin District Council
- Boundary of Shui Chuen O in Sha Tin District
- District: Sha Tin
- Legislative Council constituency: New Territories North East
- Population: 20,294 (2019)
- Electorate: 8,491 (2019)

Current constituency
- Created: 2019
- Number of members: One
- Member: Vacant
- Created from: Jat Min

Shui Chuen O (Chinese: 水泉澳) is one of the 41 constituencies in the Sha Tin District.

Created for the 2019 District Council elections, the constituency returns one district councillor to the Sha Tin District Council, with an election every four years.

Shui Chuen O loosely covers part of public housing estate Shui Chuen O Estate in Sha Tin. It has projected population of 20,294.

== Councillors represented ==
Election	Member	Party
2019	Lo Tak-ming→Vacant	Community Sha Tin→Independent

== Election results ==
=== 2010s ===
Sha Tin District Council Election, 2019: Shui Chuen O
Party	Candidate	Votes	%	±%
Nonpartisan	Lo Tak-ming	3,101	50.15	
FTU (DAB)	Tang Ka-piu	3,069	49.63	
Nonpartisan	Lui Yick-fong	14	0.23	
Majority		32	0.52	
Turnout		6,192	72.96	
Nonpartisan win (new seat)				
