= Skyline Plaza =

Skyline Plaza may refer to:

- Skyline Plaza (Frankfurt)
- Skyline Plaza (Hong Kong)
- The building involved in the Skyline Plaza collapse of 1973, in Fairfax County, Virginia
