= Zucca =

Zucca may refer to:

== People ==
- André Zucca
- Giovanni Zucca
- Jacopo del Zucca
- Mana-Zucca
- Rita Zucca
- Vittorio Zucca

== Other uses ==
- Zucca, a synonym of the genus Momordica
- Zucca (aperitif)
