= Fortune City One =

Shopping centre in Sha Tin, Hong Kong

Coordinates: 22.38654°N 114.20382°E

置富第一城 Fortune City One

Fortune City One (Chinese: 置富第一城), formerly known as the City One Shatin Property, is one of the two shopping centres of City One, Sha Tin, New Territories, Hong Kong. It is owned by Fortune Real Estate Investment Trust, which also owns Fortune City One Plus, the estate's other shopping centre.

== Transportation ==
MTR

- Tuen Ma line City One station

Kowloon Motor Bus

- 49X - Sha Tin (Kwong Yuen) ↔ Tsing Yi Ferry
- 73A - Sha Tin (Yu Chui Court) ↔ Fanling (Wah Ming)
- 80K - Sun Chui ↔ Yu Chui Court
- 82C - Sha Tin (Kwong Yuen) ↔ Hong Kong Science Park Phase III (Rush Time Service)
- 82K - Wong Nai Tau ↔ Mei Lam
- 82X - Ravana Garden ↺ Wong Tai Sin
- 84M - Chevalier Garden ↔ Lok Fu
- 85A - Kwong Yuen ↔ Kowloon City Ferry
- 86 - Wong Nai Tau ↔ Mei Foo
- 89X - Sha Tin station ↔ Kwun Tong (Tsui Ping Road)
- 240X - Wong Nai Tau ↔ Kwai Hing station (Rush Time Service)
- 281A - Sha Tin (Kwong Yuen) ↔ Kowloon station

Long Win Bus

- A41 - Airport (Ground Transportation Centre) ↔ Sha Tin (Yu Chui Court)
- N42 - Tung Chung station ↔ Ma On Shan (Yiu On) (Midnight Service)
- NA41 - Hong Kong-Zhuhai-Macao Bridge Hong Kong Port ↔ Sha Tin (Shui Chuen O) (Midnight Service)

Cross Harbour Tunnel Bus

- 182 - Yu Chui Court ↔ Central (Macau Ferry)
- N182 - Sha Tin (Kwong Yuen) ↔ Central (Macau Ferry)
- 682B - Shui Chuen O Estate ↔ Chai Wan (East) (Rush Time Service)
- 682C - City One Shatin ↔ North Point (Rush Time Service)
