= Killeen Mall =

- Location: Killeen, Texas, United States
- Coordinates: 31.0931°N 97.7167°W
- Opened: March 25, 1981
- Developer: Paul Broadhead & Associates
- Owner: The Rocky Companies
- Num. of stores: 100
- Num. of anchor tenants: 7
- Floor area: 557,418 sq ft (51,785.8 m^{2})
- Floors: 1
- Website: killeenmall.com

Killeen Mall is a 557,418-square-foot (51,785.8 m^{2}) shopping mall located in Killeen, Texas, located on 63.1 acres (25.5 ha). It was acquired by Kohan Retail Investment Group and Rocky Companies in February 2024.

== History ==
The mall opened on March 25, 1981. It was developed by Paul Broadhead & Associates. The mall has 100 stores. The original anchors were Bealls, Sears, and O. G. Wilson Catalog Showroom, owned by Zale Corporation (later Best Products).

Killeen Mall is one of two regional malls in Bell County, with the other being Temple Mall, in nearby Temple.

On December 28, 2018, Sears announced that the Killeen Mall location would be closing in March 2019 as part of a plan to close 80 stores nationwide. The former Sears eventually became a second Dillard's. After Dillard’s opened their new location in the former Sears, they opted to keep their old location at the mall and continue to operate two locations. On September 16, 2021, Mega Furniture opened a furniture store in the former Dillard’s space. However, by 2024, the store had closed.

In February 2024, Kohan Retail Investment Group bought the Killeen Mall.

As of 2025 the mall announced additions of new stores to the remaining vacant anchor space and other areas on the south side of the mall property. HomeGoods, TJ Maxx and Five Below announced they would open in 2026 in the vacant Mega Furniture space. Construction on these three new stores set to go into the anchor space started in November, 2025. All three stores opened in April, 2026.

=== 2024 truck incident and shooting ===
On December 21, 2024, 53-year-old John Darrel Schultz (October 16, 1971 – December 21, 2024) of Kempner, Texas, drove a fifth-generation 2019 to 2024 Dodge Ram 1500 pickup truck through the front doors of the JCPenney store in the mall. Schultz was being pursued by police after an officer attempted to pull him over near the intersection of Interstate 35 and Interstate 14 in Belton for driving erratically and potentially under the influence. Schultz led officers to Killeen Mall where he veered into the parking lot of the mall before crashing through the glass front doors of the JCPenney.

Schultz injured five people inside the store, including four who required hospitalization, between the ages of 6 and 75-years-old and was pursued on foot by officers in the store. Schultz allegedly drove several hundred yards inside the store before a Texas Department of Public Safety trooper, a Killeen police officer, and three off-duty officers, one of whom was working as a security guard for the mall, opened fire on Schultz, killing him. False claims of an active shooter at the mall spread online.
