= Giovanni Zucca =

Italian footballer

Personal information
- Date of birth: 11 December 1907
- Place of birth: Sestri Ponente, Italy
- Date of death: 10 December 1975
- Position: Goalkeeper

Senior career*
| Years | Team | Apps | (Gls) |
| 1928–1930 | Sestrese | | |
| 1930–1931 | Liguria | 27 | (0) |
| 1931–1932 | Roma | 1 | (0) |
| 1932–1933 | Roma (B team) | | |
| 1933–1934 | Sampierdarenese | 0 | (0) |
| 1934–1936 | Roma | 1 | (0) |
- * Club domestic league appearances and goals

Giovanni Zucca (Italian pronunciation: [dʒoˈvanni dˈdzukka; tˈtsukka]; born 11 December 1907) was an Italian professional football player from Sestri Ponente.

He played two games in two seasons in the Serie A for A.S. Roma.
