= QRE Plaza =

Building in Wan Chai, Hong Kong

Coordinates: 22°16′29″N 114°10′19″E

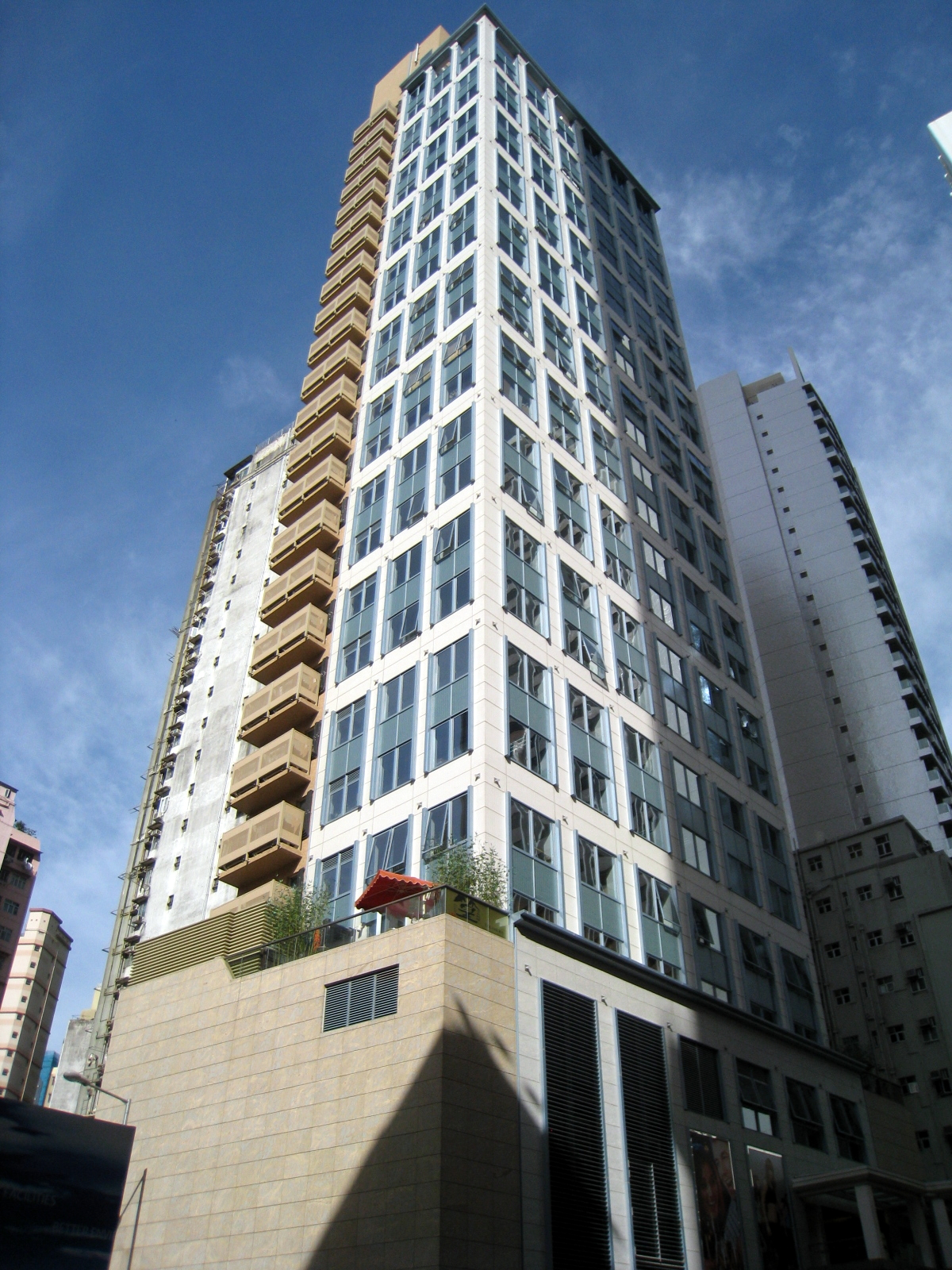

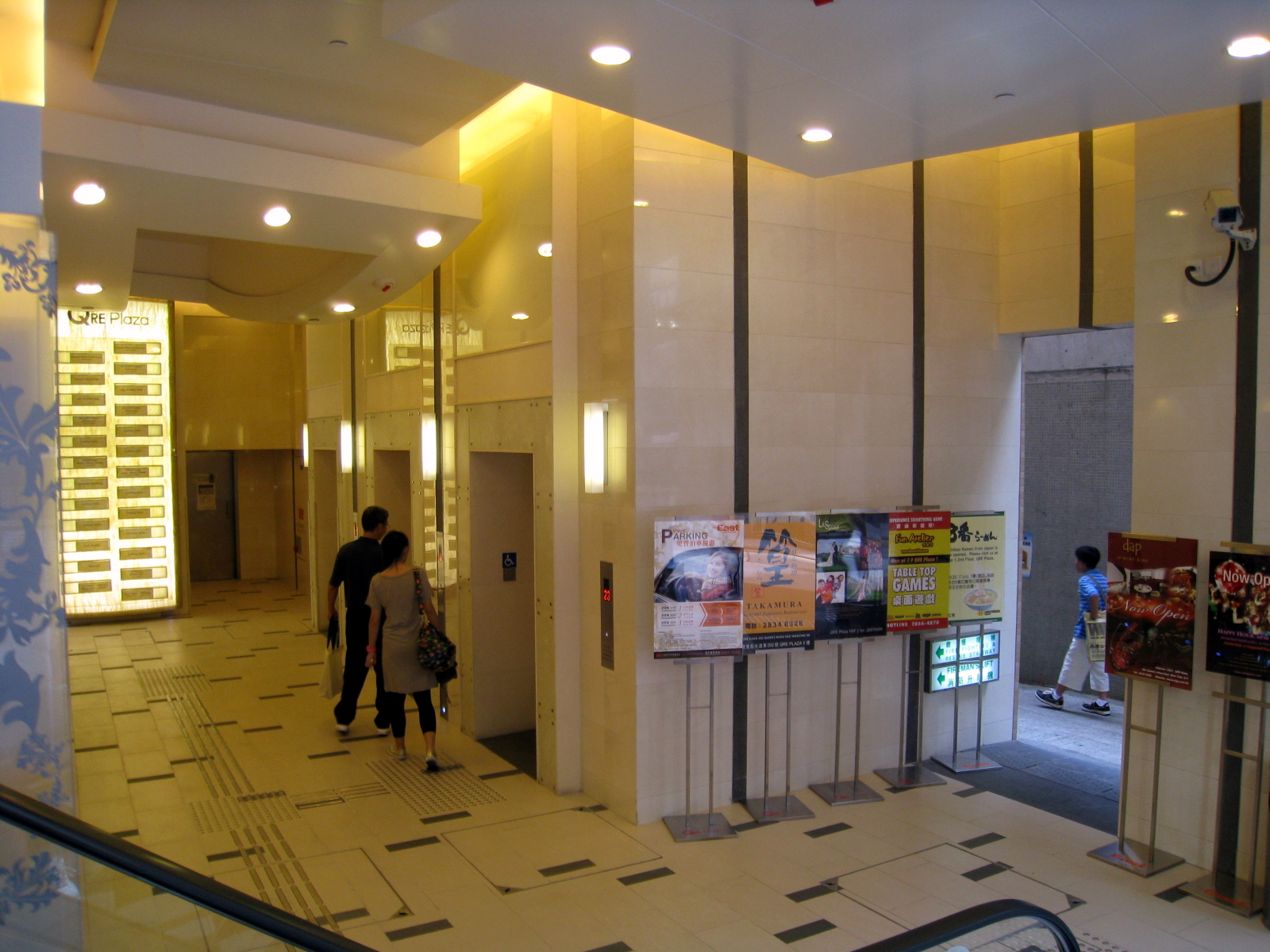
QRE Plaza lobby

Hopewell Centre or QRE Plaza is a 25-storey building located at No. 202 Queen's Road East, Wan Chai, Hong Kong, developed by Hopewell Holdings. The plaza was completed in 2007 and contains a shopping centre, restaurants and health clinics. QRE Plaza measures nearly 89 metres (292 ft) in height, and has a gross floor area (GFA) of about 77,000 square feet (7,200 m^{2}).

== Tenants ==
QRE Plaza was formerly home to Hong Kong's only Fatburger. Quemo Hong Kong, inaugurated in the spring of 2013, is a Spanish restaurant serving a capacity of about 50. It is situated on the fifth floor and contains a patio. On the seventh floor is a branch of Happy Foot, a reflexology clinic, on the nineteenth floor is the VIM Pilates Studio, and on the twentieth floor is the Action Sports Academy. On the ninth floor is the W28 Steak House.

The Zummer restaurant serves French and Italian cuisine on the upper floors, although it is a popular eating establishment. On the rooftop is the Habitat Lounge and cocktail bar, with a modern, contemporary design and dim blue lighting. It contains two outdoor terraces.
