= Temple Mall =

Shopping mall in Temple, Texas

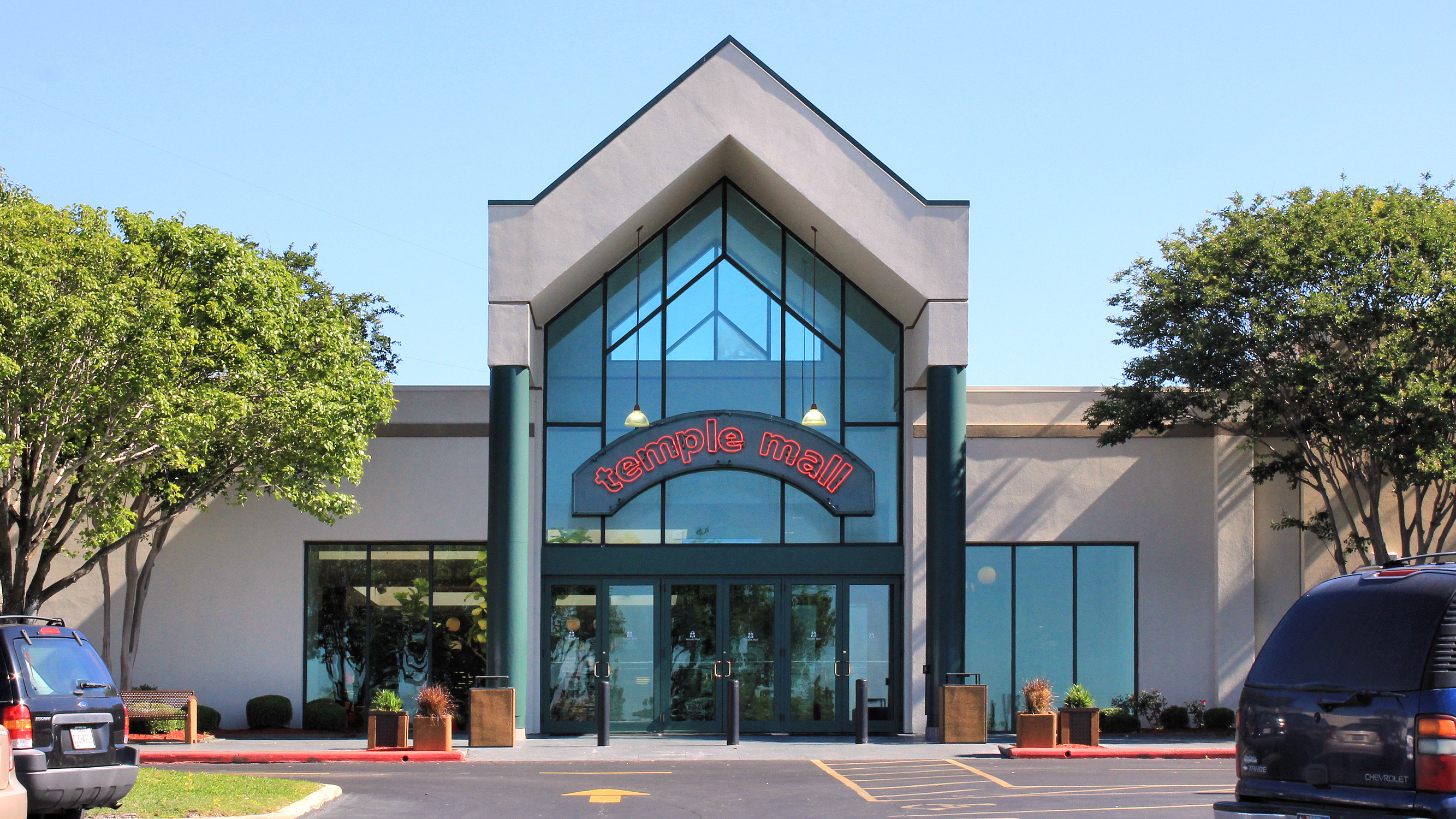
- An entrance to Temple Mall
- Location: (United States) Temple, Texas
- Coordinates: 31.0707°N 97.3670°W
- Opened: 1976
- Owner: Kohan Retail Investment Group
- Num. of stores: 60
- Num. of anchor tenants: 5
- Floor area: 555,400 ft^{2}
- Floors: 1
- Parking: 2,557 spaces
- Website: Official website

Temple Mall is one of two regional malls in Bell County, Texas, United States - the other being Killeen Mall, in nearby Killeen. Temple Mall contains accommodation for four major anchor stores and 57 tenants, and has approximately 555,400 square feet (51,600 m^{2}) of gross leasable area.

== History ==
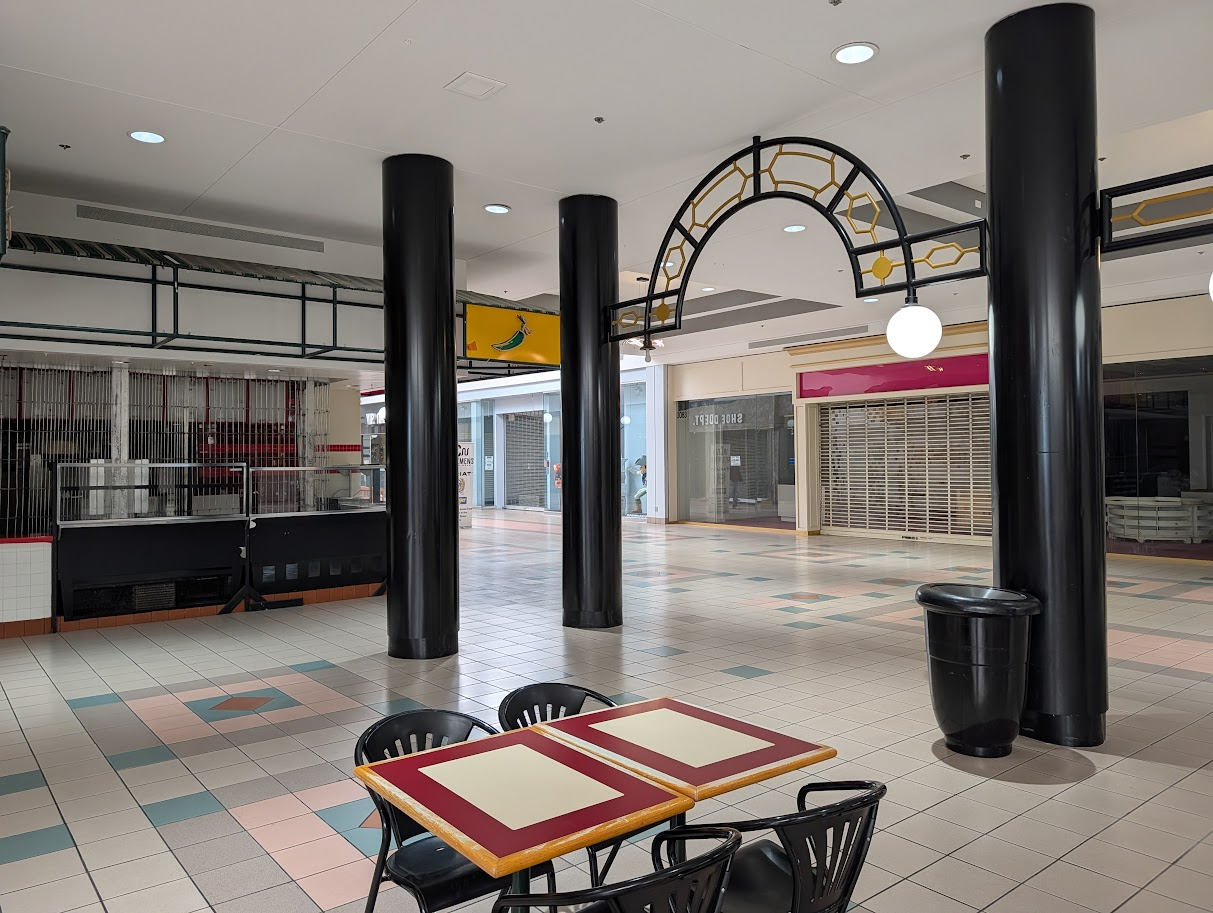
Food court (2026)

Sears had an anchor store that was replaced in 1995 by Foley's. Foley's became Macy's in 2006. Steve & Barry’s closed in 2009 due to bankruptcy. Macy's closed in 2016; Dillard's had a store that moved across the mall to the former Macy's space in 2017. JCPenney closed in March 2021 as part of a plan to close 15 stores nationwide. Premiere Cinemas closed on December 25, 2022. After the closure of JCPenney, Dillard's was the only anchor store left until 2023, when Floor & Decor opened in the former JCPenney building. A car wash known as Today’s Car Wash also opened in 2023 in part of the former JCPenney parking lot. Planet Fitness was a junior anchor of the Dillard's original store until Mega Furniture also opened a furniture store utilizing the remaining vacant Dillard's space. In 2024, Xtreme Jump Adventure Park opened in the former Steve & Barry's store. Cattlemen's Western Wear opened in the former Fuddruckers space in 2024.

Kohan Retail Investment Group purchased the mall in late October 2021. The price was not disclosed; at one time the mall was listed for US$10 million. Work on fixing maintenance issues with the mall has been ongoing in order to meet building code requirements by request of the City of Temple in 2024.

The location has also faced numerous safety violations, leading to its temporary closure in September 2024.. Earlier that year, local media reported that Kohan Retail Investment Group had not paid $41,023 in water bills, which nearly led the city to disconnect the utility service.

In July 2025, RockStep Capital expressed interest in purchasing the mall with the hopes of revitalizing it. It withdrew from the deal in fourth quarter of 2025.

On May 22, 2026, the city of Temple issued a 30-day notice of potential closure due to "continued fire and life safety deficiencies identified through inspections conducted by the Temple Fire Marshal's Office". Deficiencies documented during inspections include an inoperable fire pump, multiple impaired or inoperable sprinkler systems, impaired or inoperable fire alarm panels, impaired or inoperable exit and egress components, electrical hazards, and additional fire code violations.
