= Tsuen Wan Plaza =

Building in Tsuen Wan, Hong Kong

Tsuen Wan Plaza 荃灣廣場
- Location: Tsuen Wan, Tsuen Wan District, New Territories, Hong Kong
- Coordinates: 22°22′14″N 114°06′41″E
- Address: 4-30 Tai Pa Street
- Opened: February 1992; 34 years ago
- Developer: Sun Hung Kai Properties
- Manager: Hong Yip Service Co. Ltd
- Architect: 新基建築有限公司 or New base Construction Company Limited (if translated)
- Num. of stores: 170
- Floors: 7
- Website: www.tsuenwanplaza.com.hk/eng/

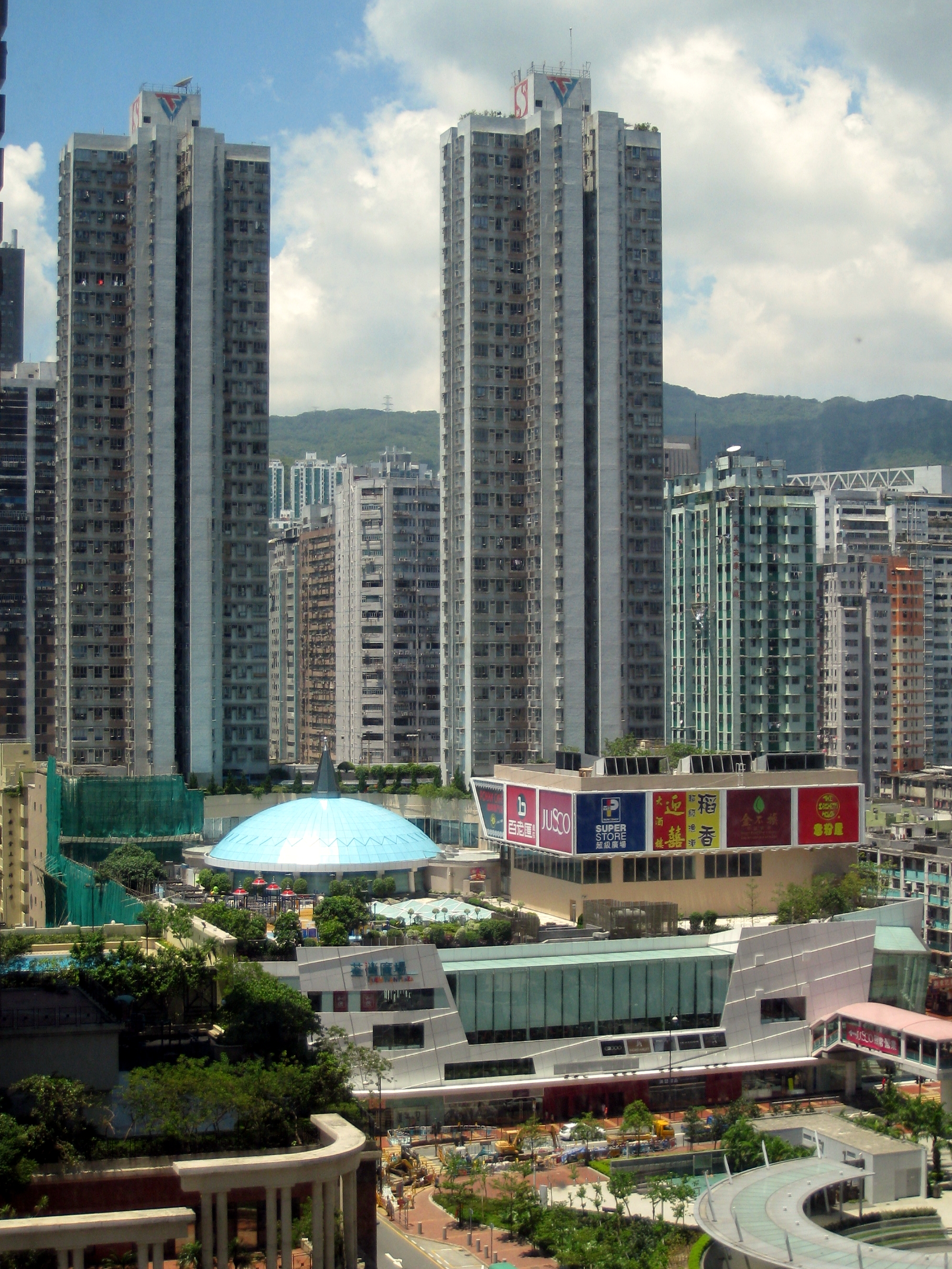
Tsuen Wan Plaza in August 2008

Tsuen Wan Plaza (Chinese: 荃灣廣場) is a private housing estate and shopping mall in Tsuen Wan, New Territories, Hong Kong, located near the MTR Tsuen Wan West station, Tsuen Wan Ferry Pier, Nina Tower, Skyline Plaza, Citywalk and Citywalk 2. It is one of the largest shopping malls in the district. Built on the reclaimed land of the old Tsuen Wan Ferry Pier, it was developed by Sun Hung Kai Properties in 1992. A large-scale renovation was completed from 2005 to 2009.

There are a wide variety of retail shops in the plaza, including a Yata department store replacing the former JUSCO which moved to the nearby Skyline Plaza. Tsuen Wan Plaza also has a variety of restaurants and leisure and entertainment facilities including a Broadway Circuit cinema and a 23,000-square-foot (2,100 m^{2}) outdoor playground.

== Politics ==
Tsuen Wan Plaza is located in Clague Garden constituency of the Tsuen Wan District Council. It was formerly represented by Chan Kim-kam, who was elected in the 2019 elections until July 2021.

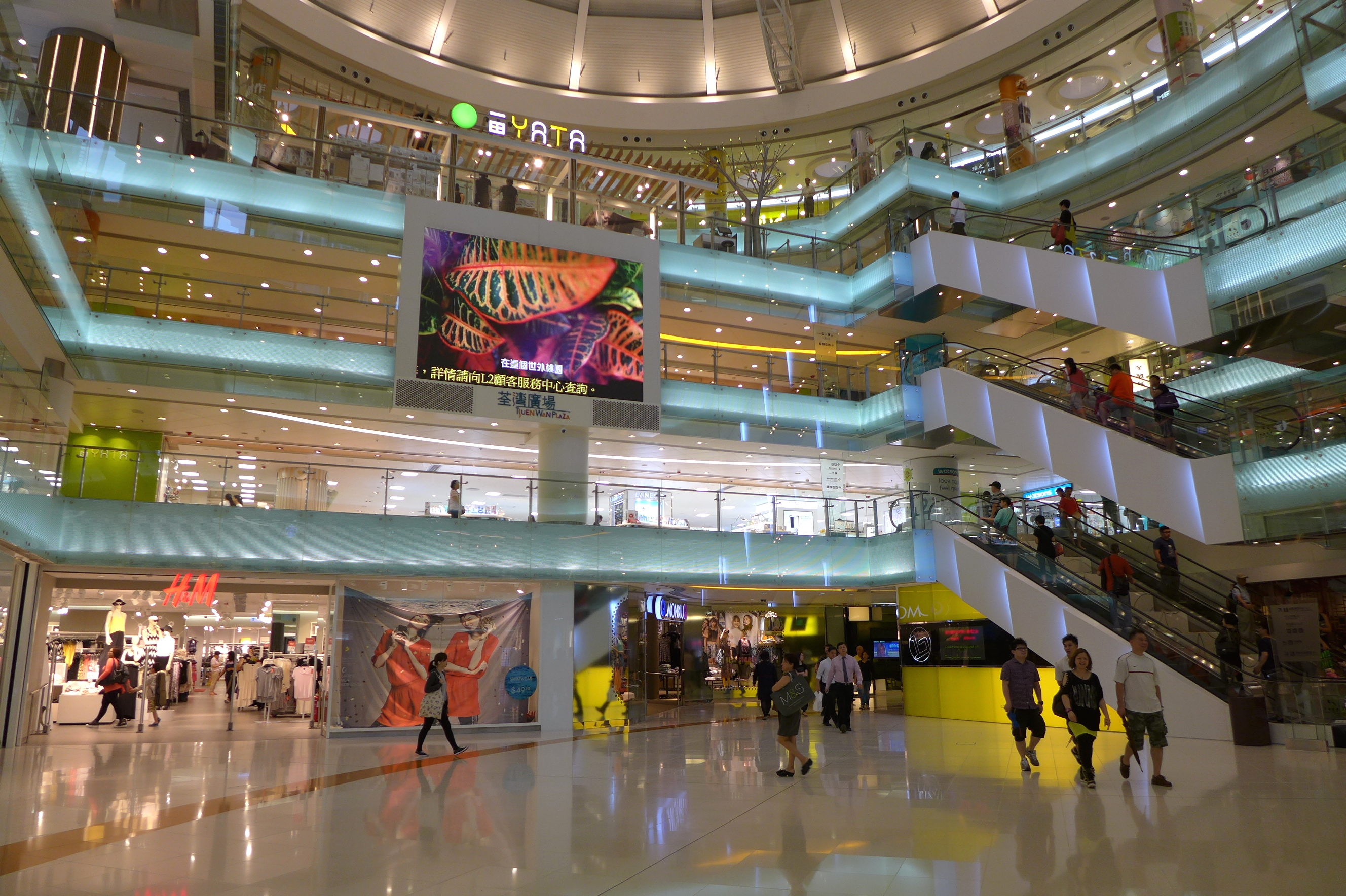
Atrium in Tsuen Wan Plaza in May 2014

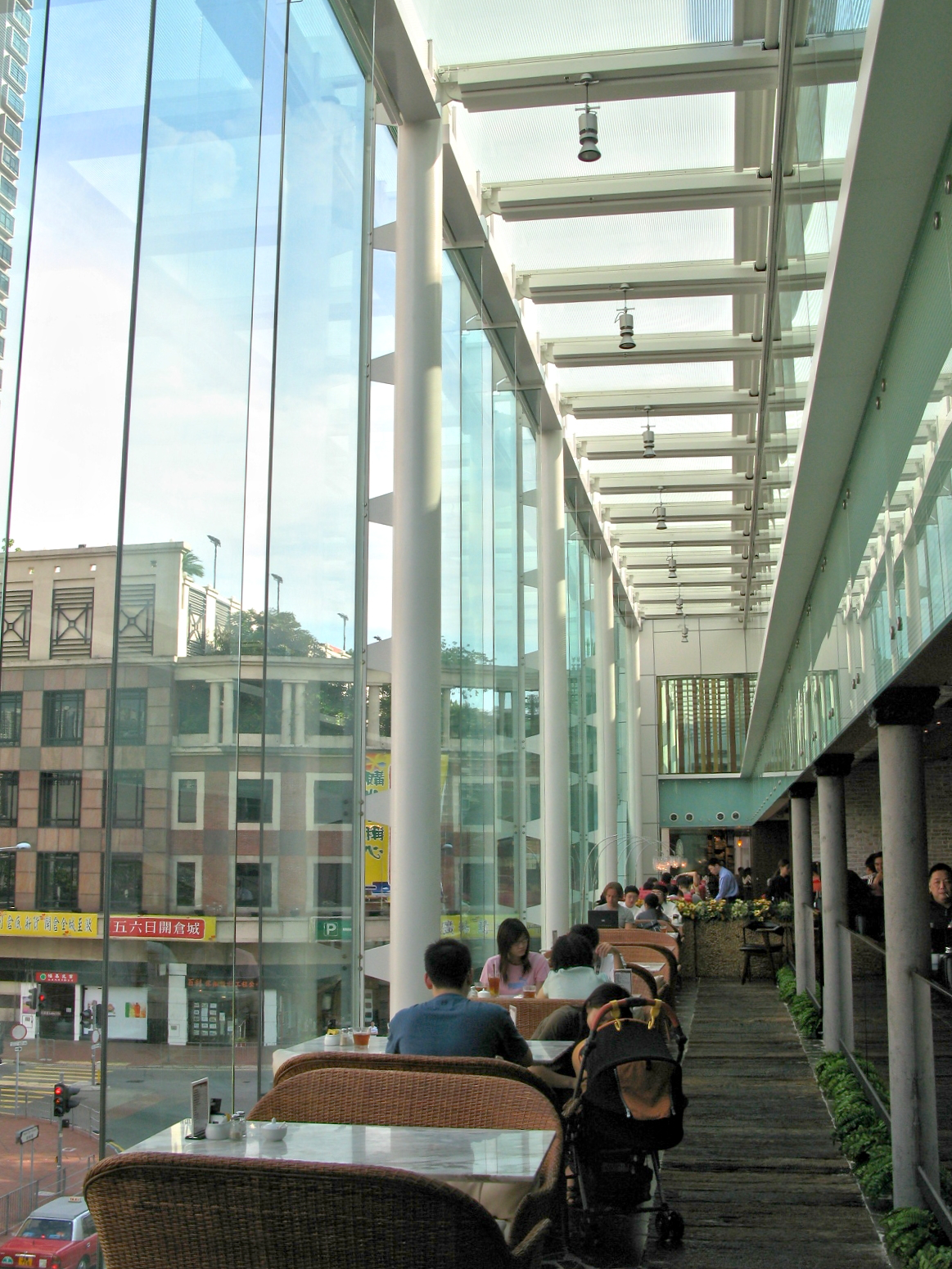
A western restaurant in Tsuen Wan Plaza in July 2007

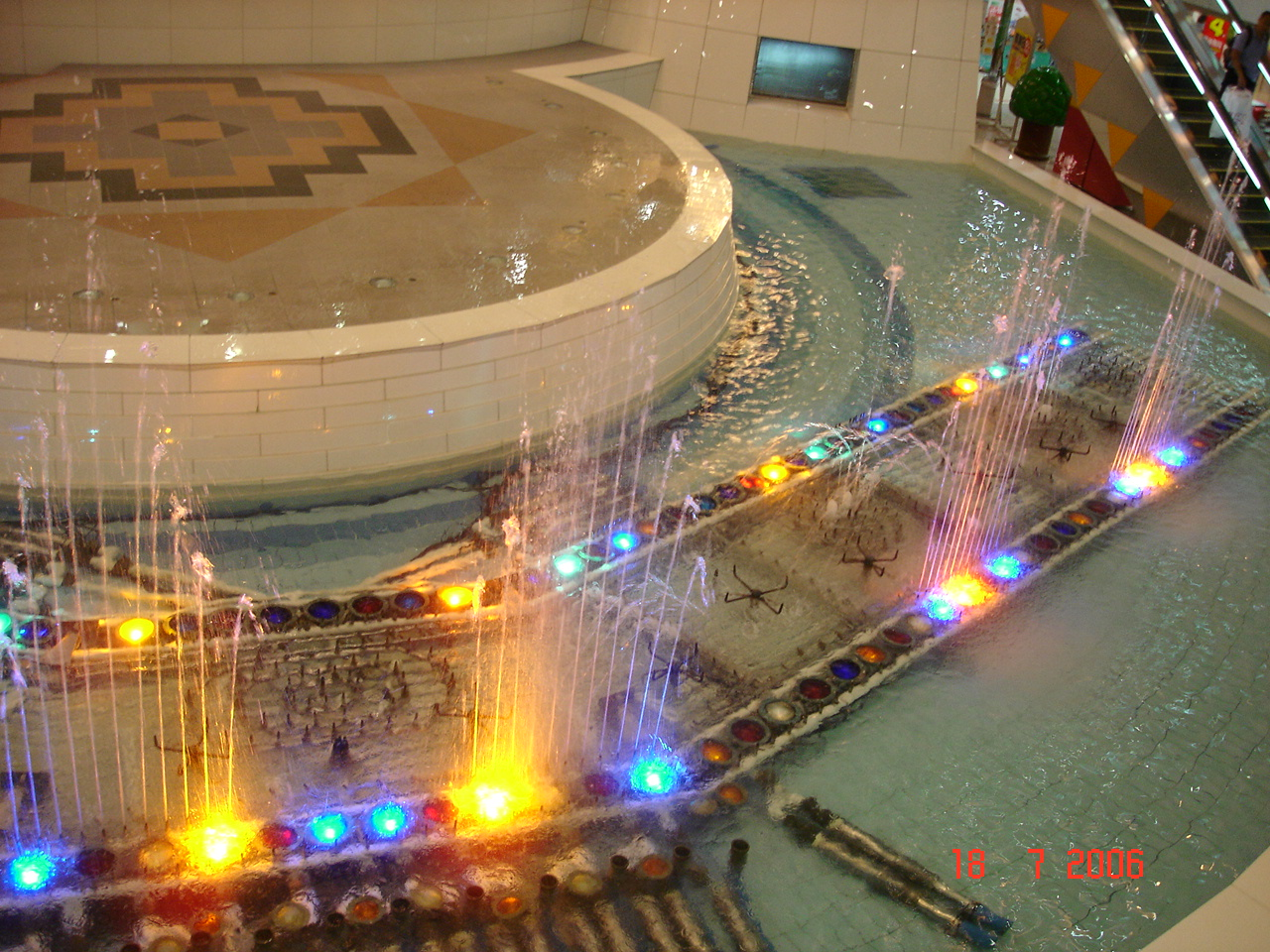
Musical fountain in Tsuen Wan Plaza in July 2006, but removed after renovation

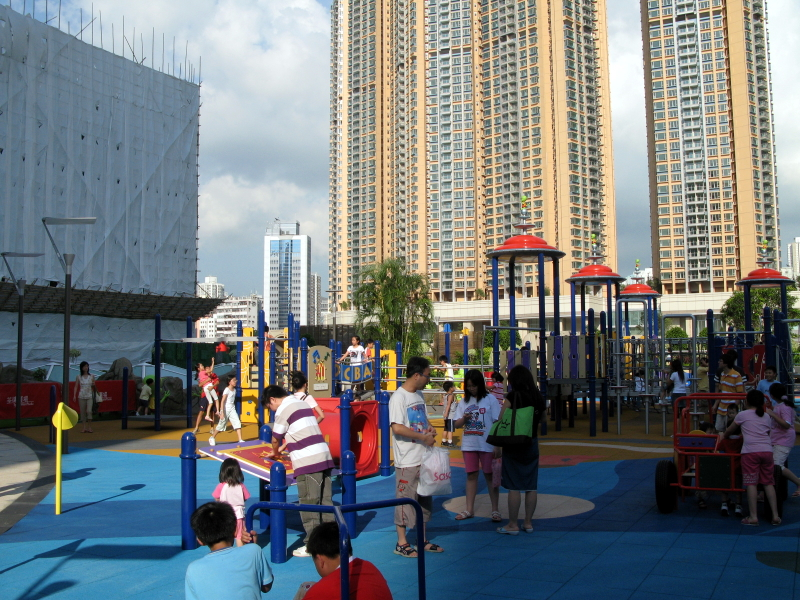
Children's playground in Tsuen Wan Plaza in July 2007

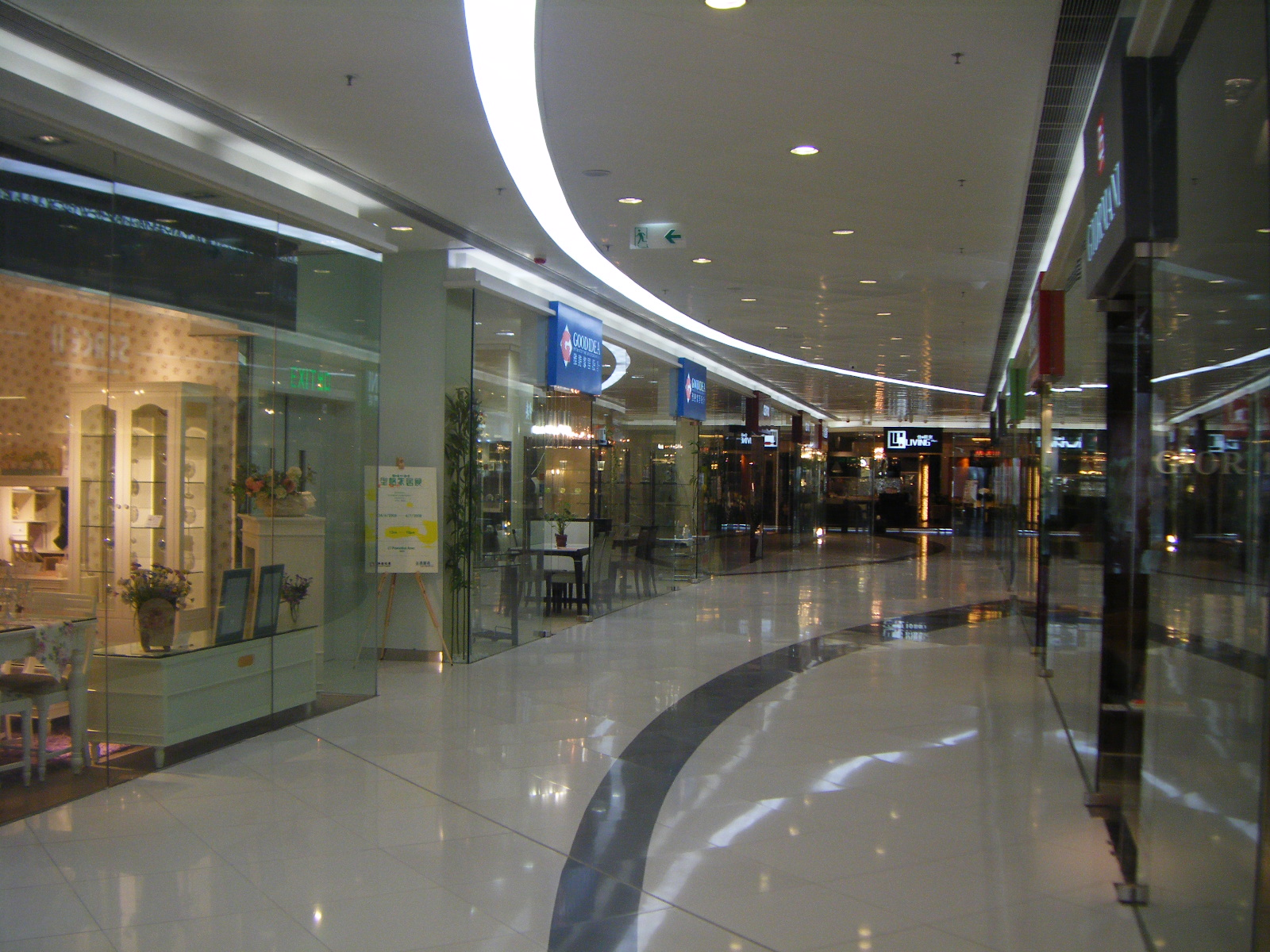
Furniture outlets in Tsuen Wan Plaza in July 2008
