= City One =

Housing estate in Sha Tin, New Territories

Coordinates: 22°23′11″N 114°12′14″E

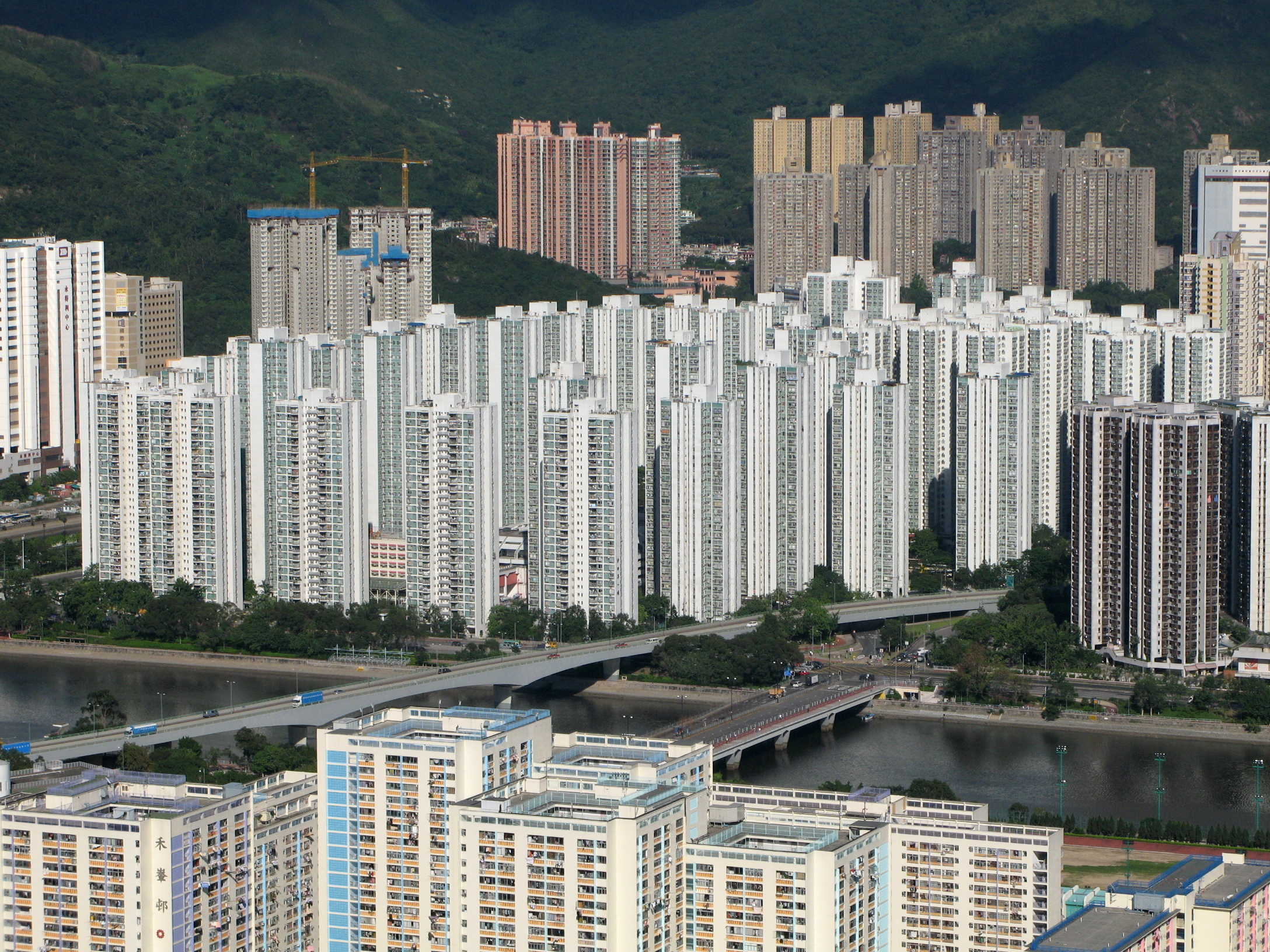
- Overview photo
- Interactive map of City One

General information
- Location: Sha Tin, New Territories; Hong Kong
- Status: Completed
- Category: Private housing estate
- Population: 25,524 (2016)
- No. of blocks: 52
- No. of units: 10,643

City One
- Chinese: 沙田第一城
- Literal meaning: The First City
Transcriptions
Standard Mandarin
- Hanyu Pinyin: Dì Yī Chéng
Yue: Cantonese
- Jyutping: dai6 jat1 sing4
- IPA: [tɐ̀i jɐ́t ɕɪ̏ŋ]

City One Shatin (Chinese: 沙田第一城) is a residential precinct in Sha Tin, New Territories, Hong Kong. The estate occupies approximately 1,800,000 square feet (17 hectares) of land. The estate was named City One as it is on Lot 1, Shatin Town. It has a census area population of 24,758 people. City One is the largest private residential estate in Sha Tin District. There are a total of 52 blocks of residential buildings with 10,642 units. Each tower is about 30 stories with units ranging from 389 square feet (36.1 m^{2}) to an area of 1,018 square feet (94.6 m^{2}), offering different floor plans.

== History ==
City One was an important project of the Government's plan on developing the Sha Tin New Town in 1979. 6,000,000 square feet (56 hectares) of land was reclaimed for the construction of the estate. With massive reclamation, the land which City One was built on was formerly Yuen Chau Kok and the Tide Cove. City One was a joint venture between New World Development, Henderson Land Development, Sun Hung Kai Properties and Cheung Kong Holdings in the 1980s.

== Construction ==
The construction of the City One Residential Apartments was completed in seven stages (completion date):

- Stage One – Blocks 1 to 14 (August 1981)
- Stage Two – Blocks 15 to 23 (June 1982)
- Stage Three – Blocks 29 to 33 (September 1983)
- Stage Four – Blocks 37 to 45 (June 1985)
- Stage Five – Blocks 27 to 28 & 46 to 52 (November 1985)
- Stage Six – Blocks 24 to 26 (September 1986)
- Stage Seven – Blocks 34 to 36 (January 1988)

The property was developed by four major developers led by Henderson Land Development Company Limited.

== Demographics ==
According to the 2011 Population Census, the population of the City One census area was 24,758 people. Approximately 44.2% of the population were male, 93.8% were ethnic Chinese, over 93.6% of residents spoke primarily Cantonese, with 2.9% speaking English as their primary language. International students from China and new immigrants from the mainland mostly made up the 2.2% who speak Mandarin and other varieties of Chinese, making it the third largest language group in the estate, just 0.7% behind English, which is an official language in Hong Kong. City One had an educated population, with over 42% of the population holding a degree, diploma or vocational qualification. This level of education attainment was reflected in the estate's employment patterns: the most popular occupations for employment are Associate professionals (28%), managers and administrators (17.9%) and clerical support workers (16.2%). The median monthly domestic household income was HK$32,000, compared with $20,700 in Hong Kong overall.

According to the 2016 population by-census, the population of City One had risen slightly to 25,524.

== Amenities ==
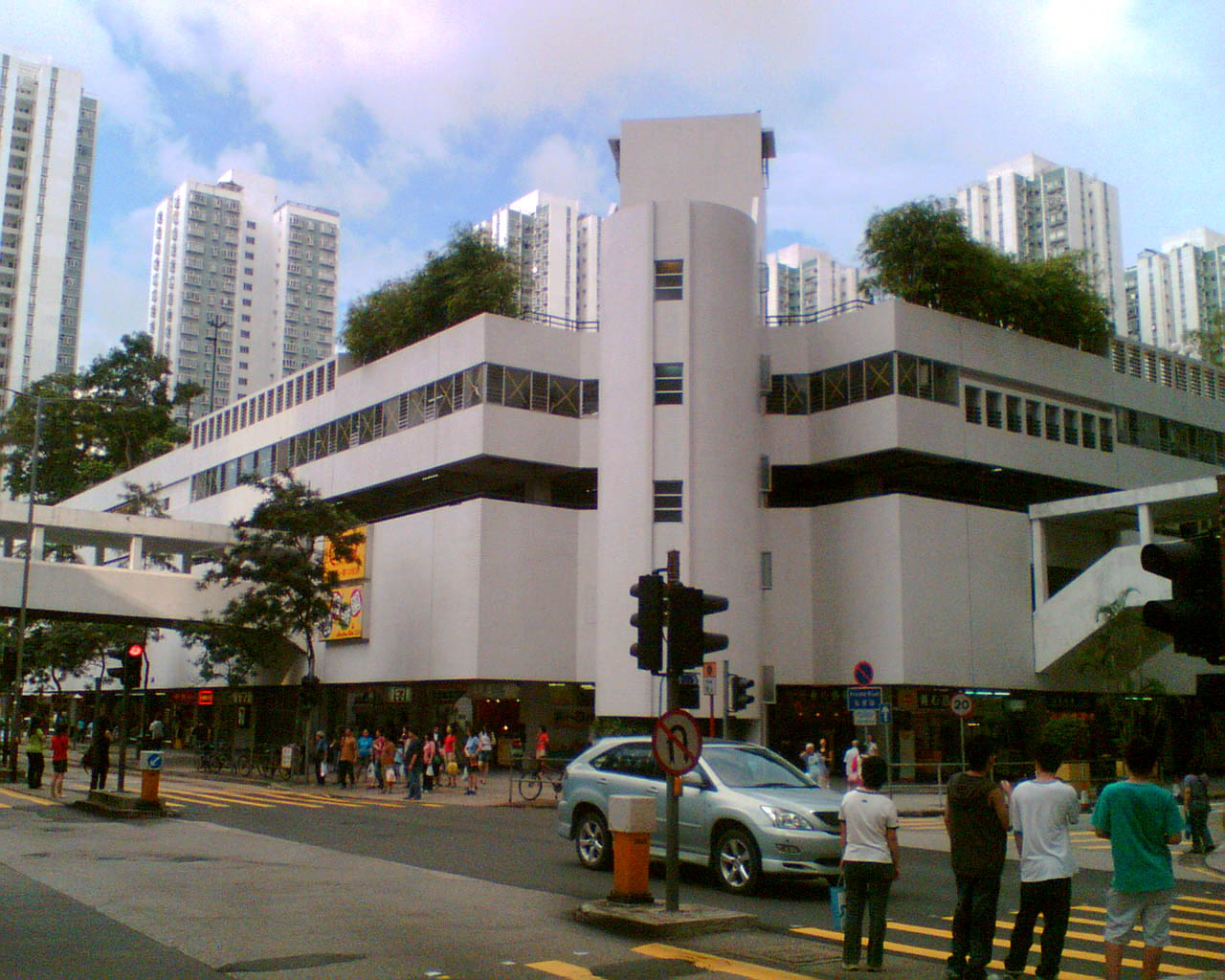
Fortune City One.

Sports and Recreation

City One includes a standard swimming pool, several basketball courts, tennis courts, squash courts, table tennis courts, and playgrounds situated on the podium of the newer phases. A jogging trail is available alongside the nearby Shing Mun River. A rooftop park was located on the top level of Fortune City One. The arcade surrounds a public open area where local events are often held. A private library managed by the City One management committee provides lending services exclusive to residents of the estate. There is also a community centre administrated by the Hong Kong PHAB Association next to block 35.

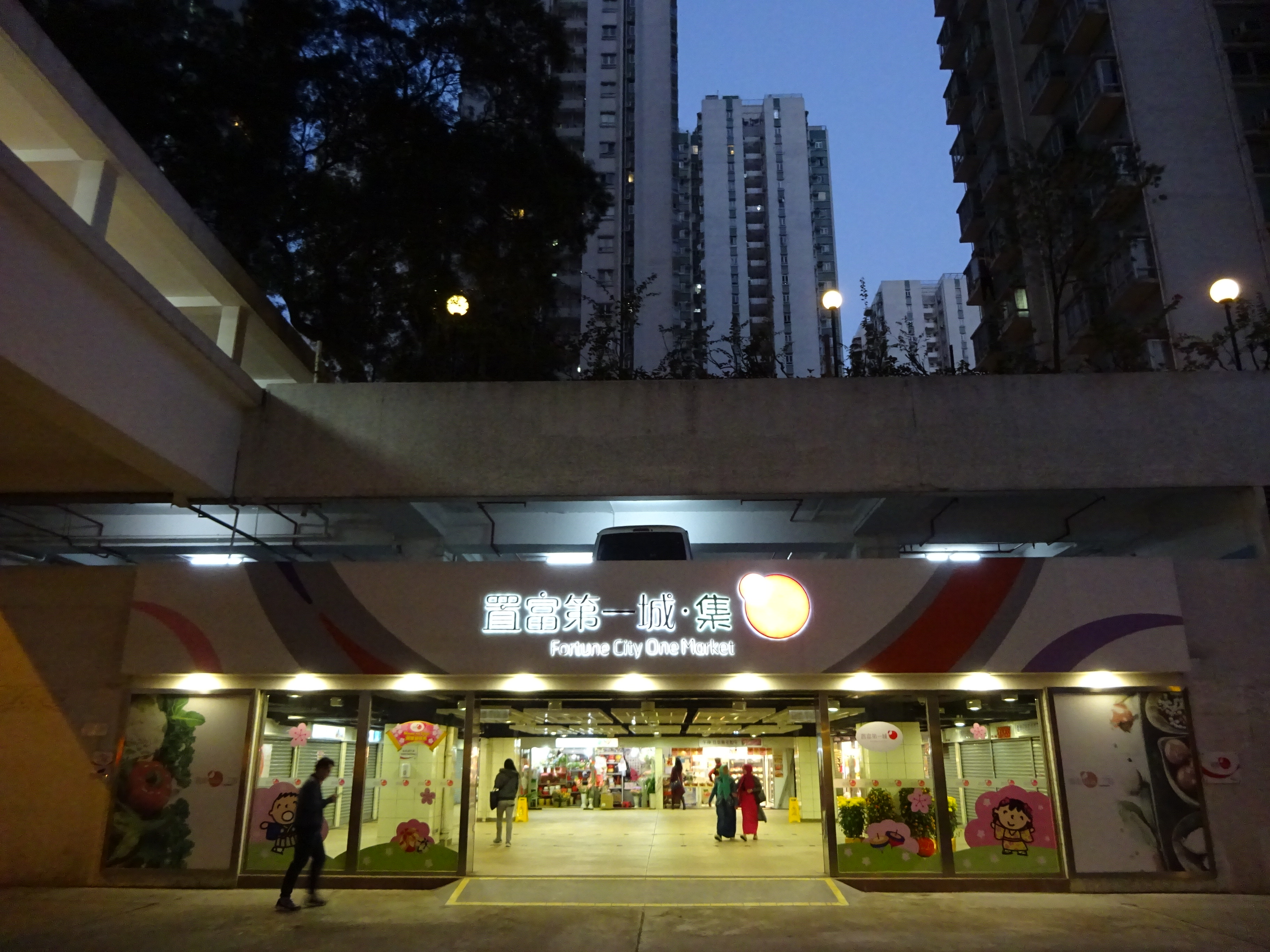
The Fortune City One Market after the renovation.

Shopping

Despite being a residential estate, City One is able to satisfy all shopping needs of residents. There are two shopping centres (Fortune City One and Fortune City One Plus, formerly known as City One Plaza and Ngan Shing Commercial Centre respectively). Local businesses including home appliance stores, variety shops, book stores, jewellers, beauty salons, optical centres, boutiques, bottle shops and confectioneries are main tenants of the two arcades. There are also larger business chains within.. The City One Shatin Post Office of the Hongkong Post provides postal and bill paying services in the heart of the estate.

The estate was originally planned with three local shopping malls. However, developers had altered the blueprint to a two shopping centre scheme. Land reserved for the third shopping centre is now built with a wet market and three more blocks of residency above it. The wet market, renovated in 2013, has all kinds of Chinese and Asian grocers, butchers, florists, greengrocers and general stores.

Dining

Local restaurants like Kam Wo Court offer casual Hong Kong-style meals. Major fast-food chains such as McDonald's, Café de Coral, Fairwood, Yoshinoya and KFC have outlets all around with extended opening hours. Cantonese restaurants, such as Fook Choi Restaurant and Glorious Chinese Restaurant, are venues for Chinese cuisine for weekend family dinners and festal banqueters. Starbucks and La Kaffa are where residents and students chill and grab an afternoon cuppa. Nevertheless, bakeries like Norika, Maxim's and A1 offer residents and commuters with freshly baked breakfast every morning.

== Health and education ==
The Prince of Wales Hospital and Yuen Chau Kok Clinic are adjacent to the estate. A number of private doctor offices and general practitioners could be found available in the two shopping centres for less urgent patients.

There are two pre-schools, two primary schools and two secondary schools nearby:

Pre-school

- Catiline Anglo-Chinese Kindergarten
- City One Anglo-Chinese Kindergarten

Primary School

- Baptist Lui Ming Choi Primary School
- Dr. Catherine F. Woo Memorial School

Secondary School

- St.Rose of Lima's College
- Pentecostal Lam Hon Kwong School
- Sheng Kung Hui Lam Kau Mow Secondary School

== Politics ==
City One is divided into two constituencies in the Sha Tin District Council, City One (R04) which has been represented by Wong Ka Wing and Yue Shing (R05) which has been represented by Leung Ka Fai. For the legislative council, City One is part of the New Territories East electorate.

2011 District Council Election, City One
| Candidate | Party | Affiliation | Vote (%) |
| WONG Ka-wing | New People's Party | Pro-Beijing | 65.92% |
| TONG Ka Wah Ronny | Civic Party | Pan-democracy | 34.08% |

2011 District Council Election, Yue Shing
| Candidate | Party | Affiliation | Vote (%) |
| LEUNG Ka-fai | Civil Force | Pro-Beijing | 67.33% |
| CHIN Wai-kin (Justin) | Civic Party | Pan-democracy | 20.38% |
| LAU Tai-sang | Democratic Party | Pan-democracy | 12.29% |

Also see District councils of Hong Kong and Legislative Council of Hong Kong

== Education ==
City One Shatin is in Primary One Admission (POA) School Net 91. Within the school net are multiple aided schools (operated independently but funded with government money); no government schools are in this net.

== Churches ==
City One Baptist Church (COBC) is the largest Christian fellowship in City One. It is a branch church of the Baptist Convention of Hong Kong. COBC was established in 1984, serving people in all age groups. Worships are conducted in both Cantonese and English language. Most of the gatherings take place at Baptist Lui Ming Choi Primary School and Citymark Plaza in Siu Lek Yuen. Other fellowships in City One include a congregation of the Chinese Rhenish Church (Hong Kong Synod) and International Fellowship North, an English speaking church in the Citimark Building. Kowloon Pentecostal Church Shatin Chapel in Pentecostal Lam Hon Kwong School holds Sunday services as well.

== Transportation ==
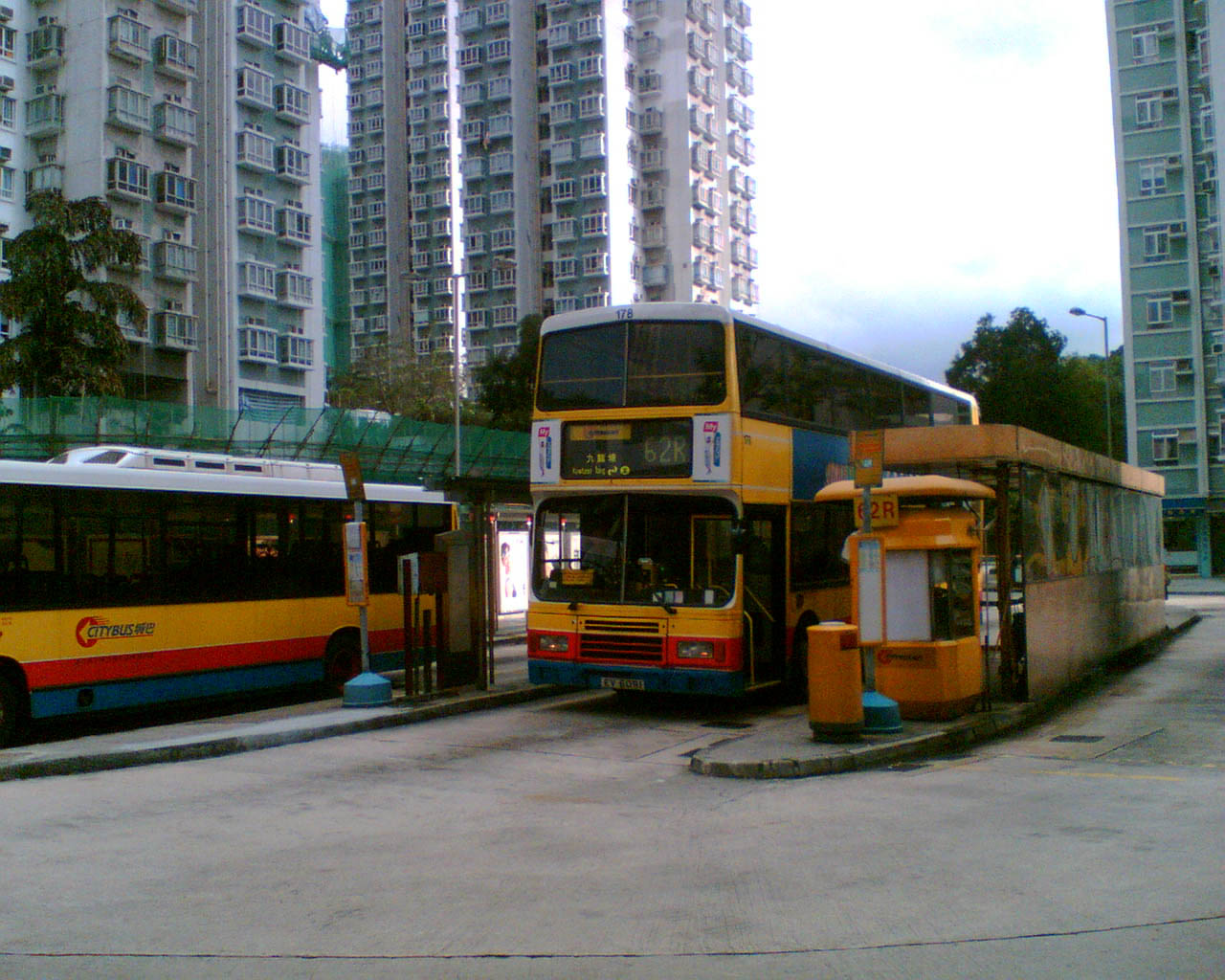
City One bus terminus.

Buses

The City One bus terminal is the terminus of route 61R and 88R operated by Citybus. Citybus operates several routes from City One to the central business district in Kowloon and on the Hong Kong Island. Many Kowloon Motor Bus bus routes serve City One as a hub, services to Kowloon, Hong Kong Island and other suburbs in the north New Territories are run with high frequency. Long Win Bus (Airbus) route A41 express service connects City One to the Hong Kong International Airport. Green Public light buses connects City One to the rest of Sha Tin with routes to Fo Tan, Ma On Shan and Tai Wai. Red Public light buses operate to/from Mong Kok after hours.

Trains

City One station, in the southern part of the estate, is a railway station on the Tuen Ma line. Trains run between Wu Kai Sha station and Tuen Mun station.

Taxis

As along with all other areas in Hong Kong, City One is easily accessible by taxis. Red urban taxis are chartered to serve the District of Sha Tin.

Driving

The estate is served by the Sha Tin Road freeway and the Tate's Cairn Highway is in close proximity. Road links between Sha Tin and Kowloon are provided by the Lion Rock Tunnel, Tsing Sha Highway and Tai Po Road. Traffic to the northwestern New Territories has been improved by the Shing Mun Tunnel which links Sha Tin with Tsuen Wan.

Access to the northern New Territories has been greatly improved since the opening of the Tolo Highway in September 1985. This, together with Sha Tin Road and Tai Po Road, forms a highway system which connects the New Town with Tai Po and beyond. Connection to Sai Kung has been provided by Sai Sha Road since October 1988.

Urban Kowloon can be reached within 20 minutes and Central on the Hong Kong Island in 35 minutes with normal traffic conditions.

== Notable residents ==
- Leticia Wong (born 1992), representative for City One on Sha Tin District (2019–2021).

== See also ==
- Private housing estates in Sha Tin District
- Sha Tin New Town
- New towns of Hong Kong
