= Allied Plaza =

Shopping mall in Mong Kok, Hong Kong

Coordinates: 22.323475°N 114.168815°E

- Chinese: 聯合廣場
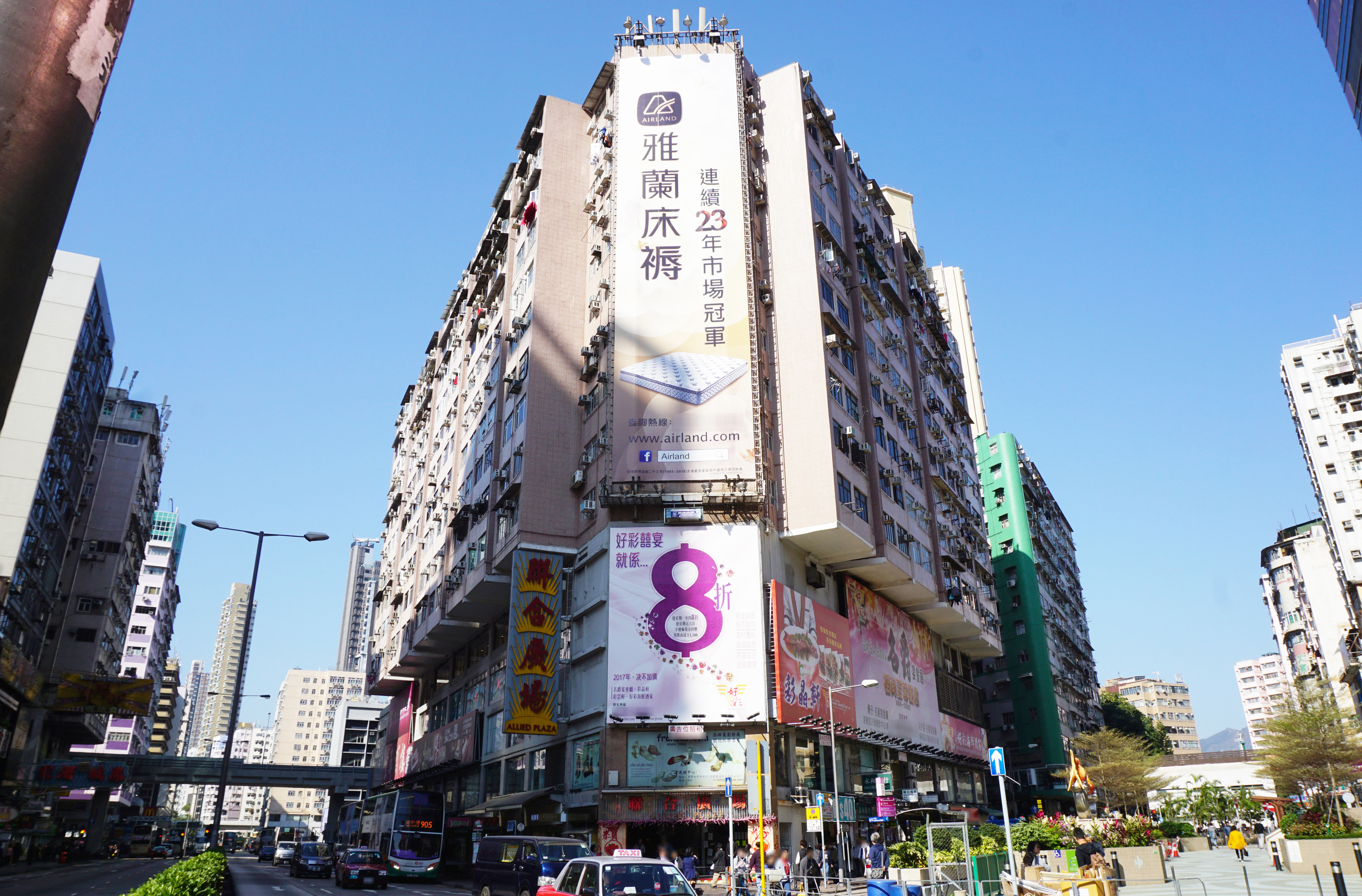
- Allied Plaza (full view)
- Interactive map of the Allied Plaza area

General information
- Type: Shopping centre
- Location: Intersection of Nathan Road and Nullah Road in Mong Kok, Yau Tsim Mong District, 760 Nathan Road, Hong Kong

Allied Plaza
- Traditional Chinese: 聯合廣場
Transcriptions
Yue: Cantonese
- Yale Romanization: Lyùhn gap gwóng chèuhng
- Jyutping: Lyun4 gap3 gwong2 coeng4

Allied Plaza (Chinese: 聯合廣場) is a shopping mall located in G/F to 3/F of Cosmopolitan Centre (Chinese: 東海大廈), at the intersection of Nathan Road and Nullah Road in Mong Kok, Yau Tsim Mong District, Hong Kong next to Prince Edward station.
