= Jat Chuen (constituency) =

Hong Kong constituency

- Elected constituency for the Sha Tin District Council
- Boundary of Jat Chuen in Sha Tin District
- District: Sha Tin
- Legislative Council constituency: New Territories North East
- Population: 19,634 (2019)
- Electorate: 11,144 (2019)

Current constituency
- Created: 1994
- Number of members: One
- Member: Vacant

Jat Chuen (Chinese: 乙泉), previously Jat Min, is one of the 41 constituencies in the Sha Tin District in Hong Kong.

The constituency returns one district councillor to the Sha Tin District Council, with an election every four years.

The Jat Chuen constituency is loosely based on Jat Min Chuen, Shui Chuen O Estate, Tsok Pok Hang San Tsuen and Shan Ha Wai, with an estimated population of 19,634.

== Councillors represented ==
Election	Member	Party
1994	Lam Hong-wah	Civil Force
2011	Yau Man-chun→Vacant	Neo Democrats
2016	Yau Man-chun→Vacant	Independent

== Election results ==
=== 2010s ===
Sha Tin District Council Election, 2019: Jat Chuen
Party	Candidate	Votes	%	±%
Ind. democrat	Yau Man-chun	5,280	66.39	−0.51
NPP (Civil Force)	Leung Ho-kai	2,673	33.61	
Majority		2,607	32.78	
Turnout		7,988	71.71	
Ind. democrat hold		Swing		

Sha Tin District Council Election, 2015: Jat Min
Party	Candidate	Votes	%	±%
Neo Democrats	Yau Man-chun	3,221	66.9	+14.1
NPP (Civil Force)	Michael Yip Ka-ming	1,050	21.8	−25.4
BPA	Chau Ping-him	541	11.2	
Majority		2,171	45.1	−5.2
Turnout		4,812	58.8	+8.5
Neo Democrats hold		Swing	+19.8	

Sha Tin District Council Election, 2011: Jat Min
Party	Candidate	Votes	%	±%
Neo Democrats	Yau Man-chun	2,296	52.8	
Civil Force	Lam Hong-wah	2,049	47.2	
Majority		247	5.6	−36.4
Turnout		4,345	50.3	
Neo Democrats gain from Civil Force		Swing		

=== 2000s ===
Sha Tin District Council Election, 2007: Jat Min
Party	Candidate	Votes	%	±%
Civil Force	Lam Hong-wah	2,171	71.0	
Frontier	Cheung Lai-wah	888	29.0	
Majority		1,283	42.0	
Civil Force hold		Swing		

Sha Tin District Council Election, 2003: Jat Min
Party	Candidate	Votes	%	±%
Civil Force	Lam Hong-wah	uncontested		
Civil Force hold		Swing		

=== 1990s ===
Sha Tin District Council Election, 1999: Jat Min
Party	Candidate	Votes	%	±%
Civil Force	Lam Hong-wah	uncontested		
Civil Force hold		Swing		

Sha Tin District Board Election, 1994: Jat Min
Party	Candidate	Votes	%	±%
Civil Force	Lam Hong-wah	1,519	55.1	
Independent	Miu Kam-to	1,236	44.9	
Majority		283	10.8	
Civil Force win (new seat)				
