= Concord Square (Hong Kong) =

Building in Tsuen Wan, Hong Kong

Coordinates: 22.36979°N 114.11540°E

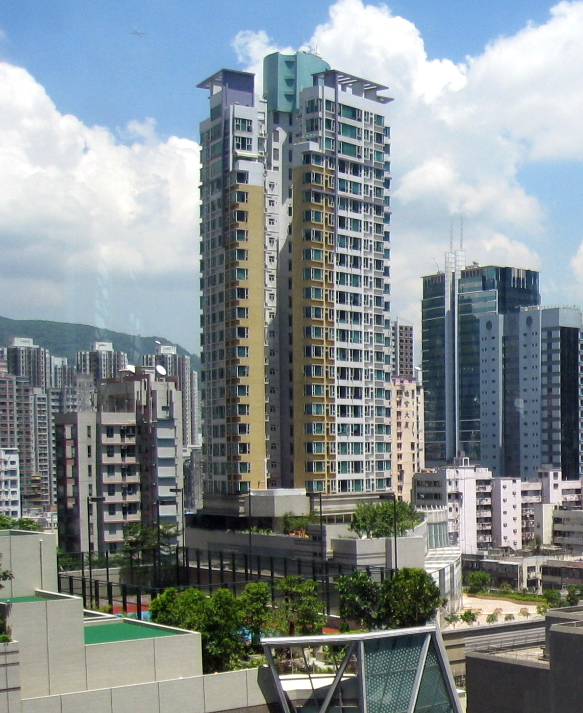
Concord Square

Concord Square (Chinese: 協和廣場) is a shopping centre in Tsuen Wan, New Territories, Hong Kong. Formerly the old buildings and villages in Tai Uk Wai (Chinese: 大屋圍), The Blue Yard (built in 2002) and the shopping centre were portions of Tsuen Wan Seven Street Redevelopment Project (Chinese: 荃灣七街重建計劃). It was completed in 2003 and developed by Concord Land Development Company Limited. A Wellcome supermarket is at its basement.
