= Skyline Plaza (Hong Kong) =

Building in Tsuen Wan, Hong Kong

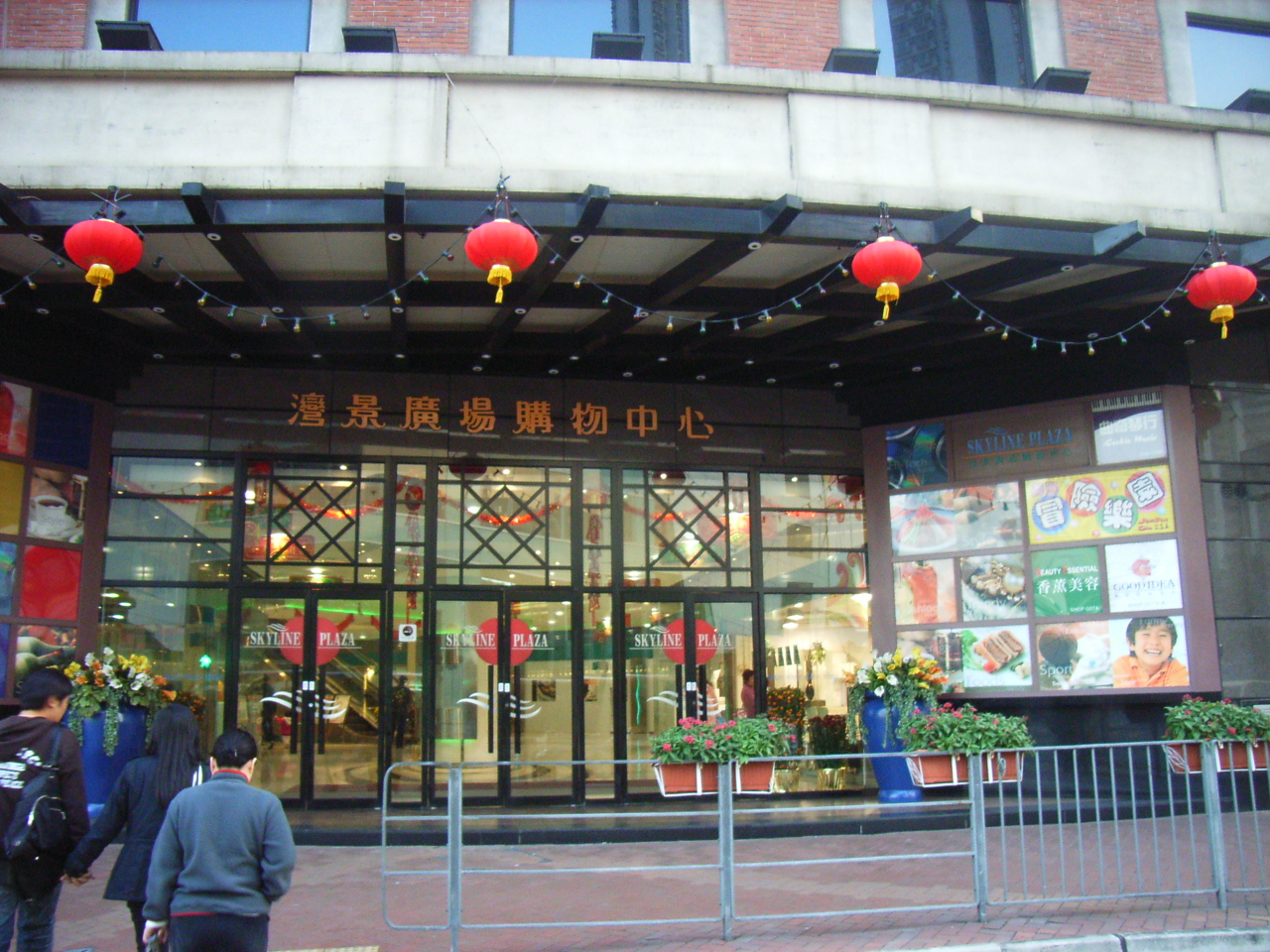
- Entrance near Tai Ho Road
- Location: Tsuen Wan, Hong Kong
- Coordinates: 22°22′11″N 114°06′42″E
- Address: 88 Tai Ho Road
- Opened: April 1995; 31 years ago
- Owner: Henderson Land Development
- Floors: 4
- Website: www.hld.com/property/locallease/arcade/nt/skyline2000/index.htm

Skyline Plaza (Chinese: 灣景廣場) is a private housing estate and shopping mall in Tsuen Wan, Hong Kong. It is close to the Tsuen Wan Town Hall, Tsuen Wan Ferry Pier, Nina Tower and MTR Tsuen Wan West station. It was developed by the Henderson Land Development in April 1995.

== Shopping mall ==
Former tenants of the Skyline Plaza shopping mall include two large supermarkets, a Park'n Megastore and a Carrefour (closed in 2000). In January 2012, Skyline Plaza closed and was renovating to later relocate a Æon Department Store from the nearby Tsuen Wan Plaza to this location. The department store was opened on 20 October 2012.

== Residential ==
The residential part of Skyline Plaza is located on the 4–39 floor with a platform garden and swimming pool on the fourth floor. Each floor has 8 units lettered A–H.

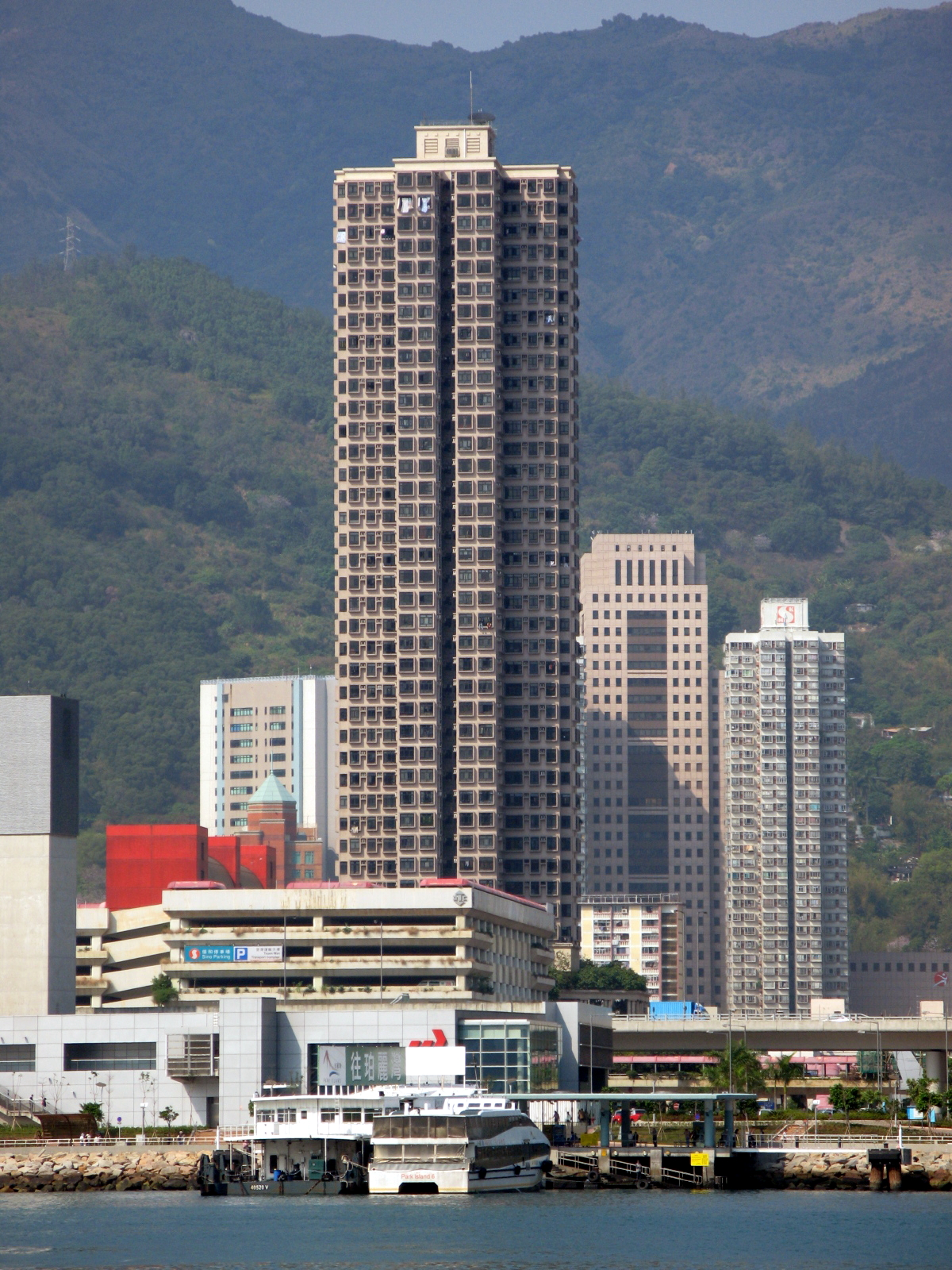
Skyline Plaza

== See also ==
- Citywalk, Hong Kong
