= Shui Chuen O Estate =

Public housing estate in Shatin, Hong Kong

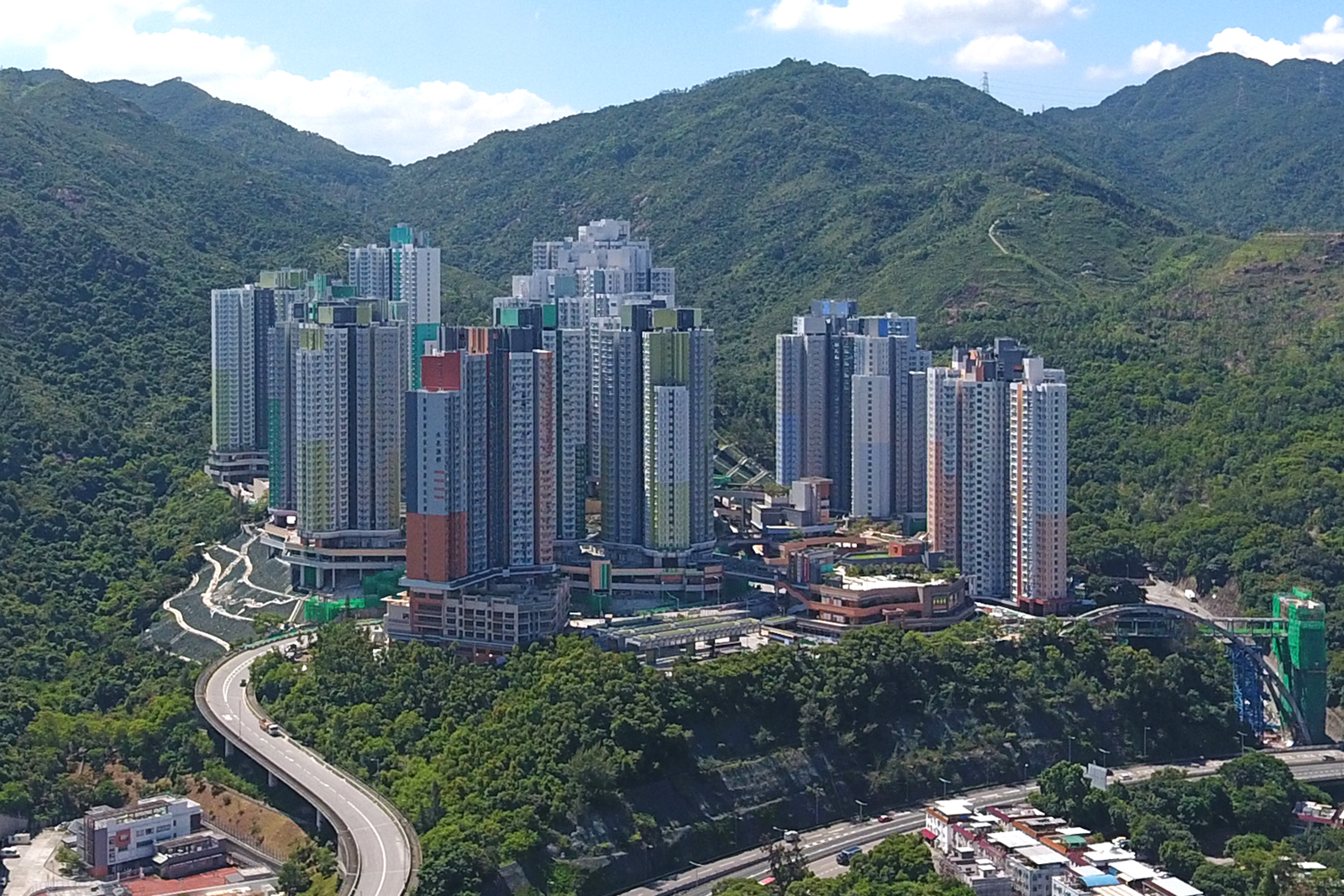
- View of Shui Chuen O Estate
- Interactive map of Shui Chuen O Estate

General information
- Location: 1 Pok Chuen Street, Sha Tin, New Territories; Hong Kong
- Coordinates: 22°22′21.9″N 114°11′52″E
- Status: Completed
- Category: Public rental housing
- Population: 14,083 (2016)
- No. of blocks: 18
- No. of units: 11,123

Construction
- Constructed: 2014; 12 years ago
- Authority: Hong Kong Housing Authority

Shui Chuen O Estate
- Chinese: 水泉澳邨
- Cantonese Yale: séui chyùhn ou chyūn
Transcriptions
Yue: Cantonese
- Yale Romanization: séui chyùhn ou chyūn
- Jyutping: seoi2 cyun4 ou3 cyun1

Shui Chuen O Estate (Chinese: 水泉澳邨) is the largest public housing estate in Sha Tin, New Territories, Hong Kong.

The estate comprises 18 blocks offering 11,123 public rental flats. It also includes a commercial complex with 59 shops and an indoor market. The estate sits on a hillside and is linked to the lower-lying areas by a footbridge and lift towers, providing easy access to Pok Hong Estate and Sha Tin Wai station.

== History ==
The estate was built in four phases concurrently. The first phase opened for population intake in 2015.

The estate was affected by the 2015 lead in drinking water scandal.

Additionally, there have been construction quality concerns. In 2016, a tenant at Shing Chuen House discovered that the floor slab under his flat's toilet was filled with powdery gravel. The material could be dug up by hand, exposing the rebar within the floor slab. The estate was built by China State Construction, which has also been embroiled in controversy over contaminated water at Kai Ching Estate.

== Houses ==
English name	Chinese name	Type	Phase	Completion
Ching Chuen House	清泉樓	Non-standard (Y-shaped)	1	2014
Long Chuen House	朗泉樓	Non-standard (Y-shaped)	1	2014
Yan Chuen House	欣泉樓	Non-standard (Y-shaped)	1	2014
Hei Chuen House	喜泉樓	Non-standard (Y-shaped)	1	2014
Shing Chuen House	城泉樓	Non-standard (Y-shaped)	2	2015
Ho Chuen House	河泉樓	Non-standard (Y-shaped)	2	2015
Ming Chuen House	明泉樓	Non-standard (Y-shaped)	2	2015
Mau Chuen House	茂泉樓	Non-standard (Y-shaped)	3	2015
Lam Chuen House	林泉樓	Non-standard (Y-shaped)	3	2015
Shou Chuen House	修泉樓	Non-standard (Y-shaped)	3	2015
Chuk Chuen House	竹泉樓	Non-standard (Y-shaped)	3	2015
Sung Chuen House	崇泉樓	Non-standard (Y-shaped)	4	2015
Ling Chuen House	嶺泉樓	Non-standard (Y-shaped)	4	2015
Lok Chuen House	樂泉樓	Non-standard (cross-shaped)	1	2014
Yuet Chuen House	月泉樓	Non-standard (cross-shaped)	2	2015
Ying Chuen House	映泉樓	Non-standard (cross-shaped)	2	2015
Shan Chuen House	山泉樓	Non-standard (cross-shaped)	4	2015
Tsun Chuen House	峻泉樓	Non-standard (cross-shaped)	4	2015

== Features ==
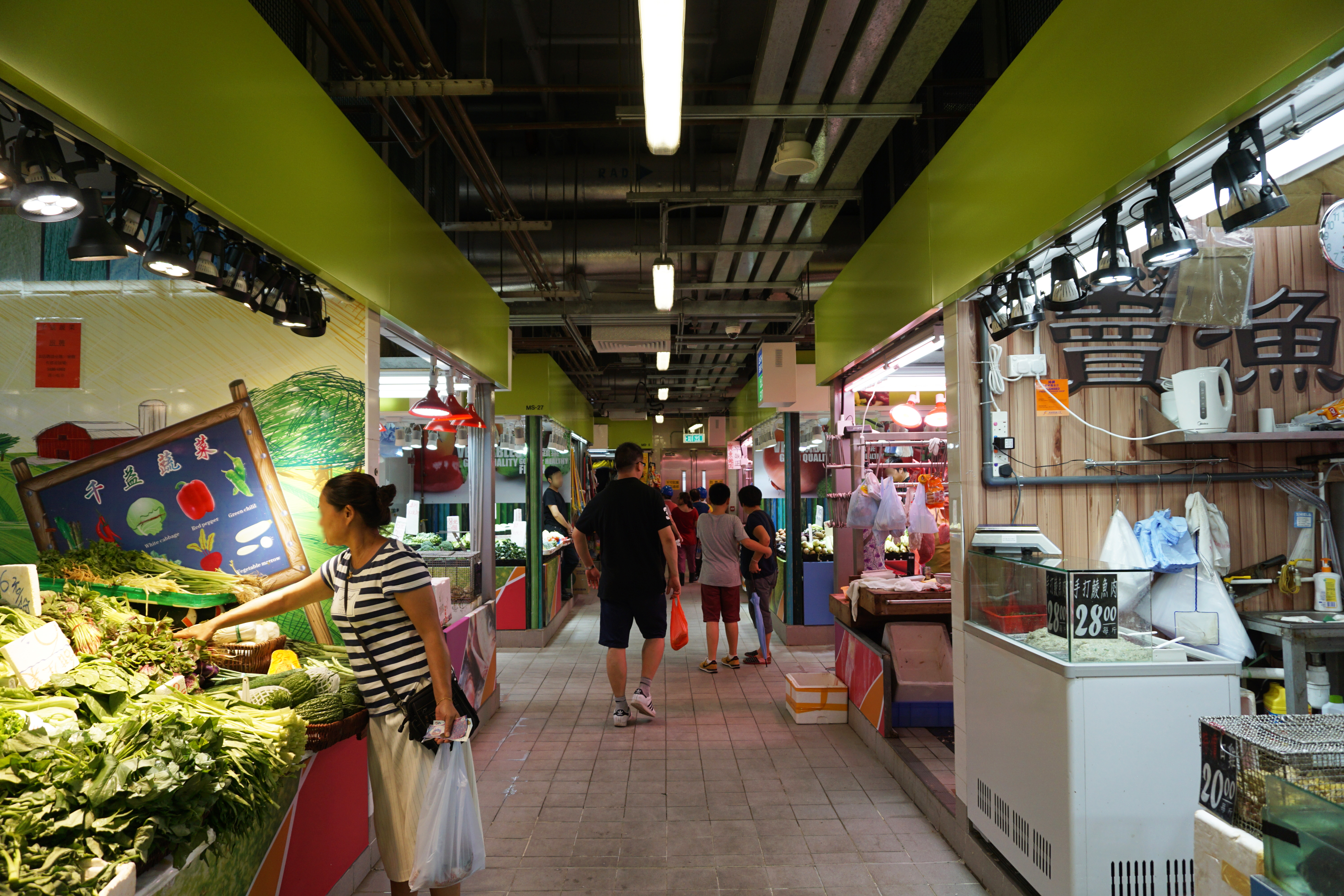
Shui Chuen O Market

The Shui Chuen O Shopping Centre has 59 shops.

The Shui Chuen O Market is connected to the shopping centre.

In order to facilitate pedestrian movement around the steeply sloping site, the estate design includes six lift towers, nine footbridges, and ten sets of escalators. The longest footbridge is located at the main entrance of the estate at Shui Chuen Au Street. With a length of 70 metres, it is the longest footbridge in any Hong Kong public housing estate.

== Demographics ==
As of 20 September 2016 (before all residents had moved in), the estate had a population of 14,083.

As of 31 March 2025, the authorised population is 27,900, rounded to the nearest hundred.

== Politics ==
Shui Chuen O Estate falls within the purview of the Sha Tin District Council. In the 2015 election it fell entirely within the Jat Min constituency, which was represented by Yau Man-chun.

For the 2019 District Council election, the estate fell within two constituencies. Most of the estate is now located in the newly created Shui Chuen O constituency, which is represented by Lo Tak-ming. The remainder falls within the Jat Chuen constituency, which is represented by Yau Man-chun.

For the Legislative Council elections, Shui Chuen O falls within the New Territories East constituency.

== Transport ==
There is a bus terminus at the estate. It is served by two all-day Kowloon Motor Bus routes, several peak hour-only routes, and green minibuses.

It is also within walking distance of Sha Tin Wai station.
