= Tai Wai =

Area in the New Territories, Hong Kong

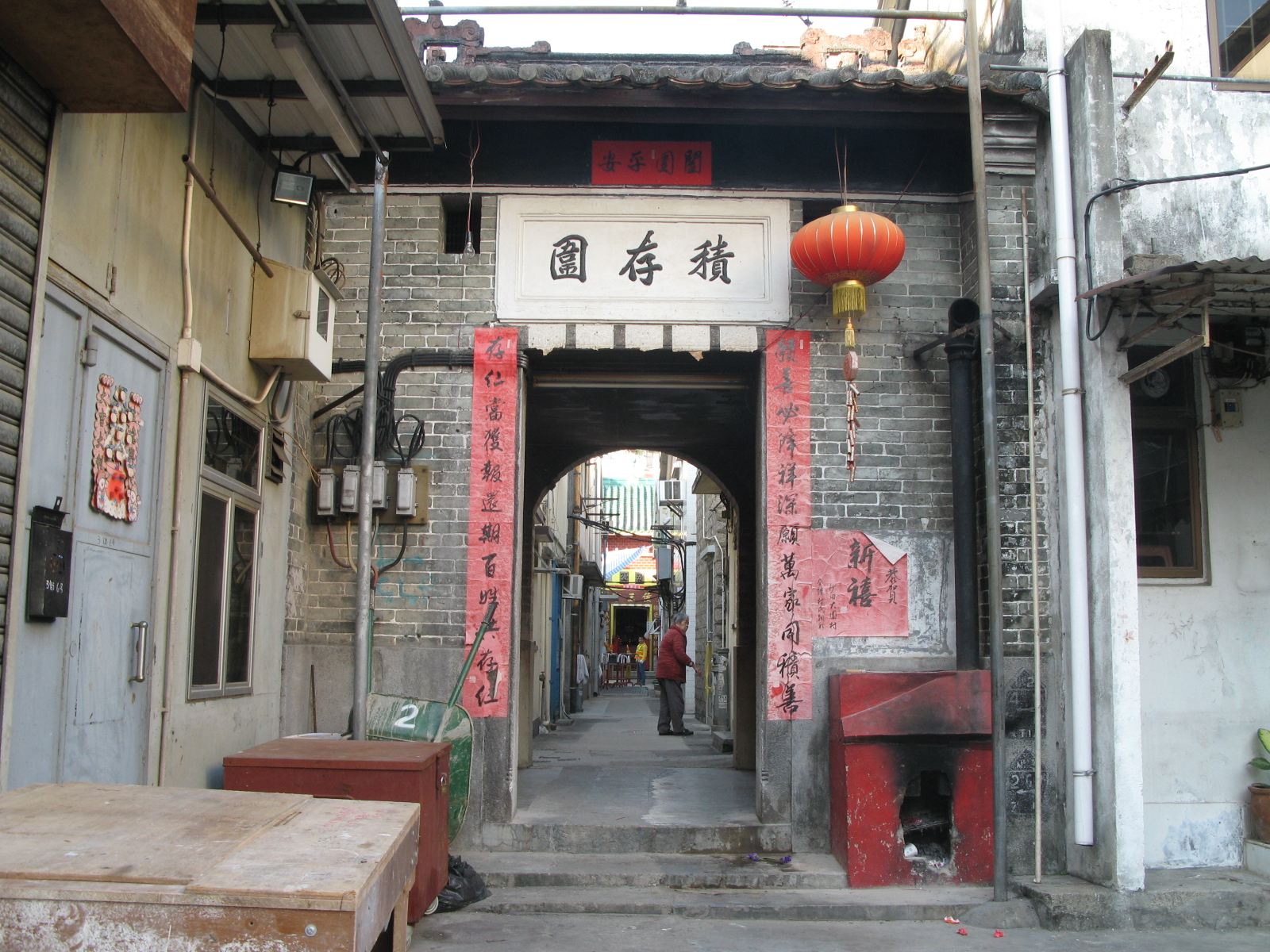
- Tai Wai area is the home of several historic villages. This is the entrance gate of Chik Chuen Wai aka. Tai Wai.
- Traditional Chinese: 大圍
- Simplified Chinese: 大围
- Literal meaning: Big Encirclement
Transcriptions
Standard Mandarin
- Hanyu Pinyin: Dàwéi
Yue: Cantonese
- Yale Romanization: Daai wàih
- Jyutping: Daai3 wai4
- IPA: tāːi wɐ̏i

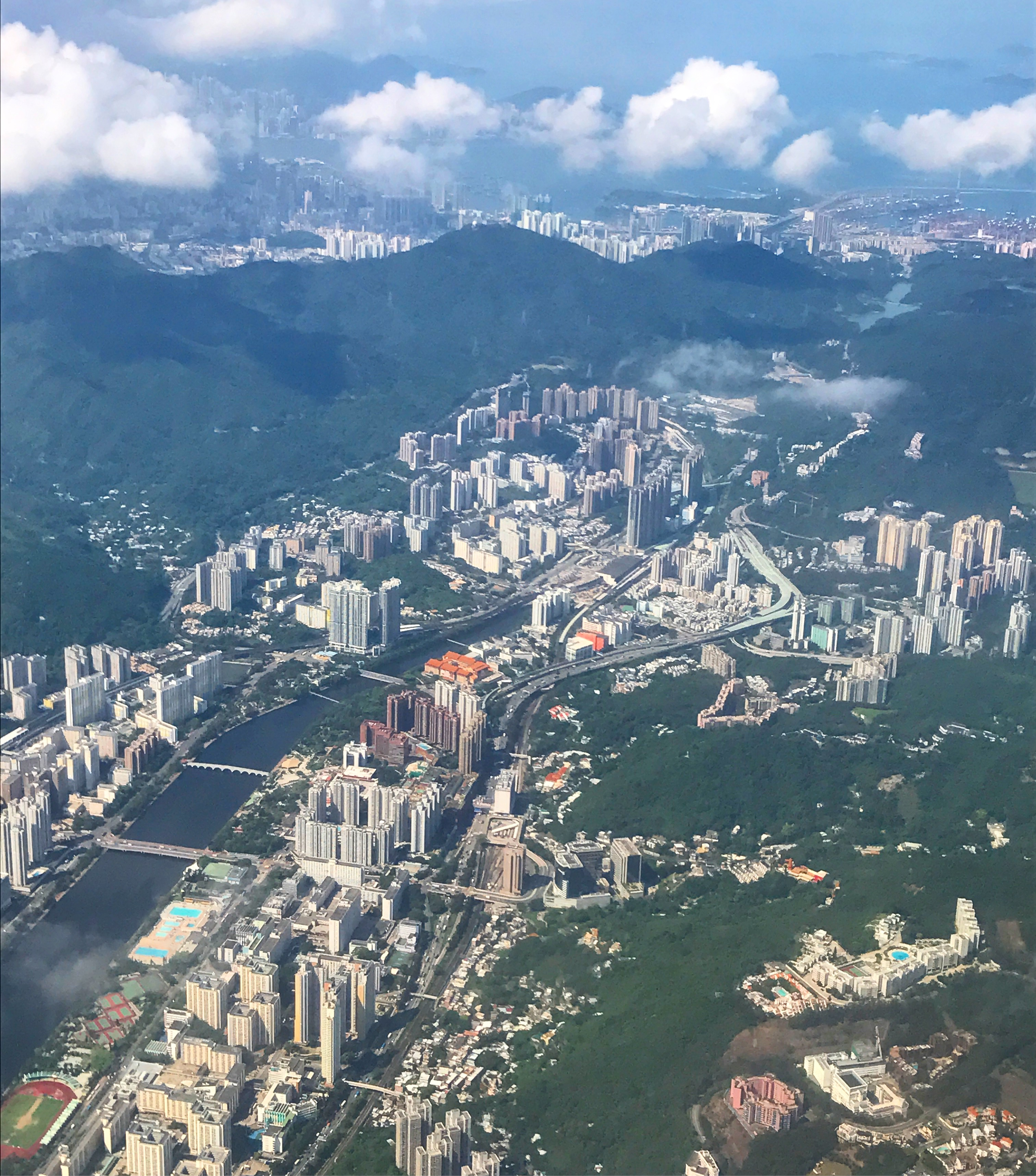
Aerial view of Sha Tin (foreground), Tai Wai (centre) and the Shing Mun River, looking southwest. The mountains at the back mark the limit between the New Territories and New Kowloon, which is located beyond.

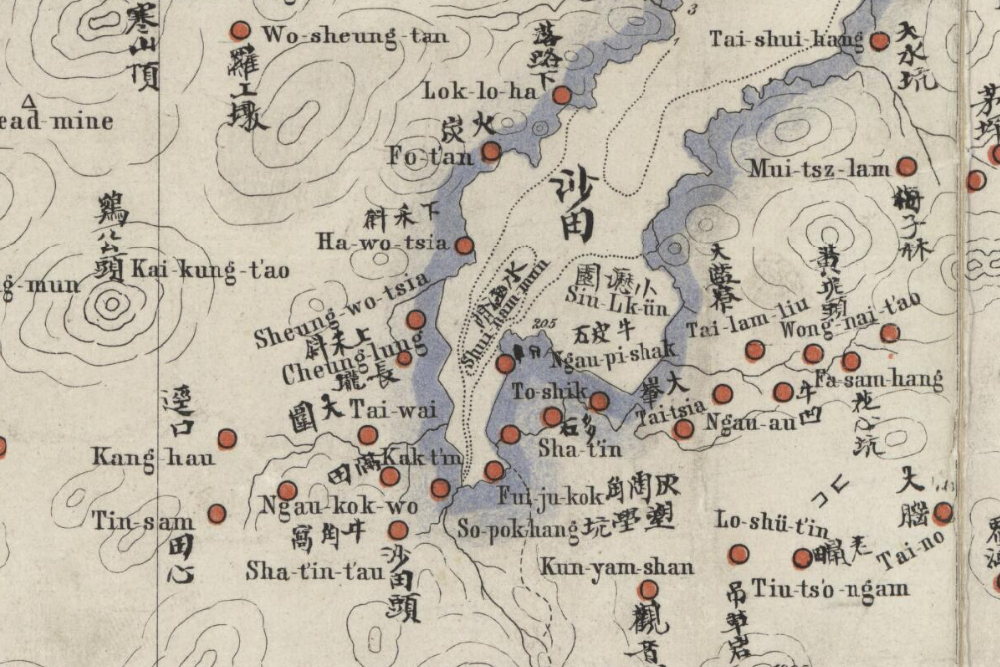
Tai Wai on the "Map of the San-On District" by Simeone Volonteri (1866)

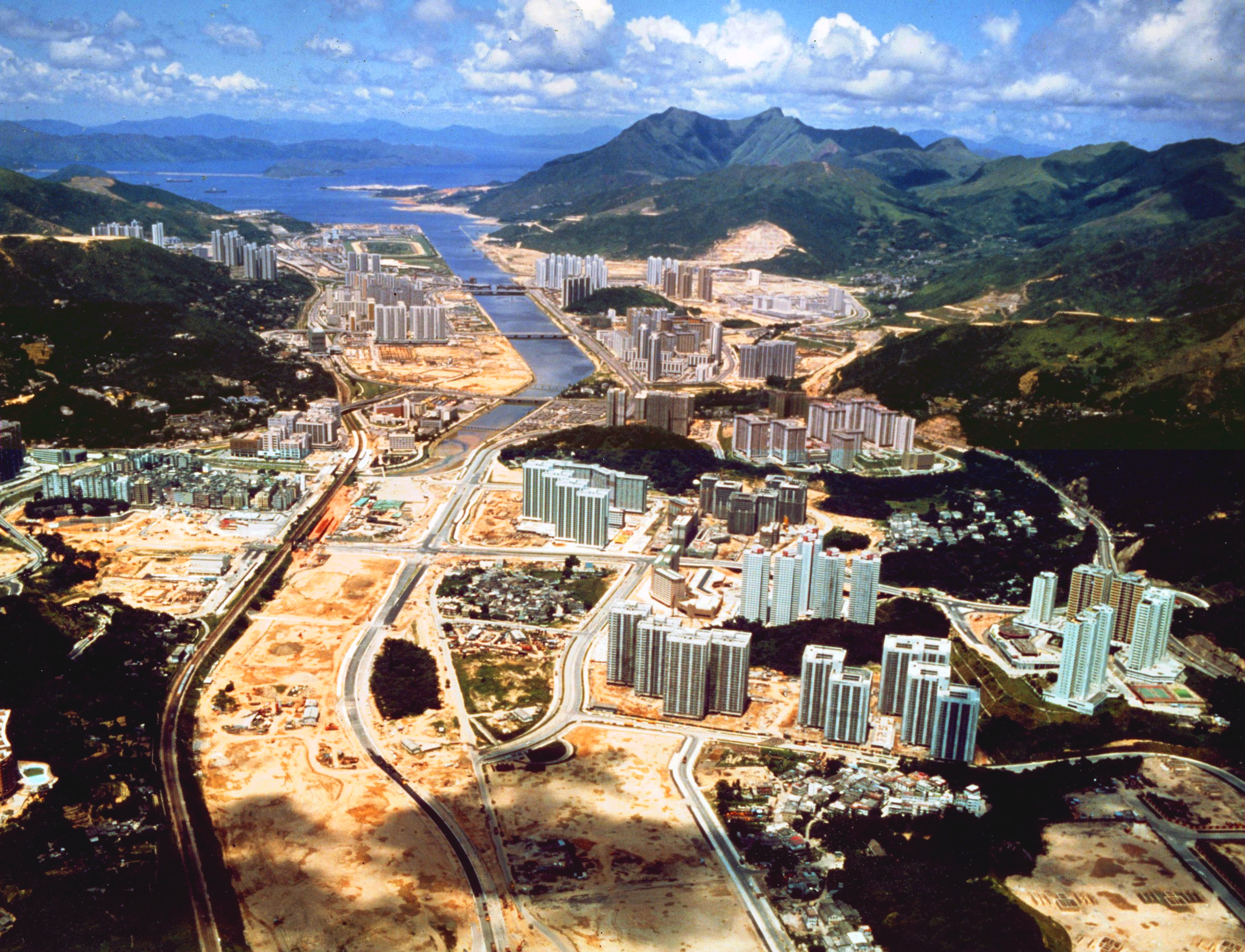
View of Sha Tin New Town under development in 1983, looking northeast toward the Shing Mun River and Tolo Harbour. Tai Wai is in the foreground.

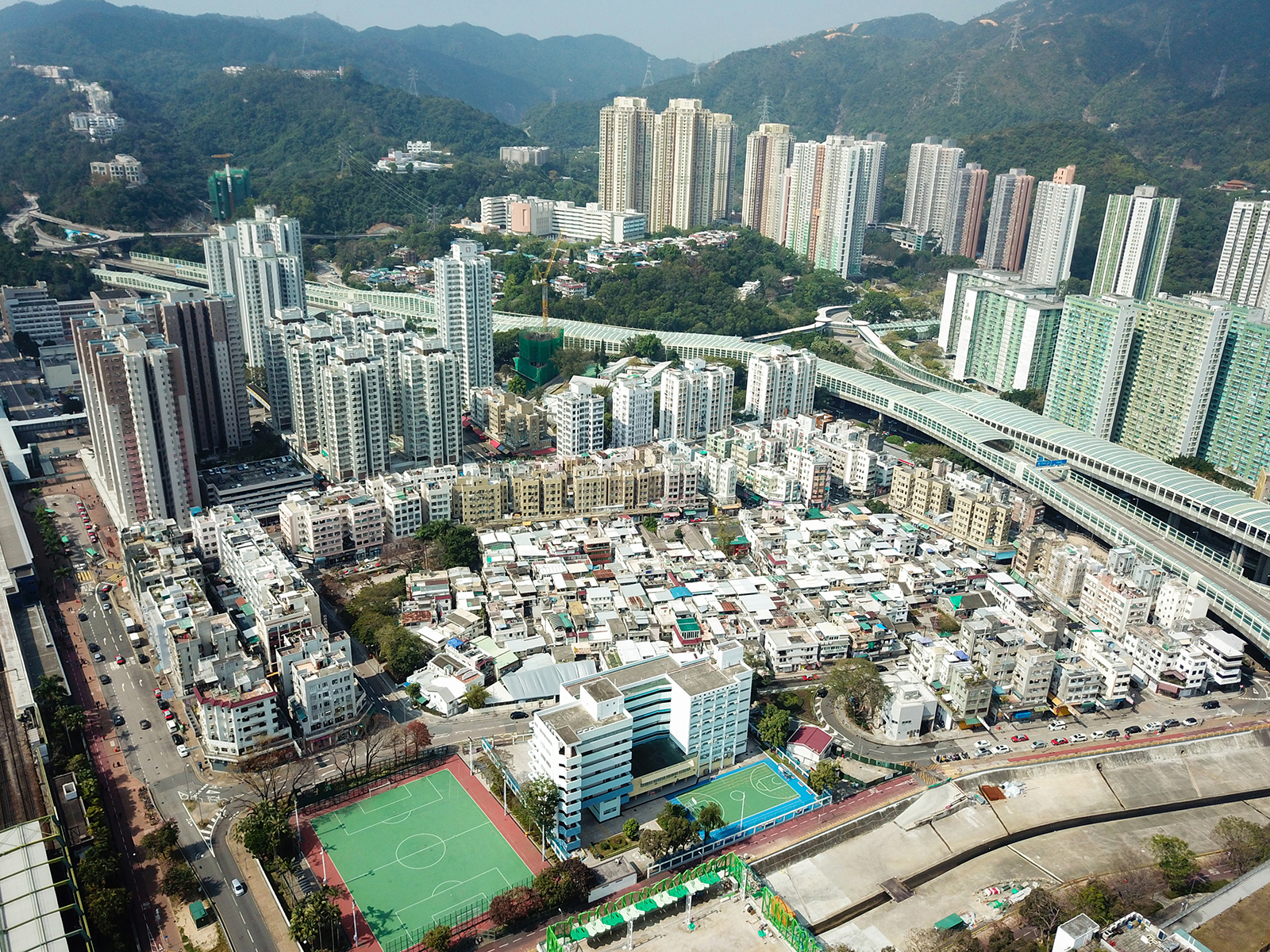
Aerial view of Tai Wai Village and surrounding area in 2018.

Tai Wai (Chinese: 大圍; Jyutping: daai6 wai4, /ˌtaɪ ˈwaɪ/) is an area in the New Territories, Hong Kong, located between Sha Tin and the Lion Rock, within the Sha Tin District.

With three rapid transit stations, one of which an interchange station serving two lines, five bus termini and several trunk roads and tunnels connecting it to other parts of the New Territories, such as Tsuen Wan, and Kowloon, Tai Wai is an important transport node in Hong Kong.

== Geography ==
Tai Wai occupies the southwestern end of the Sha Tin Valley. The Sha Tin area is located directly northeast of Tai Wai. Hill ranges separate Tai Wai from New Kowloon in the south, and from Tsuen Wan in the west. The Tai Wai Nullah, sometimes referred to as the upper stream of Shing Mun River, flows through Tai Wai, where it joins the Shing Mun River. The Shing Mun River then flows in a southwest–northeast direction across the Sha Tin Valley towards Tolo Harbour.

== History ==
Sprouting from traditional farming villages growing rice, vegetables and fruits, such as choy sum, Chinese broccoli, bamboo, banana, peach, and lychee, Tai Wai area once functioned as a light suburban industrial park in the 1970s. Few factory buildings are still in use, mostly as warehouses. The current urbanization of the area is the consequence of the development of Sha Tin New Town that started in the 1970s.

Tai Wai Village, where the name of the area came from, was the largest and oldest walled village in Sha Tin. It was built in 1574 during the Ming dynasty, and was called Chik Chuen Wai (積存圍) at the time. It was originally made up of 16 families, Wai (韋), Chan (陳), Ng (吳), Yeung (楊), Wong (黃), Lee (李), Hui (許), Cheng (鄭), Tong (唐), Yuen (袁), Yau (游), Lam (林), Lok (駱), Tam (譚), Mok (莫) and Choy (蔡).

The Wai family, being the largest family, is thought to be the direct descendants of the famous founder general of the Han dynasty, Han Xin, who purportedly fled there to escape executions ordered by Emperor Gao of Han's empress Empress Lü Zhi. The Han descendants changed their surname into Wai by splitting the word Han (韓) in two halves and took up the character on the right hand side, Wai (韋).

The Cheng family, on the other hand, originated from a place called Xingyang in Zhengzhou, Henan which is the place where Chang'e supposedly flew to the Moon. It is also the birthplace of Li Shangyin, one of the most famous poets in the late Tang dynasty.

Tai Wai appears on the "Map of the San-On District", published in 1866 by Simeone Volonteri.

The first public housing estate built in the area was Mei Lam Estate, with the first two blocks of its Phase 1 completed in 1981. Tai Wai station opened in August 1983.

== Electoral constituencies ==
Tai Wai covers 11 of the 38 constituencies in Sha Tin District, as defined at the time of the 2015 Hong Kong District Council elections. They are: Chun Fung (秦豐, R10), Sun Tin Wai (新田圍, R11), Chui Tin (翠田, R12), Hin Ka (顯嘉, R13), Lower Shing Mun (下城門, R14), Wan Shing (雲城, R15), Keng Hau (徑口, R16), Tin Sum (田心, R17), Chui Ka (翠嘉, R18), Tai Wai (大圍, R19), Chung Tin (松田, R20).

== Demographics ==
Tai Wai is composed largely of low to medium income households of different ethnic backgrounds ranging from local Chinese to Westerners. According to the 2016 Population By-census, the number of persons living in Tai Wai was as follows:

Constituency	Male	Female	Total
Chun Fung (R10)	7,131	8,135	15,266
Sun Tin Wai (R11)	7,507	8,621	16,128
Chui Tin (R12)	7,166	8,078	15,244
Hin Ka (R13)	5,736	6,458	12,194
Lower Shing Mun (R14)	8,614	9,520	18,134
Wan Shing (R15)	9,799	12,470	22,269
Keng Hau (R16)	9,548	11,397	20,945
Tin Sum (R17)	7,063	7,450	14,513
Chui Ka (R18)	7,649	8,583	16,232
Tai Wai (R19)	9,139	11,127	20,266
Chung Tin (R20)	6,649	8,115	14,764
Total	86,001	99,954	185,955

== Housing ==
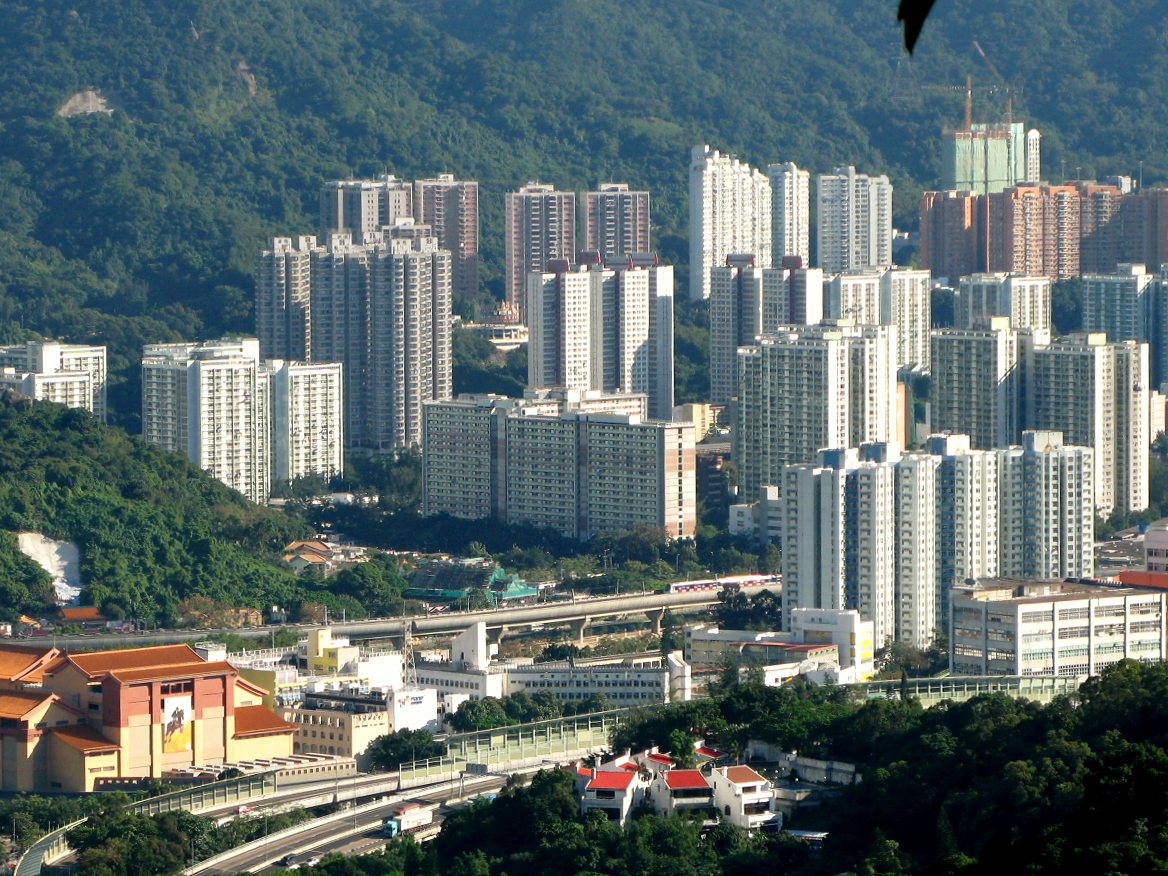
Housing estates in Tai Wai, including King Tin Court, Sun Chui Estate and Man Lai Court. The Hong Kong Heritage Museum is visible at the bottom left.

A large part of the population of Tai Wai lives in public housing estates. Privately owned apartment blocks are also common and higher income luxury housing is also available in various parts of Tai Wai. Hundreds of three-storey village houses (some western styled, others more traditional) can be found in the villages of the area.

=== Public housing ===
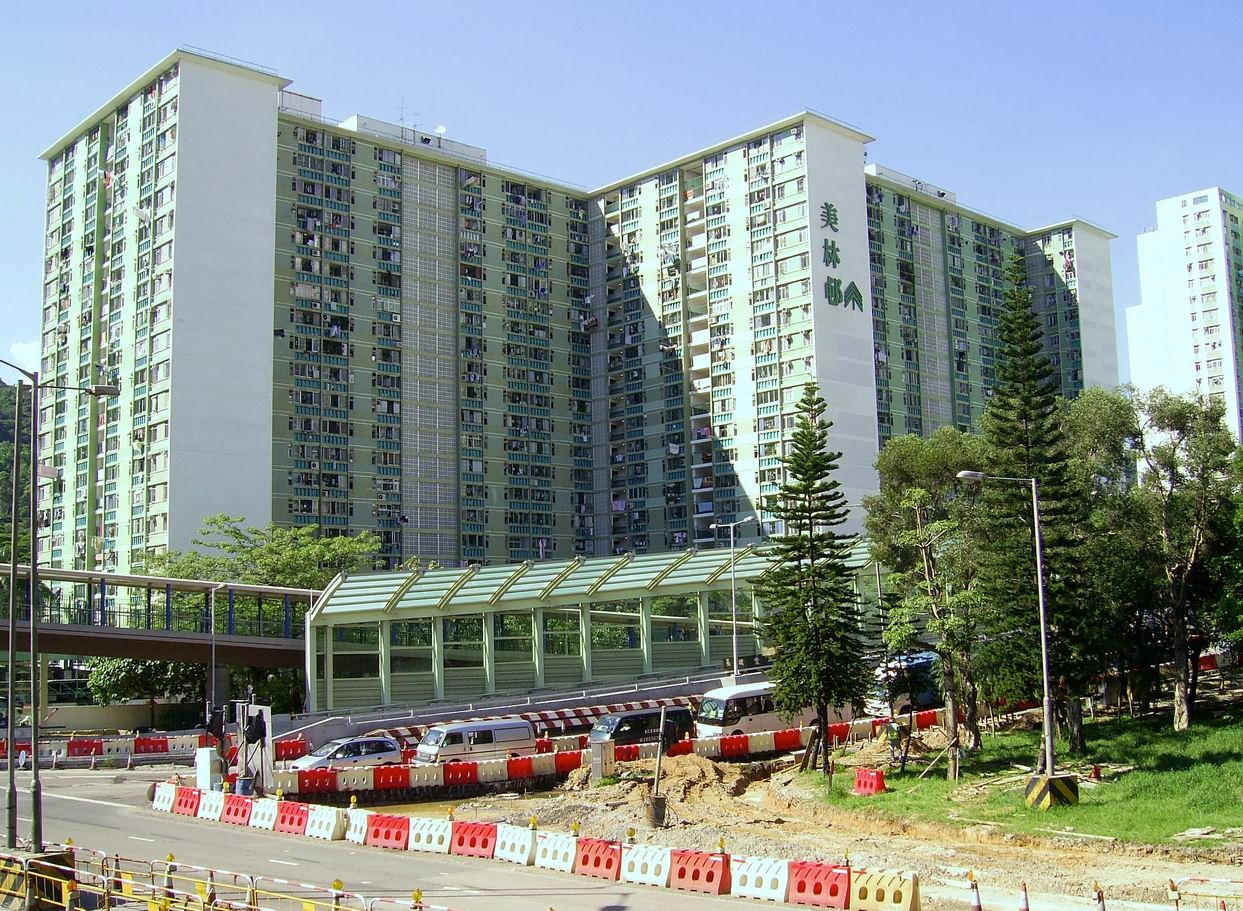
Mei Fung House of Mei Lam Estate, built in 1981.

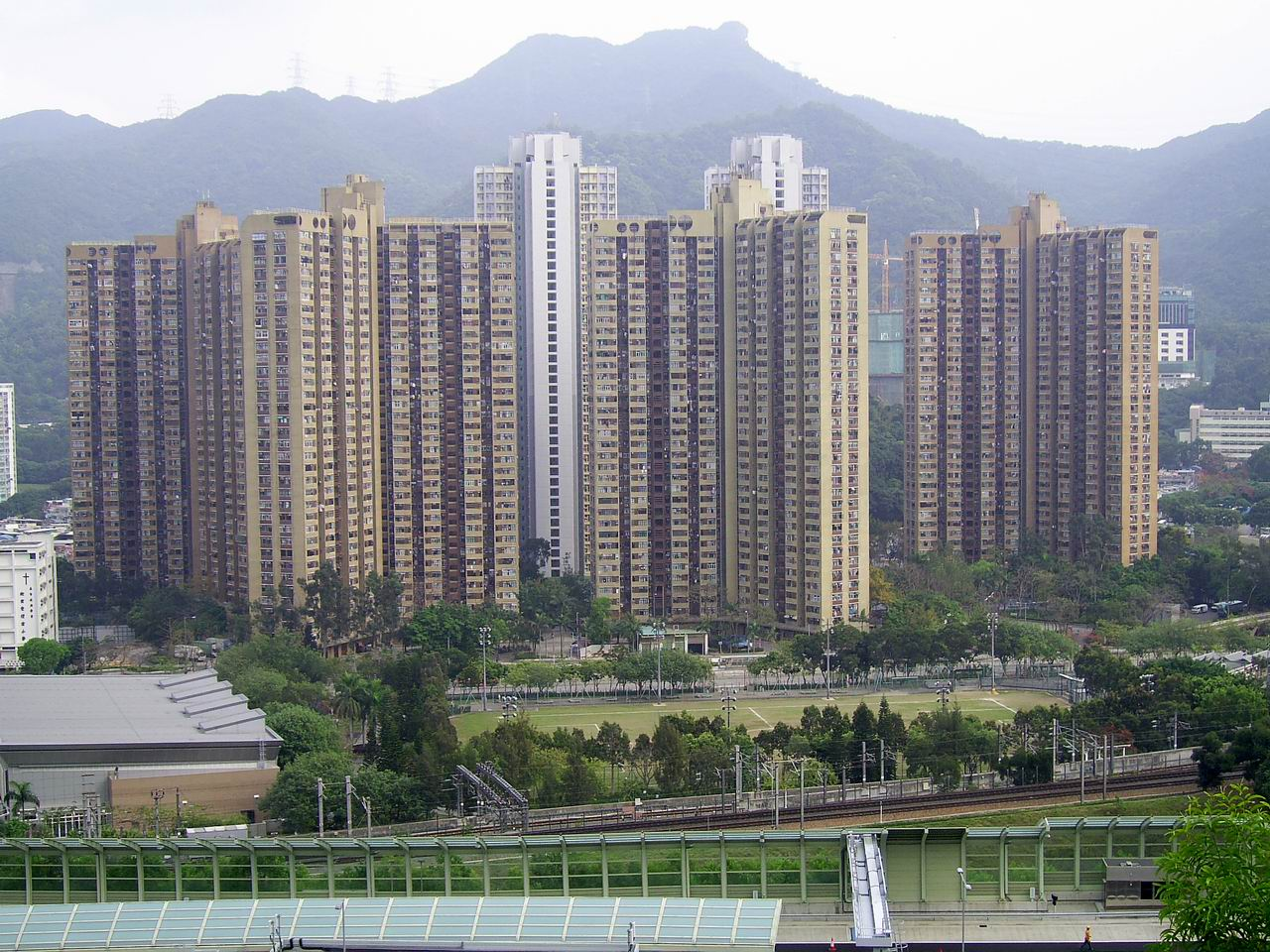
Hin Keng Estate and Ka Keng Court, with Lion Rock in the background.

The table below lists all the public housing estates in Tai Wai, including Public Rental Housing (Public), Home Ownership Scheme (HOS), Tenants Purchase Scheme (TPS) and Private Sector Participation Scheme (PSPS).

Name		Type	Inaug.	No Blocks	No Units	Notes
Carado Garden	雲疊花園	PSPS	1990	6	1,988	
Chun Shek Estate	秦石邨	Public	1984	4	2,166	
Fung Shing Court	豐盛苑	HOS	1985	3	2,448	
Grandway Garden	富嘉花園	PSPS	1989	3	864	
Hin Keng Estate	顯徑邨	TPS	1986	8	1,004	
Hin Yiu Estate	顯耀邨	Public	2005	1	799	
Holford Garden	海福花園	PSPS	1985	3	800	
Ka Keng Court	嘉徑苑	HOS	2002	2	640	
Ka Tin Court	嘉田苑	HOS	1988	6	1,680	
King Tin Court	景田苑	HOS	1983	6	1,424	
Lung Hang Estate	隆亨邨	Public	1983	6	4,376	
May Shing Court	美城苑	HOS	1982	3	2,192	
Mei Chung Court	美松苑	HOS	1996	6	1,940	
Mei Lam Estate	美林邨	Public	1981	4	4,156	
Mei Tin Estate	美田邨	Public	2006	4	3,164	
Sun Chui Estate	新翠邨	Public	1983	8	6,692	
Sun Tin Wai Estate	新田圍邨	Public	1981	8	3,430	

=== Private housing estates ===
==== Festival City ====
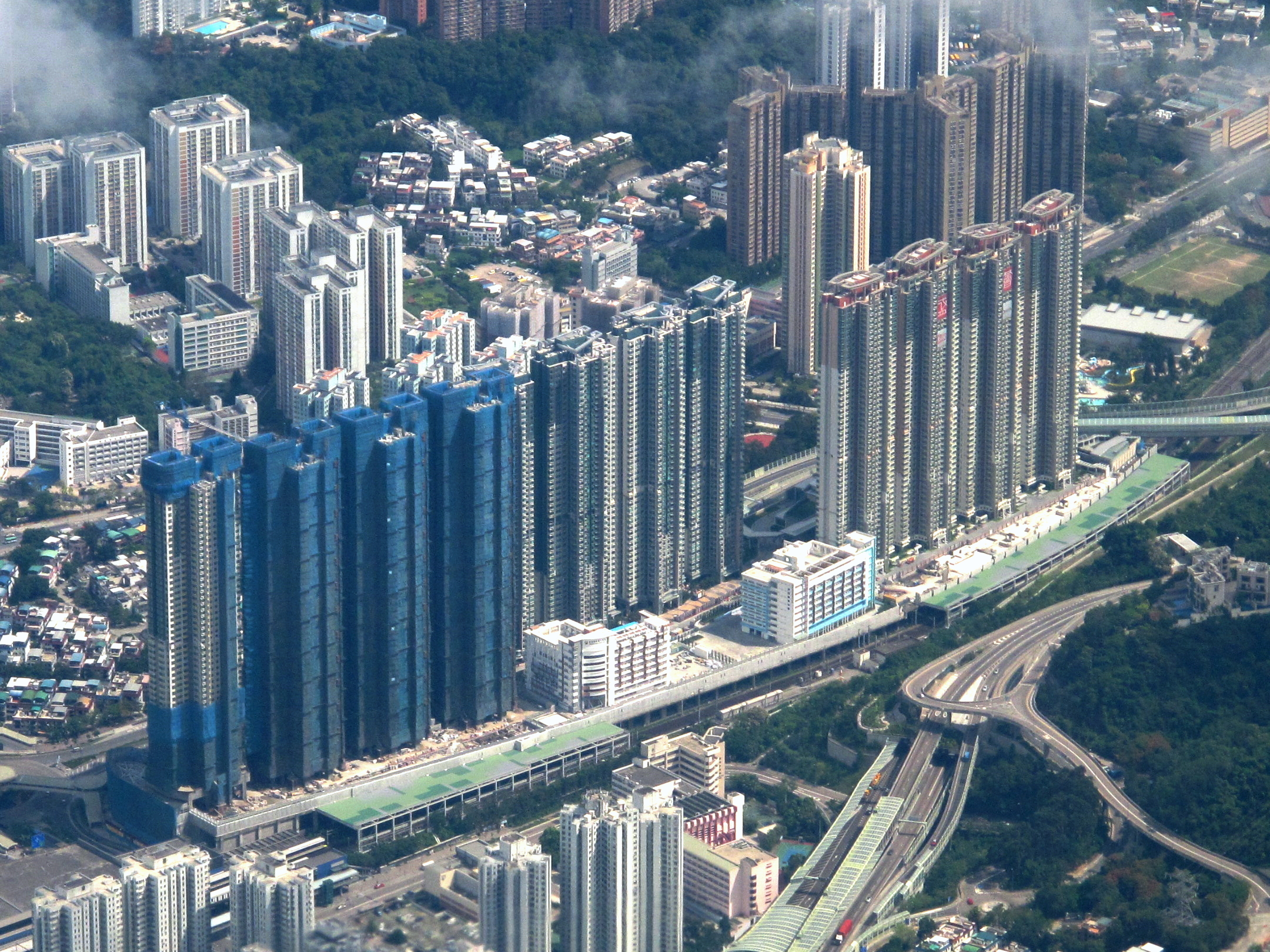
Final stages of the construction of Festival City, in 2011.

Festival City (名城) is a HK$20 billion residential development project by Cheung Kong and MTR Corporation located above the Tai Wai (Station) Maintenance Centre. Phase I was completed in September 2010, Phase II in October 2011, and Phase III in August 2012. The plan was to build 12 50-stories high residential towers with a total construction area of 313,955 square meters as well as 25,890 square meters for the general public's use. It offers 4,264 flats to families, two schools and one community facility. This residential project raised the population of Tai Wai significantly. The controversy of this project is that the 12 towers would create an urban heat island effect and block off the air flow of the area.

=== Other estates ===
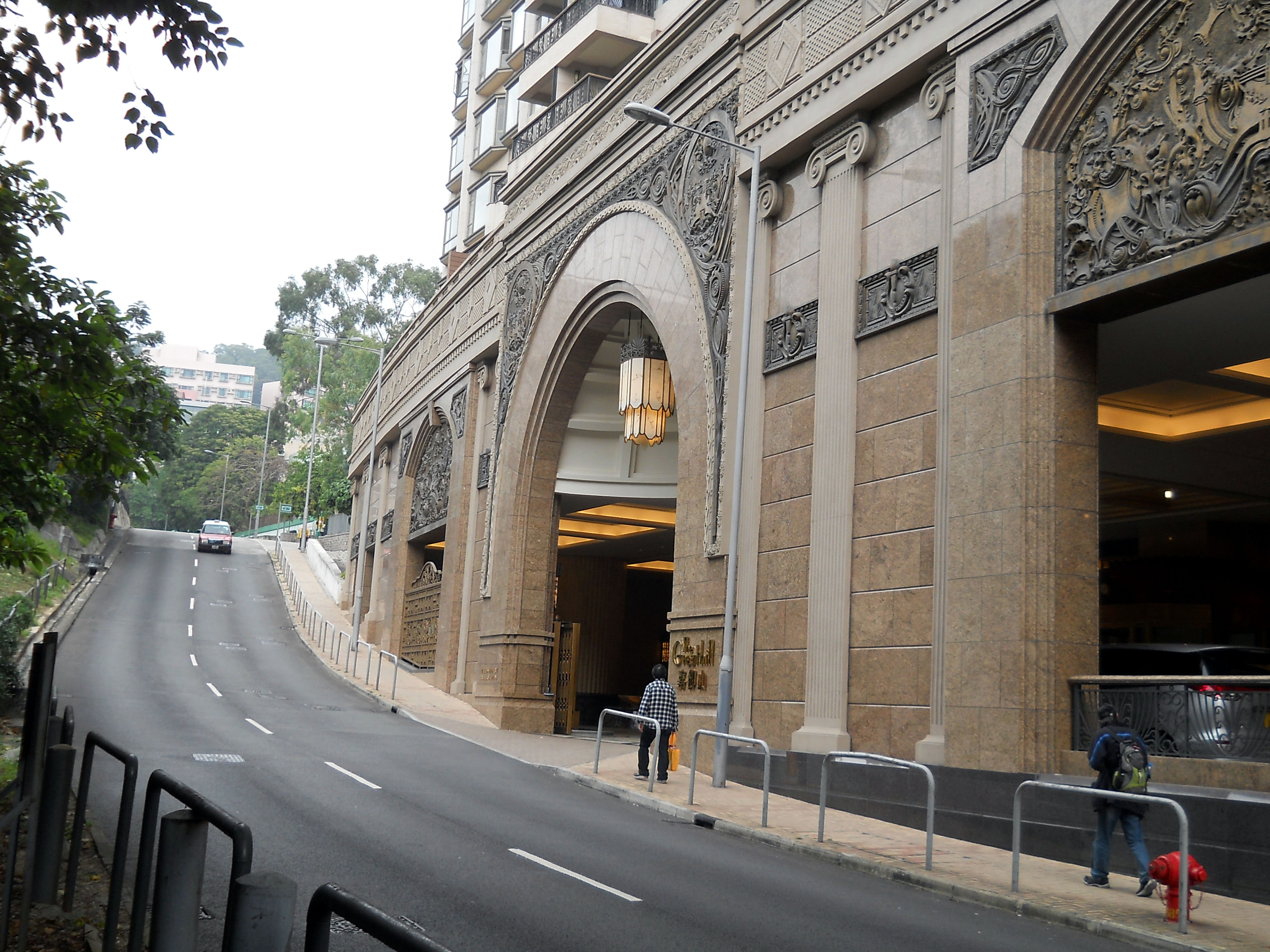
Entrance of The Great Hill along Tung Lo Wan Hill Road.

Other private housing estates in Tai Wai include:

- Glamour Garden (金輝花園)
- Golden Lion Gardens (金獅花園)
- Grandeur Garden (金禧花園)
- Granville Garden (恆峰花園)
- Greenview Garden (愉景花園)
- Julimount Garden (瑞峰花園)
- Lakeview Garden (湖景花園)
- Man Lai Court (文禮閣)
- Parc Royale (聚龍居)
- Park View Garden (翠景花園)
- Peak One (壹號雲頂)
- Pristine Villa (曉翠山莊)
- Sha Tin Heights (沙田嶺)
- The Great Hill (嘉御山)
- The Met. Acappella (薈蕎)
- The Pavilia Farm (柏傲莊)
- Worldwide Gardens (世界花園)

=== Villages ===
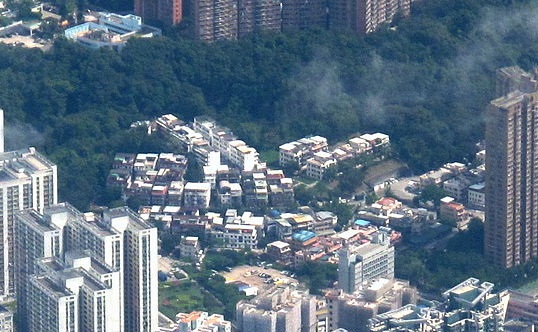
Aerial view of Ha Keng Hau.

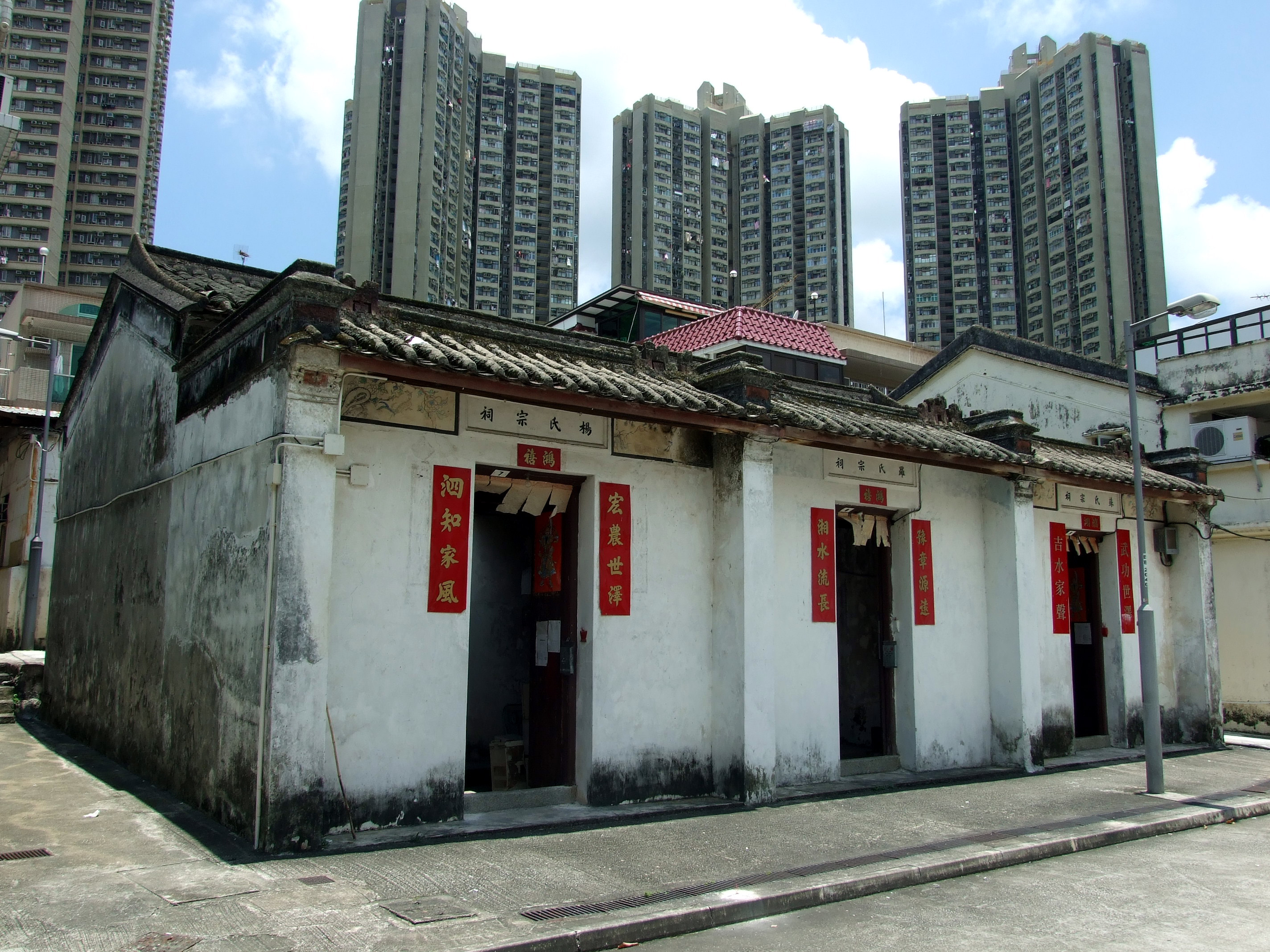
Yeung, Law, and So Ancestral Halls in Hin Tin. The towers in the background are part of Hin Keng Estate.

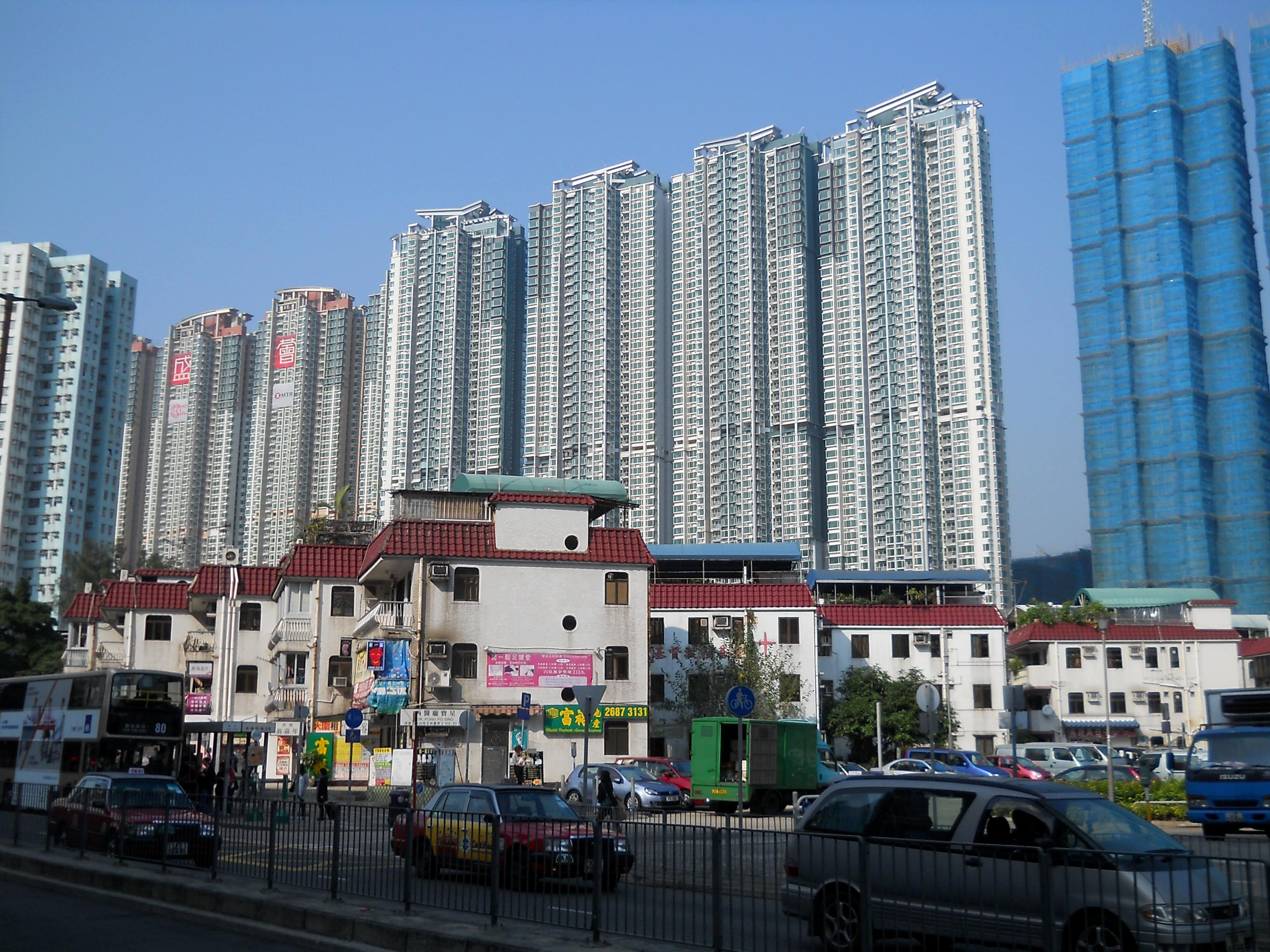
Three-storey village houses of Tin Sam Village, with the towers of Festival City in the background.

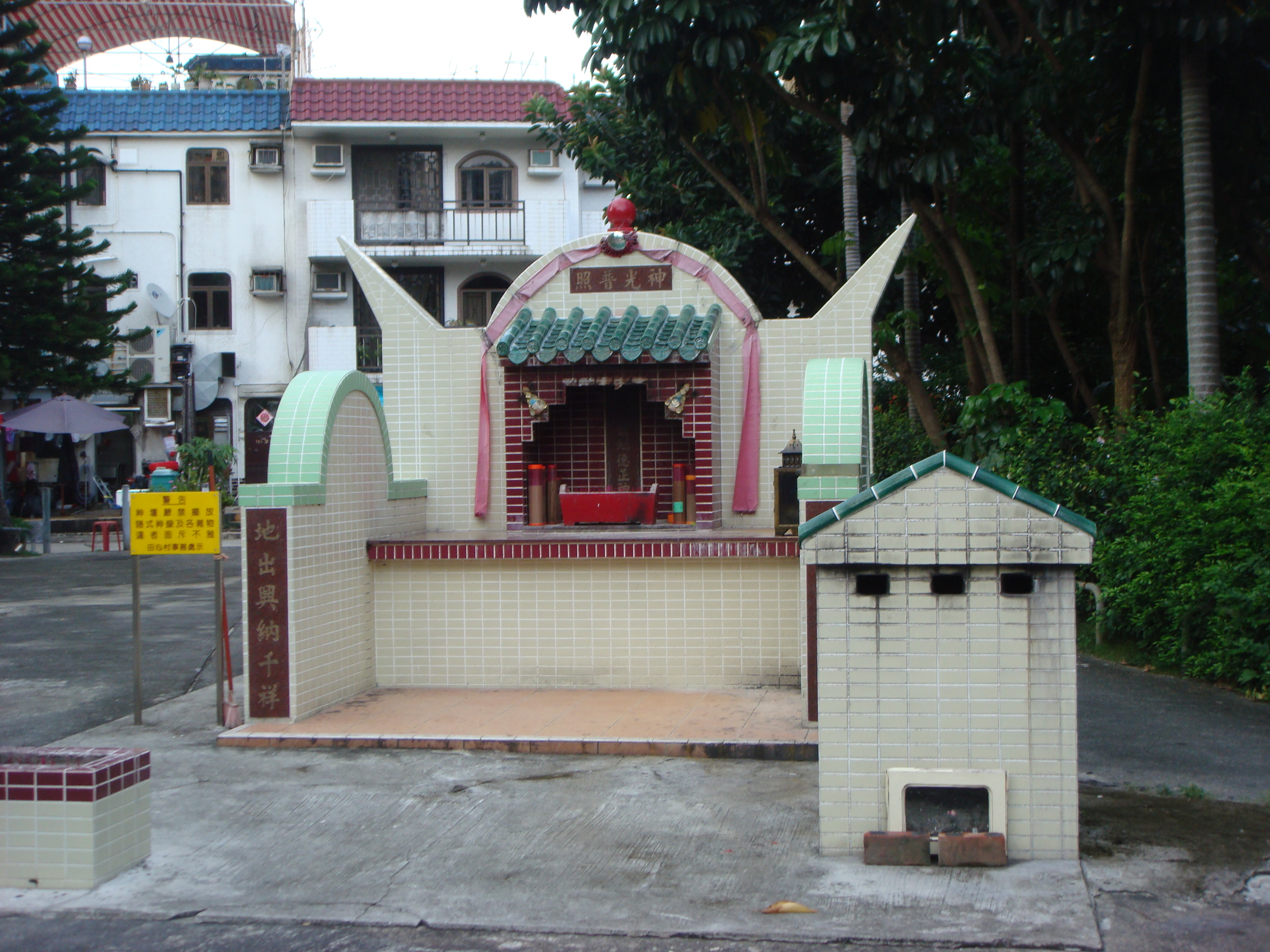
Shrine in Tin Sam Village.

A number of villages exist in Tai Wai and most of them are surrounded by the towers of housing estates. Traditional village layout and some historic buildings can still be found.

- Tai Wai Village, aka. Chik Chuen Wai (22.375674°N 114.178627°E). It is located next to Tai Wai station and the main commercial streets of the area. The village was walled to protect the villagers from bandits, pirates and/or unfriendly neighbours. It was rectangular in shape with 4 watch towers at its four corners. The towers and the walls have long been demolished leaving only the entrance gate and part of the front wall. The houses inside the walls are in rows, and many houses have been built outside the walls due to later development. Historic and traditional buildings include the Entrance Gate, a Hau Wong Temple, the Wai Ancestral Hall and several old houses.
- Tai Wai New Village (大圍新村) (22.375376°N 114.174181°E) is located on a slope alongside Tai Po Road, just minutes walk away from the old village. It was established in the 1980s as the then colonial government's effort to compensate the villagers for effectively confiscating their land for development. Each male villager was given a piece of land at a premium of HK$20,000 of which he has the right to build a Spanish-styled 700 sq.ft. three-story house to live in. Most of these houses are now rented by outsiders for the relatively tranquil countryside surroundings. The land occupied by the village was once cultivated for pineapples.

Ha Keng Hau, Sheung Keng Hau and Hin Tin are three adjacent villages located along Hin Keng Street (顯徑街), along a northeast–southwest direction. Hin Keng Estate, located northeast of the villages and across Hin Keng Street, was named after them.

- Ha Keng Hau (下徑口) (22.364998°N 114.176107°E) is located east of Hin Keng Estate and west of Lung Hang Estate. It was established by the Law (羅) and the Mak (麥) during the 18th century. The Mak who settled there had branched out of Pan Chung (泮涌) in Tai Po.
- Sheung Keng Hau (上徑口) (22.364065°N 114.174439°E) is located southeast of Hin Keng Estate. It is a single-surname village, Wai (韋), with a history of over 300 years. The Wai Ancestral Hall was rebuilt in 1930.
- Hin Tin (顯田) (22.362394°N 114.172475°E) is located south of the main part of Hin Keng Estate. The village was erected with government funding in the 1920s to resettle three clans of villagers from Shek Lei Pui Valley (石梨貝谷), to make way for the construction of the Shek Lei Pui Reservoir, completed in 1925. Some 80 people lived in 26 houses in the former Shek Lei Pui Village. The Yeung (楊), the Law (羅) and the So (蘇) were Hakkas from Nantou who had settled in the Valley for some 300 years. Another clan in the Valley, the Lau (劉), moved to Kwai Chung instead of Hin Tin at the resettlement. The ancestral halls of the three clans were built in Hin Tin, connected together to form a single block on the front row of the original three rows of houses. They have been listed as Grade III historic buildings since 2010. In 1982, the Housing Department demolished 600 structures at Hin Tin and relocated 167 families.

Villages in the vicinity of Che Kung Temple:

- Kak Tin (隔田) (22.367575°N 114.183386°E) is located south of Sun Chui Estate and Sun Tin Wai Estate. It was one of the five Punti villages in Sha Tin founded about 400 years ago by Tsang (曾) clanspeople, originally from Shandong. The villagers were historically farmers engaged in rice and vegetable growing supported by pig and poultry rearing. The village had a population of 130 in 1899 and 220 in 1960. About 80 households of the Tsangs are still residing in the village. Most of the village houses have been demolished and replaced by modern small houses.
- Hung Mui Kuk Village (紅梅谷村) (22.36582°N 114.181639°E)
- San Tin Village (not to be confused with San Tin within Yuen Long District), (新田村) (22.371821°N 114.182821°E) is located south of Che Kung Temple and east of Sun Chui Estate. It was historically a single-clan village of the Lau (劉), and it now features the Lau Ancestral Hall (劉氏家祠). The Lau were Hakkas who first moved from Huizhou to Grassy Hill, northwest of Sha Tin, during the 18th century. They were farmers engaged in cultivation. As their population increased, they bought a piece of land from the Kak Tin and Tin Sam villages and established a new village called 'San Tin' (lit. "new field") in the late 1890s.
- Lei Uk Tsuen (李屋村) (22.373733°N 114.184922°E) is located east of Che Kung Temple and west of Chun Shek Estate. It was established by the Lei clan in the late 17th century.
- Sha Tin Tau (沙田頭) (22.373225°N 114.189234°E) is located east of Chun Shek Estate, north of Fung Shing Court and south of Tsang Tai Uk. Historically the only Hakka multi-surname village in the Sha Tin area, it was first settled by the Chan (陳) and later by the Law (羅), the Lam (林), the Yip (葉), the Lau (劉) and others. There are several ancestral halls in the village, including the Lau Ancestral Hall (劉氏家祠), that was built before 1900. The founding ancestor of the Lau clan of Sha Tin Tau village moved from Longchuan in the mid-19th century. The clan has lived there for nine generations by the early 21st century.
- Sha Tin Tau New Village (沙田頭新村) (22.368677°N 114.189588°E)

Other villages in Tai Wai include:

- Heung Fan Liu New Village (香粉寮新村) (22.377103°N 114.168134°E) is located near the Tai Wai Nullah, north of Mei Tin Estate and east of the Lower Shing Mun Reservoir.
- Luk Hop Village (六合村) (22.363800°N 114.164286°E) is located on the hill along Tai Po Road and on top of Sha Tin Heights Tunnel.
- Fuk Lok Village (福樂村) (22.387209°N 114.168031°E) is located on the hill, north of Heung Fan Liu New Village and Pak Tin.
- Pak Tin (白田) (22.384364°N 114.170885°E) is located west of Mei Chung Court. At the time of the 1911 census, the population of Pak Tin was 3.
- Tin Sam Village (田心圍) (22.369805°N 114.178170°E) is located west of Sun Chui Estate, north of Lung Hang Estate, and southeast of Festival City. It was a Punti walled village, historically inhabited by the Choi (蔡), the Wai (韋), the Leung (梁), the Tsang (曾) and the Liu (廖). A moat was built for its protection, and was later filled up and used as a fish pond. Historic buildings in the village include the Choi Ancestral Hall, the Leung Ancestral Halls, the Liu Ancestral Hall, and the Entrance Gate, built during the Qing dynasty. The Che Kung Temple in Tai Wai was originally built and managed by the Tin Sam Village, but the village lost its managerial rights in the late 19th century.
- Tung Lo Wan (銅鑼灣) (22.378366°N 114.181038°E) is located east of Mei Lam Estate, across the Tai Wai Nullah. It was historically a Hakka village occupied by families of different surnames, the Yau (邱) being the majority. The first generation of the Tse clan who settled in the village moved to Tung Lo Wan in the early 20th century. The Tse Ancestral Hall (謝氏祠堂), also called Tse Po Shu Tong (謝寶樹堂), was built before 1910. It is the only ancestral hall in the village. The Li Cottage (玉山艸堂), located nearby, at the corner of Tung Lo Wan Hill Road and Chung Ling Road, was built around 1918. It is connected by a path to the Li Tomb (李玉山伉儷墓) uphill.
- Yau Oi Tsuen (友愛村) (22.386150°N 114.177408°E), located west of Tao Fung Shan.

== Retail ==
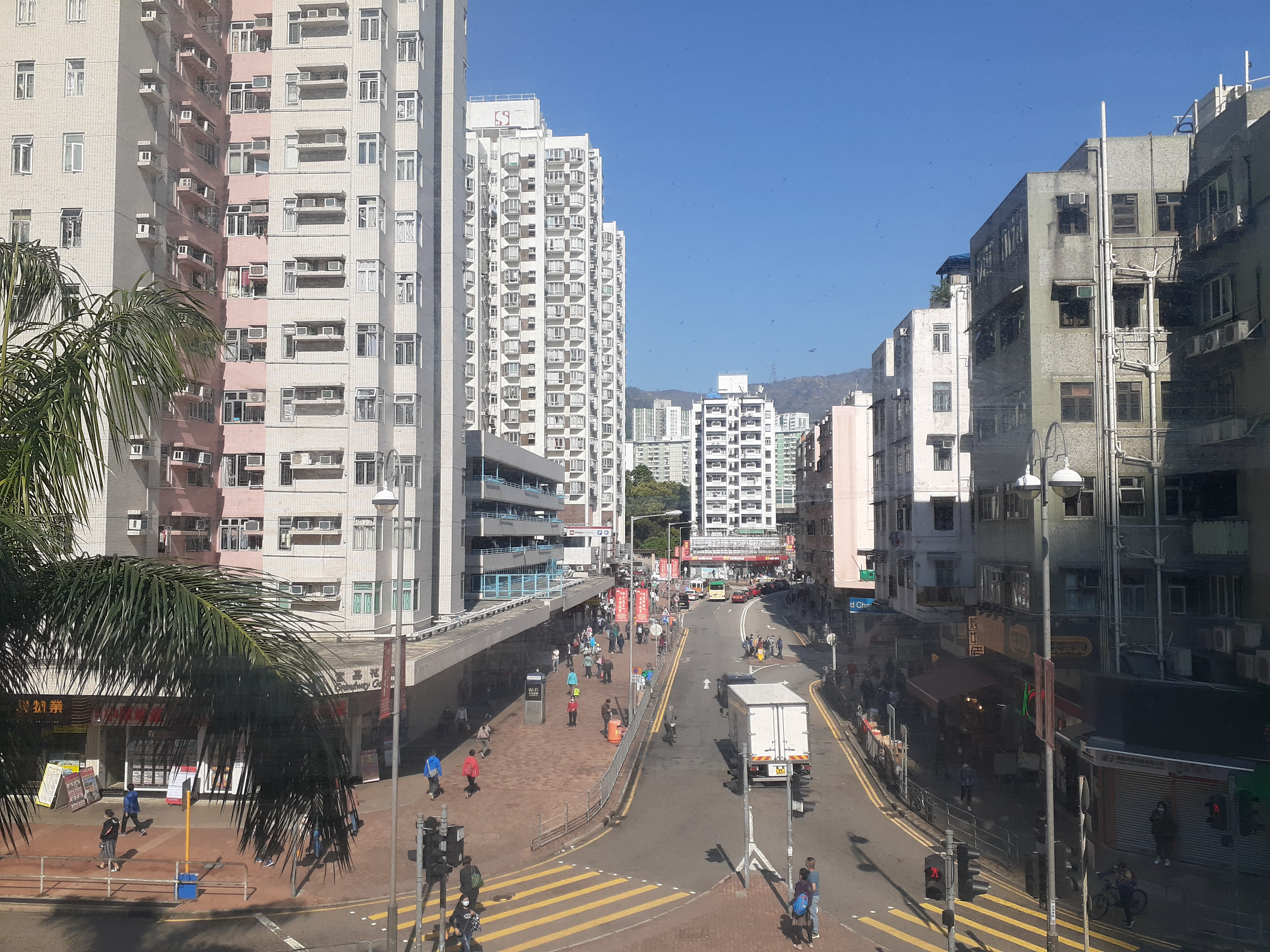
Tai Wai Road (大圍道) viewed from Tai Wai Station. The buildings on the left are part of Grandway Garden.

Several public housing estates have a shopping centre. The only private shopping centre was Grandeur Shopping Arcade (金禧商場), located within Grandeur Garden, along Tai Wai Road (大圍道), until The Wai shopping mall opened in 2023.

The Wai (圍方) opened on 22 July 2023. Located on top of Tai Wai Station and below the Pavilia Farm residential complex, the shopping mall covers an area 650,000 sq ft across four floors. At the time of its opening, The Wai housed the largest of the then 43 Market Place supermarkets in Hong Kong, covering an area over 20,000sq ft.

== Recreational ==
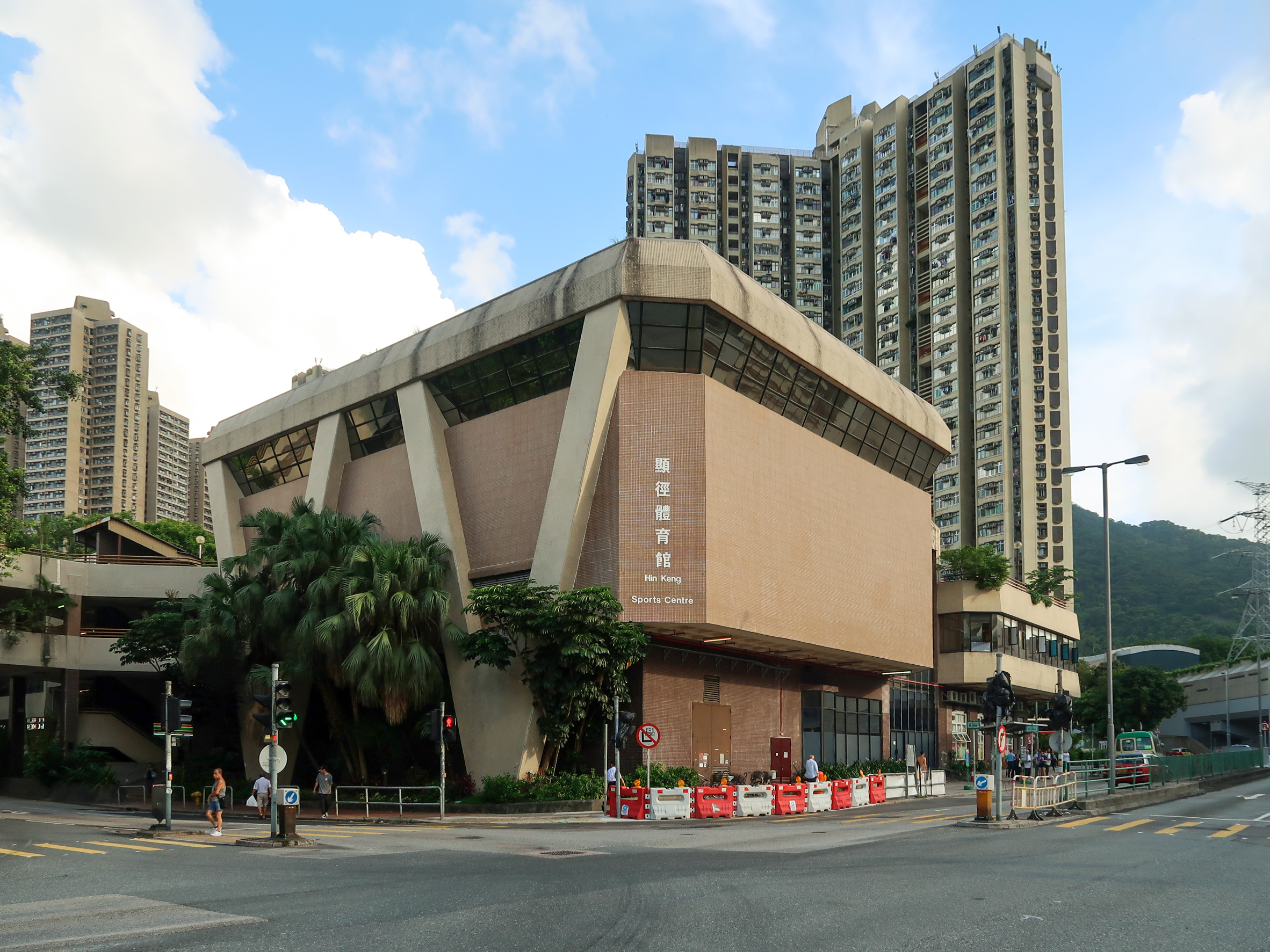
Hin Keng Sports Centre, at the corner of Che Kung Miu Road and Hin Keng Street.

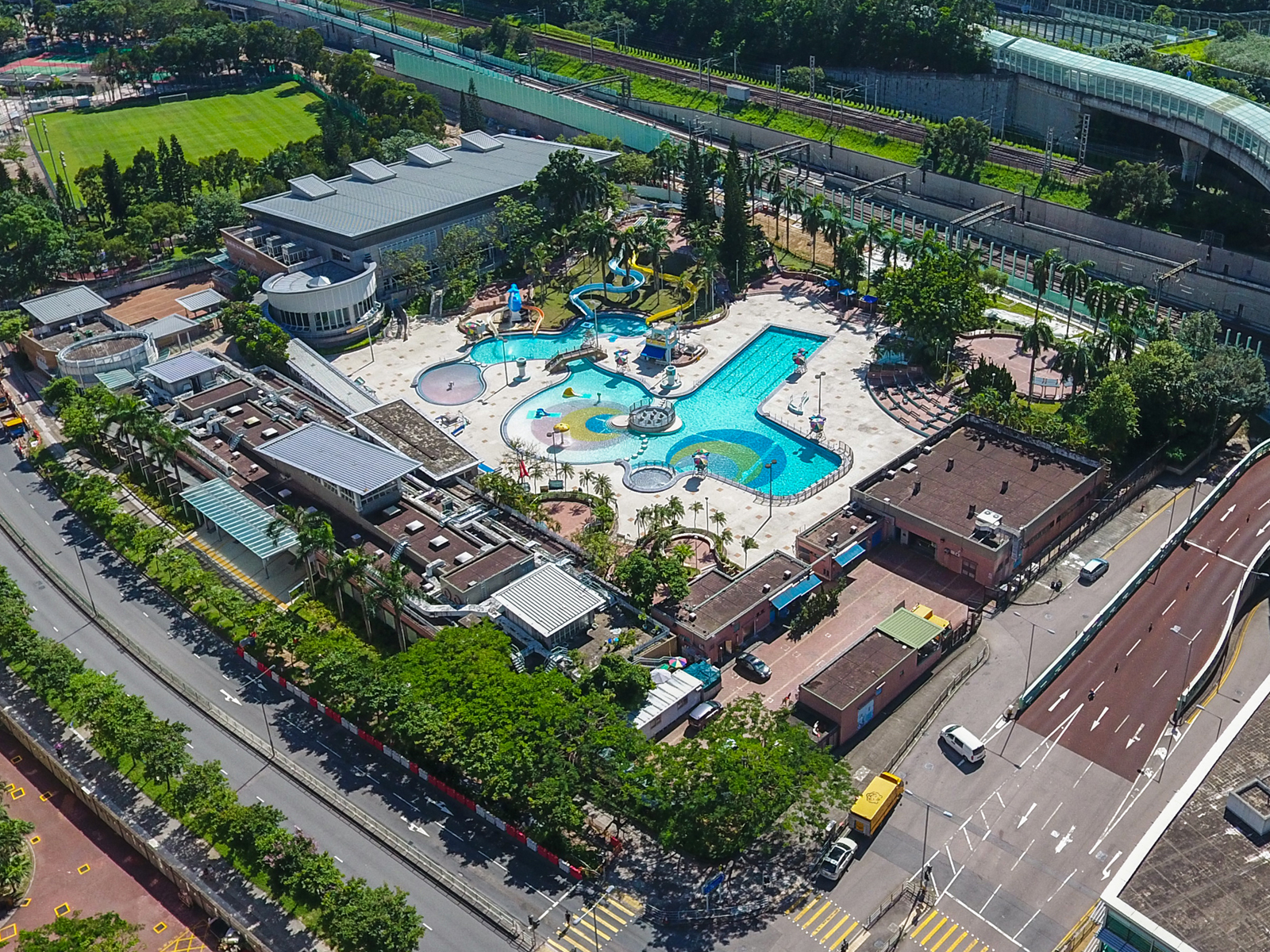
Hin Tin Swimming Pool

=== Sports venues ===
Sports venues in Tai Wai include:

==== Sports centres ====
There are three indoor public sport centres in Tai Wai: Che Kung Temple Sports Centre (opened in 2020), Hin Keng Sports Centre (opened in 1988) and Mei Lam Sports Centre (opened in 1986). They are located in or next to major estates, namely Chun Shek Estate, Hin Keng Estate and Mei Lam Estate. They offer a wide range of facilities including a fitness centre with weight training and cardiovascular equipment, squash courts as well as badminton courts. These sport centres are owned and operated by the Leisure and Cultural Services Department; however, the facilities are charged prior to booking with several exceptions.

==== Swimming pool ====
Hin Tin Swimming Pool (顯田游泳池) is the only public swimming pool in Tai Wai. Opened in 1992, it is operated by the Leisure and Cultural Services Department. It is located along Che Kung Miu Road, between Tai Wai station and Hin Keng station.

==== Cycling ====
The Tai Wai Cycling Park, where beginners could practice their cycling skills, was demolished in 2001 to make way for the railway terminus of the Ma On Shan Line. A number of bicycle rental shops can be found in Tai Wai and bicycle lanes run along the Shing Mun River and link Tai Wai to Tai Po, Ma On Shan and Plover Cove Reservoir.

=== Hiking ===
Hiking is also a popular activity in Tai Wai. Situated at the end of a valley, Tai Wai is surrounded by country parks: Shing Mun (north), Kam Shan (west), Lion Rock (south) and Ma On Shan (southeast). Sections of the Wilson Trail and the MacLehose Trail run across the hills near Tai Wai.

=== Food ===
Some sources mention Tai Wai as being famous for its chicken porridges and roast baby pigeon.

== Schools ==
Tai Wai is in Primary One Admission (POA) School Net 88. Within the school net are multiple aided schools (operated independently but funded with government money) and Shatin Government Primary School (沙田官立小學).

Tai Wai has multiple primary and secondary schools, mostly public, some with religious background. They include:

- Buddhist Wong Wan Tin College
- Carmel Alison Lam Primary School
- Cheng Wing Gee College
- Christian Alliance Cheng Wing Gee College
- Free Methodist Bradbury Chun Lei Primary School
- Free Methodist Mei Lam Primary School
- Helen Liang Memorial Secondary School (Shatin)
- Immaculate Heart of Mary School
- Lau Pak Lok Secondary School
- Lock Tao Secondary School
- Ng Yuk Secondary School
- Po Leung Kuk Dr. Jimmy Wong Chi-ho (Tin Sum Valley) Primary School
- Pui Kiu College
- Sha Tin Government Secondary School
- Shatin Public Mei Lin Primary School
- Shatin Public School
- Shatin Tsung Tsin Secondary School
- Sir Chu Wan Primary School
- Sung Lan Middle School
- T.W.G.H's Lam Shiu Primary School

== Religion ==
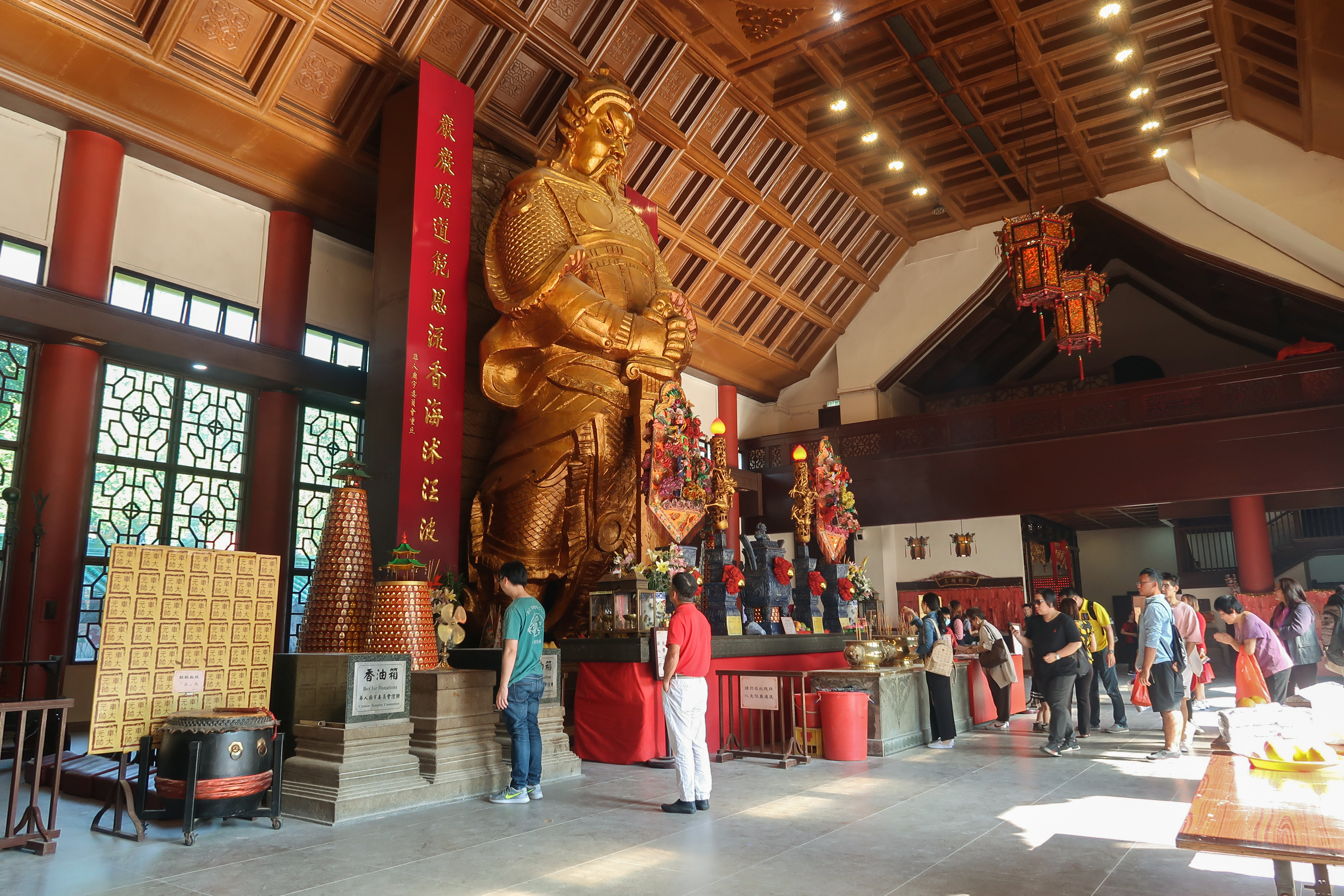
Che Kung Temple

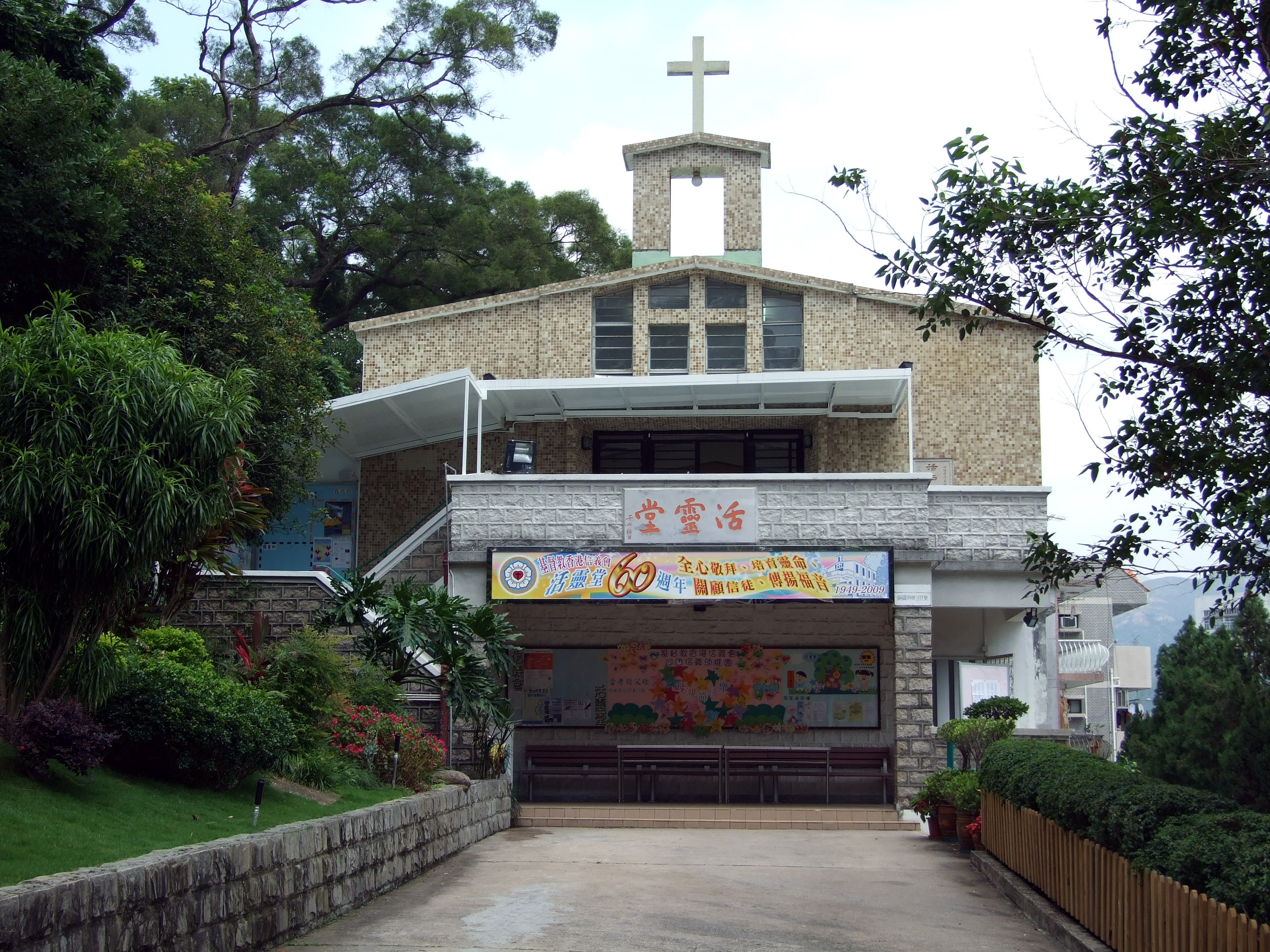
ELCHK Living Spirit Lutheran Church

=== Temples ===
- Che Kung Temple: Hundreds of thousands flock to the Taoist Che Kung Temple on the second day of each Chinese New Year to worship Che Kung – a general of the Song dynasty, and queue up to turn the wheel which symbolizes both the cosmic movement in the turning of the year and the hope of each wheel spinner for a good turn of fortune in the forthcoming year.
- Chi Hong Ching Yuen, also Tze Hong Monastery (慈航靜苑). Located next to Che Kung Temple. It is a Buddhist nunnery established in the early 20th century.
- Koon Ngam Ching Yuen, also Ku Ngam Ching Yuen or Ku Au Tseng Yuen or "Wat Tai Wai" (古巖淨苑) near Lei Uk Tsuen. It is a Chinese Thai temple established in the early 1990s.
- A Hau Wong Temple is located within Tai Wai walled village. Originally sited outside the walled village, it was moved inside during the reign of Xianfeng (1850–1861). The current temple has replaced an earlier temple, probably built in 1884 and demolished in 1982.
- Puguangming Temple (普光明寺), near Pak Tin Village and directly north of Mei Chung Court. Contains a controversial private columbarium.
- Shun Shin Chee Kit Yin Koon (信善玄宮), near Pak Tin Village and directly west of Mei Chung Court. It also houses a private colombarium.

=== Christian institutions ===
- Tao Fung Shan:
  - Tao Fong Shan Christian Centre
  - Tao Fong Shan Christ Temple
  - Lutheran Theological Seminary
  - ELCHK Living Spirit Lutheran Church
- ELCHK Salvation Lutheran Church
- High Rock Centre (基督教靈基營暨中心). Built in 1924 as Shatin Police Station, it became High Rock Christian Camp in 1980.
- St. Alfred's Church (聖歐爾發堂)
- Shatin Assembly of God Church (沙田神召會)

== Other structures and facilities ==
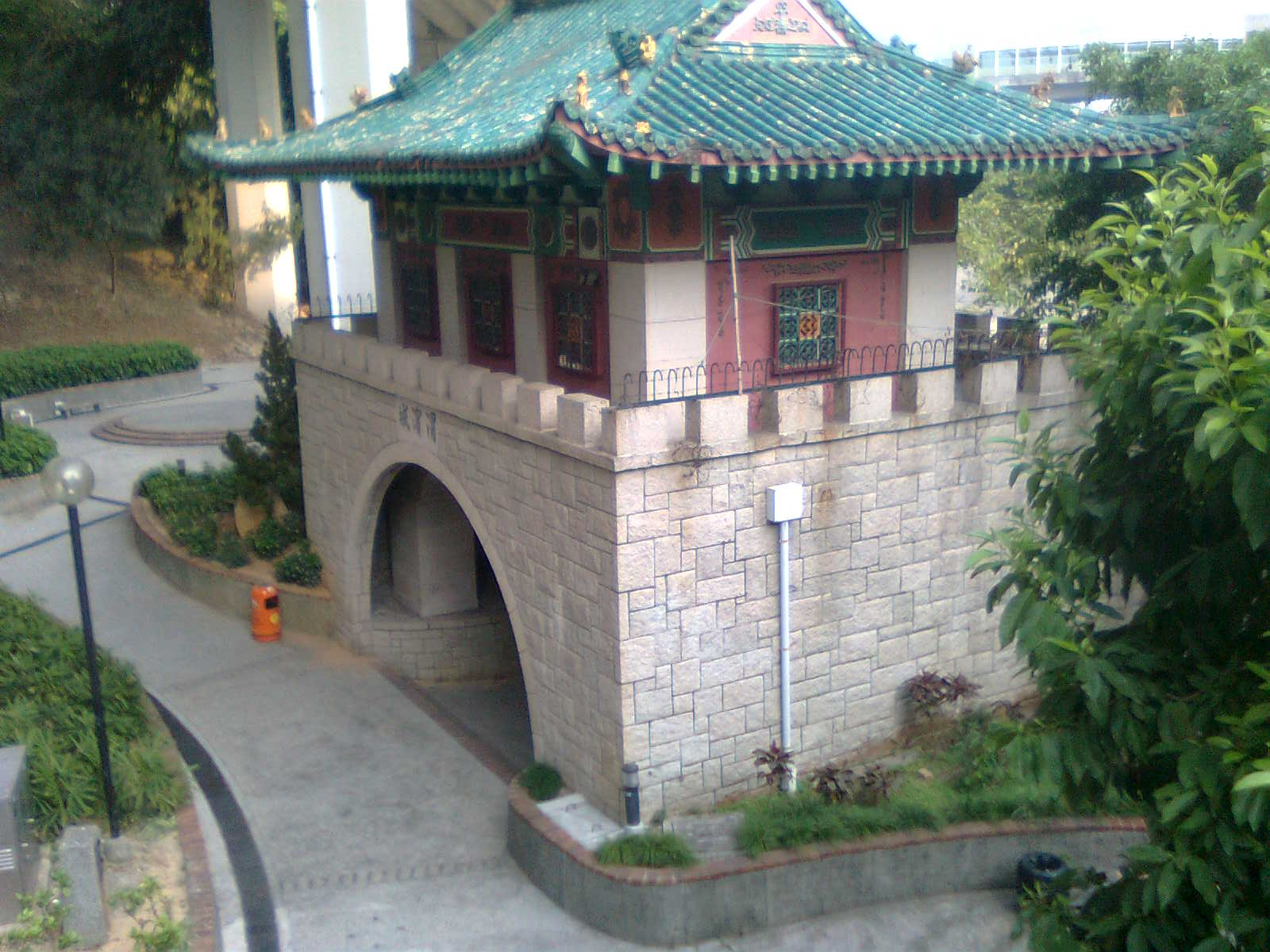
Wai Bun Castle

Other historic or otherwise notable buildings and structures in Tai Wai include:

- Former Kowloon-Canton Railway (KCR) Beacon Hill Tunnel (前畢架山隧道). Completed in 1910, now disused as a rail transport tunnel.
- Fu Shan Public Mortuary (富山公眾殮房)
- Hong Kong Heritage Museum, located at the border between Tai Wai and Sha Tin
- Lower Shing Mun Reservoir
- Po Fook Memorial Hall (寶福紀念館)
- Tai Wai Bunker Complex (大圍地堡), a former military structure along Gin Drinkers Line, located at the foothill of Tai Wai.
- Tai Wai industrial area has an area of about 4.70 ha and included 8 industrial buildings in 2005.
- Tai Wai Maintenance Centre (港鐵大圍車廠), a maintenance depot of the MTR, supporting the Tuen Ma line
- Union Hospital (Hong Kong)
- Wai Bun Castle (博雅山莊 or 渭濱城)

== Transport ==
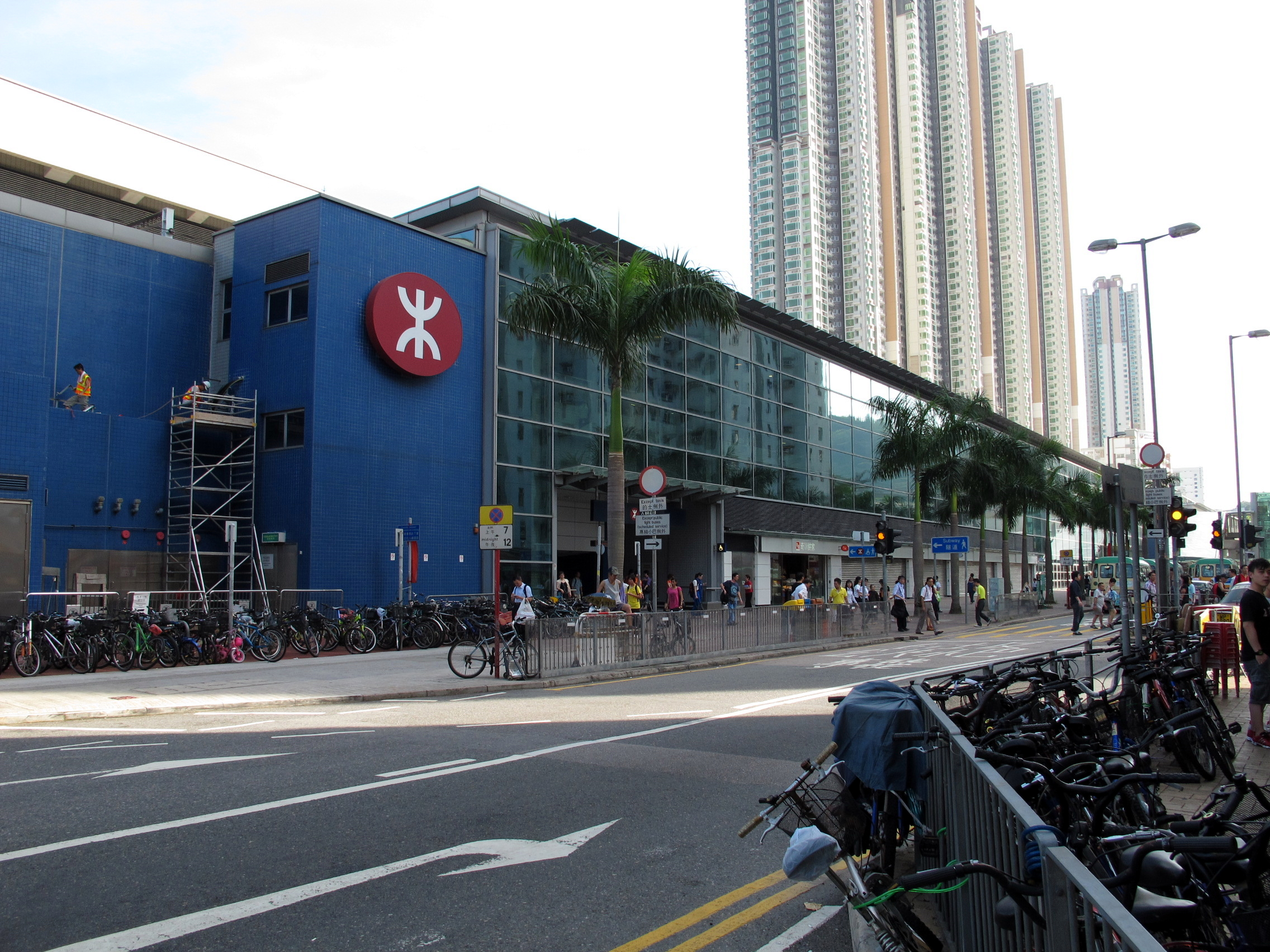
Exterior of Tai Wai station in 2012.

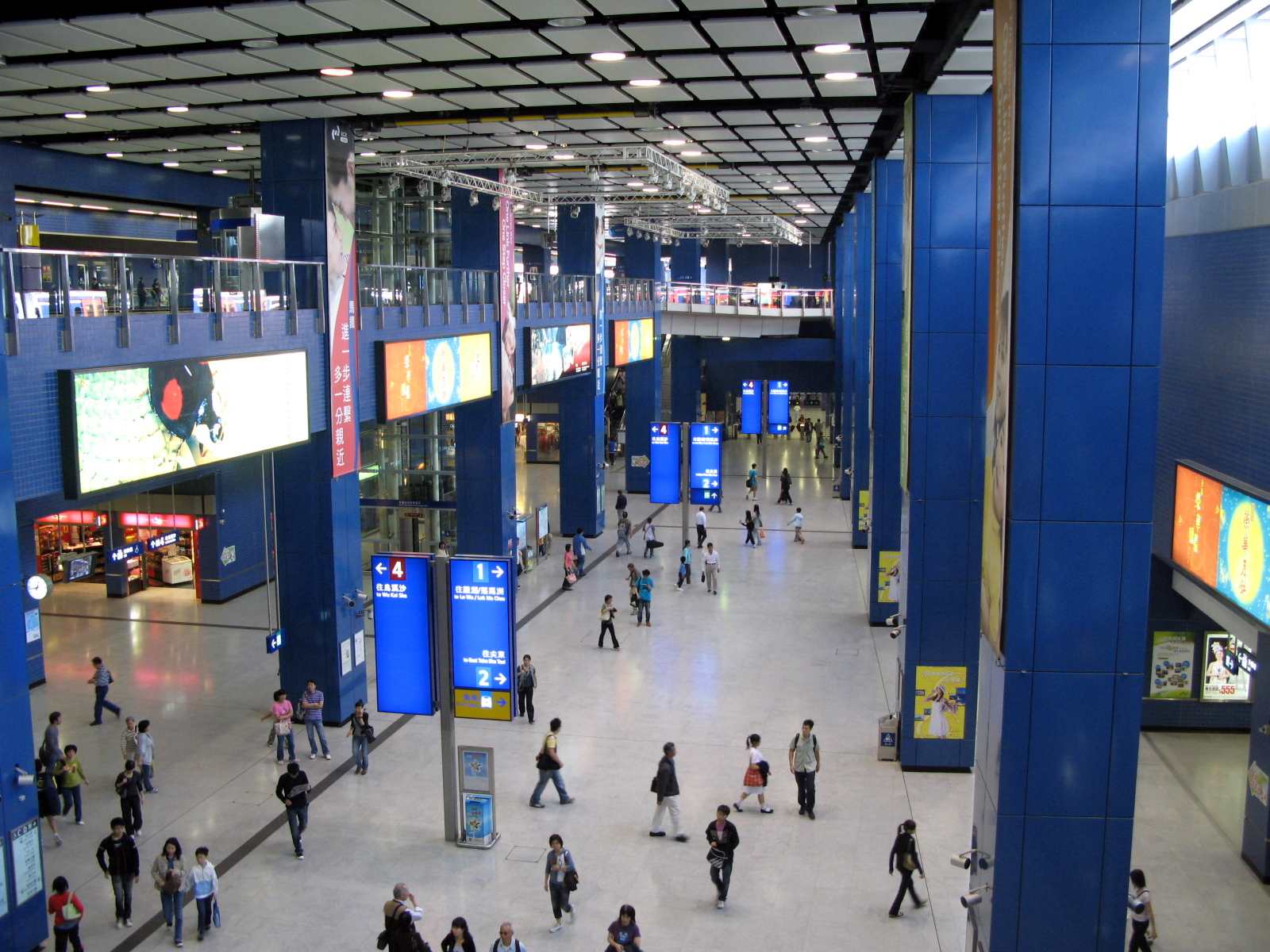
Interior of Tai Wai station.

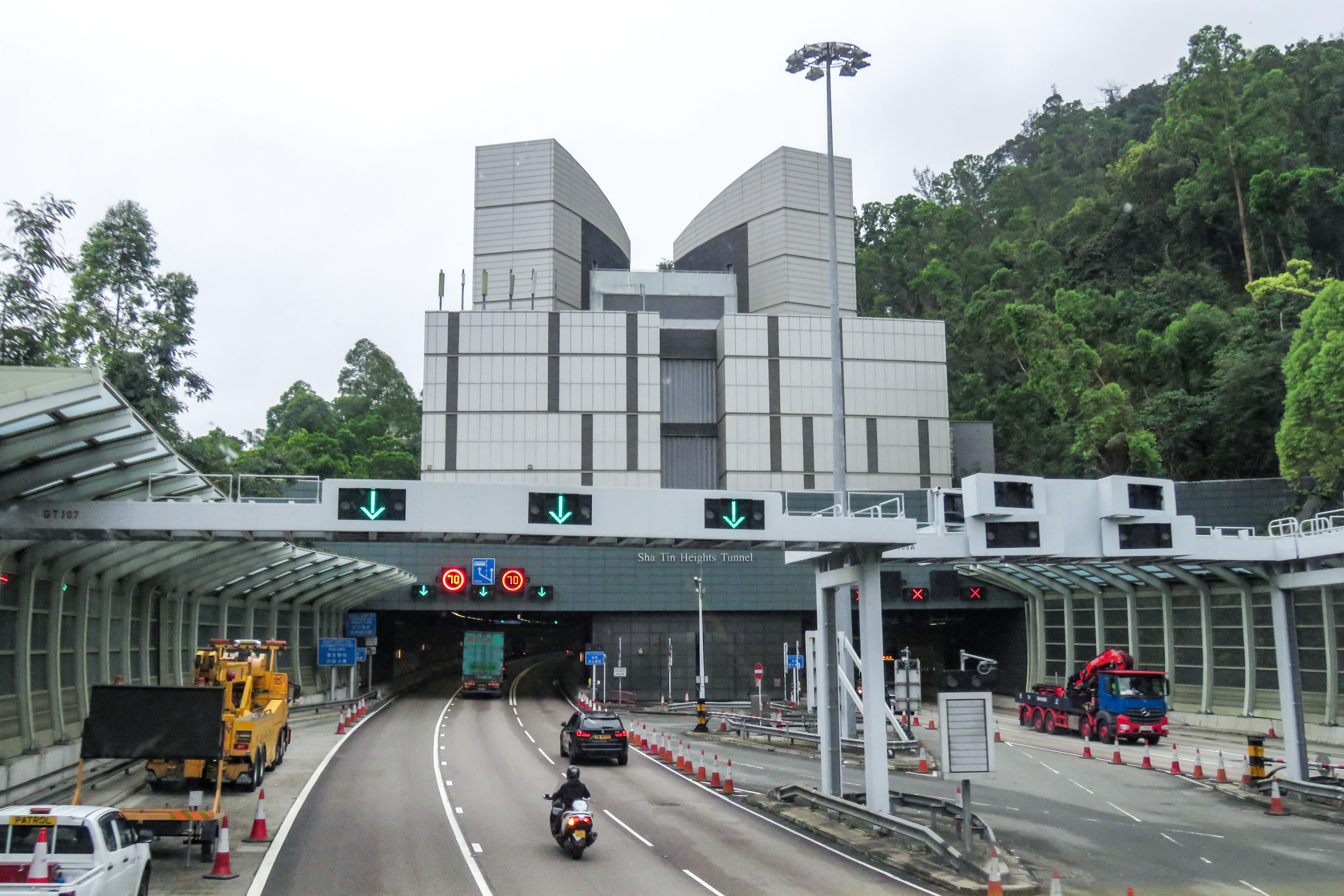
Northern portal of Sha Tin Heights Tunnel, in Tai Wai.

=== MTR ===
Tai Wai station is on the East Rail line and the Tuen Ma line of the MTR. The northward termini of the East Rail line, Lo Wu and Lok Ma Chau stations, located at the border with Shenzhen, are about 30 minutes away. The station was opened in 1983 and its expansion for the Ma On Shan line was completed in September 2004.

Che Kung Temple station of the Tuen Ma line is also located in the Tai Wai area. It opened in 2004.

In 2002, KCRC won the bid to plan, build and operate the Sha Tin to Central Link, and in 2004 it submitted the Draft Final Proposal to the Government. The March 2008 MTR-KCR revised proposal includes the extension of East Rail line across Victoria Harbour to Hong Kong Island and the extension of Ma On Shan line to West Rail line via East Kowloon. The Tai Wai to Hung Hom section was fully completed in 2021 and the Cross Harbour section was completed in 2022. As part of this project, a new station was built in the Tai Wai area, Hin Keng station, which opened in February 2020.

=== Road connections ===
Tai Wai is the main gateway of tunnels and roads connecting the New Territories to Kowloon as well as Tsuen Wan due to its convenient location. In the early 20th century and until the Lion Rock Tunnel, the first road tunnel in Hong Kong, was built in 1967, Tai Po Road was the main road connecting Tai Wai and the New Territories to Kowloon. Tai Po Road to this day remains as the only toll-free road connecting the two areas.

The tunnels are: Lion Rock Tunnel (1967), Shing Mun Tunnels (1990) and Sha Tin Heights Tunnel (2008). Sha Tin Heights Tunnel opened in March 2008 to lessen the traffic of the Kowloon Tunnels and Tai Po Road. It is part of Route 8 that connects Tai Wai to the airport over the Stonecutters Bridge and through the Nam Wan Tunnel.

=== Bus ===
A large percentage of the bus routes that go past Tai Wai are circular routes which both start and terminate in Sha Tin. There are also long-distance routes that go past famous Hong Kong landmarks and attractions. They include 170, which goes to Ocean Park; E42 goes to the airport (via Tung Chung) and R42 to Disneyland.

There are 5 major bus termini in Tai Wai:

- Mei Lam (美林巴士總站)
- Mei Tin (美田巴士總站)
- Sun Chui (新翠巴士總站)
- Hin Keng (顯徑巴士總站)
- Tai Wai Station (大圍站總站)

=== Minibus ===
Many green minibus (GMB) routes that pass Tai Wai go around all parts of Sha Tin to provide feeder services for major public transport operators such as the MTR. Routes such as 481B go to the Tsuen Wan area via Shing Mun Tunnel offering a fast but cheap alternative to buses and the MTR. Residents' buses also operate at Tai Wai station. Union Hospital's free shuttle bus also operates from there at 10-minute frequencies.

== See also ==
- Sha Tin Heights, a hill in Tai Wai.
