= STTSS =

STTSS may refer to:

- Sabah Tshung Tsin Secondary School, Kota Kinabalu, Sabah, Malaysia
- Shatin Tsung Tsin Secondary School, Sha Tin, Hong Kong

== See also ==
- Service Tunnel Transport System, expressed as STTS
