= Ha Keng Hau =

Coordinates: 22.365059°N 114.175948°E

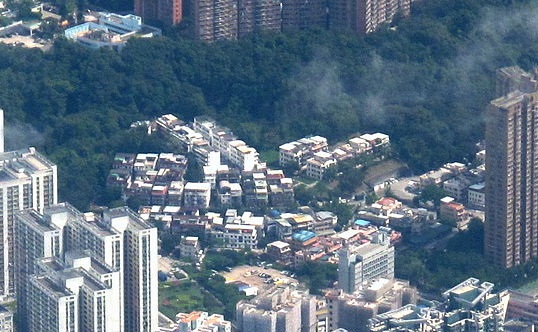
Aerial view of Ha Keng Hau.

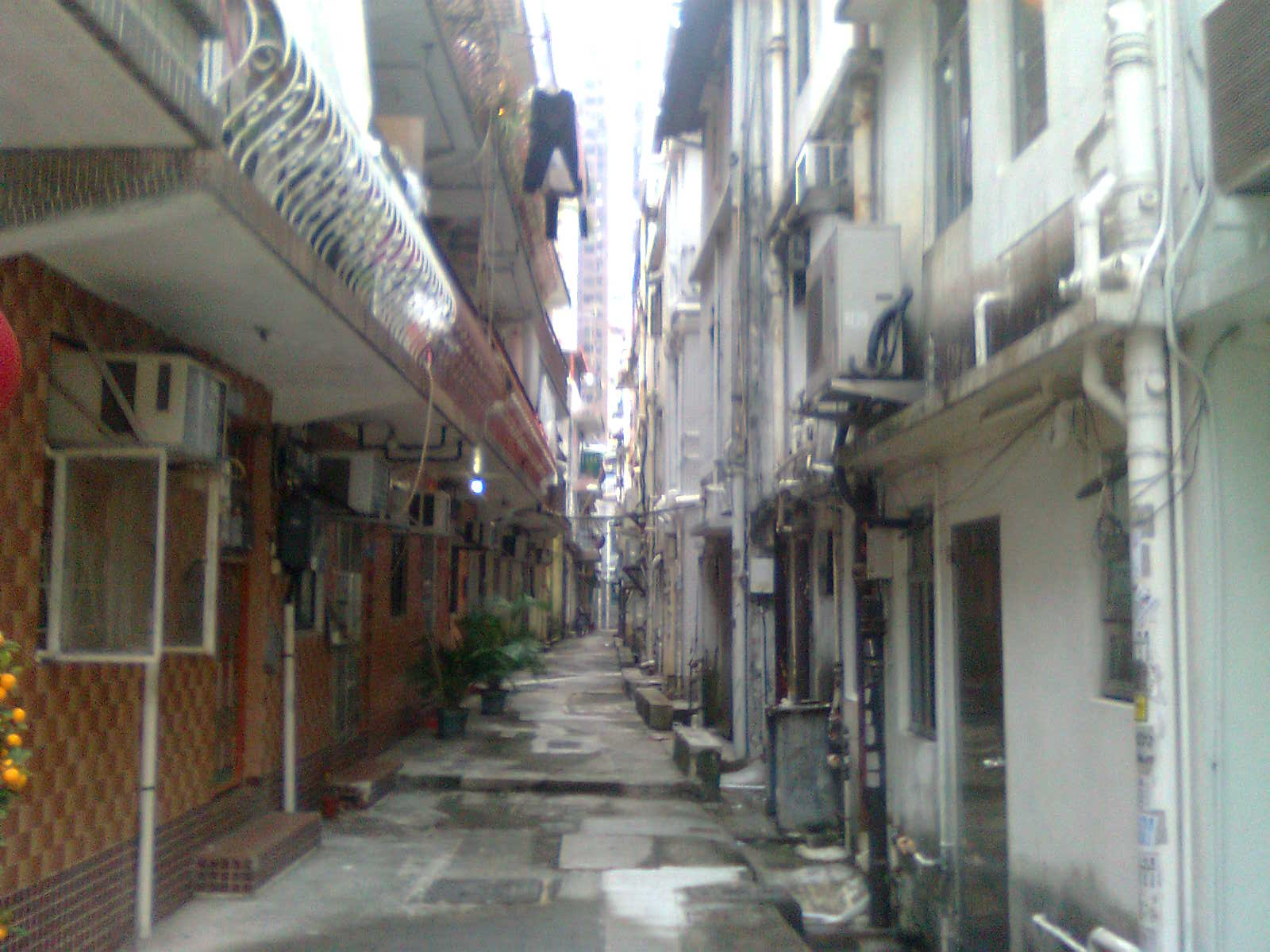
Lane in Ha Keng Hau.

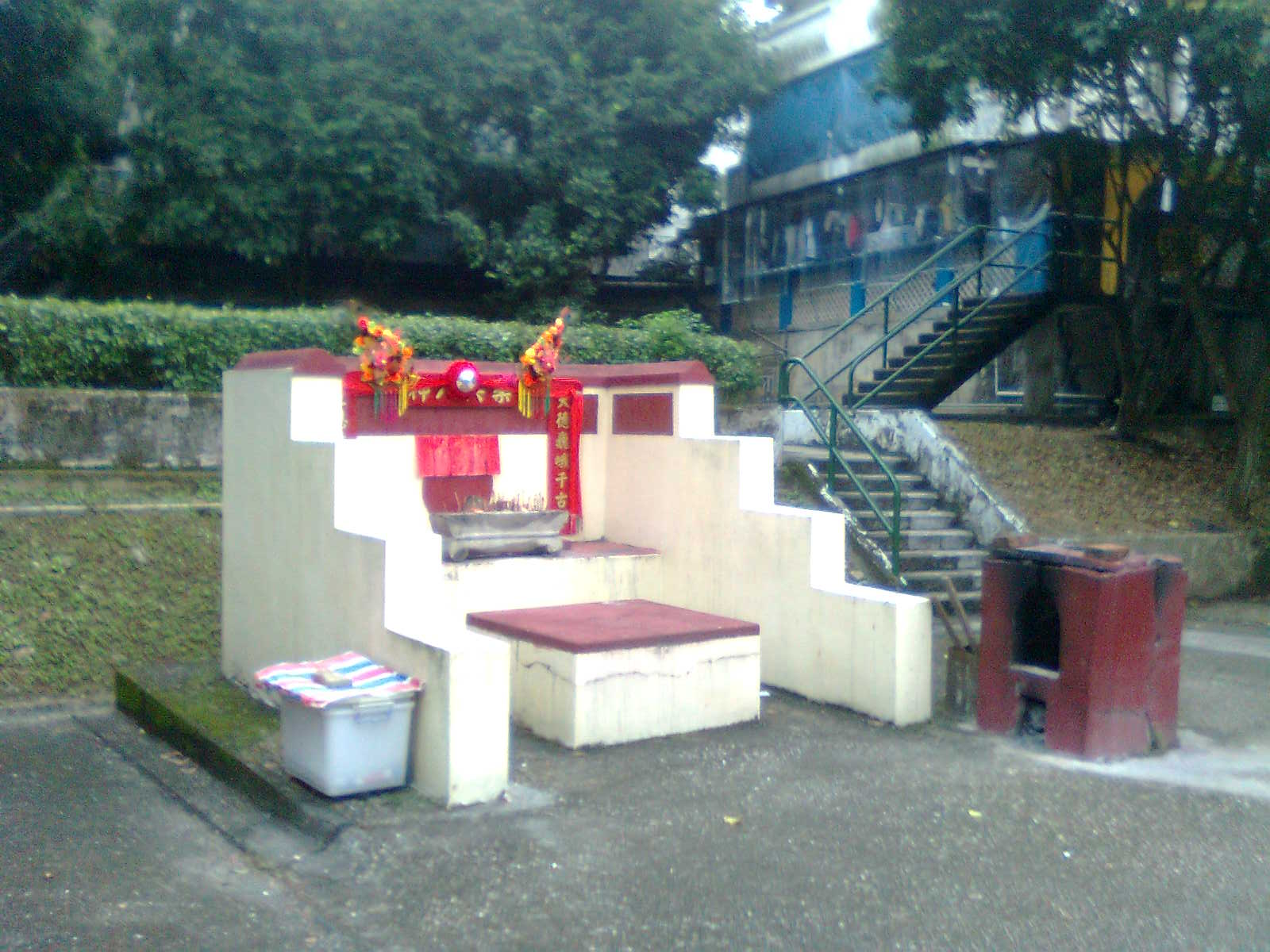
Shrine in Ha Keng Hau.

Ha Keng Hau (Chinese: 下徑口; lit. 'Lower Keng Hau') is a village in the Tai Wai area of Sha Tin District, Hong Kong.

== Administration ==
Ha Keng Hau is a recognized village under the New Territories Small House Policy.

== Location ==
Ha Keng Hau, Sheung Keng Hau (上徑口; 'Upper Keng Hau') and Hin Tin are three adjacent villages located along Hin Keng Street (顯徑街), along a northeast–southwest direction. Hin Keng Estate, located northeast of the villages and across Hin Keng Street, was named after them. Ha Keng Hau is located east of Hin Keng Estate and west of Lung Hang Estate.

== History ==
Ha Keng Hau was established by the Law (羅) and the Mak (麥) during the 18th century. The Mak who settled there had branched out of Pan Chung (泮涌) in Tai Po.

At the time of the 1911 census, the population of Keng Hau was 195. The number of males was 86.

== See also ==
- Hin Keng station
- Kau Yeuk (Sha Tin)
- Keng Hau (constituency)
