= Lung Hang Estate =

Public housing estate in Tai Wai, Hong Kong

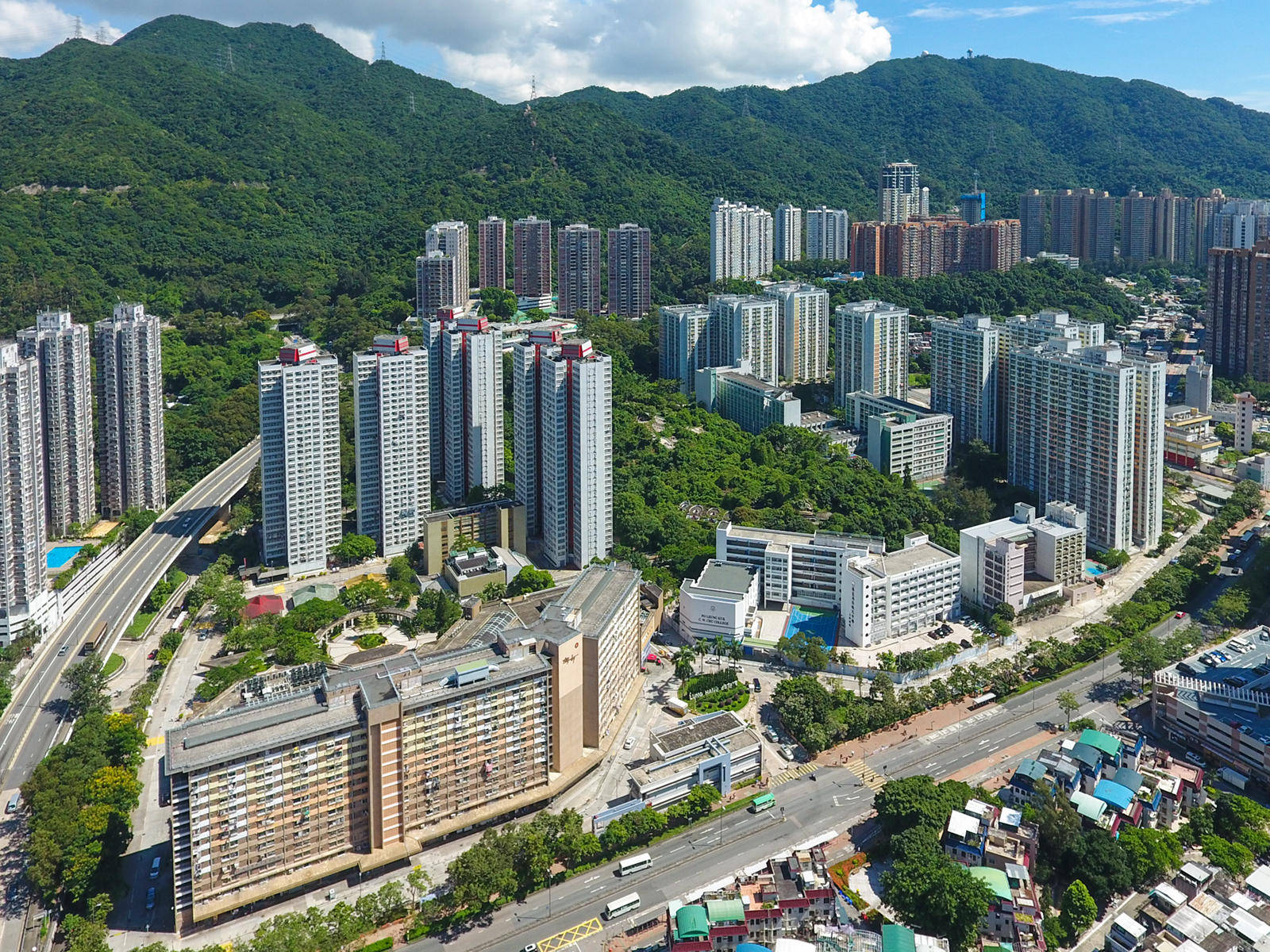
- Lung Hang Estate
- Interactive map of Lung Hang Estate

General information
- Location: 1 Tin Sam Street, Tai Wai; New Territories, Hong Kong
- Coordinates: 22.36642°N 114.17727°E
- Status: Completed
- Category: Public rental housing
- Population: 13,306 (2016)
- No. of blocks: 6
- No. of units: 4,376

Construction
- Constructed: 1983; 43 years ago
- Authority: Hong Kong Housing Authority

Lung Hang Estate (Chinese: 隆亨邨) is a public housing estate in Tai Wai, New Territories, Hong Kong. It is located between Hin Keng Estate and Sun Chui Estate, and consists of 6 residential blocks completed in 1983 and 1985 respectively.

King Tin Court (Chinese: 景田苑) is a Home Ownership Scheme court in Tai Wai, near Lung Hang Estate. It consists of six residential buildings built in 1983.

== Houses ==
=== Lung Hang Estate ===
Name	Chinese name	Building type	Completed
Wing Sam House	榮心樓	Old Slab	1985
Hok Sam House	學心樓	Double H	1983
Lok Sam House	樂心樓	Double H	1983
Sin Sam House	善心樓	Twin Tower	1983
Sheung Sam House	賞心樓	Twin Tower	1983
Wai Sam House	慧心樓	Twin Tower	1983

=== King Tin Court ===
Name	Chinese name	Building type	Completed
Man Sam House	文心閣	Flexi 2	1983
Ching Sam House	正心閣	Flexi 2	1983
Bing Sam House	冰心閣	Flexi 2	1983
Hung Sam House	雄心閣	Flexi 2	1983
Hang Sam House	恒心閣	Flexi 2	1983
King Sam House	敬心閣	Flexi 2	1983

== Demographics ==
According to the 2016 by-census, Lung Hang Estate had a population of 13,306 while King Tin Court had a population of 3,559. Altogether the population amounts to 16,865.

== Politics ==
For the 2019 District Council election, the estate fell within two constituencies. Lung Hang Estate is located in the Tin Sum constituency, which was formerly represented by Tsang Kit until July 2021, while King Tin Court falls within the Chui Tin constituency, which was formerly represented by Rick Hui Yui-yu until July 2021.

== See also ==
- Public housing estates in Tai Wai
