= Union Hospital (Hong Kong) =

- Henderson Land

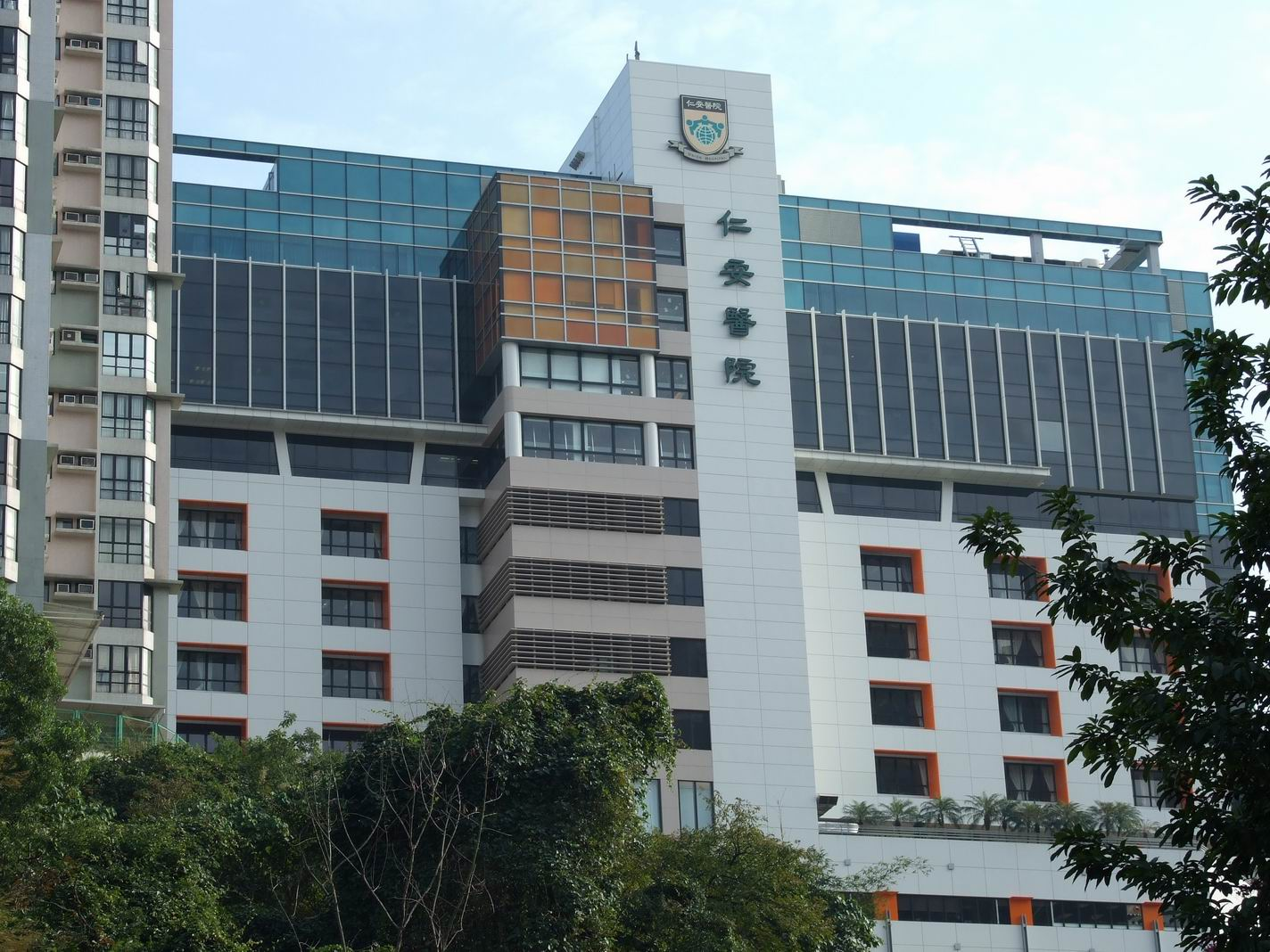
- Union Hospital

- Location within Hong Kong

Geography
- Location: 18 Fu Kin Street, Tai Wai, New Territories, Hong Kong
- Coordinates: 22°21′37″N 114°10′31″E

Organisation
- Care system: Private
- Type: District General

Services
- Emergency department: Yes, Accident and Emergency
- Beds: 410

History
- Founded: 22 June 1994; 32 years ago

Links
- Website: www.union.org
- Lists: Hospitals in Hong Kong

Union Hospital (Chinese: 仁安醫院; UH) is a for profit hospital in Tai Wai, Sha Tin, New Territories, Hong Kong. It was established on 22 June 1994 and was developed by the Henderson Land Development Co. Ltd. It is the first private general hospital in the New Territories East part of the Hong Kong SAR.

== History ==
The project for the building of the hospital was divided into two phases. Phase one included a multi-storey main hospital building with four ward floors (which accommodate 200 beds), a three-storey Medical Centre, a 24-storey staff quarters as well as an underground car park with more than 170 spaces. A total gross floor area of 27,756 m^{2} has been constructed and over HK$400 million have already been expended.

The phase two hospital extension project was completed in 2006, with the construction costs exceeding HK$210 million. By constructing four new floors atop the existing building, an extra 107 beds and more new facilities have been provided to cope with the growing demand for hospital services. The additions include the Minimally Invasive Centre, Day Therapy Centre, Surgical Ward, and the 5-star-hotel-like Private Ward.

The Union Hospital is surveyed and accredited by QHA Trent Accreditation of the United Kingdom, a major international healthcare accreditation group.

As of 2008, staff of the hospital are presenting internationally on the subject of medical tourism.

== Transport links ==
- Free shuttle bus to and from Tai Wai MTR station
- Green minibus: 63S, 68K, 68S, 803, 804, and 812
- Bus: 46S, 46X, 80, 80A, 80P, 81S, 82K, 85B, 87B, 88K, 281M, 286X, 985, 985B, and N281

== See also ==
- List of hospitals in Hong Kong
- Trent Accreditation Scheme
