= Sheung Keng Hau =

Village in Hong Kong

Coordinates: 22.363997°N 114.174436°E

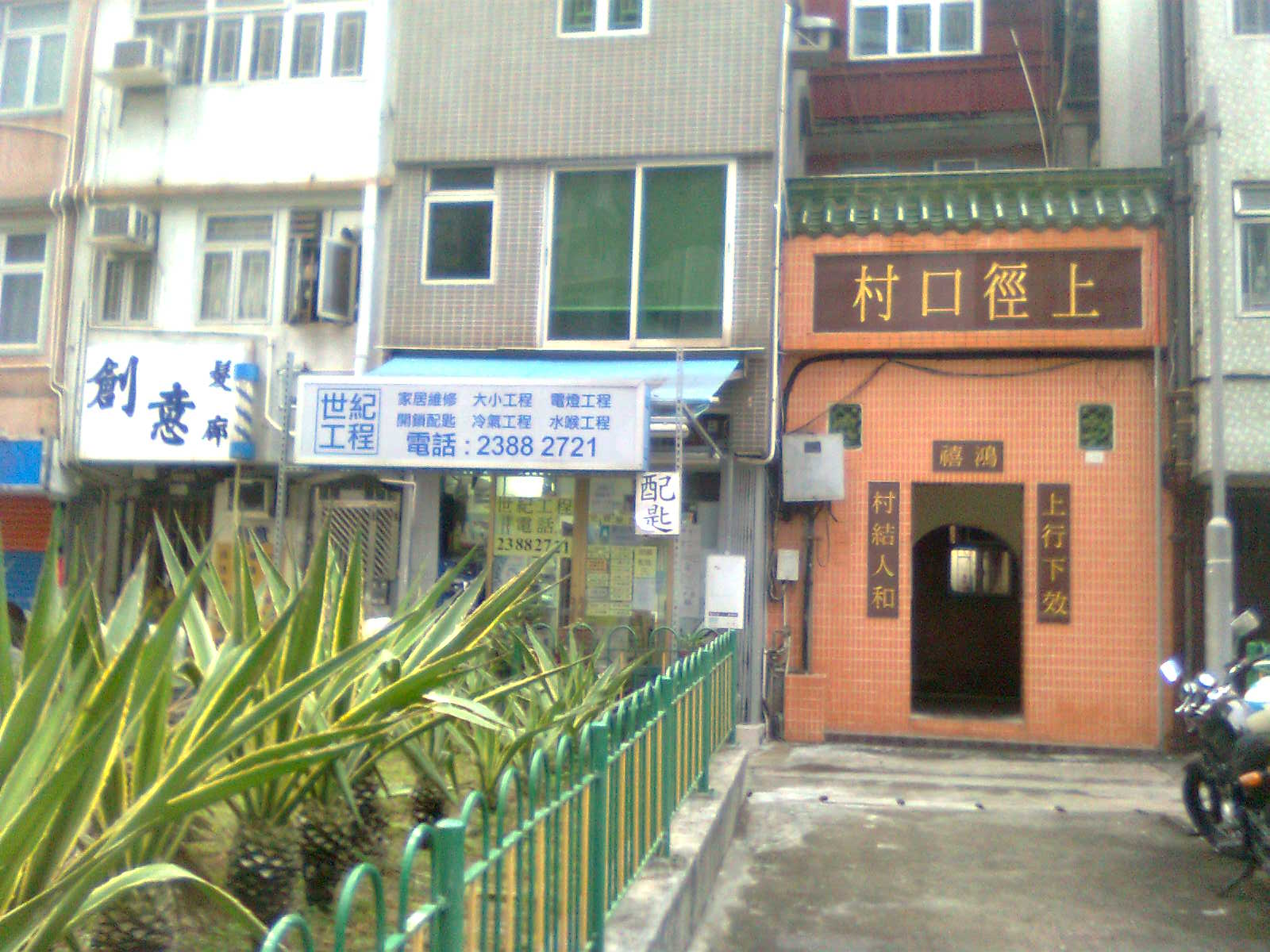
Entrance gate of Sheung Keng Hau along Hin Keng Street.

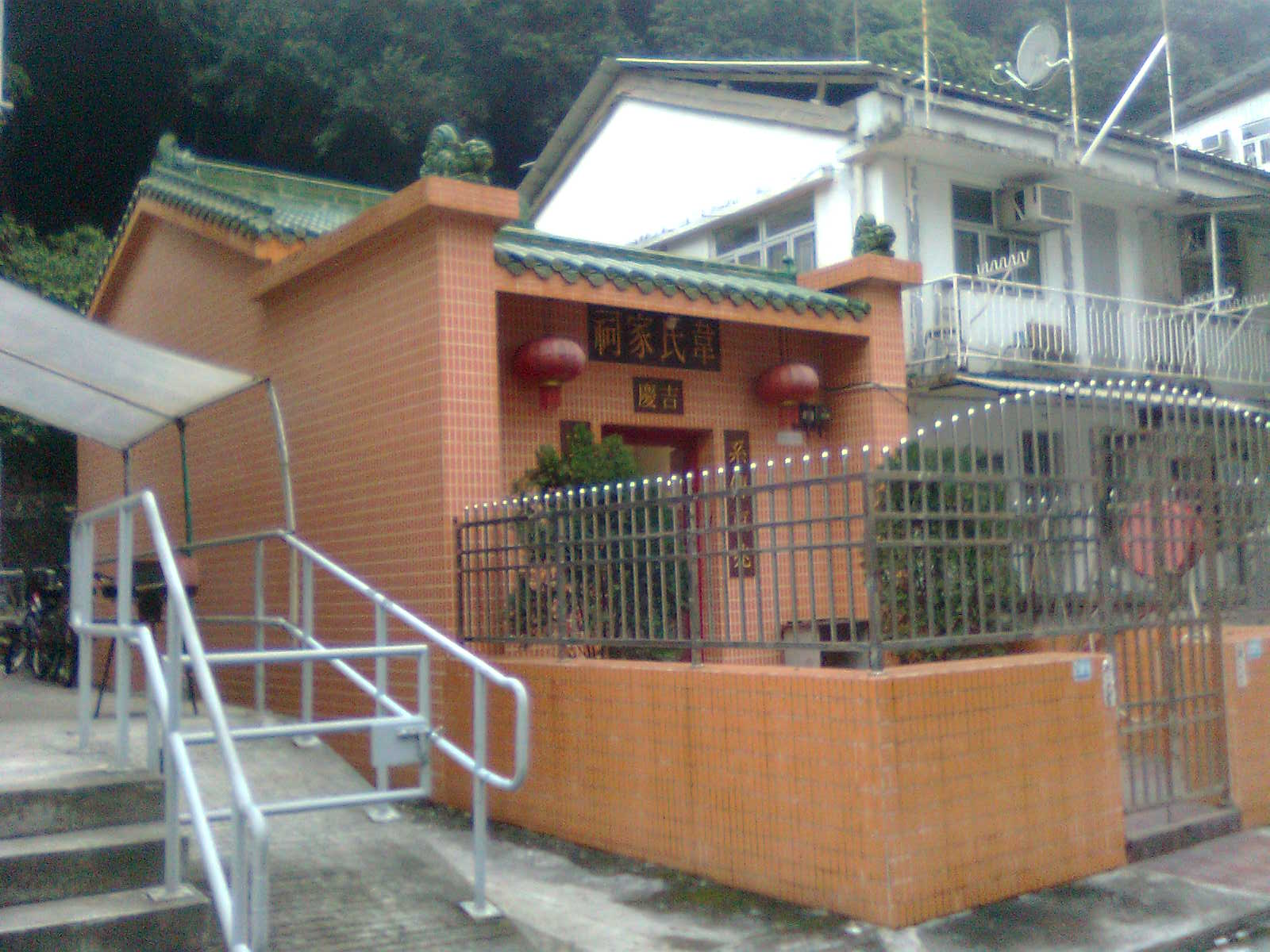
Wai Ancestral Hall in Sheung Keng Hau.

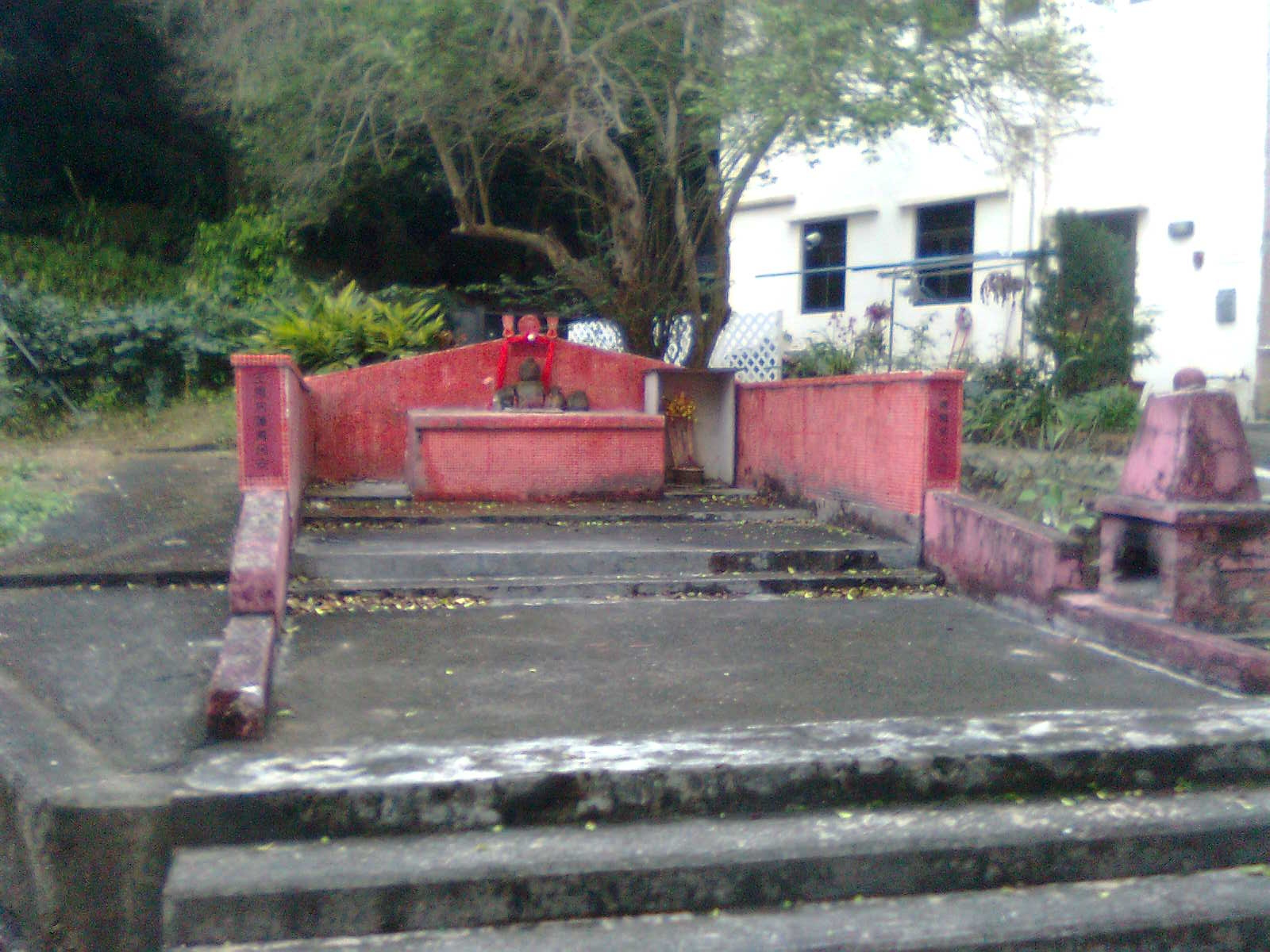
Shrine in Sheung Keng Hau.

Sheung Keng Hau (Chinese: 上徑口; lit. 'Upper Keng Hau') is a village in the Tai Wai area of Sha Tin District, Hong Kong.

== Location ==
Ha Keng Hau (下徑口; 'Lower Keng Hau'), Sheung Keng Hau and Hin Tin are three adjacent villages located along Hin Keng Street (顯徑街), along a northeast–southwest direction. Hin Keng Estate, located northeast of the villages and across Hin Keng Street, was named after them. Sheung Keng Hau is located southeast of Hin Keng Estate.

== Administration ==
Sheung Keng Hau is a recognized village under the New Territories Small House Policy.

== History ==
Sheung Keng Hau is a single-surname village, Wai (韋), with a history of over 300 years. The Wai Ancestral Hall was rebuilt in 1930.

At the time of the 1911 census, the population of Keng Hau was 195. The number of males was 86.

== See also ==
- Hin Keng station
- Kau Yeuk (Sha Tin)
- Keng Hau (constituency)
