= Wéi =

Common family name in China

- Romanisation: Wai (Cantonese)

Origin
- Origin: Multiple
- Meaning: "Leather"
- Region of origin: Henan (original); Guangxi

Other names
- Related names: Hán 韓/韩

Wéi (simplified Chinese: 韦; traditional Chinese: 韋) is a Chinese surname. It means ‘leather’ in Classical Chinese. It was the 62nd most common name in China as of 2018. It is Wai in Cantonese. It is the 50th name on the Hundred Family Surnames poem.

The Wei (韋) family name is derived from the surnames Peng (彭) and Xiong (熊) from the ancient state of Chu. During the Han dynasty, Han Xin's son escaped to Wei Country (韋) because of the purge of Empress Lü Zhi, and later took the surname Wei (韋) from the region's name. A 2013 study by the Fuxi Cultural Association found it to be the 66th most common name, shared by 4.3 million people or 0.320% of the population, with the province with the most being Guangxi.

== Possible origins ==
- from Shi Wei (豕韋), the name of a state in modern Henan province, originally granted to Yuan Zhe by the Emperor Shao Kang in the Xia dynasty
- from Wei (韋) as a title of an official in charge of the manufacture of leather goods
- from the Wei (韋) family in the ancient state of Shu Le in present-day Xinjiang during the Western Han dynasty
- allegedly borne by descendants of Han Xin, an official in the early Western Han dynasty who was killed on the orders of Empress Lü. His descendants fled to the area of present-day Guangdong and Guangxi, and in order to avoid persecution they simplified their surname Han (韓) to Wei (韋) by removing the left radical,
- descendants of Huan Yanfan (桓彥範), who was given the surname by the emperor Emperor Zhongzong of Tang as a token of appreciation

== Notable people ==
- Empress Wei (韋皇后/韦皇后), second wife of Emperor Zhongzong of the Tang dynasty
- Wei Dongyi (韦东奕), Chinese mathematician
- Wei Guoqing (韦国清), ethnic Zhuang PLA General and politician
- Wei Kang (韋康; died 213), courtesy name Yuanjiang, was an official who lived in the late Eastern Han dynasty of China.
- William Wei Li-an (韋禮安), Taiwanese Mandopop and folk-rock singer-songwriter
- Wei Lijie (韦利杰), Chinese Antarctic researcher
- Wei Shihao (韦世豪), Chinese footballer
- Wei Wei (韦唯), Chinese singer
- Wei Yi (韦奕), chess player
- Wei Yongli (韦永丽), Chinese sprinter
- Au Yeong Wai Yhann, Singaporean squash player
- Wei Gui (韦珪/韋珪), Noble Consort of Emperor Taizong of the Tang Dynasty
