= Shatin Tsung Tsin Secondary School =

Secondary school in Hong Kong

Coordinates: 22.370294°N 114.174876°E

Location
- 1 Mei Tin Road, Tai Wai, Sha Tin District, Hong Kong

Information
- Type: Aided
- Motto: "Fides, Spes and Caritas" is in Latin which means "Faith, Hope and Love" in English. ("And now these three remain: faith, hope and love. But the greatest of these is love." (1 Corinthians 13:13))
- Established: 1985; 41 years ago
- School district: Sha Tin District
- Principal: Ms. Leung Kit Yin
- Gender: Co-education
- Enrollment: 1,088 (2013-2014)
- Language: English
- Campus size: 6,600 m^{2} (71,000 sq ft) (approx.)
- Affiliation: Tsung Tsin Mission of Hong Kong
- Website: sttss.edu.hk

Shatin Tsung Tsin Secondary School
- Traditional Chinese: 沙田崇真中學
- Simplified Chinese: 沙田崇真中学
Transcriptions
Standard Mandarin
- Hanyu Pinyin: Shātián Chóng Zhēn Zhōngxué
Yue: Cantonese
- Jyutping: saa1 tin4 sung4 zan1 zung1 hok6

Shatin Tsung Tsin Secondary School (Chinese: 沙田崇真中學) is a grammar school in Tai Wai, Sha Tin District, Hong Kong. Founded in 1985 by the Basel Mission (Sham Shui Po).

== Curriculum ==
=== Subjects for Junior Secondary (S1-S3) ===
S1: Chinese, English, English Literature, Mathematics, Integrated Science, Chinese History, World History, Geography, Liberal Studies, Technology, Putonghua, Arts-in-Life (visual arts, domestic science, music), Physical Education, Life Education and Christian Education.

S2: Chinese, English, English Literature, Mathematics, Physics, Chemistry, Biology, Chinese History, World History, Geography, Liberal Studies, Technology, Putonghua, Arts-in-Life(visual arts, domestic science, music), Physical Education, Life Education and Christian Education.

S3: Chinese, English, English Literature, Mathematics, Physics, Chemistry, Biology, Chinese History, World History, Geography, Liberal Studies, Economics, Business, Accounting and Financial Studies(BAFS), Technology, Putonghua, Arts-in-Life(visual arts, music), Physical Education, Life Education and Christian Education.

=== Subjects for New Senior Secondary (S4-S6) ===
Core subjects: Chinese, English, Mathematics, Liberal Studies

Elective subjects: Physics, Chemistry, Biology, Information and Communication Technology, World History, Chinese History, Chinese Literature, Economics, Business, Accounting and Financial Studies(BAFS), Physical Education, Geography and Visual Arts (For S5-S6, the school offers Mathematics Extended Module 1 and 2 for capable students.)
