= Keng Hau (constituency) =

Hong Kong constituency

- Elected constituency for the Sha Tin District Council
- Boundary of Keng Hau in Sha Tin District
- District: Sha Tin
- Legislative Council constituency: New Territories North East
- Population: 19,588 (2019)
- Electorate: 13,023 (2019)

Current constituency
- Created: 1994
- Number of members: One
- Member: Vacant

Keng Hau is one of the 41 constituencies in the Sha Tin District in Hong Kong.

The constituency returns one district councillor to the Sha Tin District Council, with an election every four years.

Keng Hau constituency is loosely based on part of the public estates Hin Yiu Estate and Hin Keng Estate, villages Ha Keng Hau, Sheung Keng Hau, and private housing estates Parc Royale and Julimount Garden, with an estimated population of 19,588.

== Councillors represented ==
Election	Member	Party
1994	Wai Kwok-hung	Civil Force
1999	Wai Kwok-hung	Civil Force
2003	Wai Kwok-hung	Civil Force
2007	Wai Kwok-hung	Civil Force
2011	Ng Kam-hung→Vacant	Democratic
2015	Ng Kam-hung→Vacant	Democratic→Community Sha Tin
2019	Ng Kam-hung→Vacant	Community Sha Tin→Independent

== Election results ==
=== 2010s ===
Sha Tin District Council Election, 2019: Keng Hau
Party	Candidate	Votes	%	±%
Nonpartisan	Ng Kam-hung	5,453	60.11	+3.21
NPP (Civil Force)	Cheung Pak-yuen	3,443	37.95	−5.15
Independent	Lok Chung-yau	176	1.94	
Majority		2,010	22.16	
Turnout		9,101	69.91	
Nonpartisan hold		Swing		

Sha Tin District Council Election, 2015: Keng Hau
Party	Candidate	Votes	%	±%
Democratic	Ng Kam-hung	2,826	56.9	+6.7
NPP (Civil Force)	George Ho Kwok-wah	2,144	43.1	−6.7
Majority		685	13.8	+10.8
Turnout		4,970	41.7	+9.7
Democratic hold		Swing	+6.7	

Sha Tin District Council Election, 2011: Keng Hau
Party	Candidate	Votes	%	±%
Democratic	Daniel Ng Kam-hung	1,873	50.2	
Civil Force	Wong Ka-sek	1,855	49.8	−21.5
Majority		18	0.4	−42.2
Turnout		3,728	32.0	
Democratic gain from Civil Force		Swing		

=== 2000s ===
Sha Tin District Council Election, 2007: Keng Hau
Party	Candidate	Votes	%	±%
Civil Force	Wai Kwok-hung	2,058	71.3	−5.0
Independent	Leung Chung-ling	827	28.7	+5.0
Majority		1,231	42.6	−0.6
Civil Force hold		Swing		

Sha Tin District Council Election, 2003: Keng Hau
Party	Candidate	Votes	%	±%
Civil Force	Wai Kwok-hung	2,206	76.3	+4.7
Independent	Leung Chung-ling	685	23.7	
Majority		2,348	65.7	+44.7
Democratic hold		Swing		

=== 1990s ===
Sha Tin District Council Election, 1999: Keng Hau
Party	Candidate	Votes	%	±%
Civil Force	Wai Kwok-hung	2,210	71.6	+7.1
Frontier	Helen Yeung Yuk-kuen	876	28.4	
Majority		1,334	43.2	+14.2
Civil Force hold		Swing		

Sha Tin District Board Election, 1994: Keng Hau
Party	Candidate	Votes	%	±%
Civil Force	Wai Kwok-hung	1,508	64.5	
Liberal	Kwong Kwan-ming	829	35.5	
Majority		679	29.0	
Civil Force win (new seat)				
