= Chui Tin (constituency) =

Constituency in the Sha Tin District, Hong Kong

- Elected constituency for the Sha Tin District Council
- Boundary of Chui Tin in Sha Tin District
- District: Sha Tin
- Legislative Council constituency: New Territories North East
- Population: 15,025 (2019)
- Electorate: 9,597 (2019)

Current constituency
- Created: 1994
- Number of members: One
- Member: Vacant

Chui Tin
- Traditional Chinese: 翠田
Transcriptions
Yue: Cantonese
- Yale Romanization: Cheui tìhn
- Jyutping: Coei3 tin4

Chui Tin is one of the 41 constituencies of the Sha Tin District Council. The seat elects one member of the council every four years. The constituency has an estimated population of 15,025.

== Councillors represented ==
Election	Member	Party
1994	Philip Wong Chak-piu	Civil Force
2014	Philip Wong Chak-piu	NPP/CF
2015	Rick Hui Yui-yu→Vacant	Neo Democrats
2016	Rick Hui Yui-yu→Vacant	Independent democrat

== Election results ==
=== 2010s ===
Sha Tin District Council Election, 2019: Chui Tin
Party	Candidate	Votes	%	±%
Ind. democrat	Rick Hui Yui-yu	4,552	64.97	
Independent	Lam Yuk-wa	2,454	35.03	
Majority		2,098	29.94	
Turnout		7,198	72.25	
Ind. democrat hold		Swing		
