= Sha Tin Tau =

Village in Hong Kong

Coordinates: 22.37317°N 114.18917°E

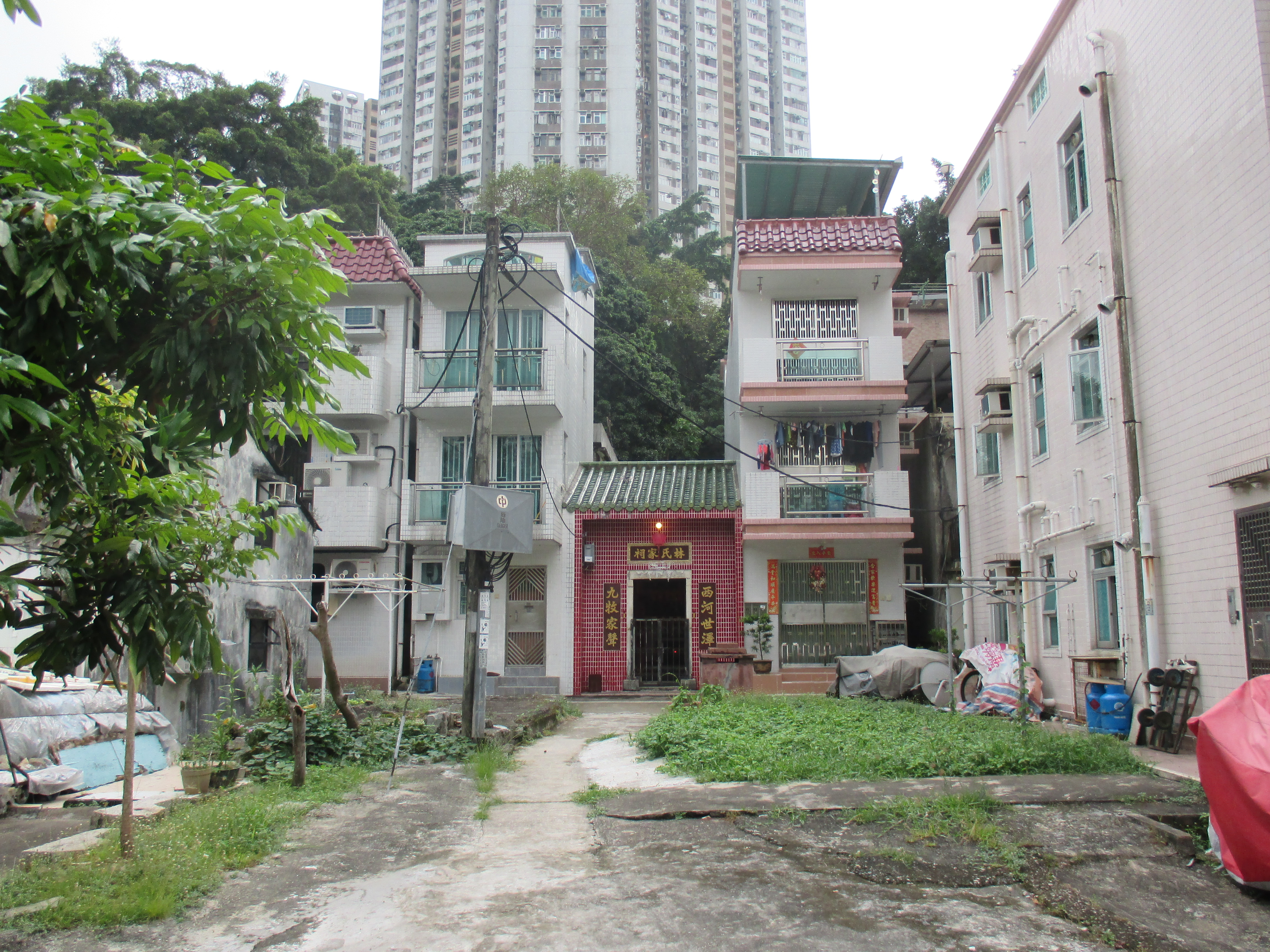
Lam Ancestral Hall in Sha Tin Tau.

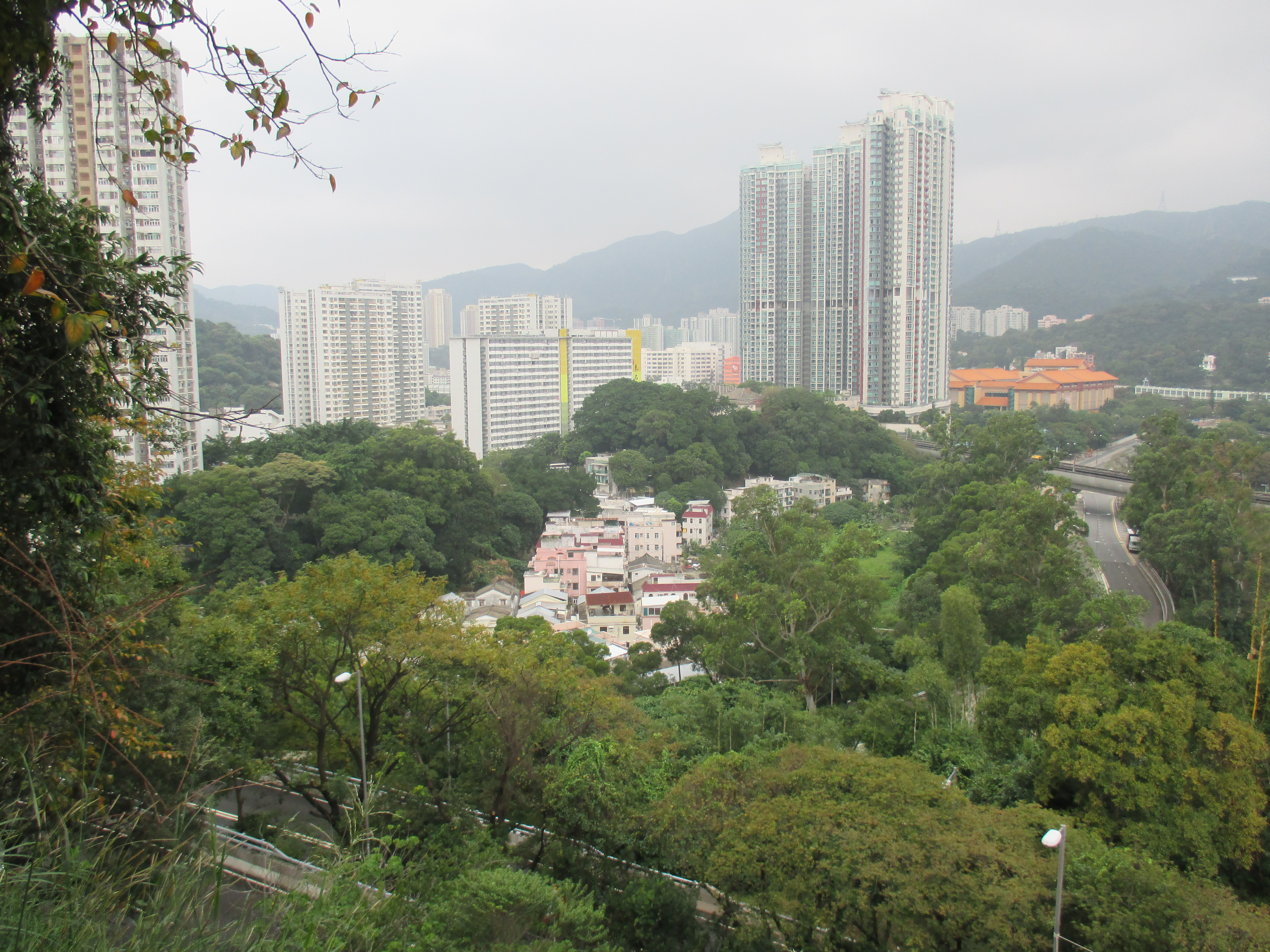
Overview of Sha Tin Tau.

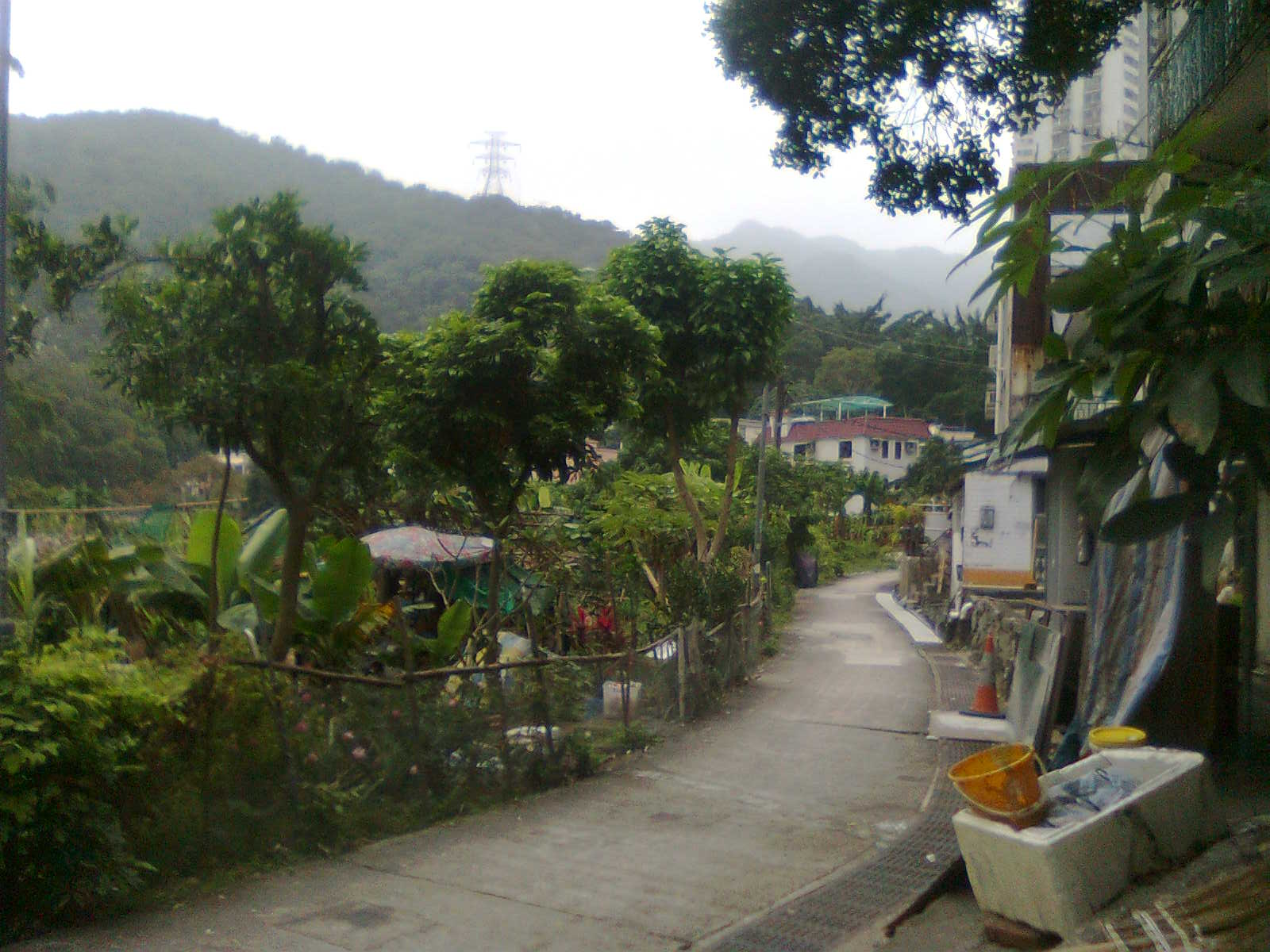
Access path to Sha Tin Tau.

Sha Tin Tau (Chinese: 沙田頭) is a village in Tai Wai, Sha Tin District, Hong Kong. It is located east of Chun Shek Estate, north of Fung Shing Court and south of Tsang Tai Uk.

== Administration ==
Sha Tin Tau is a recognized village under the New Territories Small House Policy.

== History ==
Historically the only Hakka multi-surname village in the Sha Tin area, it was first settled by the Chan (陳) and later by the Law (羅), the Lam (林), the Yip (葉), the Lau (劉) and others. There are several ancestral halls in the village, including the Lau Ancestral Hall (劉氏家祠), that was built before 1900. The founding ancestor of the Lau clan of Sha Tin Tau village moved from Longchuan in the mid-19th century. The clan has lived there for nine generations by the early 21st century.

== See also ==
- Lei Uk Tsuen (Sha Tin District)
