= Hin Keng =

Hin Keng may refer to:

- Hin Keng Estate, a public housing estate in Tai Wai, Hong Kong
- Hin Keng station, an MTR rapid transit station adjacent to the estate
