= Sun Tin Wai Estate =

Public housing estate in Tai Wai, Hong Kong

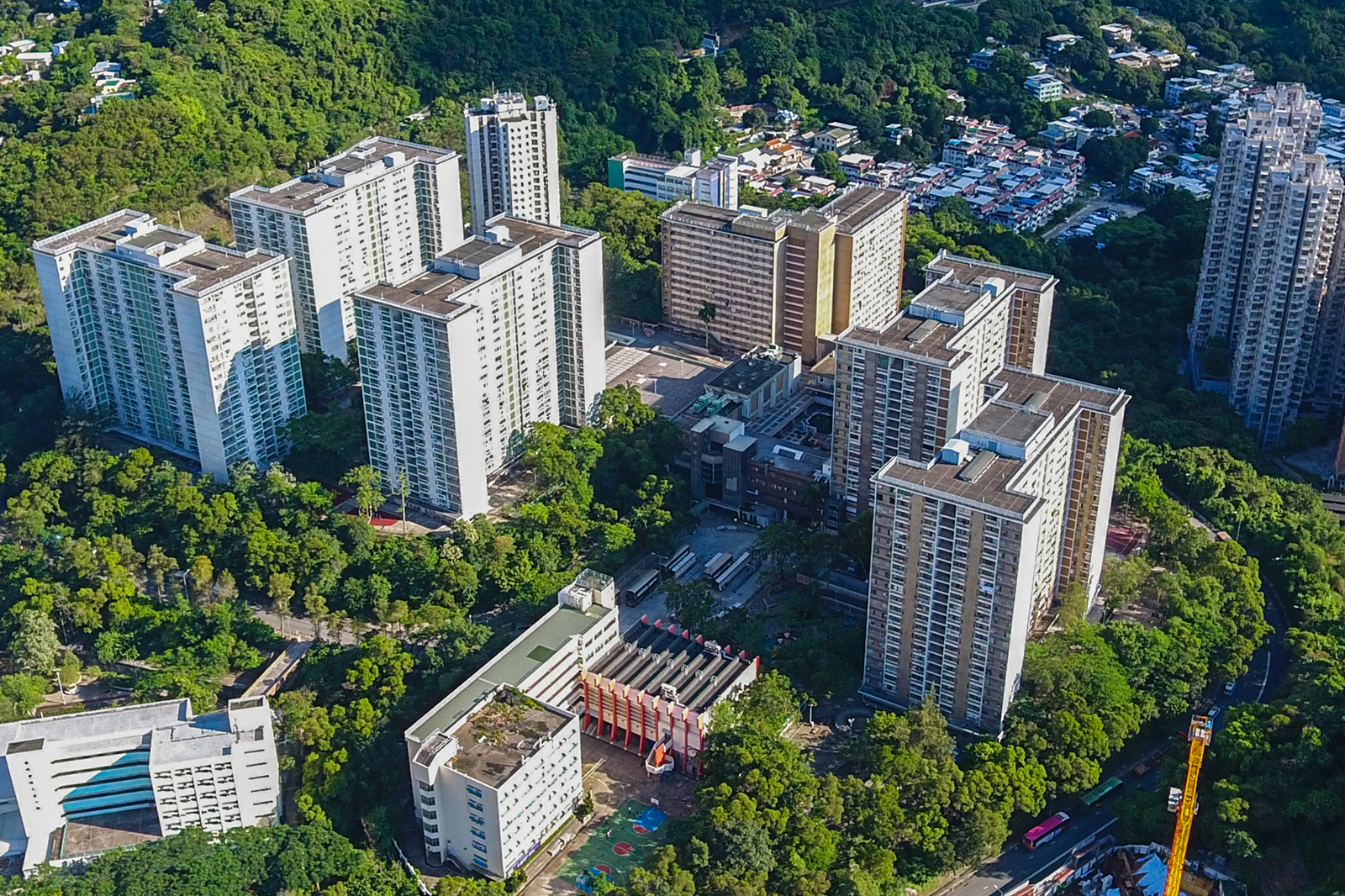
- Sun Tin Wai Estate
- Interactive map of Sun Tin Wai Estate

General information
- Location: 29 Sha Tin Tau Road, Tai Wai; New Territories, Hong Kong
- Coordinates: 22.370110°N 114.186500°E
- Status: Completed
- Category: Public rental housing
- Population: 8,826 (2016)
- No. of blocks: 8
- No. of units: 3,430

Construction
- Constructed: 1981; 45 years ago
- Authority: Hong Kong Housing Authority

Sun Tin Wai Estate (Chinese: 新田圍邨) is a public housing estate in Tai Wai, New Territories, Hong Kong. It was built on the hill at the south of Chun Shek Estate along Lion Rock Tunnel Road and consists of 8 residential blocks completed in 1981 and 1982.

Fung Shing Court (Chinese: 豐盛苑) is a Home Ownership Scheme court in Tai Wai, near Sun Tin Wai Estate. It consists of three residential buildings built in 1985.

== Houses ==
=== Sun Tin Wai Estate ===
Name	Chinese name	Building type	Completed
Yu Wai House	裕圍樓	Old Cruciform	1981
Fung Wai House	豐圍樓	Single I	1981
Shing Wai House	盛圍樓	Single I	1981
Foo Wai House	富圍樓	Single I	1981
Yan Wai House	欣圍樓	Single I	1982
Wing Wai House	榮圍樓	Single I	1982
Fook Wai House	福圍樓	Old Slab	1982
Hong Wai House	康圍樓	Old Slab	1982

=== Fung Shing Court ===
Name	Chinese name	Building type	Completed
Wing Shing House	榮盛閣	Trident 2	1985
Wah Shing House	華盛閣	Trident 2	1985
Fu Shing House	富盛閣	Trident 2	1985

== Demographics ==
According to the 2016 by-census, Sun Tin Wai Estate had a population of 8,826 while King Tin Court had a population of 5,940. Altogether the population amounts to 14,766.

== Politics ==
For the 2019 District Council election, the estate fell within two constituencies. Sun Tin Wai Estate is located in the Sun Tin Wai constituency, which was formerly represented by Ching Cheung-ying until July 2021, while Fung Shing Court falls within the Chun Fung constituency, which is currently represented by Chan Nok-hang.

== COVID-19 pandemic ==
Foo Wai House of the estate was placed under lockdown on 26 February, 2022.

== See also ==
- Public housing estates in Tai Wai
- San Tin Village
