= Hin Tin =

Village in Hong Kong

Coordinates: 22.362394°N 114.172475°E

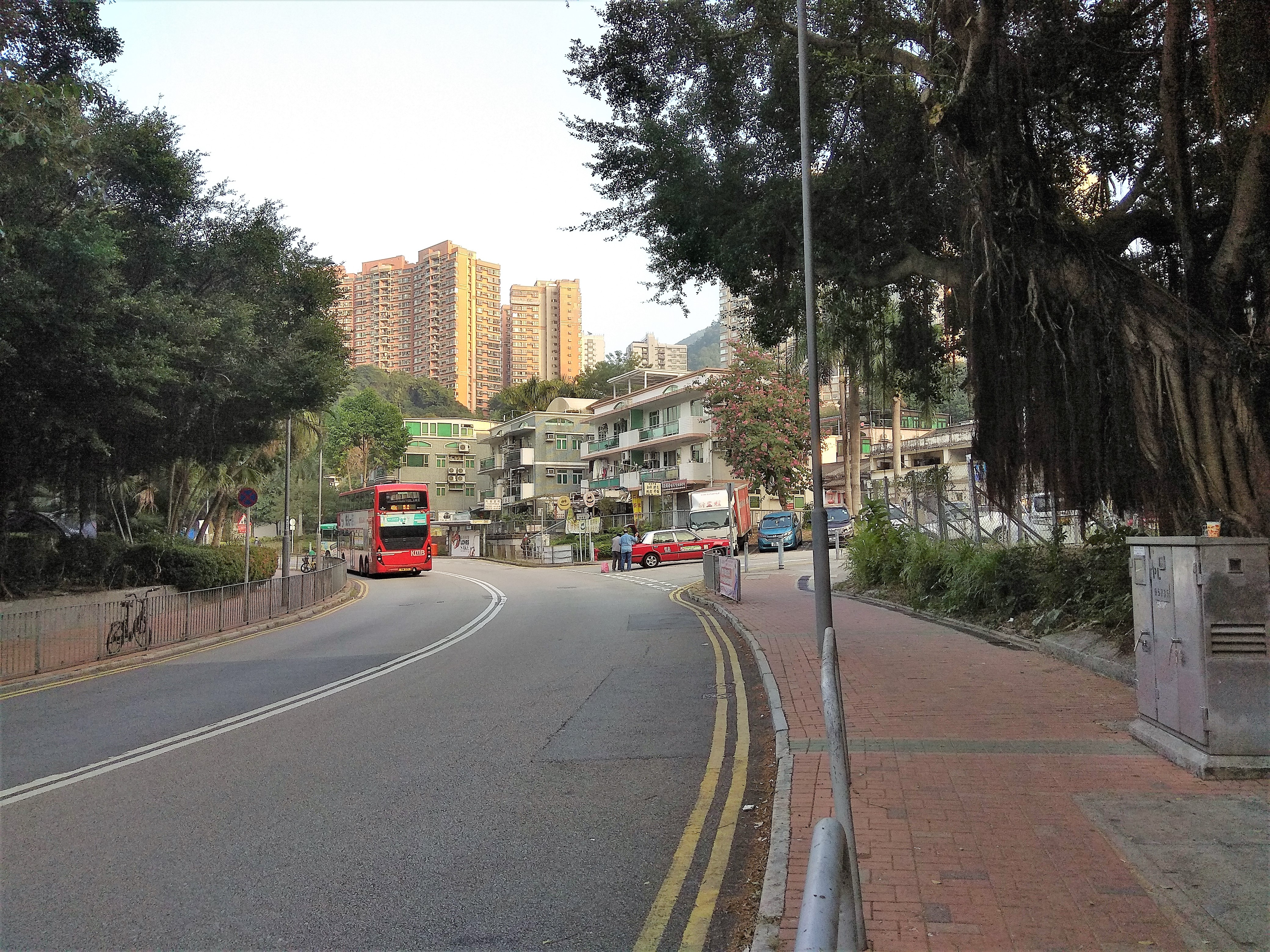
Village houses of Hin Tin along Hin Keng Street. The buildings in the background are part of the Parc Royale (聚龍居) private housing estate.

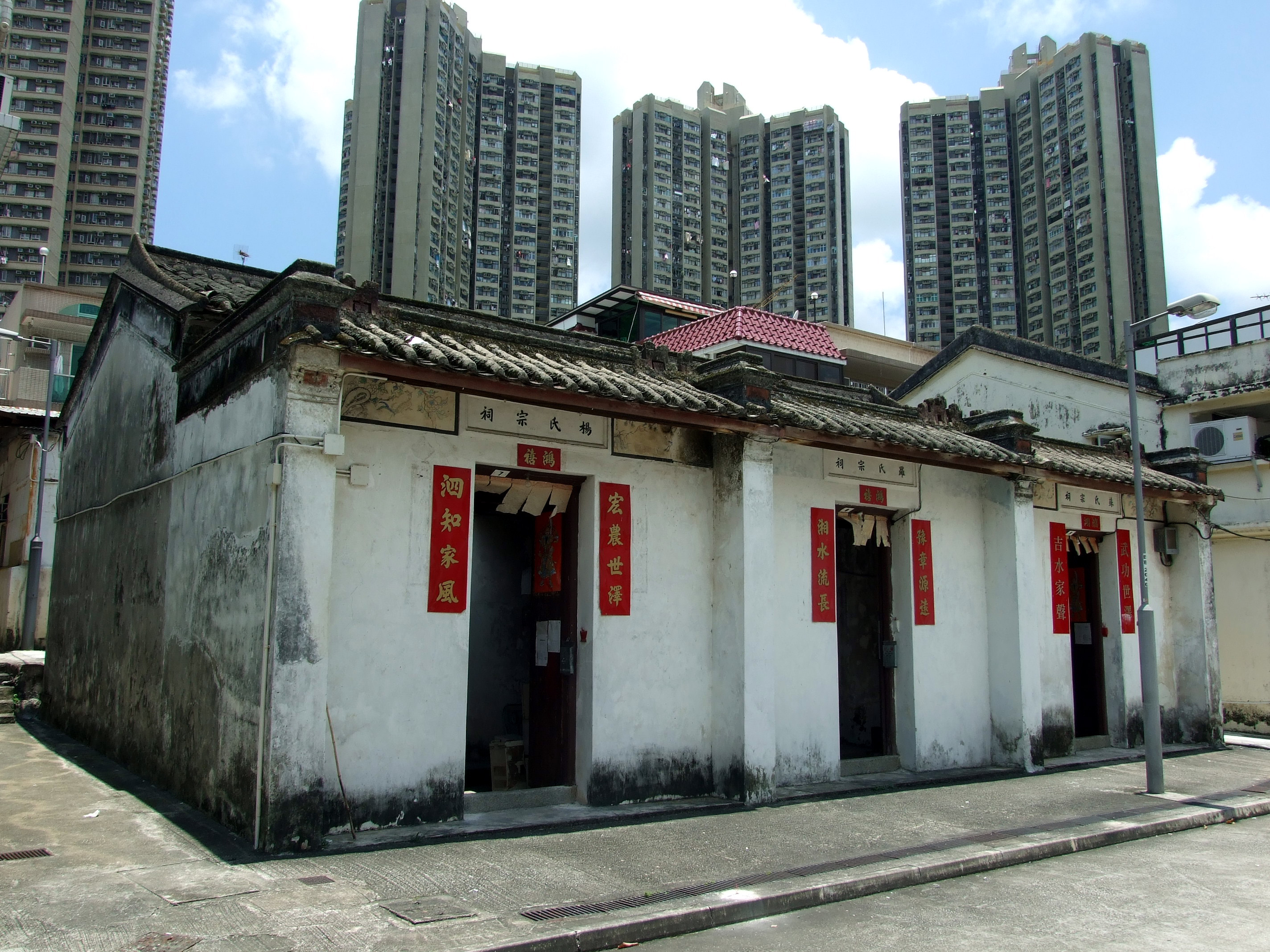
Yeung, Law, and So Ancestral Halls in Hin Tin. The towers in the background are part of Hin Keng Estate.

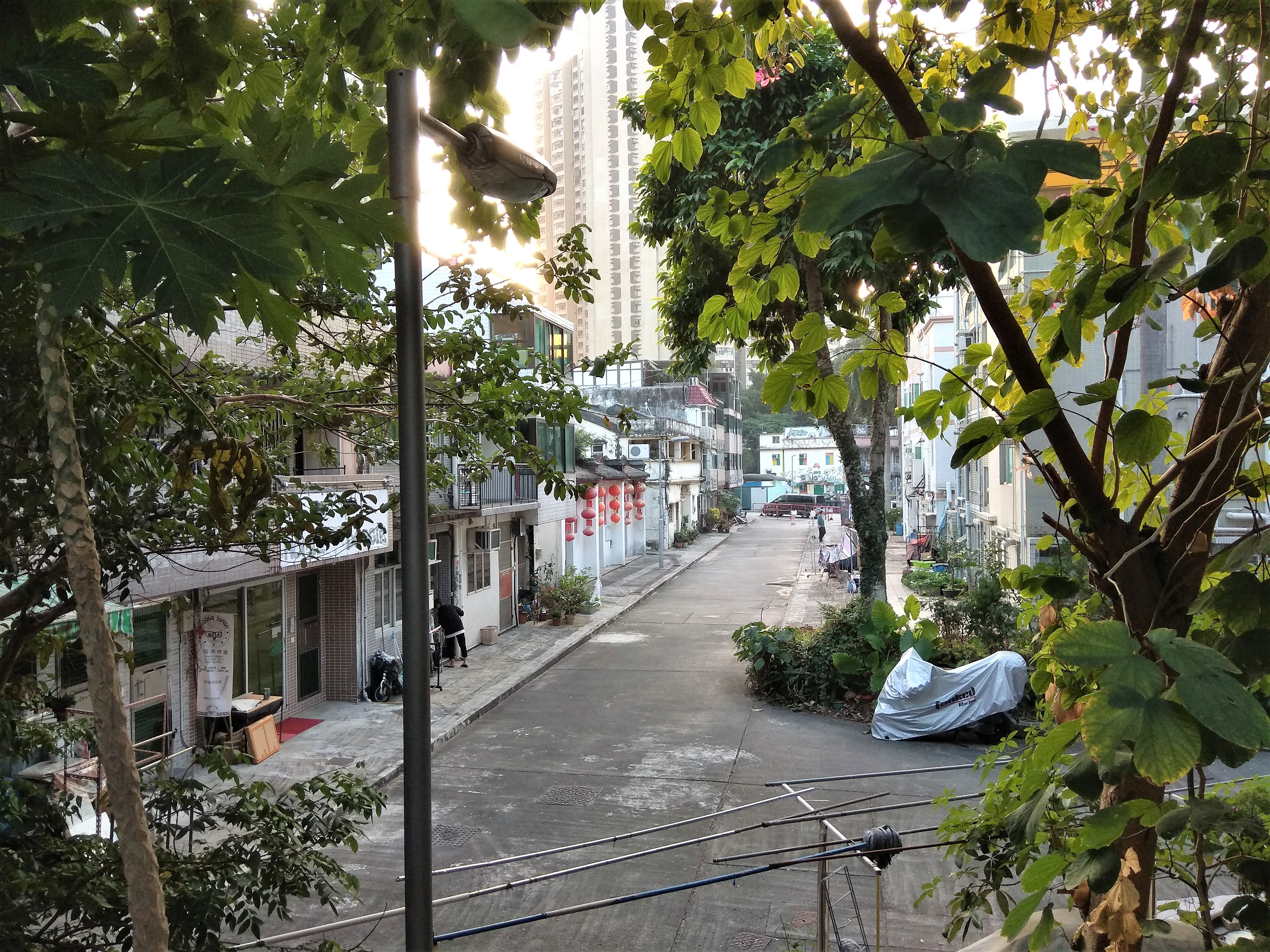
Hin Tin.

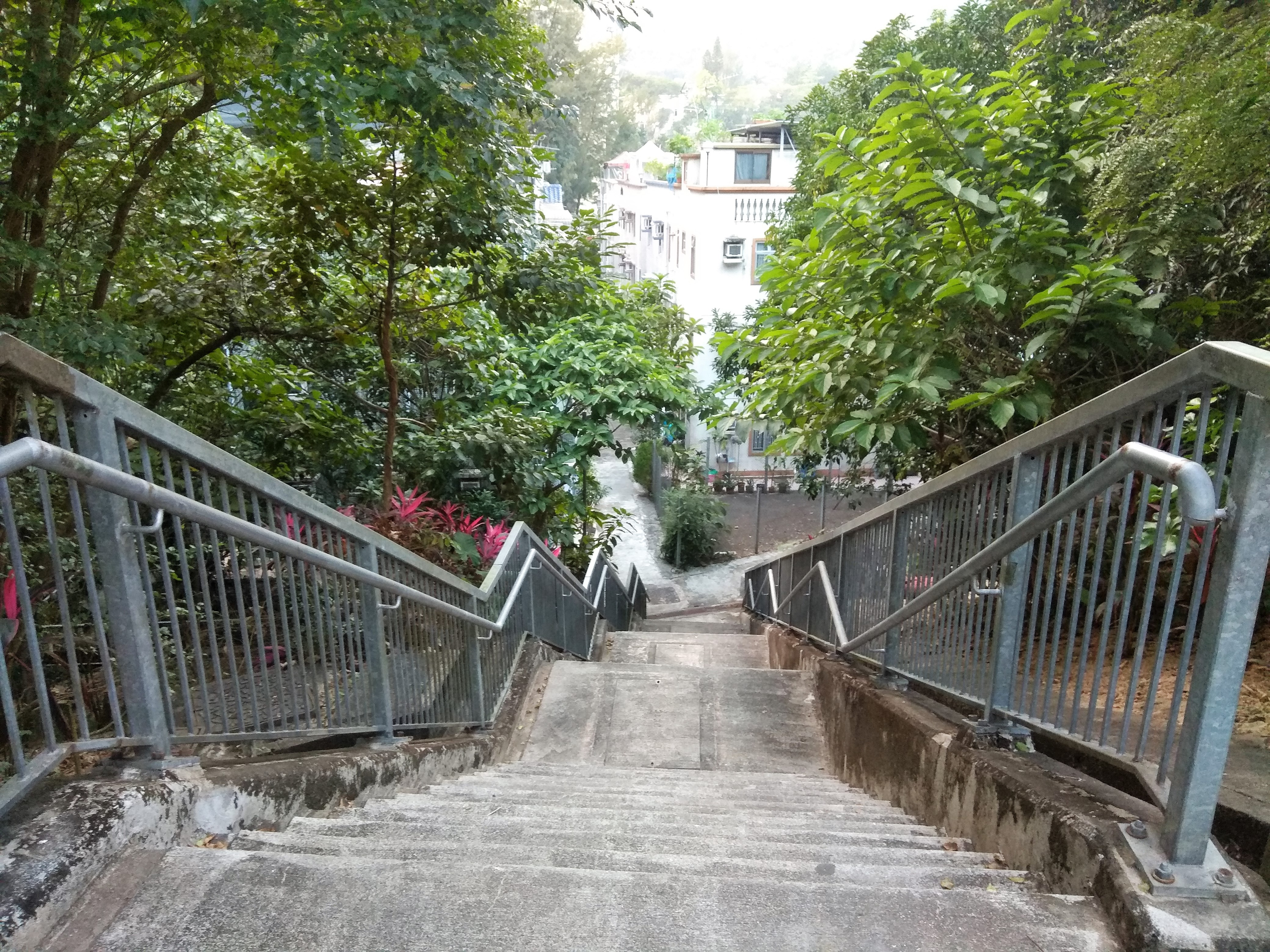
Stairs leading to the upper part of Hin Tin Village.

Hin Tin (Chinese: 顯田) is a village in the Tai Wai area of Sha Tin District, Hong Kong.

== Location ==
Hin Tin is located south of the main part of Hin Keng Estate, across Hin Keng Street (顯徑街). Ha Keng Hau, Sheung Keng Hau and Hin Tin are three adjacent villages located along Hin Keng Street in a northeast–southwest direction. Hin Keng Estate was named after these villages.

== Administration ==
Hin Tin is a recognized village under the New Territories Small House Policy.

== History ==
Hin Tin village was established with government funding in the 1920s to resettle three clans of villagers from Shek Lei Pui Valley (石梨貝谷), to make way for the construction of the Shek Lei Pui Reservoir, completed in 1925. Approximately 80 people lived in 26 houses in the former Shek Lei Pui Village. The Yeung (楊), the Law (羅) and the So (蘇) clans were Hakkas from Nantou who had settled in the Valley for some 300 years. Another clan in the Valley, the Lau (劉), relocated to Kwai Chung instead of Hin Tin during the resettlement. The villagers who chose to settle in Hin Tin did so because they saw good income opportunities from the surrounding forest at that time.

In 1982, the Housing Department demolished 600 structures at Hin Tin and relocated 167 families.

== Features ==
The ancestral halls of the three clans, Yeung (楊), Law (羅) and So (蘇), are connected together to form a single block on the front row of the original three rows of houses. They have been listed as Grade III historic buildings since 2010.

== See also ==
- Helen Liang Memorial Secondary School (Shatin)
- Hin Keng station
- Kau Yeuk (Sha Tin)
