= Sun Tin Wai (constituency) =

Hong Kong constituency

- Elected constituency for the Sha Tin District Council
- Boundary of Sun Tin Wai in Sha Tin District
- District: Sha Tin
- Legislative Council constituency: New Territories North East
- Population: 16,041 (2019)
- Electorate: 9,916 (2019)

Current constituency
- Created: 1994
- Number of members: One
- Member: Vacant

Sun Tin Wai is one of the 41 constituencies in the Sha Tin District in Hong Kong.

The constituency returns one district councillor to the Sha Tin District Council, with an election every four years.

Sun Tin Wai constituency is loosely based on part of the Lee Uk Village, San Tin Village, Golden Lion Garden and Sun Tin Wai Estate with an estimated population of 17,028.

== Councillors represented ==
Election	Member	Party
1994	Ching Cheung-ying→Vacant (Note: Resigned on 7 July 2021.)	Democratic

== Election results ==
=== 2010s ===
Sha Tin District Council Election, 2019: Sun Tin Wai
Party	Candidate	Votes	%	±%
Democratic	Ching Cheung-ying	4,212	60.61	−1.69
FTU	Ho Wai-chun	2,737	39.39	
Majority		1,475	21.22	
Turnout		6,994	70.59	
Democratic hold		Swing		

Sha Tin District Council Election, 2015: Sun Tin Wai
Party	Candidate	Votes	%	±%
Democratic	Ching Cheung-ying	2,455	62.3	−1.6
FTU	Li Lok-yan	1,488	37.7	
Majority		967	24.6	
Turnout		3,943	45.2	−5.2
Democratic hold		Swing		

Sha Tin District Council Election, 2011: Sun Tin Wai
Party	Candidate	Votes	%	±%
Democratic	Ching Cheung-ying	2,317	63.9	−3.7
Civil Force	Philip Wong Chak-piu	1,309	36.1	+3.7
Majority		1,008	26.8	−8.4
Turnout		3,626	39.6	
Democratic hold		Swing	−3.7	

=== 2000s ===
Sha Tin District Council Election, 2007: Sun Tin Wai
Party	Candidate	Votes	%	±%
Democratic	Ching Cheung-ying	2,258	67.6	−16.5
Civil Force	Tong Hok-leung	1,081	32.4	
Majority		1,177	35.2	−30.5
Democratic hold		Swing		

Sha Tin District Council Election, 2003: Sun Tin Wai
Party	Candidate	Votes	%	±%
Democratic	Ching Cheung-ying	2,911	83.1	+22.6
Independent	Raymond Luk Ho-man	563	16.9	
Majority		2,348	65.7	+44.7
Democratic hold		Swing		

=== 1990s ===
Sha Tin District Council Election, 1999: Sun Tin Wai
Party	Candidate	Votes	%	±%
Democratic	Ching Cheung-ying	1,950	60.5	
Civil Force	Fung Lai-kuen	1,272	39.5	
Majority		678	21.0	
Democratic hold		Swing		

Sha Tin District Board Election, 1994: Sun Tin Wai
Party	Candidate	Votes	%	±%
Democratic	Ching Cheung-ying	uncontested		
Democratic win (new seat)				
