= Lei Uk Tsuen (Sha Tin District) =

Coordinates: 22.373733°N 114.184922°E

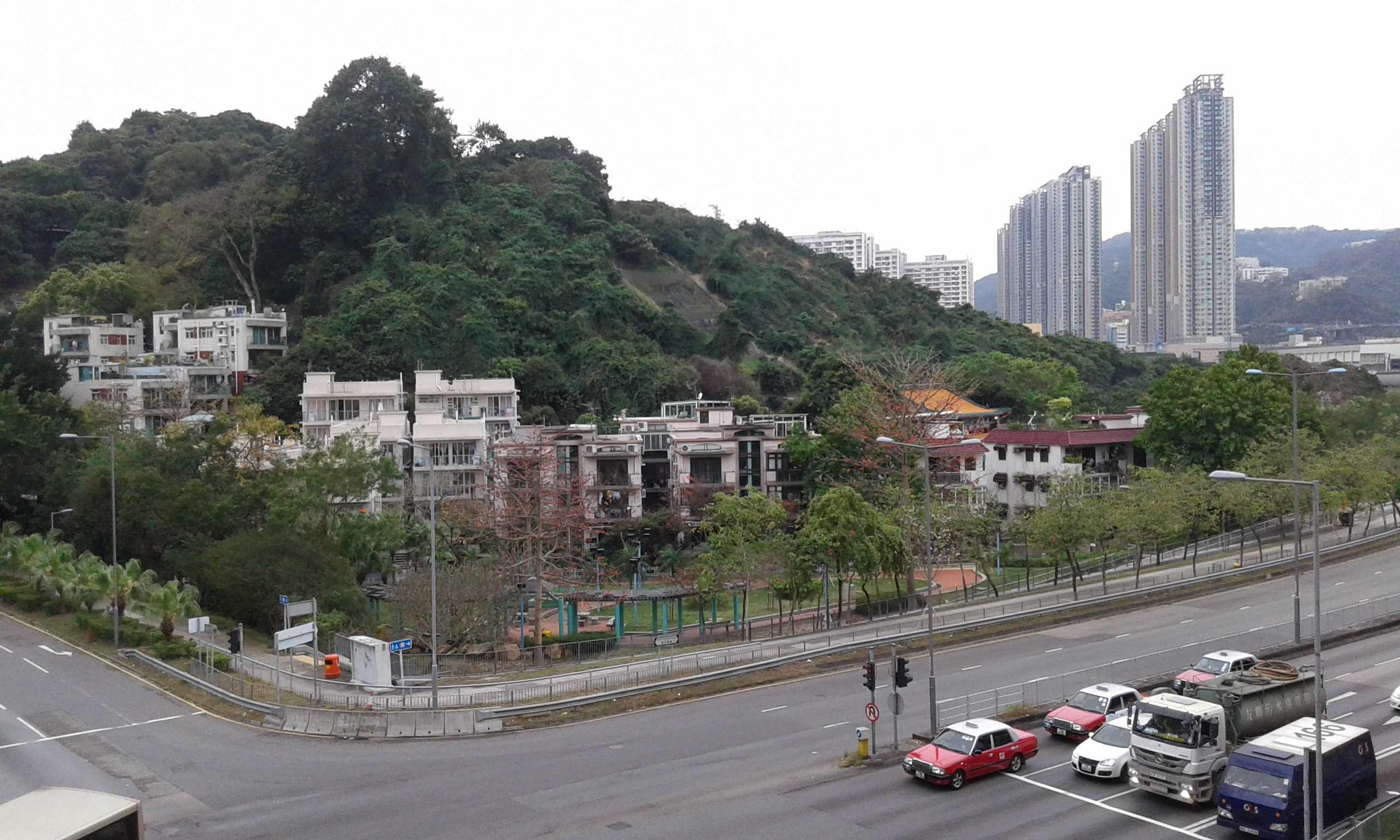
View of Lei Uk Tsuen along Che Kung Miu Road in Tai Wai. The hill in the background is Chun Shek (秦石).

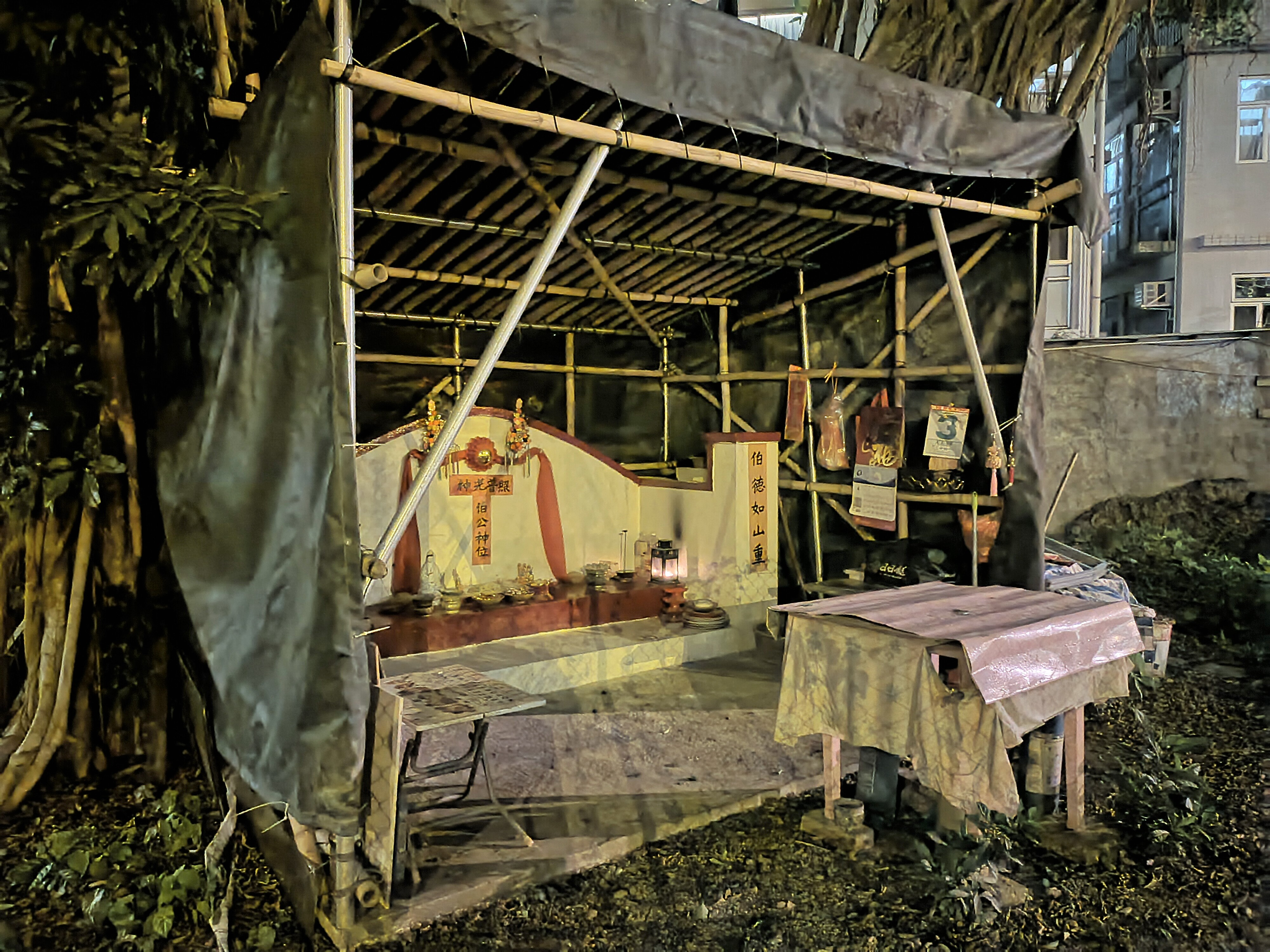
Pak Kung shrine in Lei Uk Tsuen.

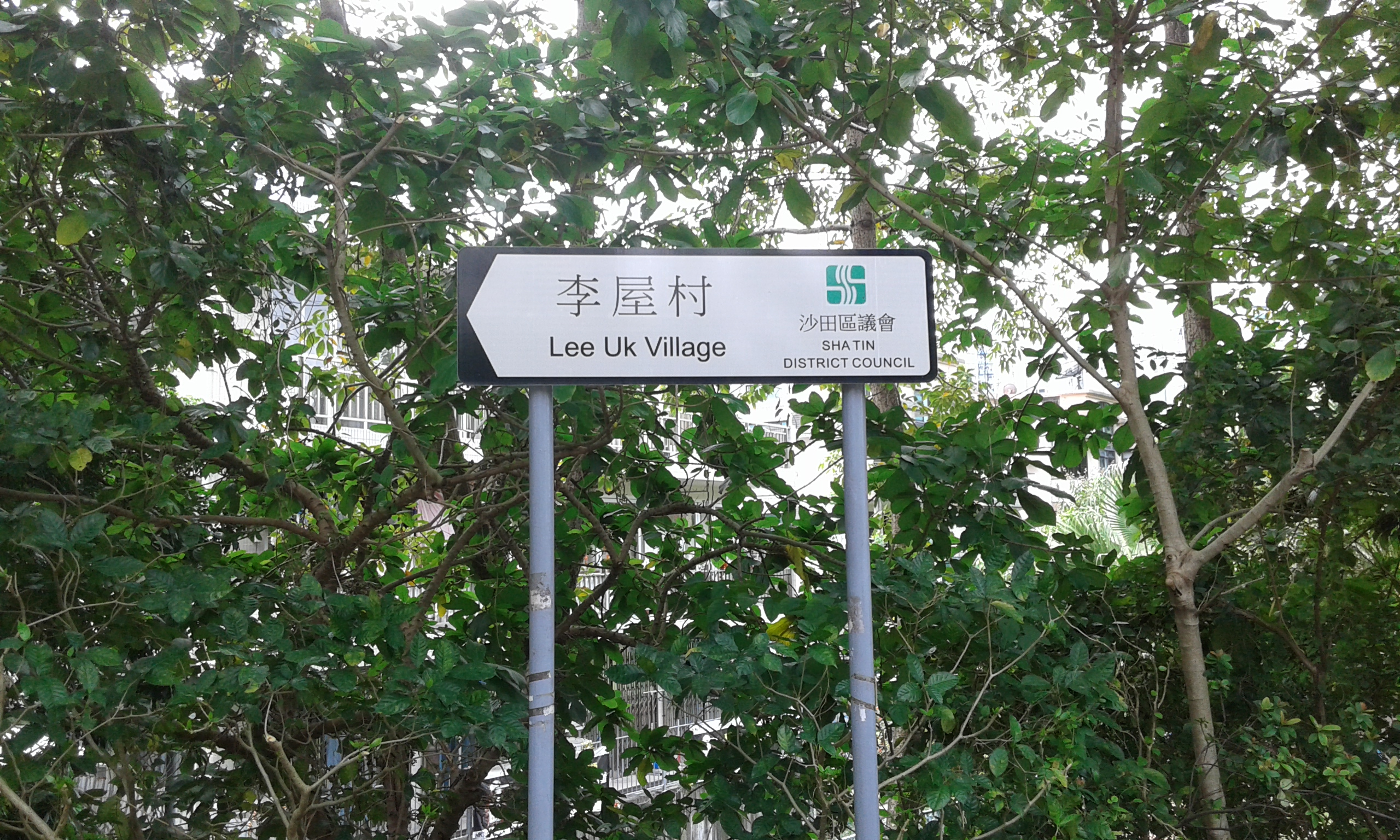
Lee Uk Village sign.

Lei Uk Tsuen (Chinese: 李屋村), sometimes transliterated as Lee Uk, is a village in Tai Wai, Sha Tin District, Hong Kong.

== Location ==
Lei Uk Tsuen is located east of Che Kung Temple and west of Chun Shek Estate.

== Administration ==
Lei Uk Tsuen is a recognized village under the New Territories Small House Policy.

== History ==
Lei Uk Tsuen was established by the Lei (李) clan in the late 17th century.

== See also ==
- Sha Tin Tau
- Sun Tin Wai (constituency)
