= Ching Cheung-ying =

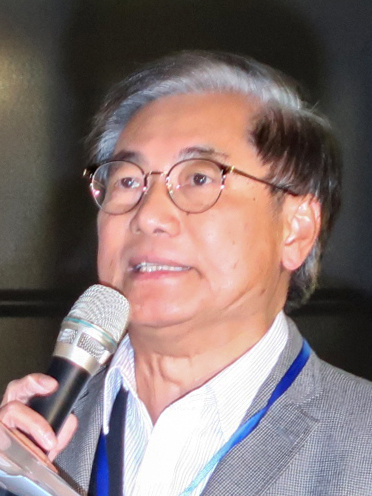

Ching Cheung-ying (Chinese: 程張迎, born 31 May 1958) is a Hong Kong politician and retired schoolteacher. He is formerly the representative of the Sun Tin Wai constituency of Sha Tin District Council and the former chairperson of the Council. He is a member of the Democratic Party.

== Teaching career ==
Ching was a Chinese Language and Chinese History teacher at Diocesan Boys' School. In 2002, he opposed the school's move from a free-of-charge Grant School to a fee-paying Direct Subsidy Scheme school. He criticized the move as a unilateral decision which sidelined teachers from the decision-making process, citing an internal secret ballot which showed that 70% of the school's teachers opposed the move. He argued that the Direct Subsidy Scheme excluded poor families from high-quality education and reduced social mobility. Ching commented in 2013 that, since the school became fee-paying, there had been a substantial decrease in the number of lower-class students, and the school's management had become less transparent. Ching retired from his teaching post in July 2018.

== Political career ==
He was first elected to the Sha Tin District Board in the 1985 election and has been an elected local councillor since then. He represents Sun Tin Wai Estate. He was elected to the Regional Council in the 1995 election and held the seat until the Regional Council's abolition in 1999. He is a member of the consultation panel of West Kowloon Cultural District and previously held advisory positions in various statutory arts and culture committees. As of 2019, he is the longest-serving councillor in the Sha Tin District Council.

Ching was awarded the Medal of Honour in 2007 "for his outstanding and dedicated community service in Sha Tin District."

He was elected to the Education sub-sector of the Election Committee in 2016, running as a member of the Professional Teachers' Union caucus which formed part of the Democracy 300+ campaign.

Political offices
New constituency	Member of the Sha Tin District Board; Representative for Che Kung Temple; 1985–1994	Constituency abolished
New constituency	Member of the Sha Tin District Council; Representative for Sun Tin Wai; 1994–2021	Vacant
Preceded by Ho Hau-cheung	Chairman of the Sha Tin District Council; 2021–present	Vacant
