= Public housing estates in Tai Wai =

Public housing estates in Tai Wai, Hong Kong

The following is an overview of Public housing estates in Tai Wai, Hong Kong

== History ==
The history of public housing estates in Tai Wai is linked to the history of Sha Tin New Town, which started in the 1970s.

== Overview ==
Name	Name in Chinese	Type	Inaug.	No Blocks	No Units	Notes
Chun Shek Estate	秦石邨	Public	1984	4	2,166	
Carado Garden	雲疊花園	PSPS	1990	6	1,988	
Fung Shing Court	豐盛苑	HOS	1985	3	2,448	
Grandway Garden	富嘉花園	PSPS	1989	3	864	
Holford Garden	海福花園	PSPS	1985	3	800	
Ka Keng Court	嘉徑苑	HOS	2002	2	640	
Ka Tin Court	嘉田苑	HOS	1988	6	1,680	
Ka Shun Court	嘉順苑	HOS	2018	1	248	
King Tin Court	景田苑	HOS	1983	6	1,424	
Hin Keng Estate	顯徑邨	TPS	1986	8	1,004	
Hin Yiu Estate	顯耀邨	Public	2005	1	799	
Lung Hang Estate	隆亨邨	Public	1983	6	4,376	
May Shing Court	美城苑	HOS	1982	3	2,192	
Mei Chung Court	美松苑	HOS	1996	6	1,940	
Mei Lam Estate	美林邨	Public	1981	4	4,156	
Mei Pak Court	美柏苑	HOS	2017	1	288	
Mei Tin Estate	美田邨	Public	2006	8	6,700	
Mei Ying Court	美盈苑	HOS	2017	1	216	
Sun Chui Estate	新翠邨	Public	1983	8	6,692	
Sun Tin Wai Estate	新田圍邨	Public	1981	8	3,430	

== Chun Shek Estate ==
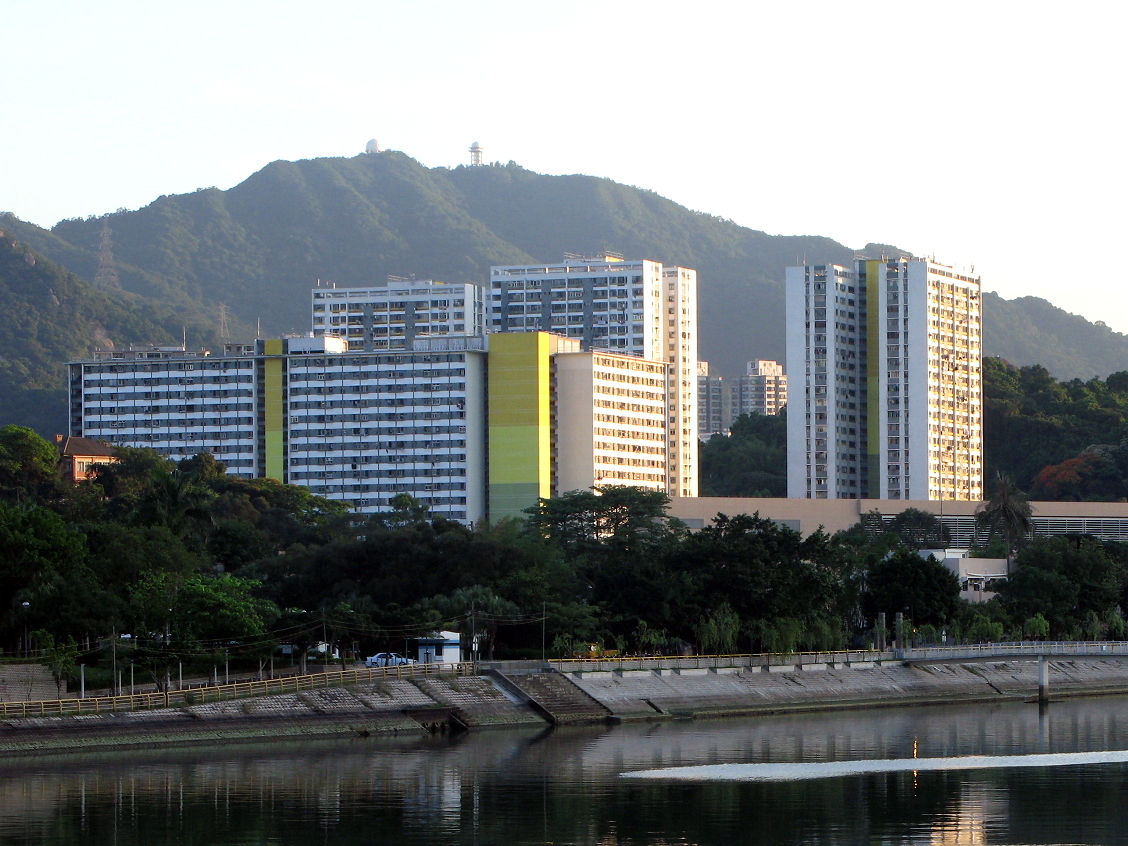
Chun Shek Estate with Beacon Hill in the background.

Chun Shek Estate (秦石邨) is located near Che Kung Temple and Che Kung Temple station. It consists of 4 residential blocks completed in 1984.

Name	Type	Completion
Shek Yuk House	Old Slab	1984
Shek Fai House	Single H	1984
Shek Ying House	Double H	1984
Shek Jing House	Double H	1984

== Carado Garden ==
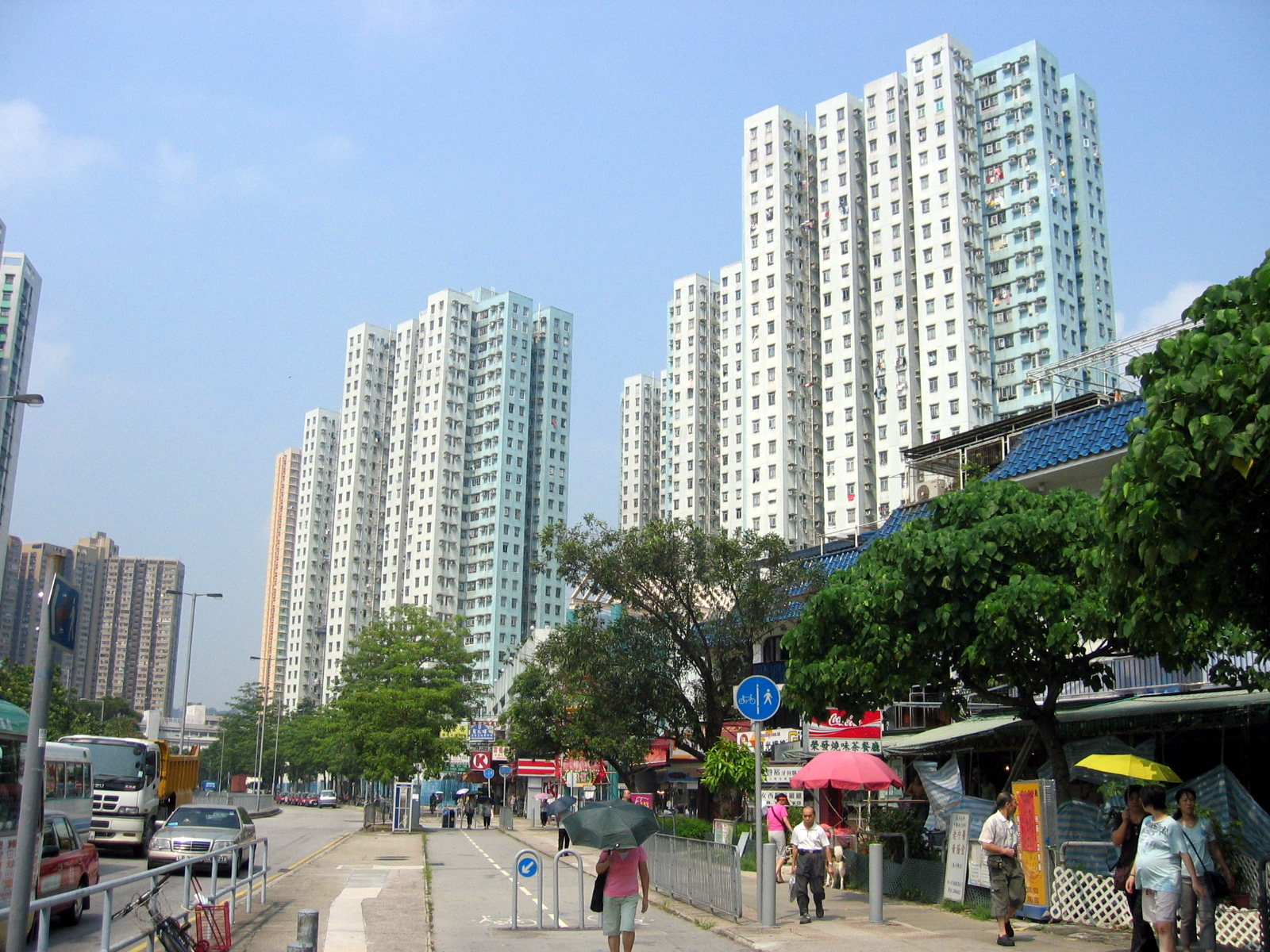
Carado Garden

Carado Garden (雲疊花園) is a Private Sector Participation Scheme court in Tai Wai, near Tin Sam Village, Lung Hang Estate and Hin Yiu Estate. It consists of 6 blocks built in 1990.

Name	Type	Completion
Block 1	Private Sector Participation Scheme	1990
Block 2	Private Sector Participation Scheme	1990
Block 3	Private Sector Participation Scheme	1990
Block 4	Private Sector Participation Scheme	1990
Block 5	Private Sector Participation Scheme	1990
Block 6	Private Sector Participation Scheme	1990

== Fung Shing Court ==
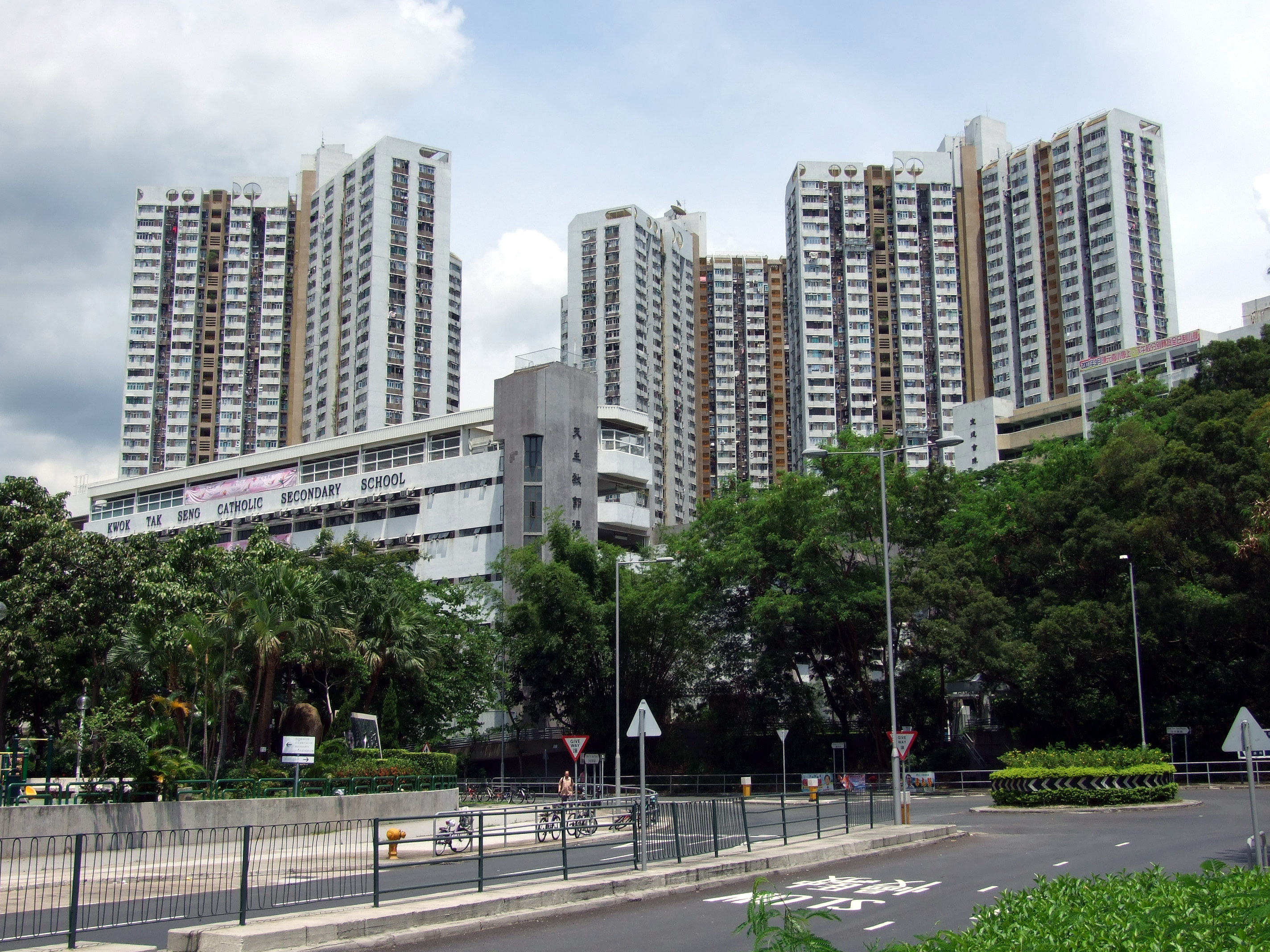
Fung Shing Court

Fung Shing Court (豐盛苑) is a Home Ownership Scheme court in Tai Wai, near Sun Tin Wai Estate. It consists of three blocks built in 1985.

Name	Type	Completion
Wing Shing House	Trident 2	1985
Wah Shing House	Trident 2	1985
Fu Shing House	Trident 2	1985

== Grandway Garden ==
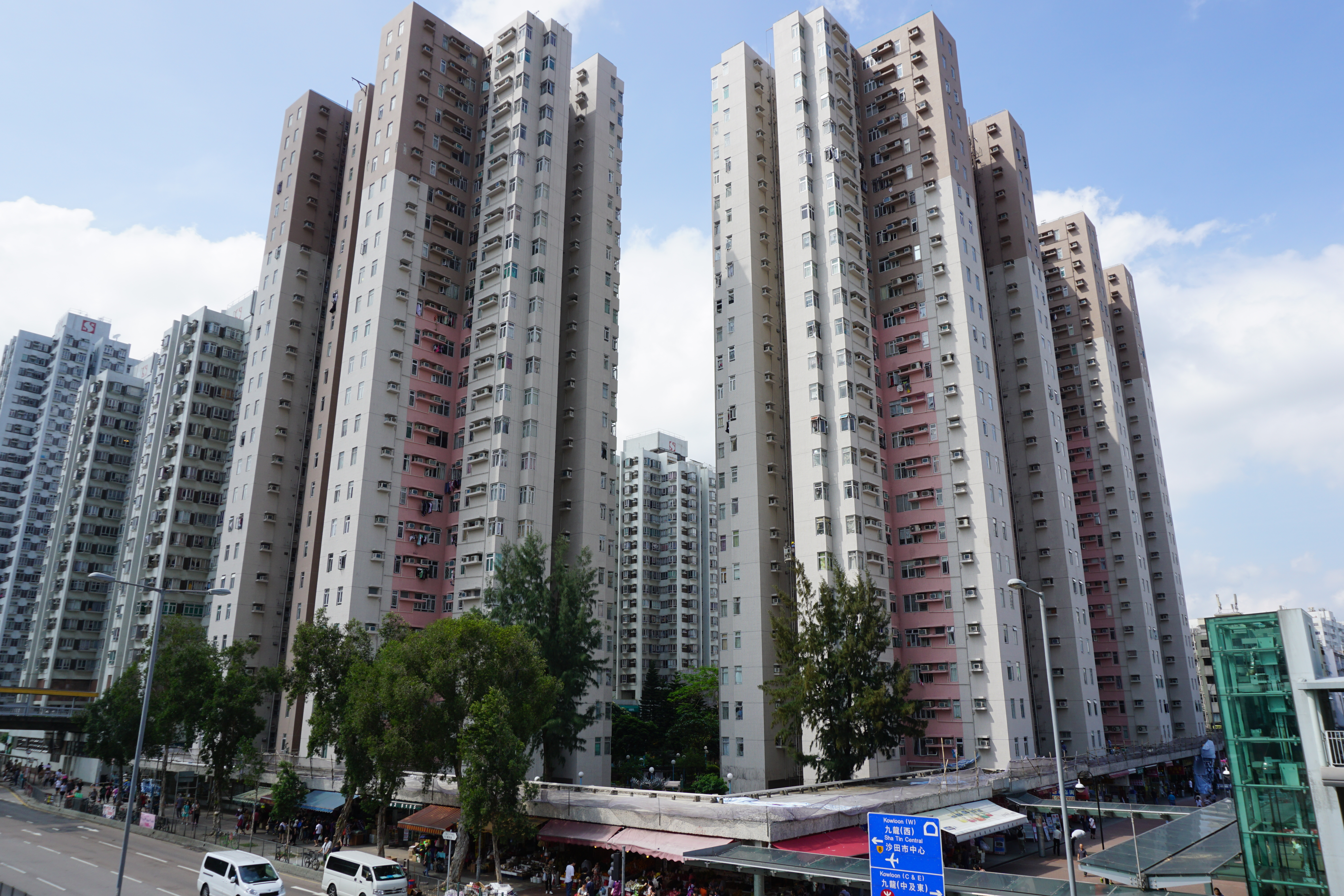
Grandway Garden

Grandway Garden (富嘉花園) is a Private Sector Participation Scheme court in Tai Wai, near MTR Tai Wai station and Holford Garden. It was jointly developed by the Hong Kong Housing Authority and Chevalier Group. It consists of 3 blocks built in 1989.

Name	Type	Completion
Block 1	Private Sector Participation Scheme	1989
Block 2	Private Sector Participation Scheme	1989
Block 3	Private Sector Participation Scheme	1989

== Hin Keng Estate / Hin Yiu Estate ==
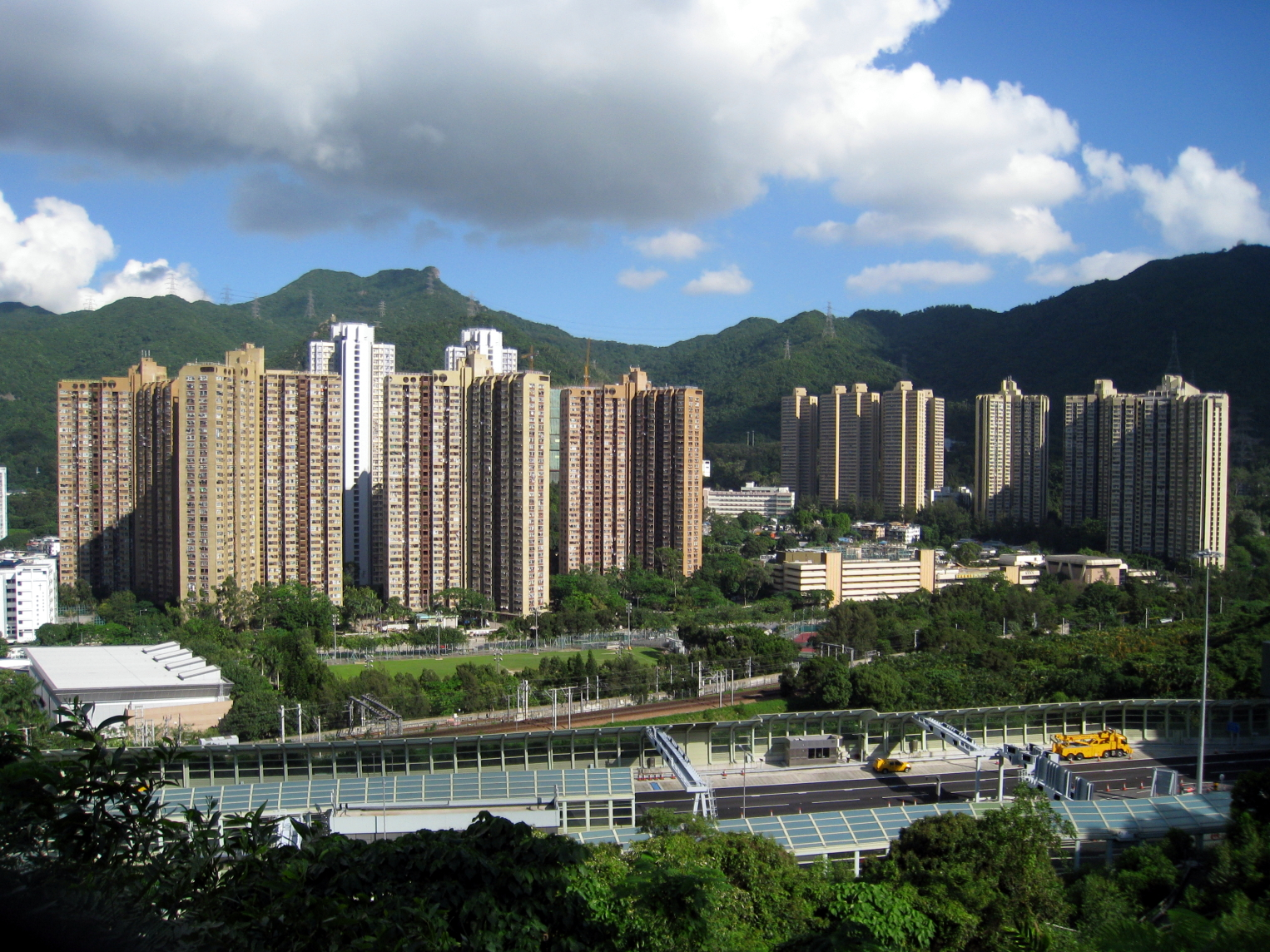
Hin Keng Estate

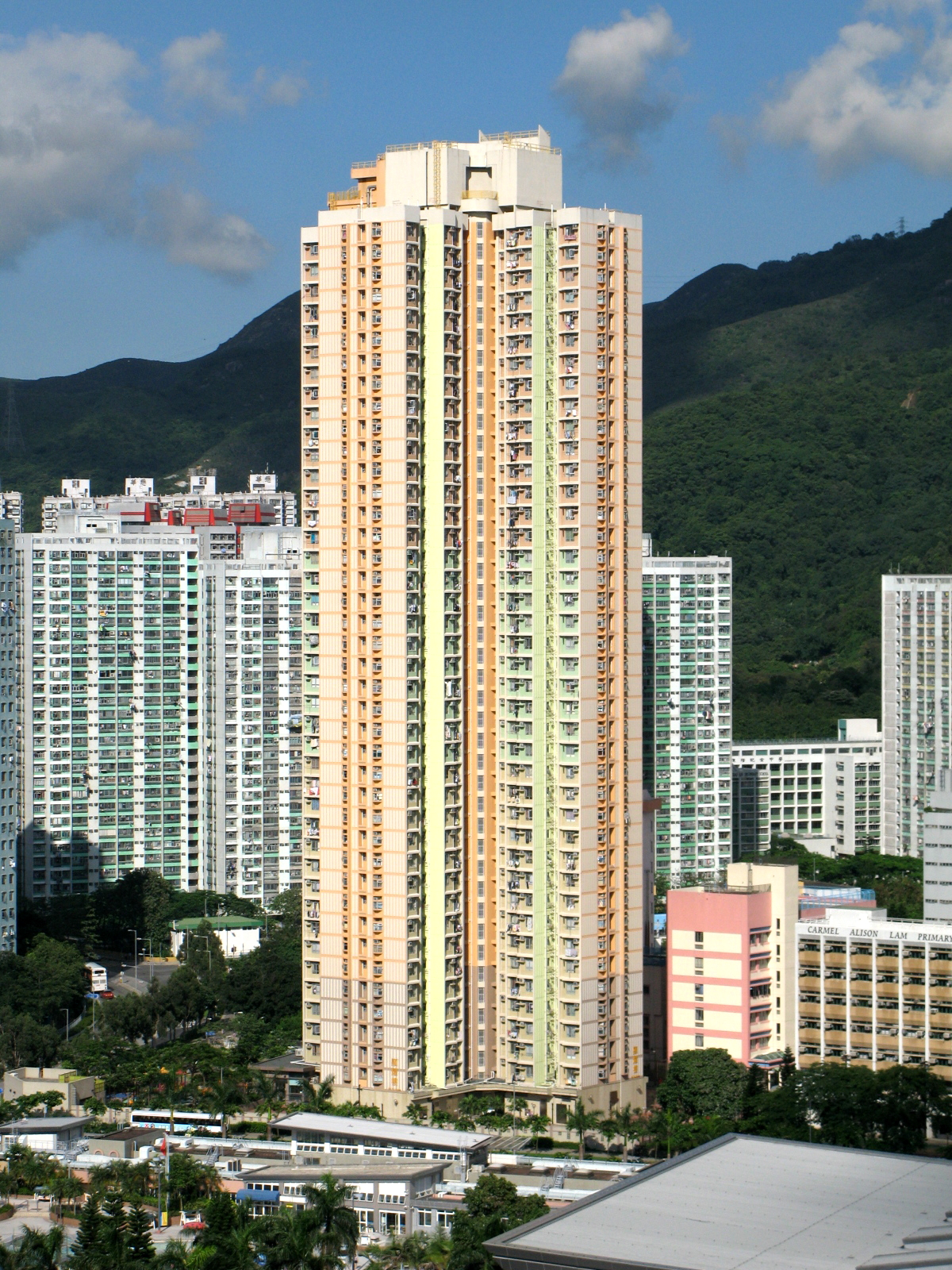
Hin Yiu Estate

Hin Keng Estate (顯徑邨) is a mixed public and TPS estate at the south of Tai Wai. Named for nearby Hin Tin Village (顯田村) and Keng Hau Village (徑口村), the estate consists of 8 residential buildings completed between 1986 and 1989. Some of the flats were sold to tenants through Tenants Purchase Scheme Phase 3 in 2000. There is another adjacent public estate, Hin Yiu Estate (顯耀邨), which has only one residential building.

Since Hin Keng Estate is far away from MTR Tai Wai station, the main transportation is buses and minibuses currently in there. On 14 February 2020, Hin Keng station was opened to provide railway service to Hin Keng residents as part of the Sha Tin to Central Link project. The station is now served by the Tuen Ma line.

=== Hin Keng Estate houses ===
Name	Type	Completion
Hin Pui House	Trident 2	1986
Hin Tak House	Trident 2	1986
Hin Yeung House	Trident 2	1986
Hin Hing House	Trident 2	1986
Hin Yau House	Trident 3	1988
Hin Wan House	Trident 4	1989
Hin Fu House	Trident 4	1989
Hin Kwai House	Trident 4	1989

=== Hin Yiu Estate houses ===
Name	Type	Completion
Hin Yiu House	New Harmony 1	2005

== Holford Garden ==
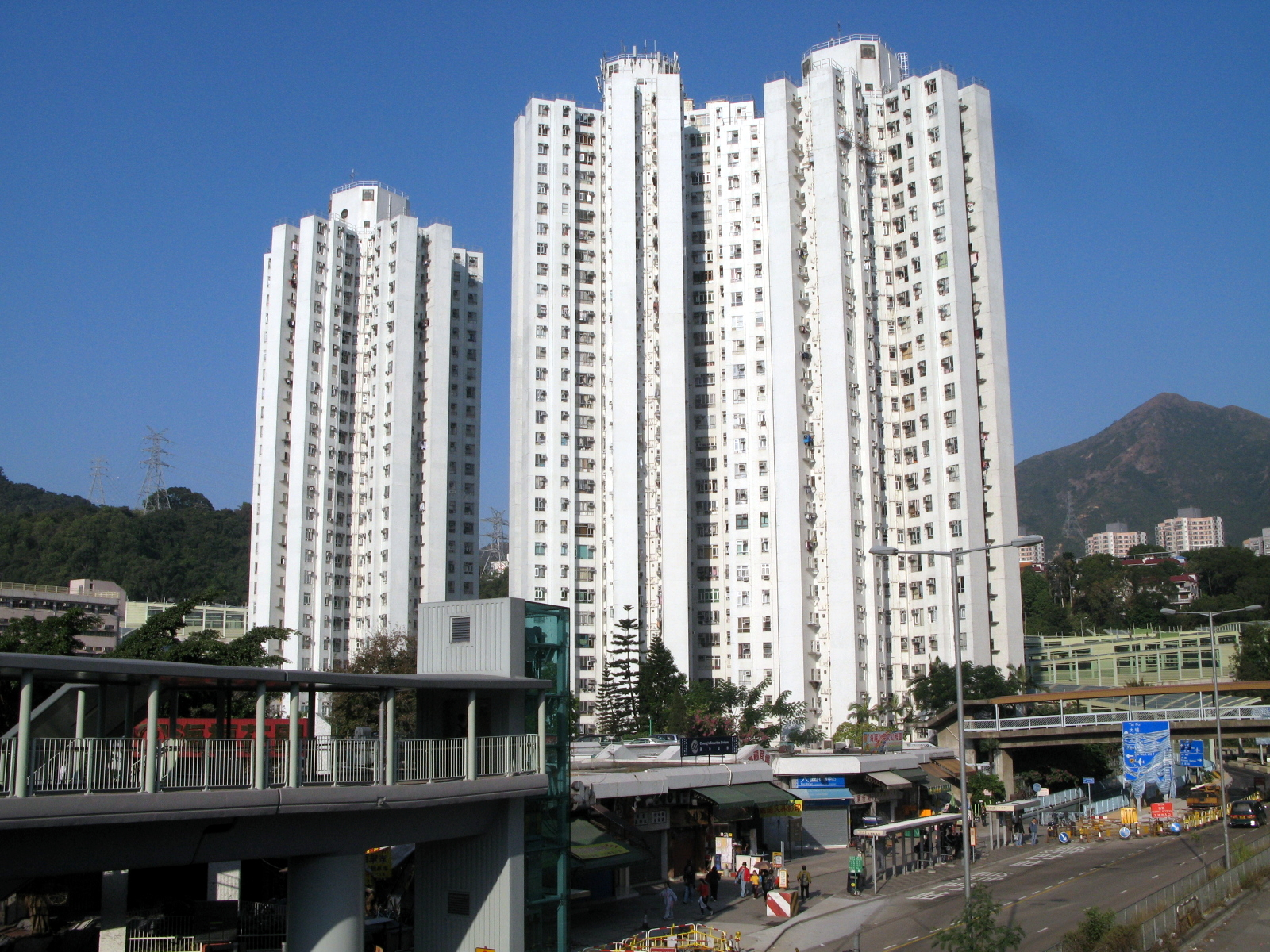
Holford Garden

Holford Garden (海福花園) is a Private Sector Participation Scheme court in Tai Wai, near MTR Tai Wai station. It is the first PSPS court in Sha Tin District. It consists of 3 blocks built in 1985, constructed by China State Construction Engineering Corporation.

Name	Type	Completion
Fook Siu Court	Private Sector Participation Scheme	1985
Fook Hey Court	Private Sector Participation Scheme	1985
Fook Ki Court	Private Sector Participation Scheme	1985

== Ka Shun Court ==
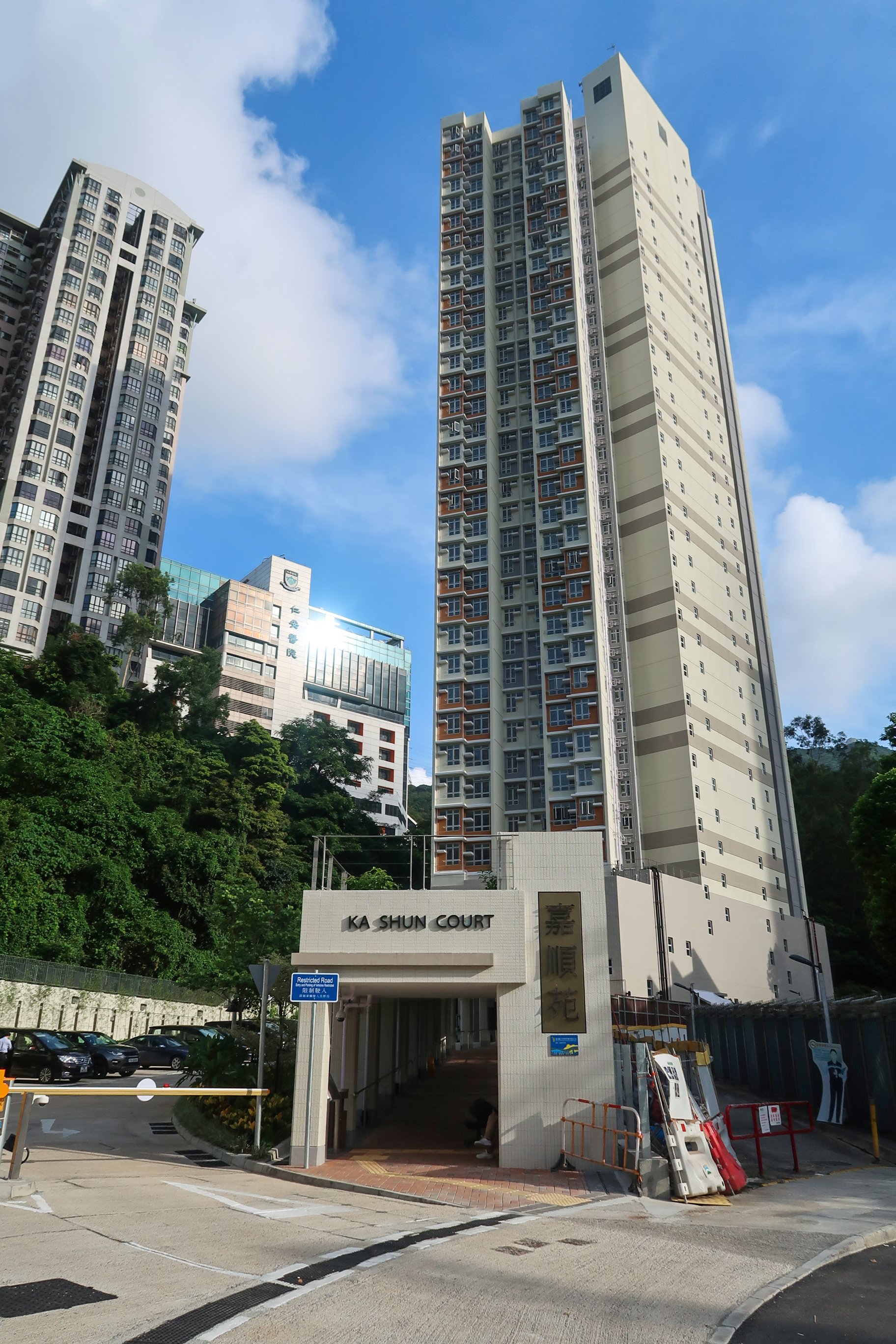
Ka Shun Court

Ka Shun Court (嘉順苑) is a Home Ownership Scheme court in Tai Wai, near Hin Keng Estate and Union Hospital. It is located in Hin Tin, within walking distance of the Hin Keng station which was opened on 14 February 2020. It is a single block with totally 248 flats completed in 2018.

Name	Type	Completion
Ka Shun Court	Non-standard	2018

== Ka Keng Court ==
Ka Keng Court (嘉徑苑) is a Home Ownership Scheme court in Tai Wai, near Hin Keng Estate. It consists of two Concord blocks built in 2002.

Name	Type	Completion
Ka Oi House	Concord 1	2002
Ka Sin House	Concord 1	2002

== Ka Tin Court ==
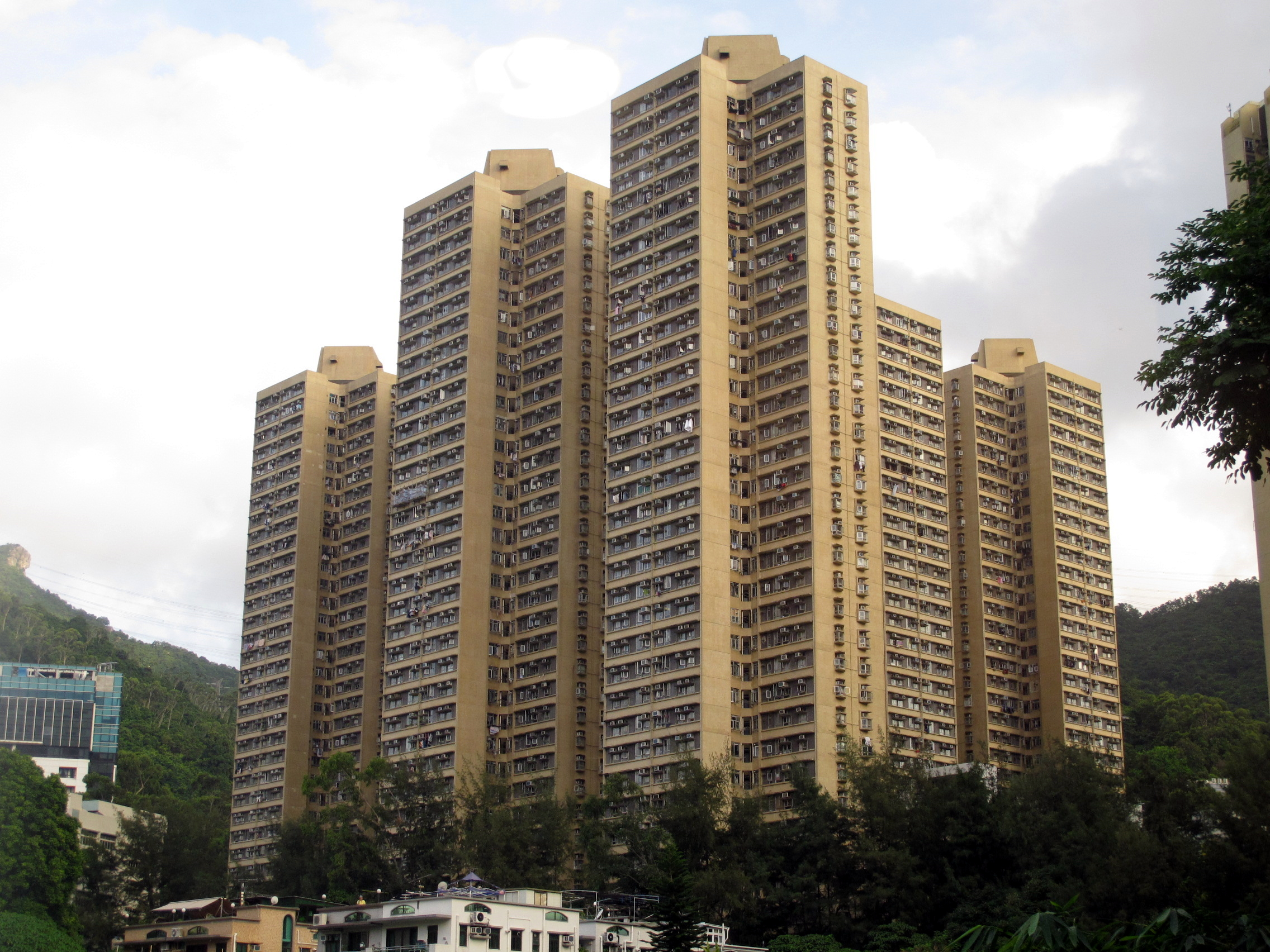
Ka Tin Court

Ka Tin Court (嘉田苑) is a Home Ownership Scheme court in Tai Wai, near Hin Keng Estate. It consists of six Flexi blocks built in 1988.

Name	Type	Completion
Ka Hong House	Flexi 3	1988
Ka Kei House	Flexi 3	1988
Ka Yin House	Flexi 3	1988
Ka Wai House	Flexi 3	1988
Ka Yee House	Flexi 3	1988
Ka Wing House	Flexi 3	1988

== King Tin Court ==
King Tin Court (景田苑) is a Home Ownership Scheme court in Tai Wai, near Lung Hang Estate. It consists of 6 blocks built in 1983.

Name	Type	Completion
Man Sam House	Flexi 2	1983
Ching Sam House	Flexi 2	1983
Bing Sam House	Flexi 2	1983
Hung Sam House	Flexi 2	1983
Hang Sam House	Flexi 2	1983
King Sam House	Flexi 2	1983

== Lung Hang Estate ==
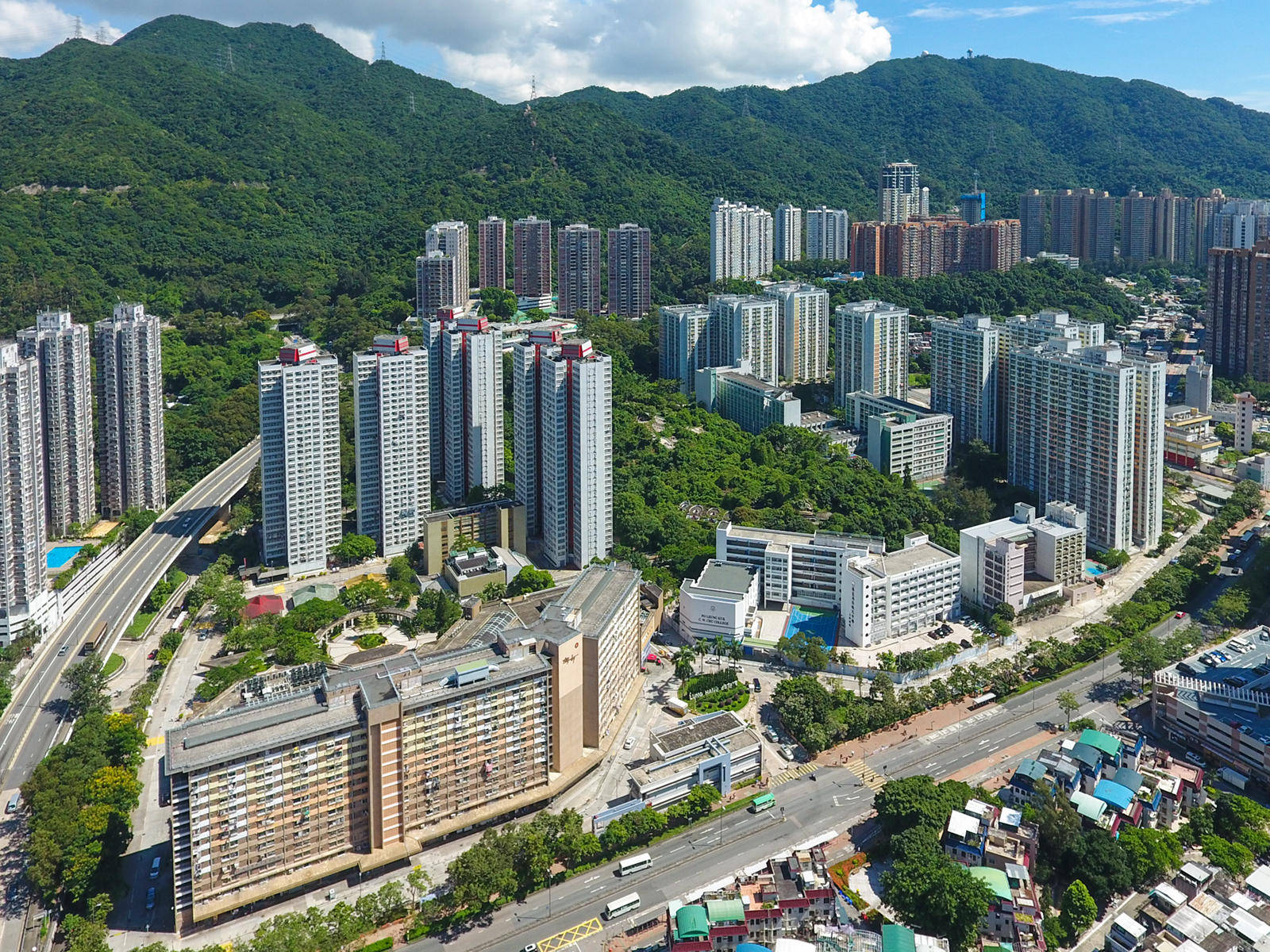
Lung Hang Estate

Lung Hang Estate (隆亨邨) is located between Hin Keng Estate and Sun Chui Estate, and consists of 6 residential blocks completed in 1983 and 1985 respectively.

Name	Type	Completion
Wing Sam House	Old Slab	1985
Hok Sam House	Double H	1983
Lok Sam House	Double H	1983
Sin Sam House	Twin Tower	1983
Sheung Sam House	Twin Tower	1983
Wai Sam House	Twin Tower	1983

== Mei Lam Estate / May Shing Court / Mei Chung Court ==
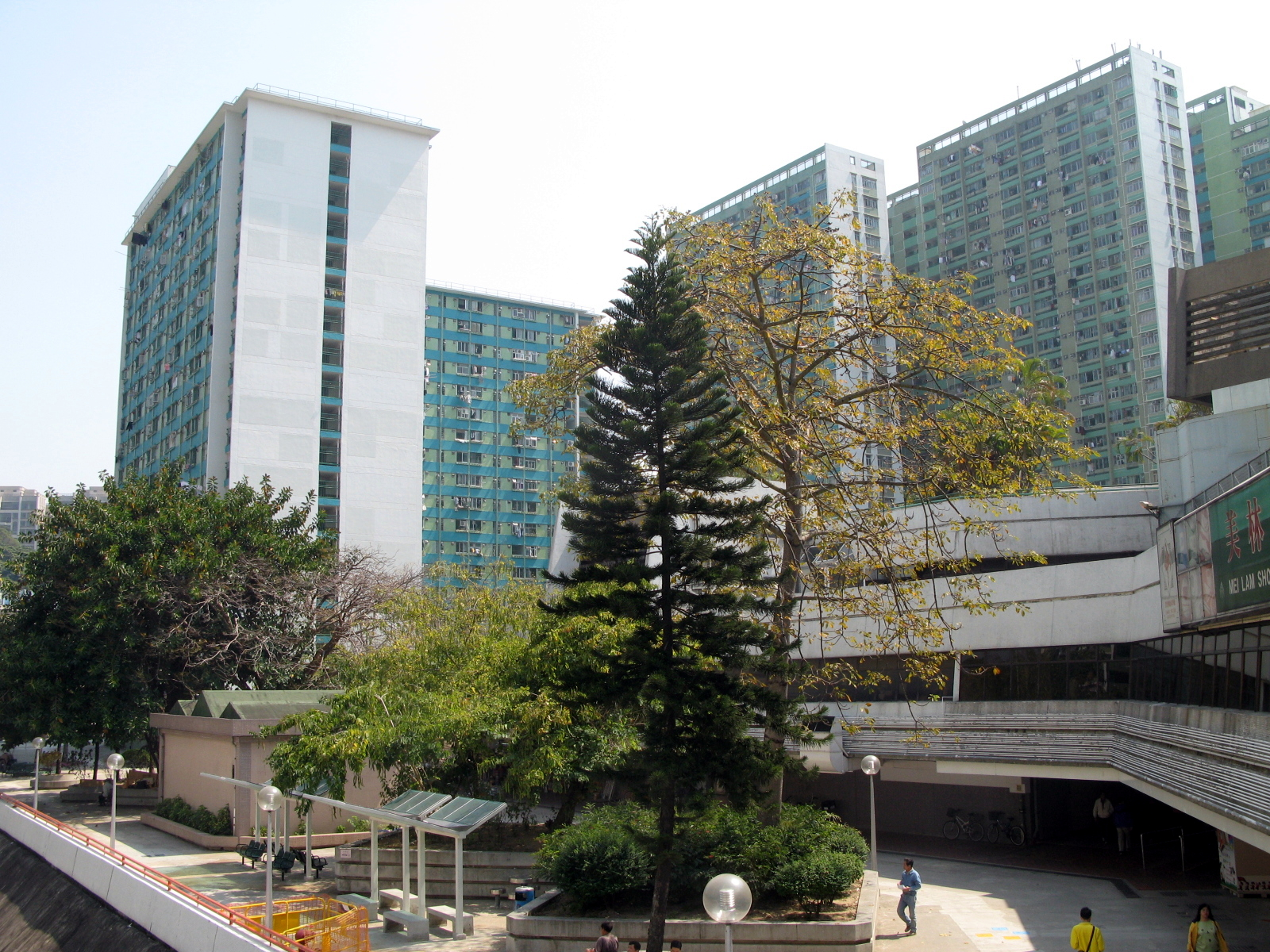
Mei Lam Estate

Mei Lam Estate (美林邨) is a public estate consisting of 4 residential buildings with 4,100 rental flats, a shopping centre and a sports centre, located along Shing Mun River Channel and near Mei Chung Court, May Shing Court and Shing Mun Tunnel. It was constructed in three phases. Phase 1 (Mei Fung House, Mei Yeung House, Mei Tao House and Mei Lam Shopping Centre) are located at the south side of Shing Mun River Channel, while Phase 2 (Mei Wai House) and Phase 3 (Mei Lam Sports Centre) are located at the north side. The two sides are connected by a footbridge. The authorized population was 11,400 as at end December 2007.

== Mei Pak Court ==
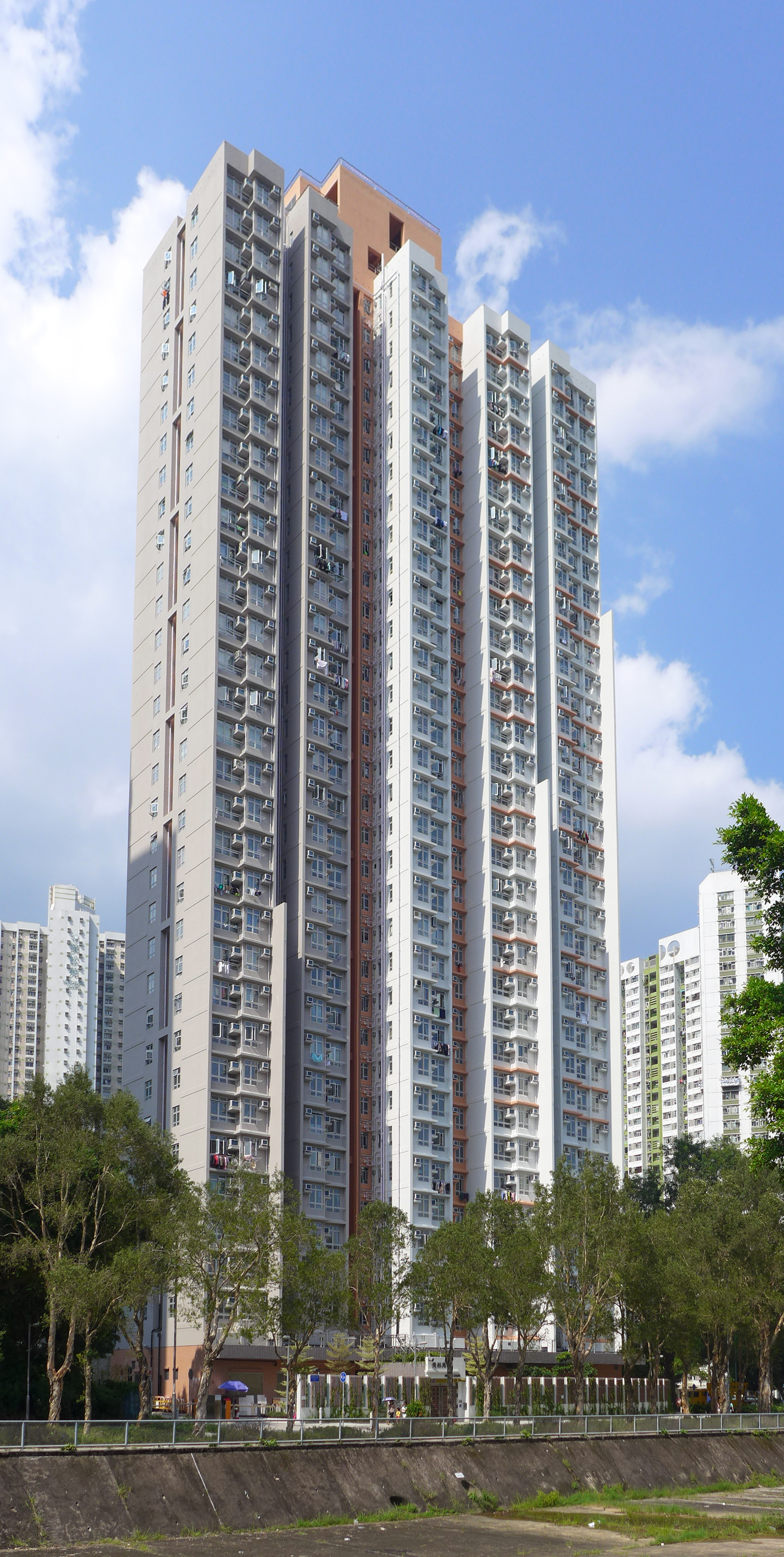
Mei Pak Court

Mei Pak Court (美柏苑) is a Home Ownership Scheme court in Heung Fun Liu, Tai Wai of Sha Tin District, near May Shing Court. It is one 33-storey block court with 288 flats in total. It was sold in 2014 and completed in 2017.

== Mei Tin Estate ==
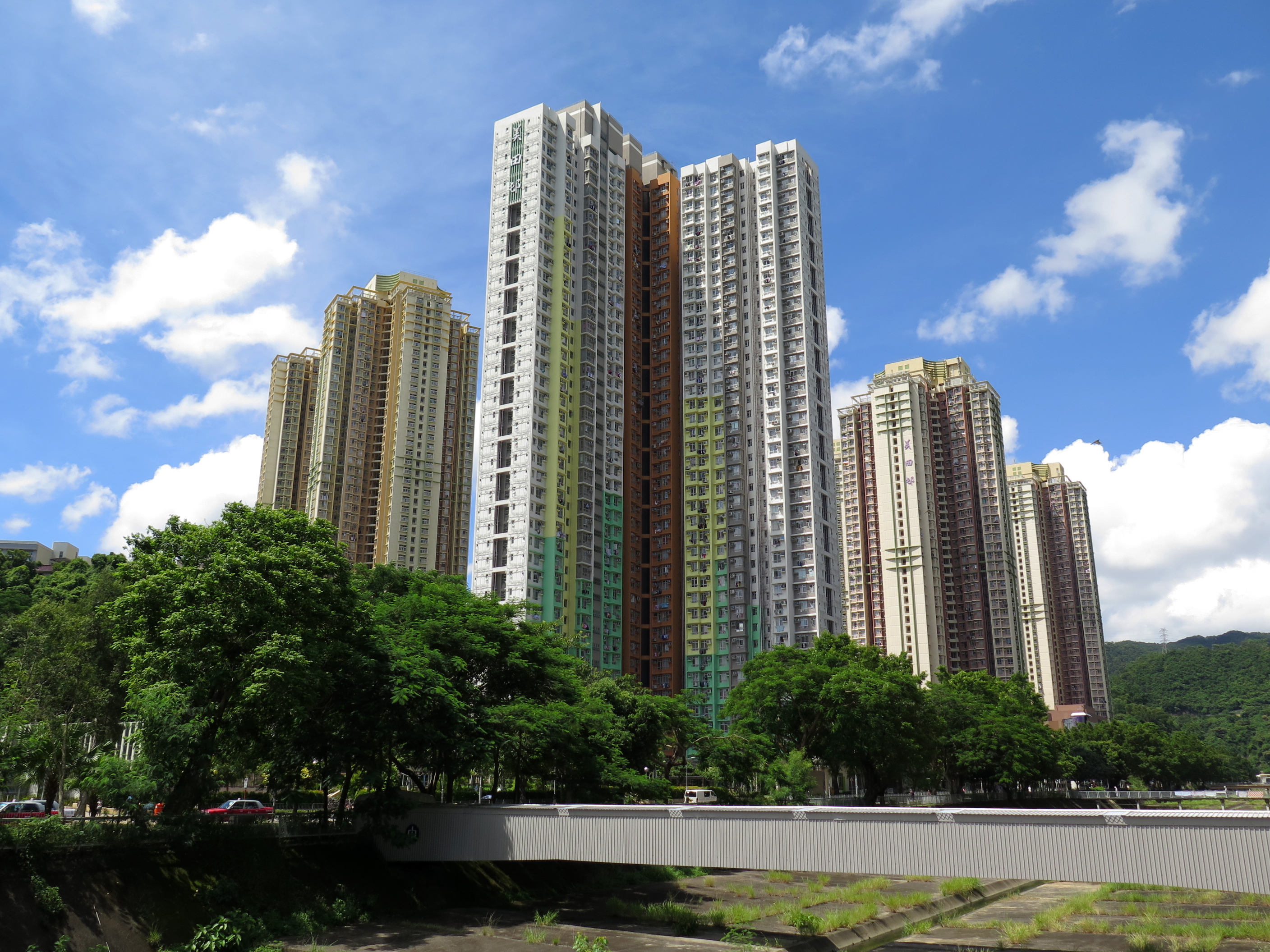
Mei Tin Estate

Mei Tin Estate (美田邨) is located at the south of Shing Mun River Channel and near Mei Lam Estate. Formerly the site of a village called Heung Fan Liu (香粉寮), the estate consists of 7 residential blocks in Phase 1, 2 and 3 completed in 2006 and 2008. Phase 4 was completed by 2013.

English name	Chinese name	Type	Completed
Mei Sau House	美秀樓	New Harmony 1	2006
Mei Lai House	美麗樓	New Harmony 1	2006
Mei King House	美景樓	New Harmony 1	2006
Mei Chi House	美致樓	New Harmony 1	2006
Mei Lok House	美樂樓	New Harmony 1	2008
Mei Moon House	美滿樓	New Harmony 1	2008
Mei Ting House	美庭樓	New Harmony 1	2008
Mei Chuen House	美全樓	Non-standard block (Y-shaped)	2013

== Mei Ying Court ==
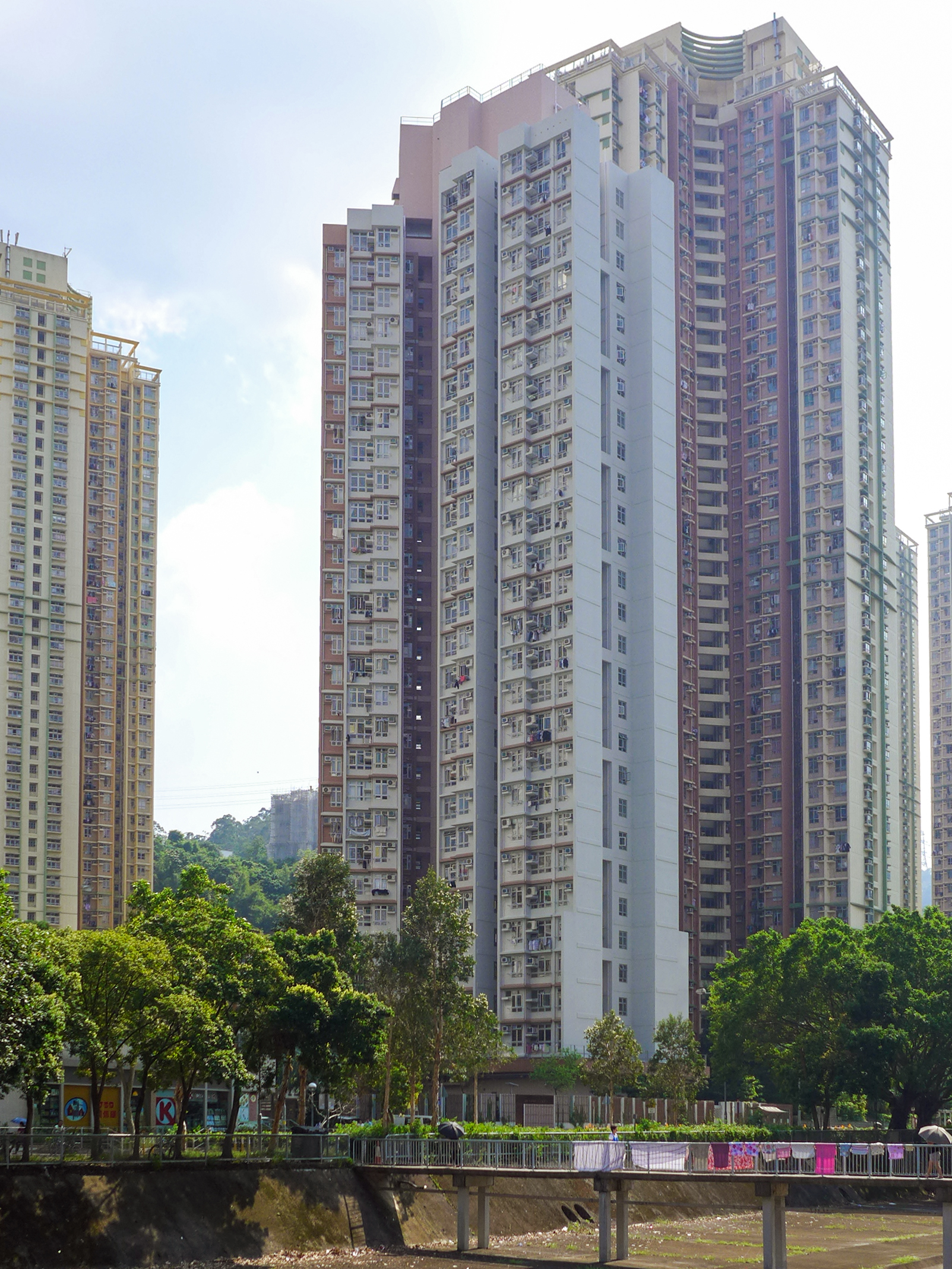
Mei Ying Court

Mei Ying Court (美盈苑) is a Home Ownership Scheme court in Heung Fun Liu, Tai Wai of Sha Tin District, near Mei Tin Estate. It is a single-block court with 216 flats in total. It was sold in 2014 and completed in 2017.

== Sun Chui Estate ==
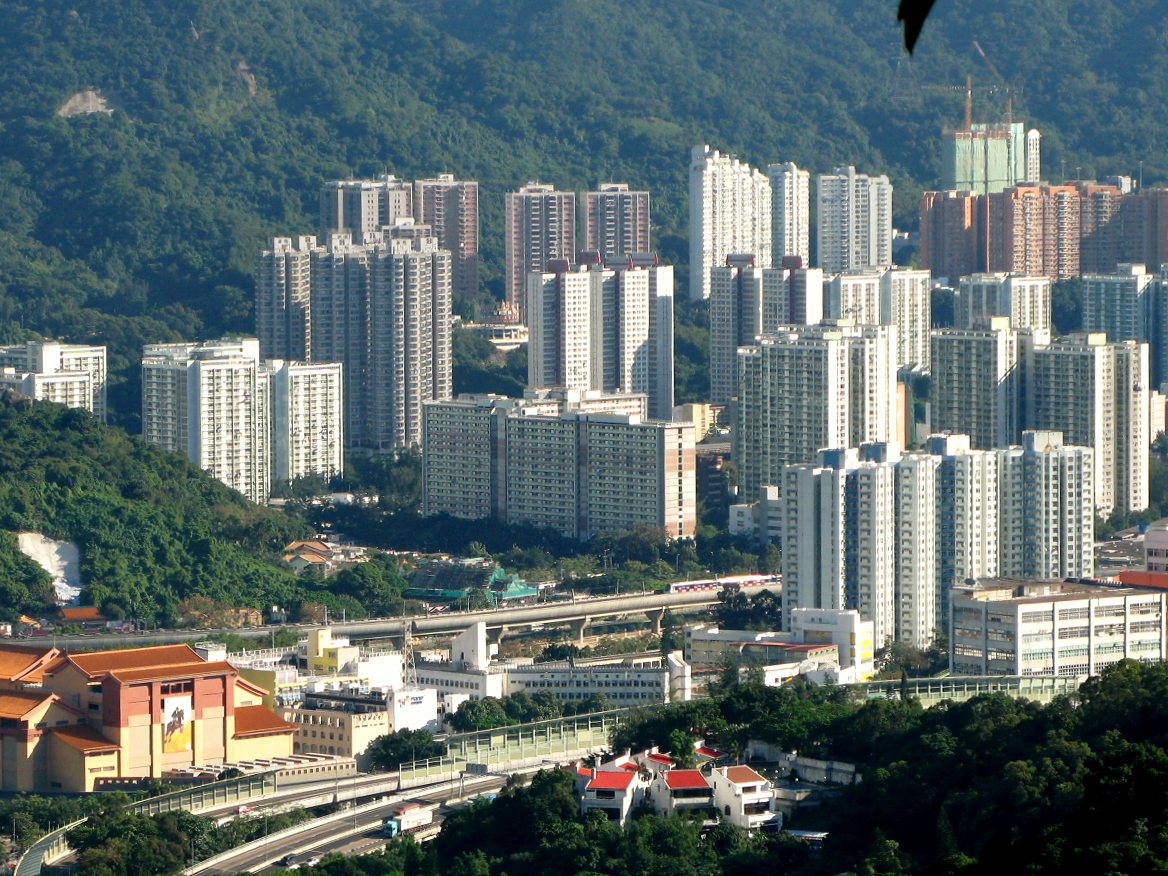
Sun Chui Estate

Sun Chui Estate (新翠邨) is located near Lung Hang Estate, Che Kung Miu Temple and Tai Wai station. It consists of 8 residential buildings completed in 1983, 1984 and 1985 respectively.

Name	Type	Completion
Sun Ming House	Double H	1985
Sun Yuet House	Double H	1983
Sun Wai House	Double H	1983
Sun Fong House	Old Slab	1983
Sun Yee House	Old Slab	1984
Sun Chun House	Twin Tower	1984
Sun Hok House	Twin Tower	1984
Sun Kit House	Twin Tower	1984

== Sun Tin Wai Estate ==
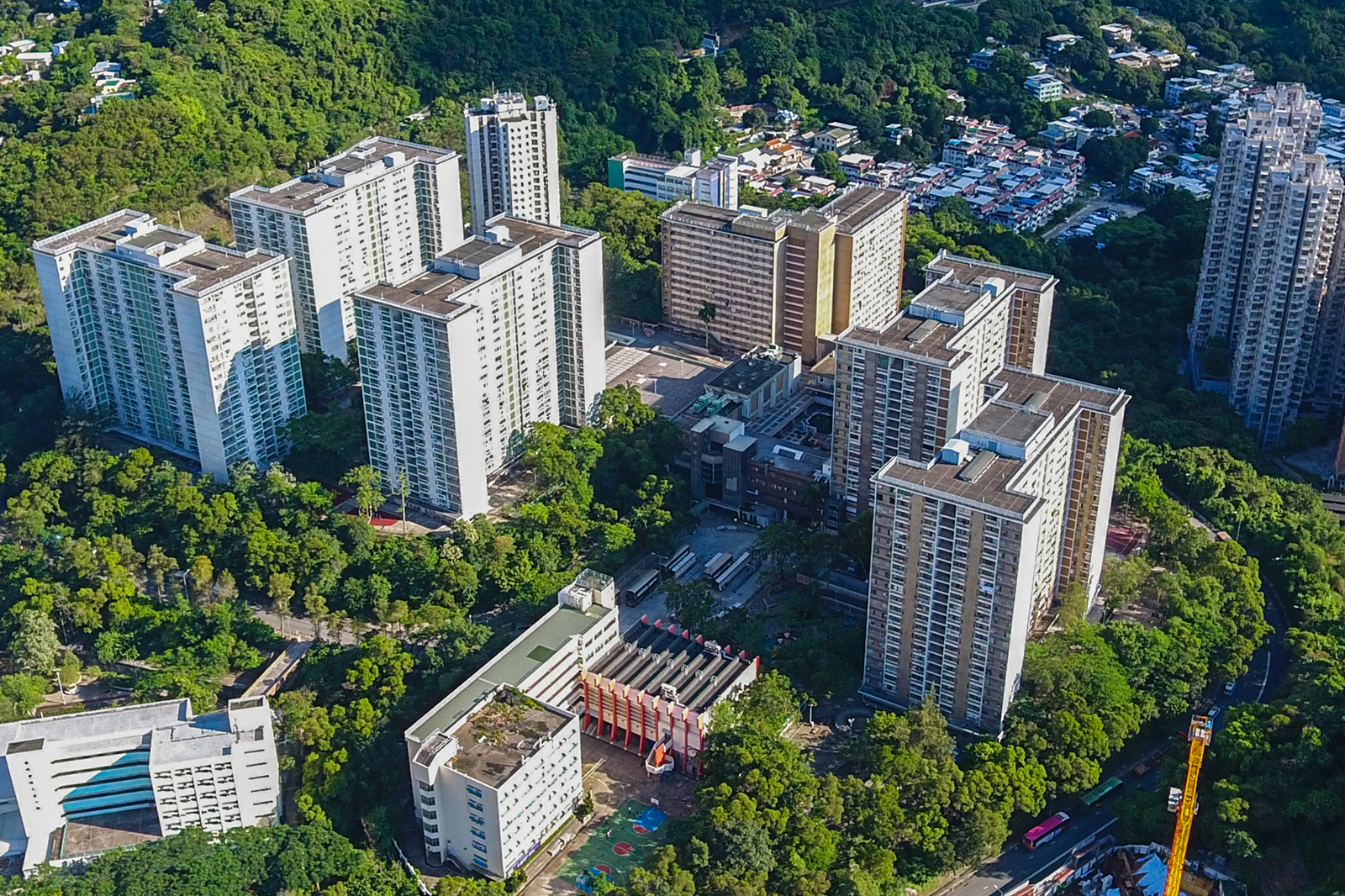
Sun Tin Wai Estate

Sun Tin Wai Estate (新田圍邨) was built on the hill at the south of Chun Shek Estate along Lion Rock Tunnel Road. It consists of 8 residential blocks completed in 1981 and 1982.

Name	Type	Completion
Yu Wai House	Old Cruciform	1981
Fung Wai House	Single I	1981
Shing Wai House	Single I	1981
Foo Wai House	Single I	1981
Yan Wai House	Single I	1982
Wing Wai House	Single I	1982
Fook Wai House	Old Slab	1982
Hong Wai House	Old Slab	1982

== See also ==
- Public housing in Hong Kong
- List of public housing estates in Hong Kong
