= Chun Shek Estate =

Public housing estate in Sha Tin, Hong Kong

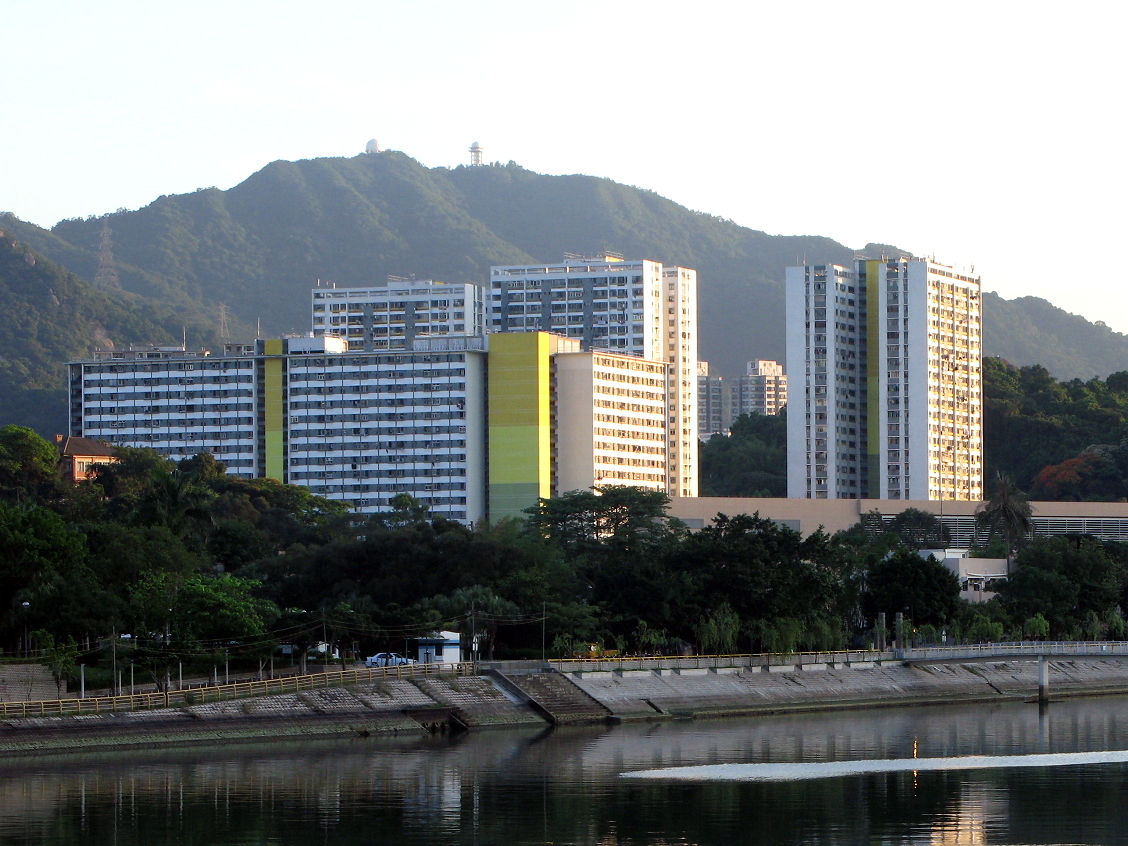
- Chun Shek Estate
- Interactive map of Chun Shek Estate

General information
- Location: 1 Shing Tin Street, Tai Wai; New Territories, Hong Kong
- Coordinates: 22.374379°N 114.187268°E
- Status: Completed
- Category: Public rental housing
- Population: 5,324 (2016)
- No. of blocks: 8
- No. of units: 2,166

Construction
- Constructed: 1984; 42 years ago
- Authority: Hong Kong Housing Authority

Chun Shek Estate (Chinese: 秦石邨) is a public housing estate in Tai Wai, New Territories, Hong Kong near Che Kung Temple and Che Kung Temple station. It consists of four residential blocks completed in 1984.

== Background ==
The estate was formerly known as Sha Tin Tau Estate. However, in November 1981, it was renamed as Chun Shek Estate.

== Houses ==
Name	Chinese name	Building type	Completed
Shek Yuk House	石玉樓	Old Slab	1984
Shek Fai House	石暉樓	Single H	1984
Shek Ying House	石瑩樓	Double H	1984
Shek Jing House	石晶樓	Double H	1984

== Demographics ==
According to the 2016 by-census, Chun Shek Estate had a population of 5,324. The median age was 49.7 and the majority of residents (98.5 per cent) were of Chinese ethnicity. The average household size was 2.5 people. The median monthly household income of all households (i.e. including both economically active and inactive households) was HK$18,650.

== Politics ==
Chun Shek Estate is located in Chun Fung constituency of the Sha Tin District Council. It is currently represented by Chandler Chan Nok-hang, who was elected in the 2019 elections.

== See also ==
- Public housing estates in Tai Wai
- Lei Uk Tsuen (Sha Tin District)
