= Hin Keng station =

MTR station in New Territories, Hong Kong

Hin Keng 顯徑
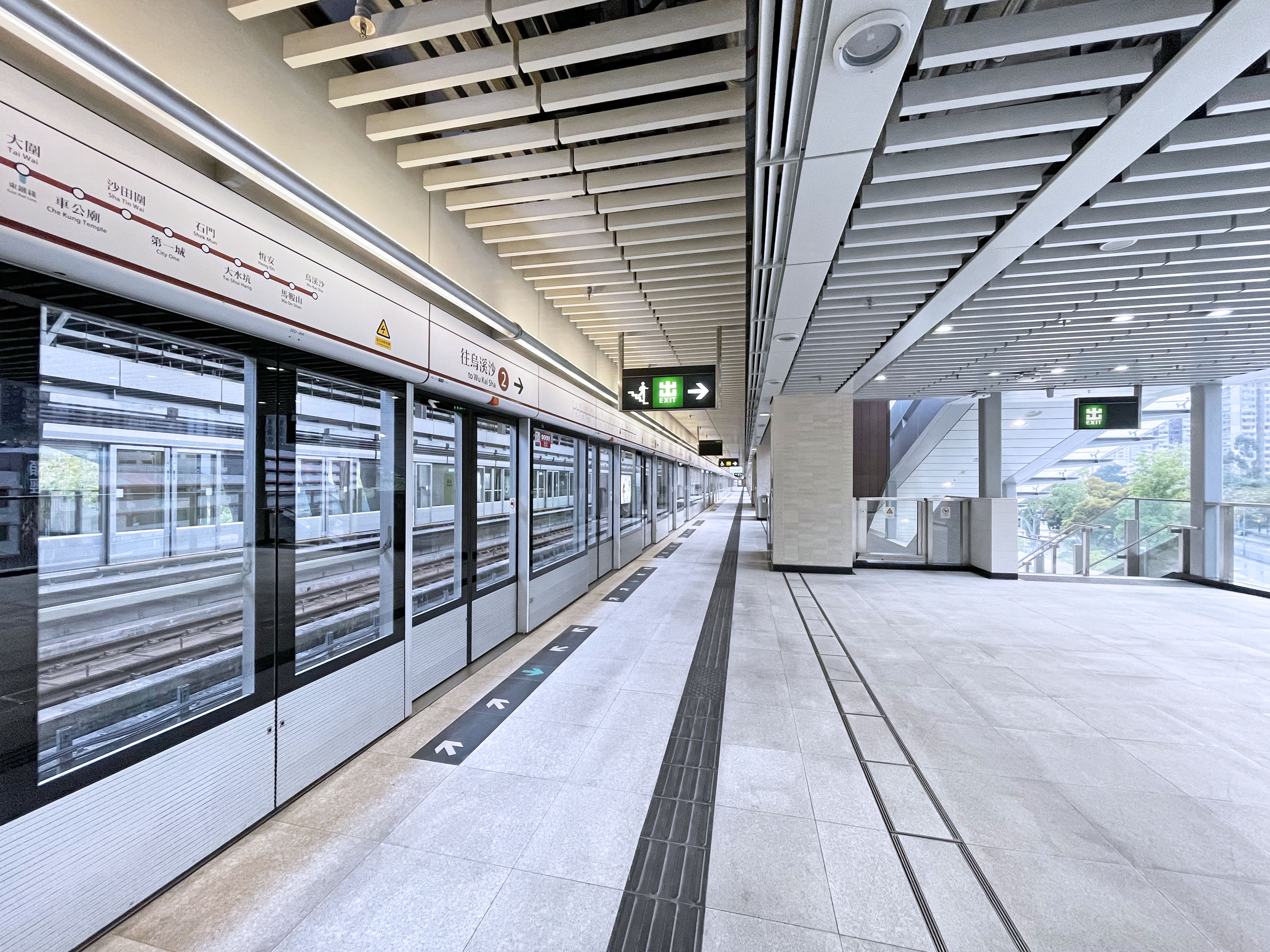
- Platform 2 (April 2022)

Chinese name
- Chinese: 顯徑
- Simplified Chinese: 显径
- Cantonese Yale: Híngīng
- Literal meaning: Show Path
Transcriptions
Standard Mandarin
- Hanyu Pinyin: Xiǎnjìng
Yue: Cantonese
- Yale Romanization: Híngīng
- Jyutping: hin2ging3

General information
- Location: Che Kung Miu Road and Hin Keng Street, Tai Wai; Sha Tin, Hong Kong
- Coordinates: 22°21′50″N 114°10′15″E
- System: MTR rapid transit station
- Owner: MTR Corporation
- Operator: MTR Corporation
- Line: Tuen Ma line
- Platforms: 2 (2 side platforms)
- Tracks: 2

Construction
- Structure type: Elevated
- Accessible: Yes

Other information
- Station code: HIK

History
- Opened: 14 February 2020; 6 years ago

Services
Preceding station	MTR	Following station
Diamond Hill towards Tuen Mun	Tuen Ma line	Tai Wai towards Wu Kai Sha
Route map
Location
- Location within MTR

Hin Keng (Chinese: 顯徑; lit. 'Show Path') is a station on the Tuen Ma line, part of the MTR rapid transit network in Hong Kong. It opened on 14 February 2020 as part of the Tuen Ma line's first phase. It was built as part of the Sha Tin to Central Link project. The station is located near Hin Keng Estate in Tai Wai, Sha Tin, New Territories. It is an elevated station with one entrance facing Che Kung Miu Road.

The station is next to the Lion Rock Tunnel, which is on the other end of the station and also nearby the Beacon Hill Tunnel on the East Rail line connecting Tai Wai and Kowloon Tong.

== History ==
The station was built on the site of the New Territories South Animal Management Centre and Shatin Plant Quarantine Station, facilities of the Agriculture, Fisheries and Conservation Department, which were relocated to a new facility on To Shek Street (多石街) in November 2013.

The station and approach structures were built under MTR contract number 1102. Worth HK$1.039 billion, the contract was awarded to Japanese construction firm Penta-Ocean on 5 July 2013. Major sub-contractors employed on the project include Hong Kong company Ngai Shun Construction & Drilling Company as well as the Chinese state-owned China Geo-Engineering Corporation. The architect was Hong Kong-based Leigh and Orange. Construction of Hin Keng station began with a ceremony on 13 November that year.

A topping-out ceremony for the station was held on 30 April 2015, making Hin Keng the first station on the Sha Tin to Central Link to be topped out. The station opened on 14 February 2020 as part of the Ma On Shan line south extension to Kai Tak, also known as Tuen Ma Line Phase 1. It became part of the Tuen Ma line when the Ma On Shan line was merged with the West Rail line.

Since then, Hin Keng station received numerous awards. In 2023, it was the first station in the world to have a "Excellent" rating by UK's BREEAM scheme. In 2026, it has also received the UITP Impact Award under the title of "MTR 1st Green Railway Station".

== Design ==
Hin Keng station is an elevated station with an open design that allows for natural lighting and ventilation, reducing energy consumption and air-conditioning costs. Both the concourse and platform levels are designed to promote cross ventilation, intended to achieve comfortable thermal conditions without the use of air conditioning. Computerised fluid dynamics analyses were carried out to inform this design. In addition, architectural fins on the station's exterior are provided to reduce solar thermal gain.

The station has a green roof of approximately 5,000 m^{2} (54,000 sq ft), which is designed to sustain vegetation growth with less irrigation and maintenance requirements than traditional green roof systems. The green roof, as well as the use of wood and other brown-coloured materials in the station design, was intended to visually blend the station into the surrounding environment (it is adjacent to a wooded hillside).

The glass canopies on the station exterior, which provide protection from the elements, double as artworks. (Sunshine on our Quilt) They incorporate a colourful design resembling a patchwork quilt, which was designed by Hong Kong artist Ng Ka-chun and Hin Keng Estate residents.

== Station layout ==
U2; Platforms
U2; Platforms	Side platform, doors will open on the right
U2; Platforms	Platform 1	← Tuen Ma line towards Tuen Mun (Diamond Hill)
U2; Platforms	Platform 2	Tuen Ma line towards Wu Kai Sha (Tai Wai) →
U2; Platforms	Side platform, doors will open on the right
G	Concourse	Exits, shops, washrooms
G	Concourse	Customer service

=== Entrances/exits ===
- A: Po Lam Station

== Gallery ==
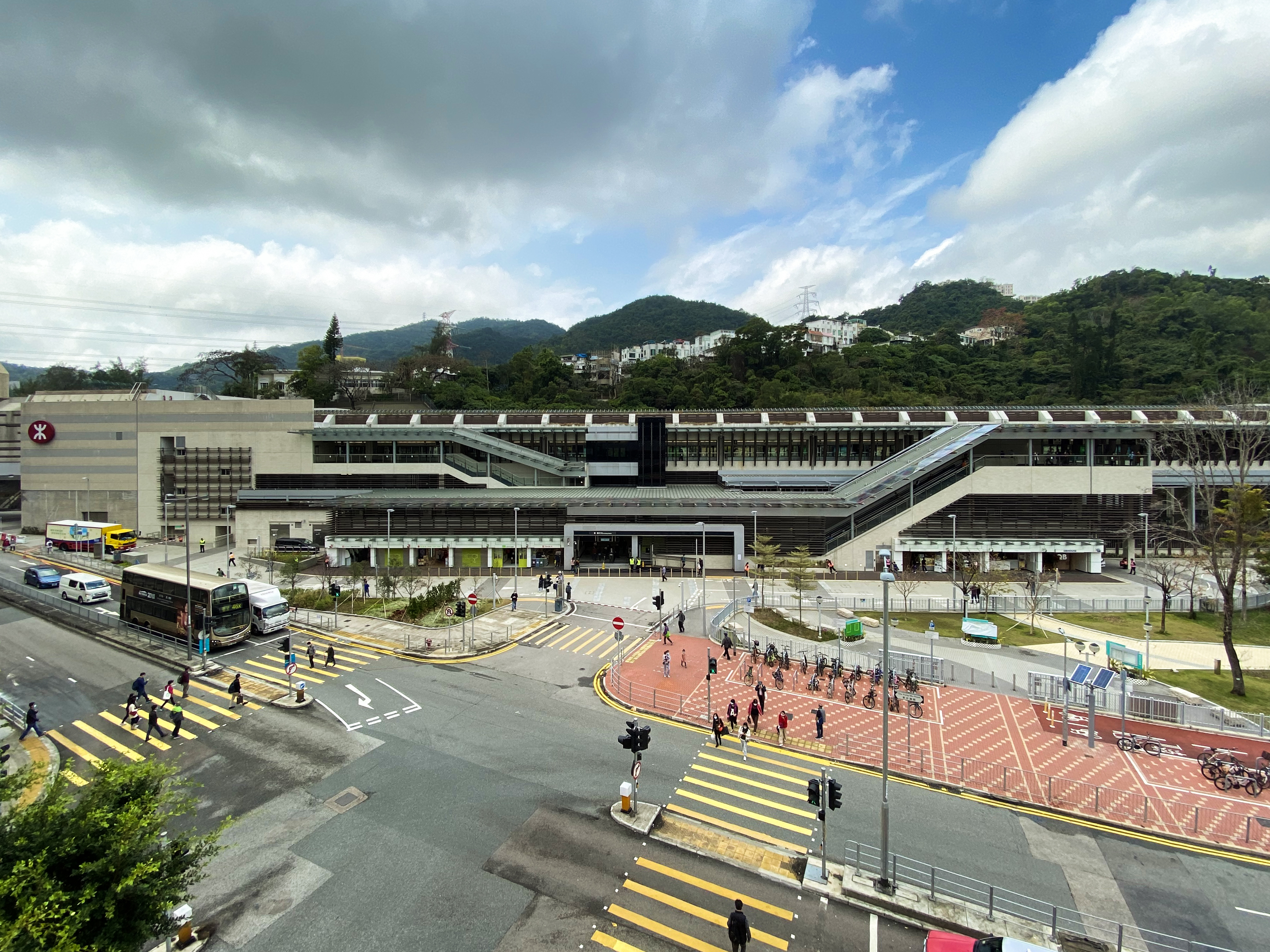
Exterior (February 2020)

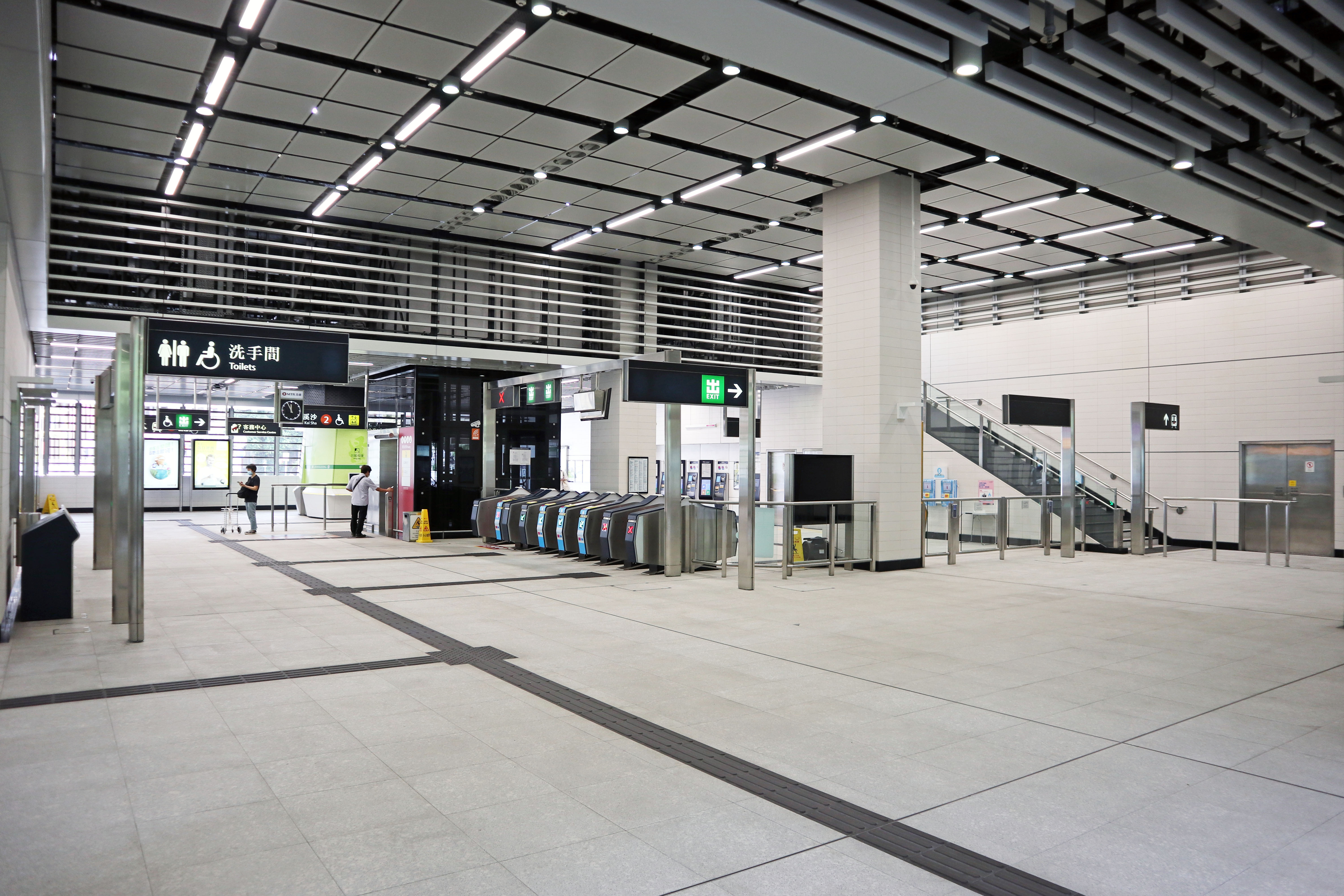
Concourse

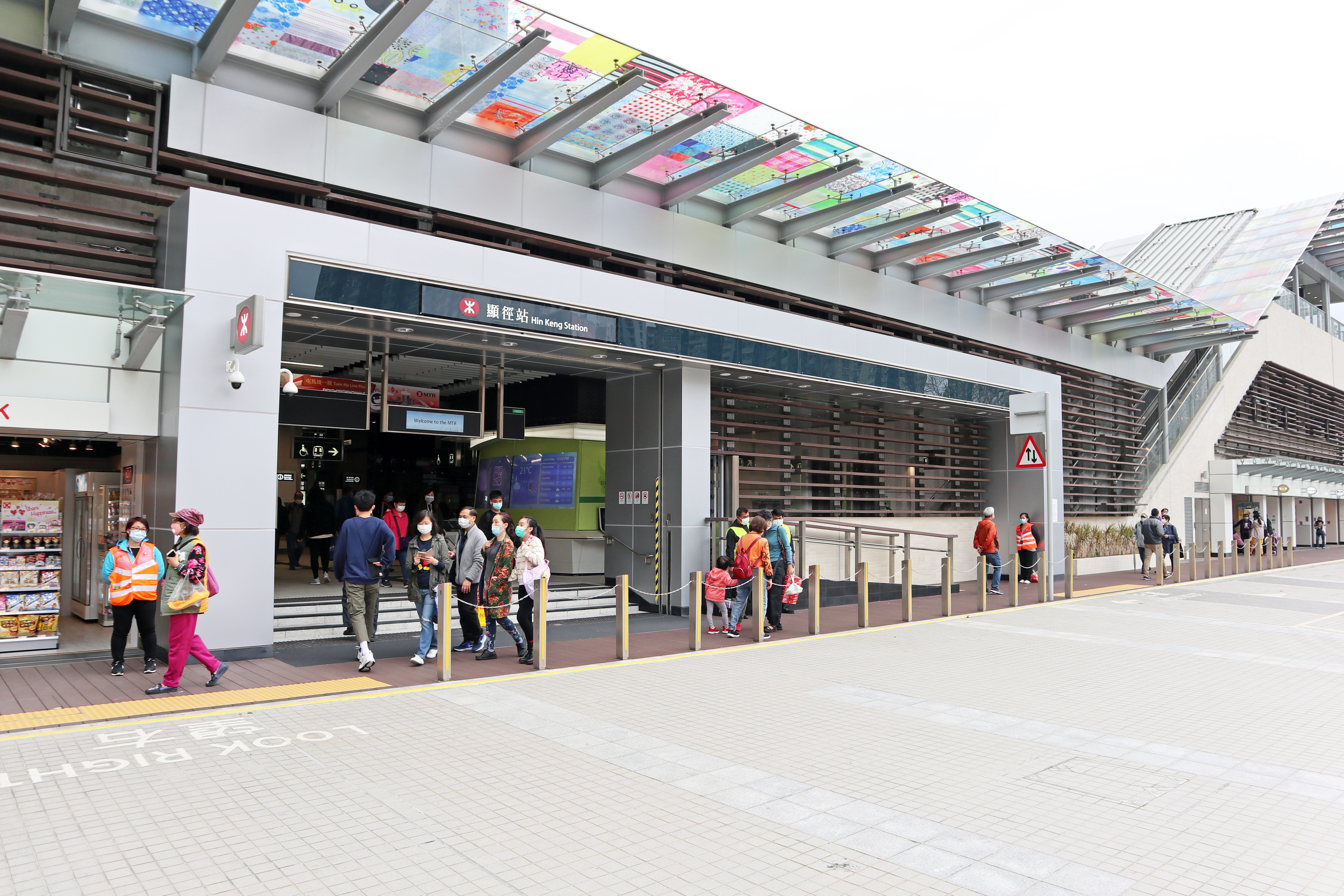
Exit
