= Chun Fung (constituency) =

Hong Kong constituency

- Elected constituency for the Sha Tin District Council
- Boundary of Chun Fung in Sha Tin District
- District: Sha Tin
- Legislative Council constituency: New Territories North East
- Population: 15,529 (2019)
- Electorate: 9,477 (2019)

Current constituency
- Created: 2003
- Number of members: One
- Member: Vacant

Chun Fung
- Traditional Chinese: 秦豐
Transcriptions
Yue: Cantonese
- Yale Romanization: Chèuhn fūng
- Jyutping: Coen4 fung1

Chun Fung is one of the 36 constituencies of the Sha Tin District Council. The seat elects one member of the council every four years. The constituency has an estimated population of 15,529.

== Councillors represented ==
Election	Member	Party
2003	Leung Chi-kin	Civil Force
2007	Leung Chi-kin	Civil Force
2011	Chan Nok-hang→Vacant	Democratic
2015	Chan Nok-hang→Vacant	Democratic→Independent→Civic
2019	Chan Nok-hang→Vacant	Civic→Community Sha Tin→Independent

== Election results ==
=== 2010s ===
Sha Tin District Council Election, 2019: Chun Fung
Party	Candidate	Votes	%	±%
Civic	Chan Nok-hang	4,732	68.10	
Civil Force	Peter Ngai Chi-wai	2,174	31.29	
Nonpartisan	Lee Sze-wing	43	0.62	
Majority		2,558	36.81	
Turnout		6,994	73.81	
Civic hold		Swing		
