= Kau Yeuk (Sha Tin) =

The Nine Alliances of Lek Yuen or Kau Yeuk (Chinese: 九約; lit. 'Alliance of Nine') was a regional organization of various groups in Sha Tin Valley, Hong Kong.

== Alliances ==
The nine groups were:

- Tai Wai Yeuk (大圍約): Chik Chuen Wai (積存圍)
- Tin Sam Yeuk (田心約): Tin Sam Wai (田心圍), San Tin (新田)
- Keng Hau Yeuk (徑口約): Sheung Keng Hau (上徑口), Ha Keng Hau (下徑口), Hin Tin (顯田)
- Pai Tau Yeuk (排頭約): Pai Tau (排頭), Sheung Wo Che (上禾輋), Ha Wo Che (下禾輋), Tung Lo Wan (銅鑼灣)
- Kak Tin Yeuk (隔田約): Kak Tin (隔田), Shan Ha Wai (山廈圍)
- Fo Tan Yeuk (火炭約): Fo Tan (火炭), Pat Tsz Wo (拔子窩), Lok Lo Ha (落路下), Ho Lek Pui (河瀝背), Kau To (九肚), Shek Lau Tung (石榴洞), Shan Mei (山尾), Wong Chuk Yeung (黃竹洋), Cheung Lek Mei (長瀝尾), Au Pui Wan (凹背灣), Kwai Tei (龜地), Wo Liu Hang (禾寮坑), Chek Nai Ping (赤泥坪), Ma Niu (馬料)
- Sha Tin Tau Yeuk (沙田頭約): Sha Tin Tau (沙田頭), Tsok Pok Hang (作壆坑)
- Sha Tin Wai Yeuk (沙田圍約): Sha Tin Wai (沙田圍), To Shek (多石), Fui Yiu Ha (灰窰下), Mau Tat (茅笪), Yuen Chau Kok (圓洲角), Wong Uk (王屋), Tse Uk (謝屋)
- Siu Lek Yuen Yeuk (小瀝源約): Siu Lek Yuen (小瀝源), Chap Wai Kon (插桅杆), Shap Yi Wat (十二笏), Ngau Pei Sha (牛皮沙), Tai Lam Liu (大藍寮), Shek Kwu Lung (石古壟), Wong Nai Tau (黃泥頭), Kwun Yam Shan (觀音山), Fu Yung Pit (芙蓉別), Mau Tso Ngam (茂草岩), Lo Shue Tin (老鼠田), Nam Shan (南山), Fa Sam Hang (花心坑), Mui Tsz Lam (梅子林)

== History ==
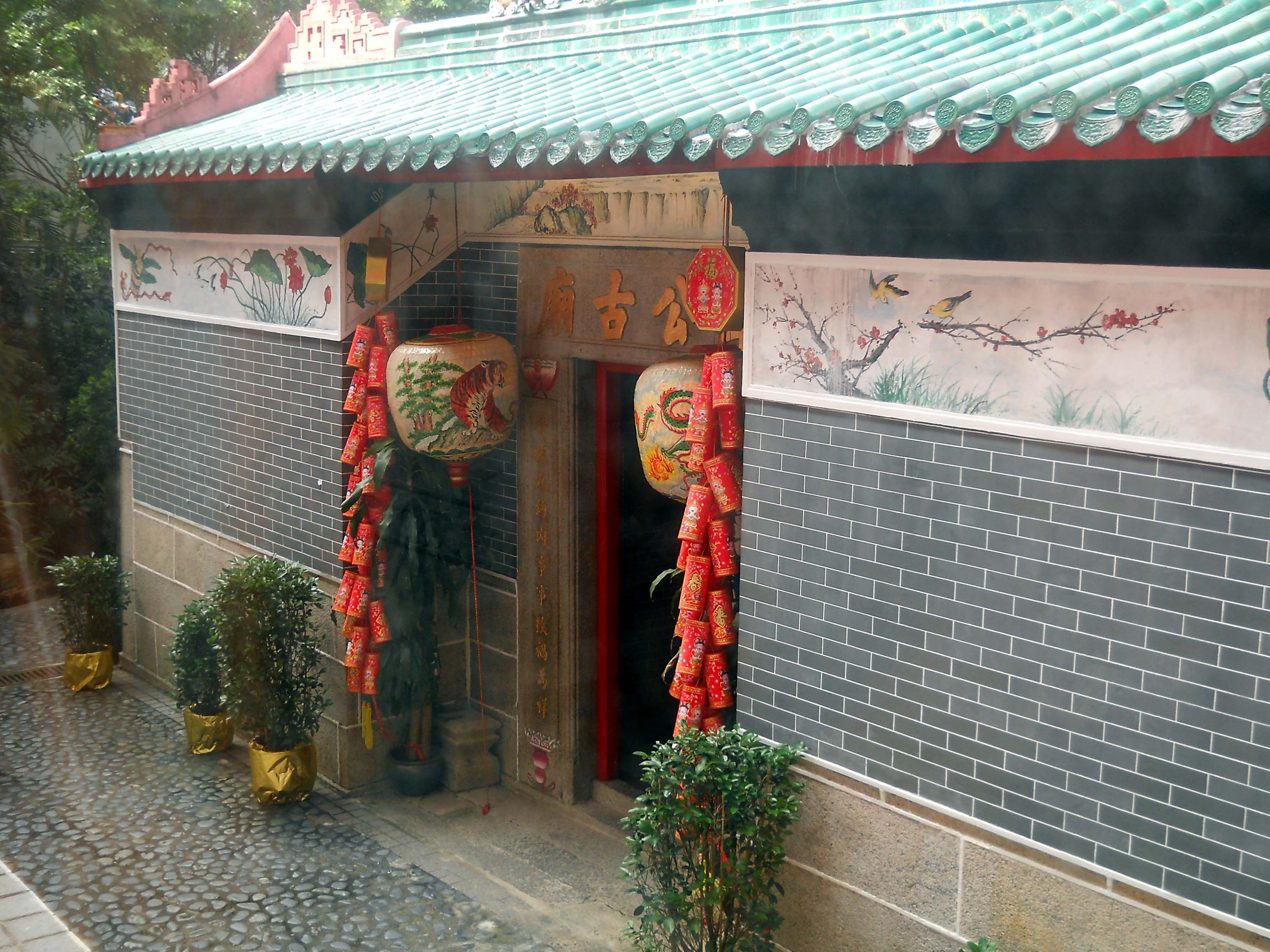
The original temple, located within the Che Kung Temple complex in Tai Wai. The characters 九約 appear in the couplet on the doorway of the main entrance (left side visible on the picture).

The Che Kung Temple near San Tin Wai village in the Tai Wai area was built and initially managed by Tin Sam village. The village lost its managerial rights in the late 19th century as a consequence of a dispute against the Kau Yeuk that was settled in a lawsuit at the yamen.

The Kau Yeuk had provided evidence that it made significant contributions to the renovation of the temple. The Kau Yeuk could prove its case by referring to the rhymed couplets that were inscribed on both sides of the main entrance and that bore its name.

The temple was subsequently jointly managed by nine villages of Sha Tin, while Tin Sam Village continued to enjoy some privileges in the worship of Che Kung. Since 1936, the temple has been administered by the Chinese Temples Committee.

== See also ==
- Tai Po Tsat Yeuk
