= Shek Kwu Lung =

Shek Kwu Lung (Chinese: 石古壟) is the name of two villages in Hong Kong:

- Shek Kwu Lung (Sha Tin District) in Siu Lek Yuen, Sha Tin District
- Shek Kwu Lung (Tai Po District) in Tai Po District
