= Kak Tin =

Village in Hong Kong

Coordinates: 22.367575°N 114.183386°E

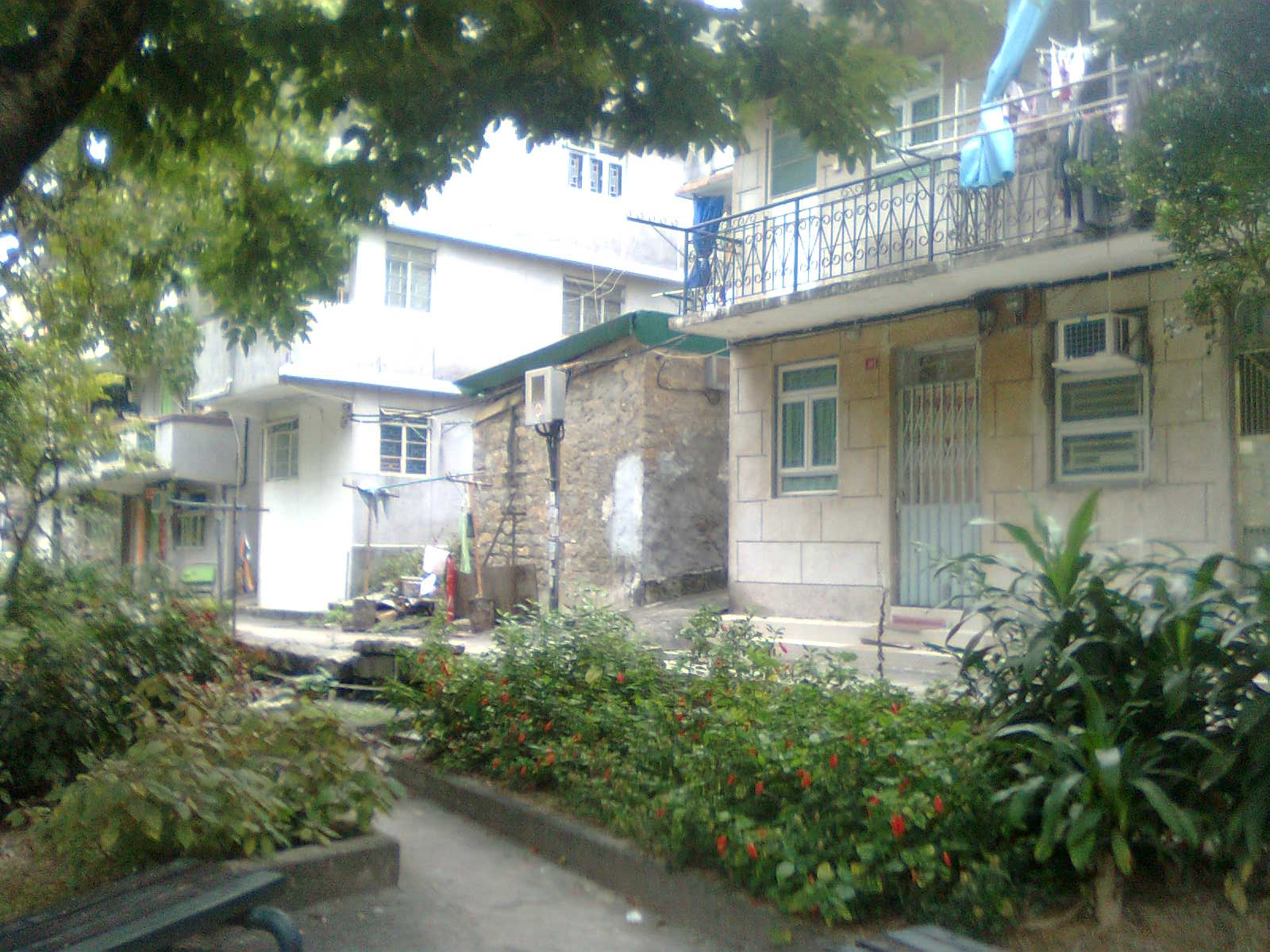
Kak Tin in 2012.

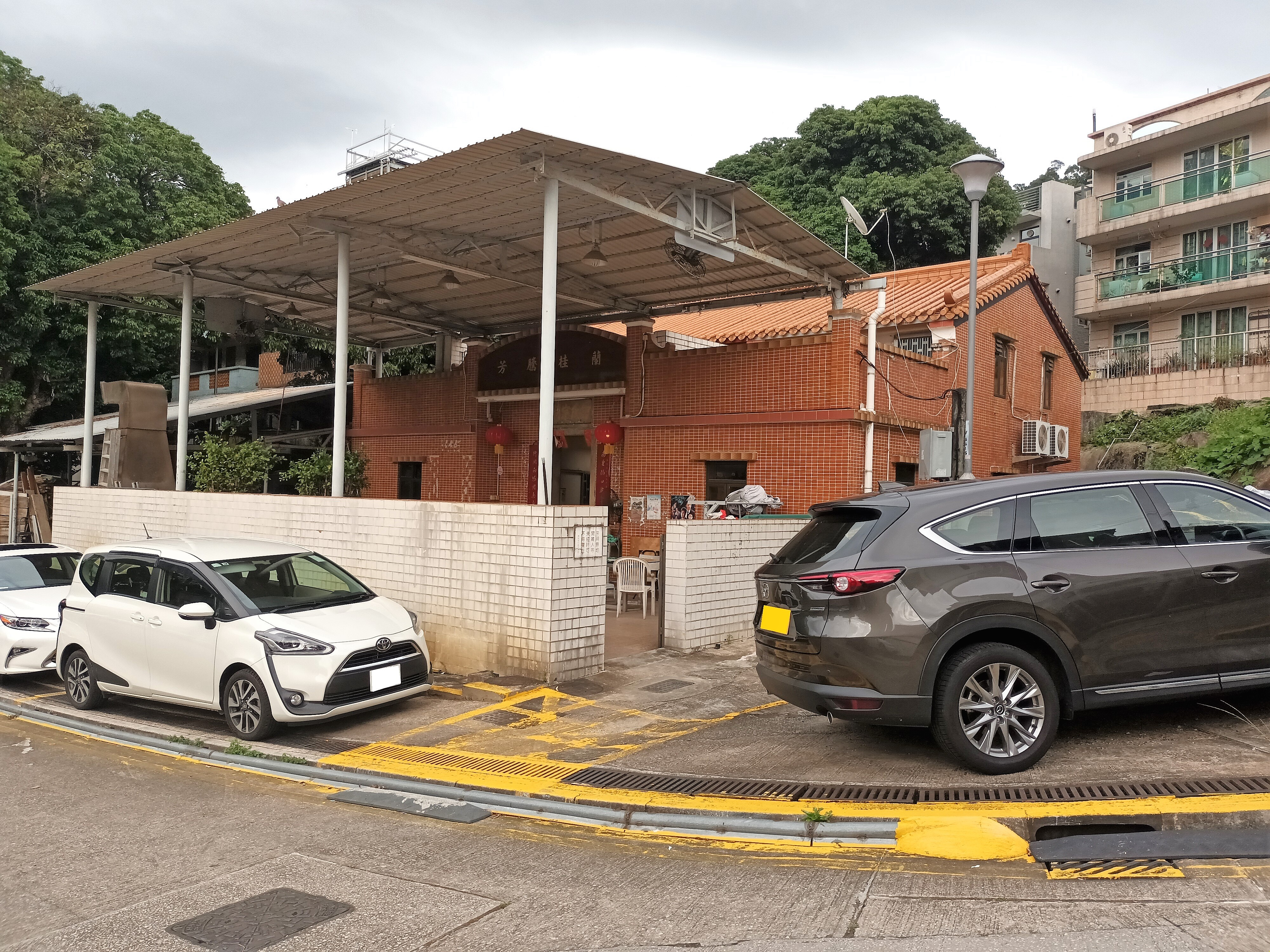
Tsang Ancestral Hall in Kak Tin in 2022.

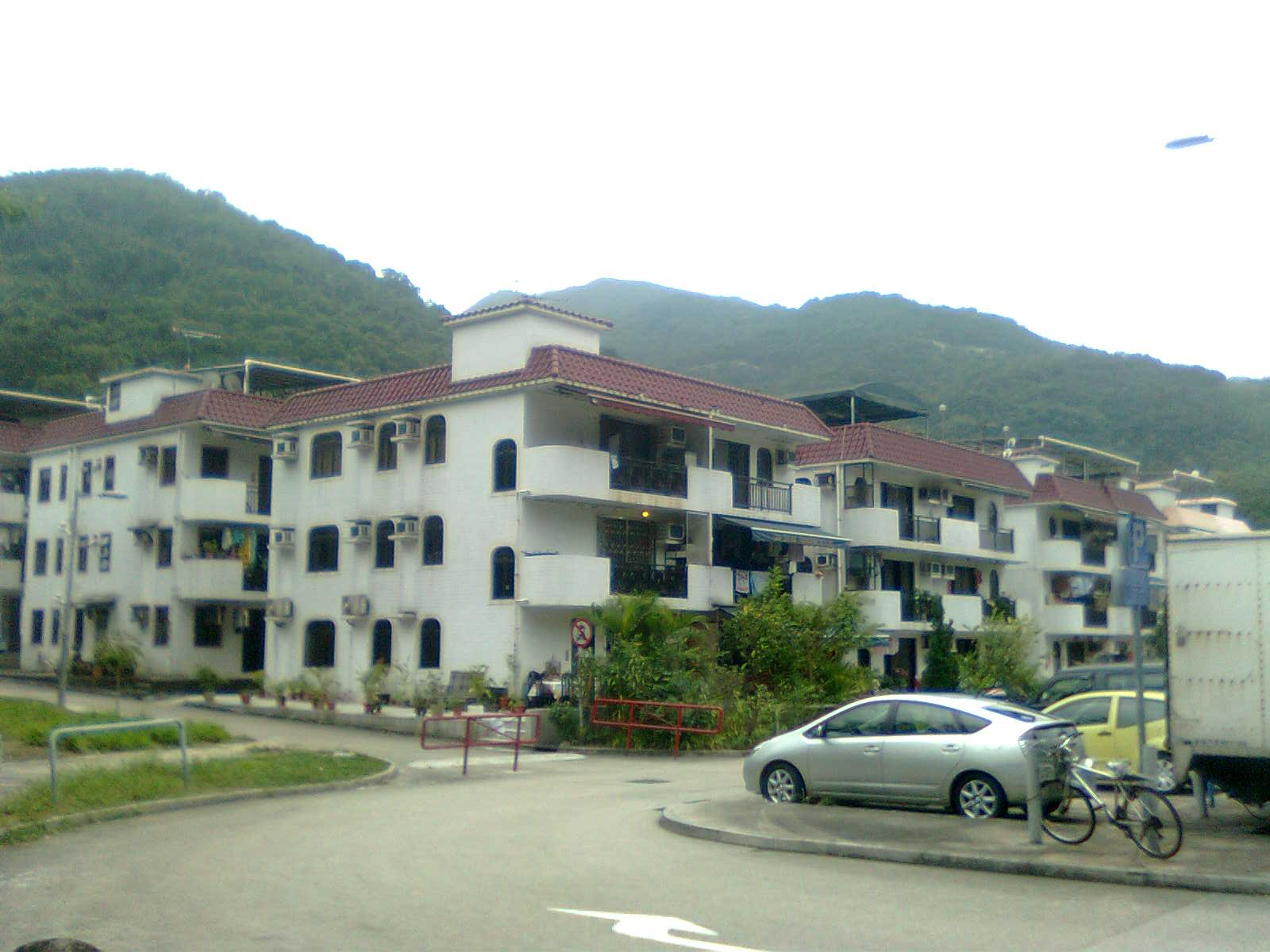
Modern New Territories small houses in Kak Tin in 2012.

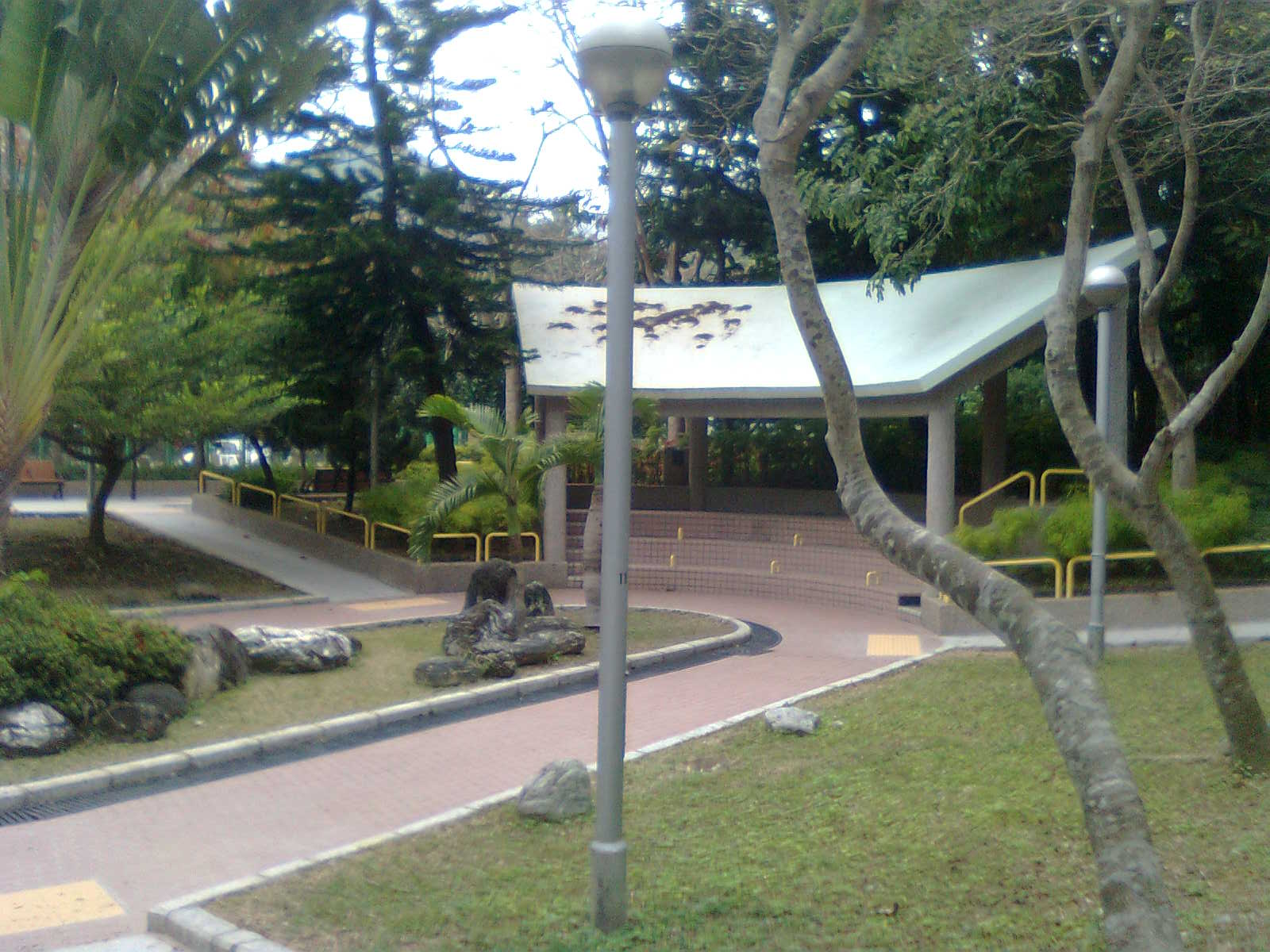
Kak Tin Playground in 2012.

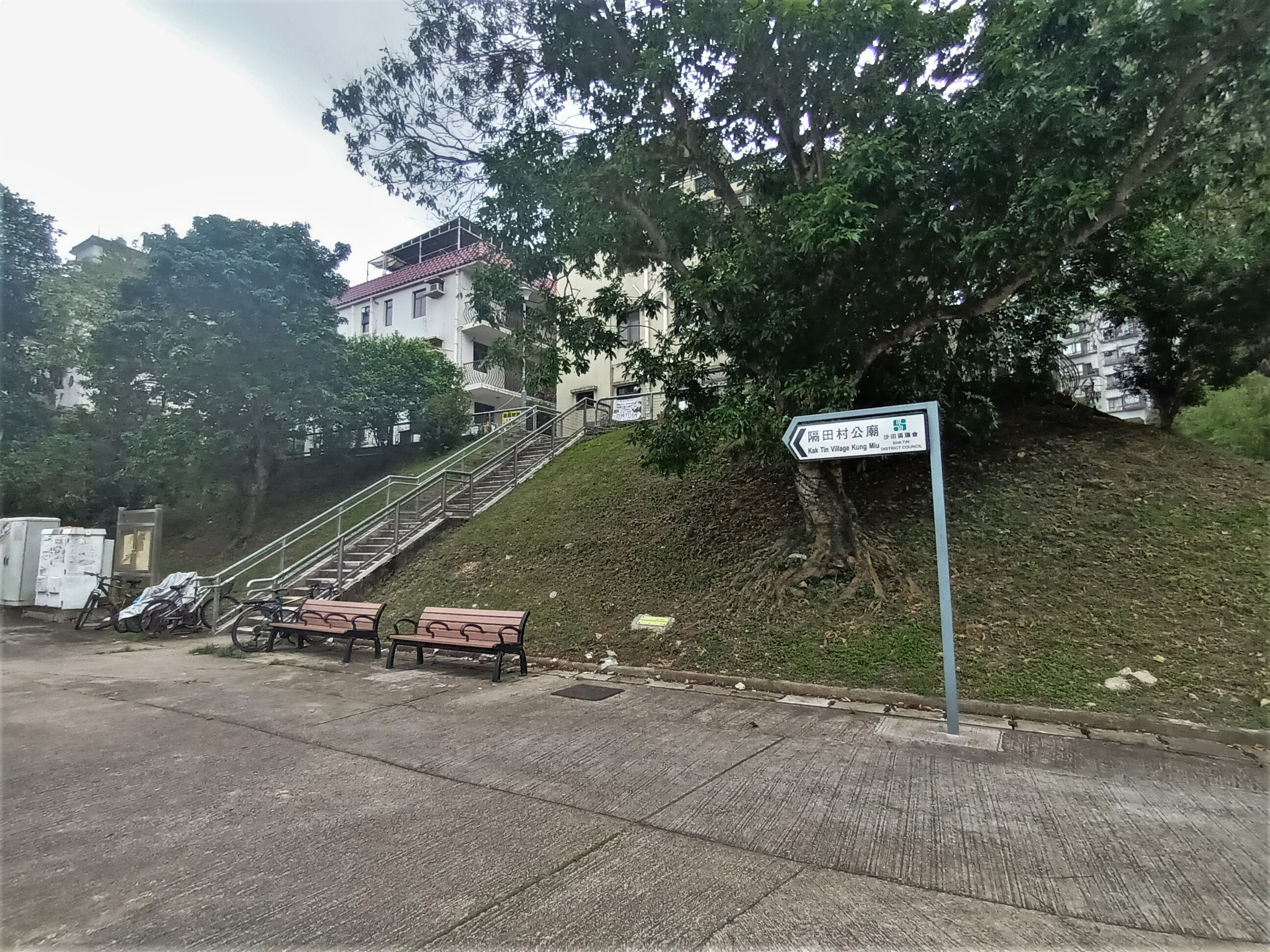
Kak Tin Village Kung Miu in 2022.

Kak Tin (Chinese: 隔田) is a village in the Tai Wai area of Sha Tin District, Hong Kong. By extension, the area around the village is also called Kak Tin.

== Location ==
Kak Tin village is located south of Sun Chui Estate and Sun Tin Wai Estate. It is at the south of Shing Mun River and at the foot of Lion Rock.

== Administration ==
Kak Tin and Kak Tin Kung Mui are recognized villages under the New Territories Small House Policy.

== History ==
Kak Tin was one of the five Punti villages in Sha Tin founded about 400 years ago by Tsang (曾) clanspeople, originally from Shandong. The first ancestor Tsang Nam-hin (曾南軒) moved to Shipai in Dongguan, Guangdong province. He later moved to the Sha Tin area, first in Tai Wai, then in Tin Sam, and finally settled in Kak Tin in the late Ming dynasty (1368–1644).

The villagers were historically farmers engaged in rice and vegetable growing supported by pig and poultry rearing. The village had a population of 130 in 1899, 200 (including 92 males) in 1911 and 220 in 1960.

Kak Tin Tsuen Kung Miu or Kak Tin Village Kung Miu (隔田村公廟) is a small settlement located next to Kak Tin. It comprises 16 three-storey houses built by the Government to resettle the villagers of Kung Miu affected by the development of Sha Tin New Town.

== Kak Tin today ==
About 80 households of the Tsangs are still residing in the village.

Most of the village houses have been demolished and replaced by modern small houses. No. 11 Kak Tin Village Third Street was listed as a Grade III historic building in 2010 and the listing of No. 12 as Grade III historic building was proposed. They were built in the 1920s-1930s. Both buildings were demolished as of May 2020.

== See also ==
- Kau Yeuk (Sha Tin)
- San Tin Village
