= Shek Kwu Lung (Sha Tin District) =

Village in Hong Kong

Coordinates: 22.383728°N 114.218849°E

Shek Kwu Lung (Chinese: 石古壟) is a village in the Siu Lek Yuen area of Sha Tin District, Hong Kong.

== Administration ==
Shek Kwu Lung is a recognized village under the New Territories Small House Policy. It is one of the villages represented within the Sha Tin Rural Committee. For electoral purposes, Shek Kwu Lung is part of the Kwong Hong constituency, which was formerly represented by Ricardo Liao Pak-hong until July 2021.

== History ==
At the time of the 1911 census, the population of Shek Kwu Lung was 55. The number of males was 18.

== See also ==
- Kau Yeuk (Sha Tin)
