= Nam Shan (Sha Tin District) =

Village in Sha Tin District, Hong Kong

Coordinates: 22.38513°N 114.217913°E

Nam Shan (Chinese: 南山) is a village in the Siu Lek Yuen area of Sha Tin District, Hong Kong.

== Administration ==
Nam Shan is a recognised village under the New Territories Small House Policy. It is one of the villages represented within the Sha Tin Rural Committee. For electoral purposes, Nam Shan is part of the Kwong Hong constituency, which was formerly represented by Ricardo Liao Pak-hong until July 2021.
