= Tai Wai Village =

Walled village in Sha Tin District, Hong Kong

Coordinates: 22.375674°N 114.178627°E

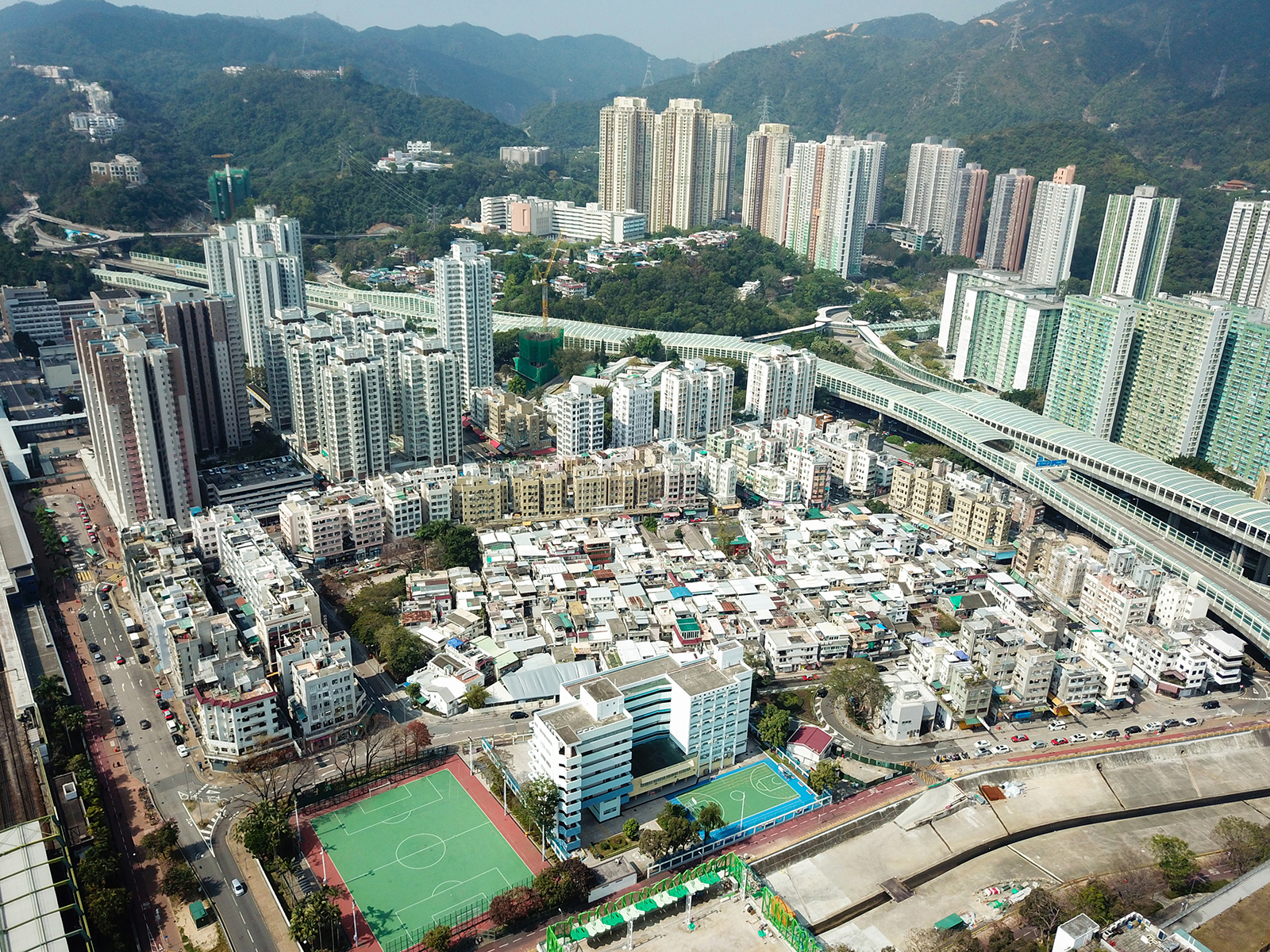
Aerial view of Tai Wai Village, surrounded by some of the modern developments of Tai Wai.

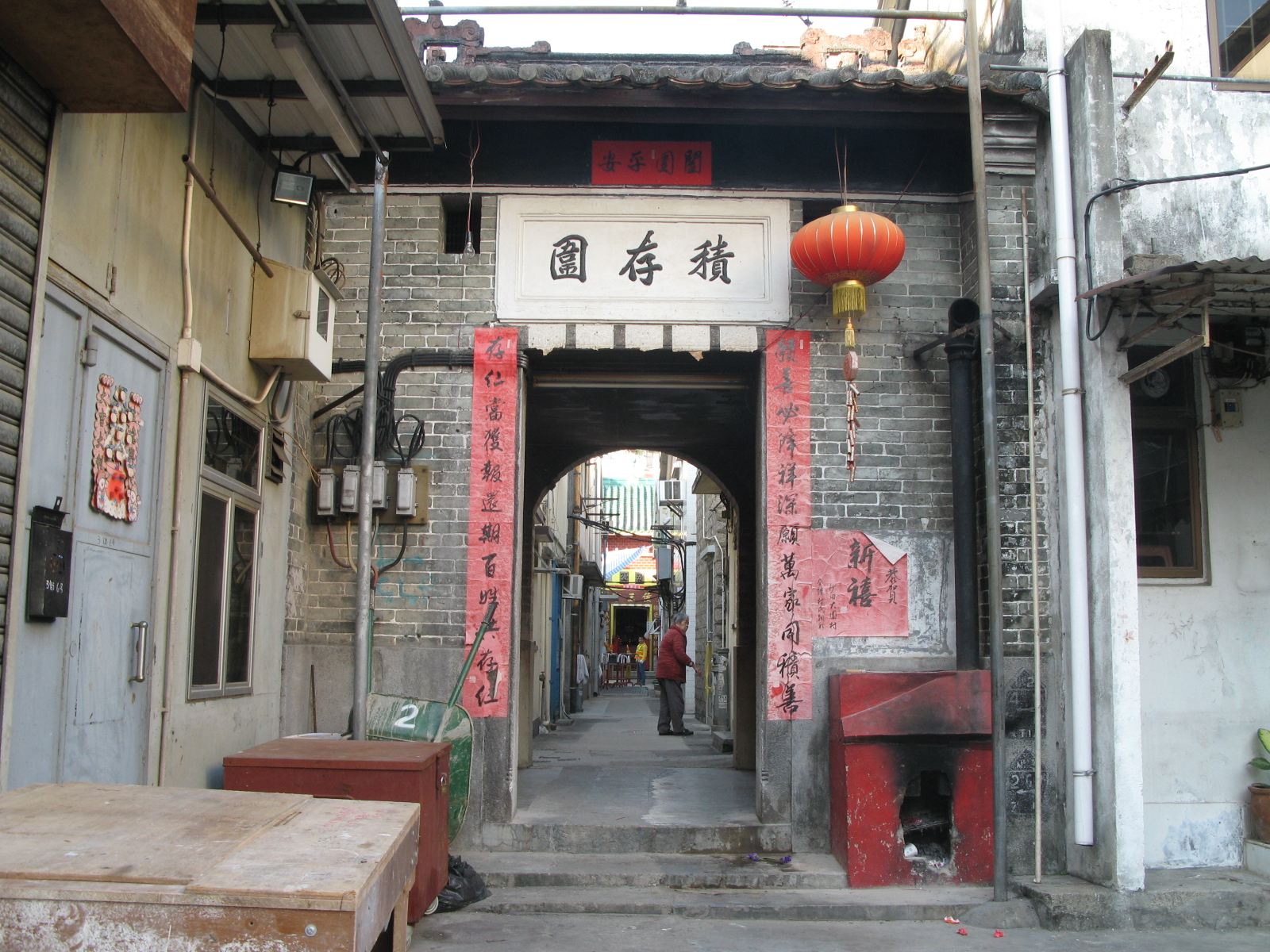
Entrance gate of Tai Wai Village.

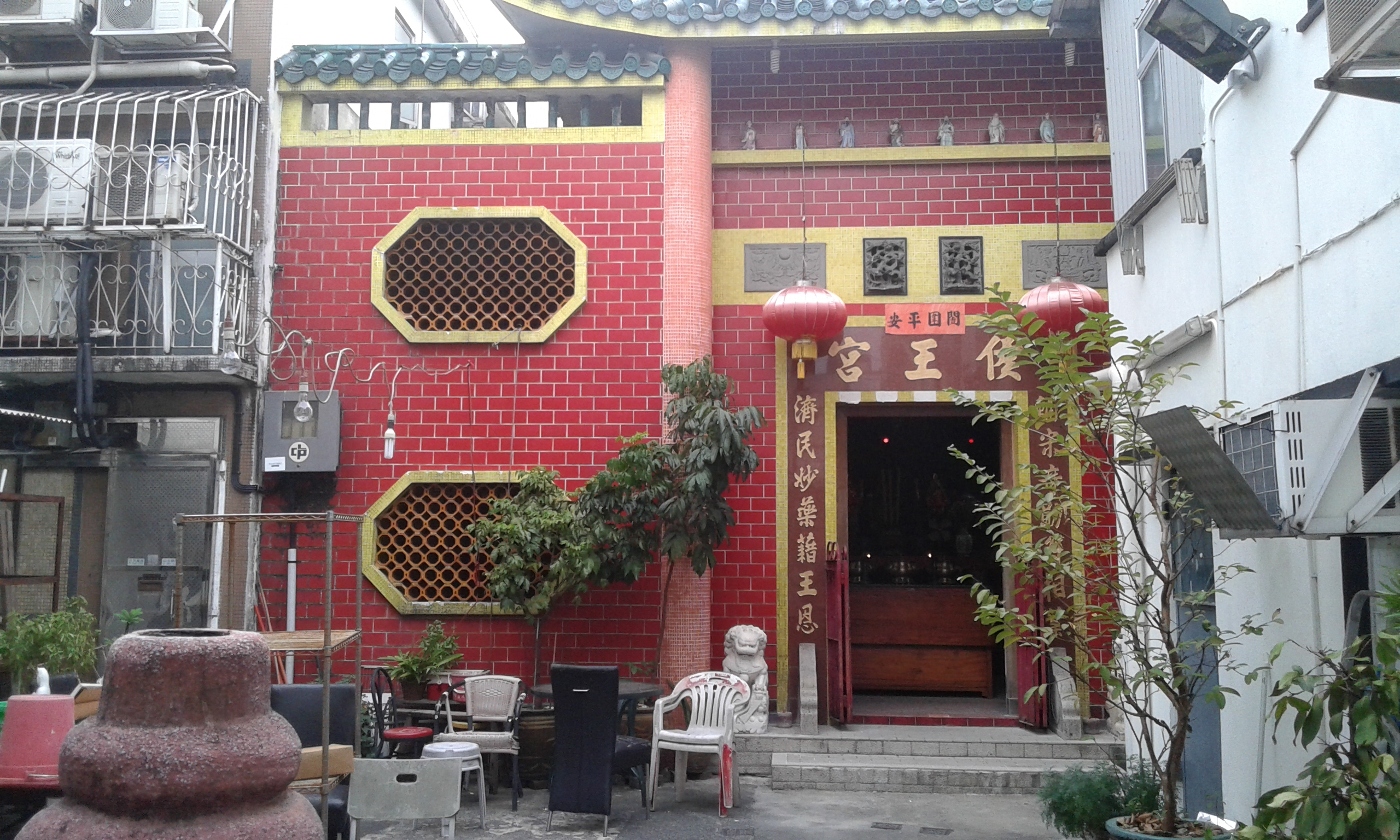
Hau Wong Temple within Tai Wai Village.

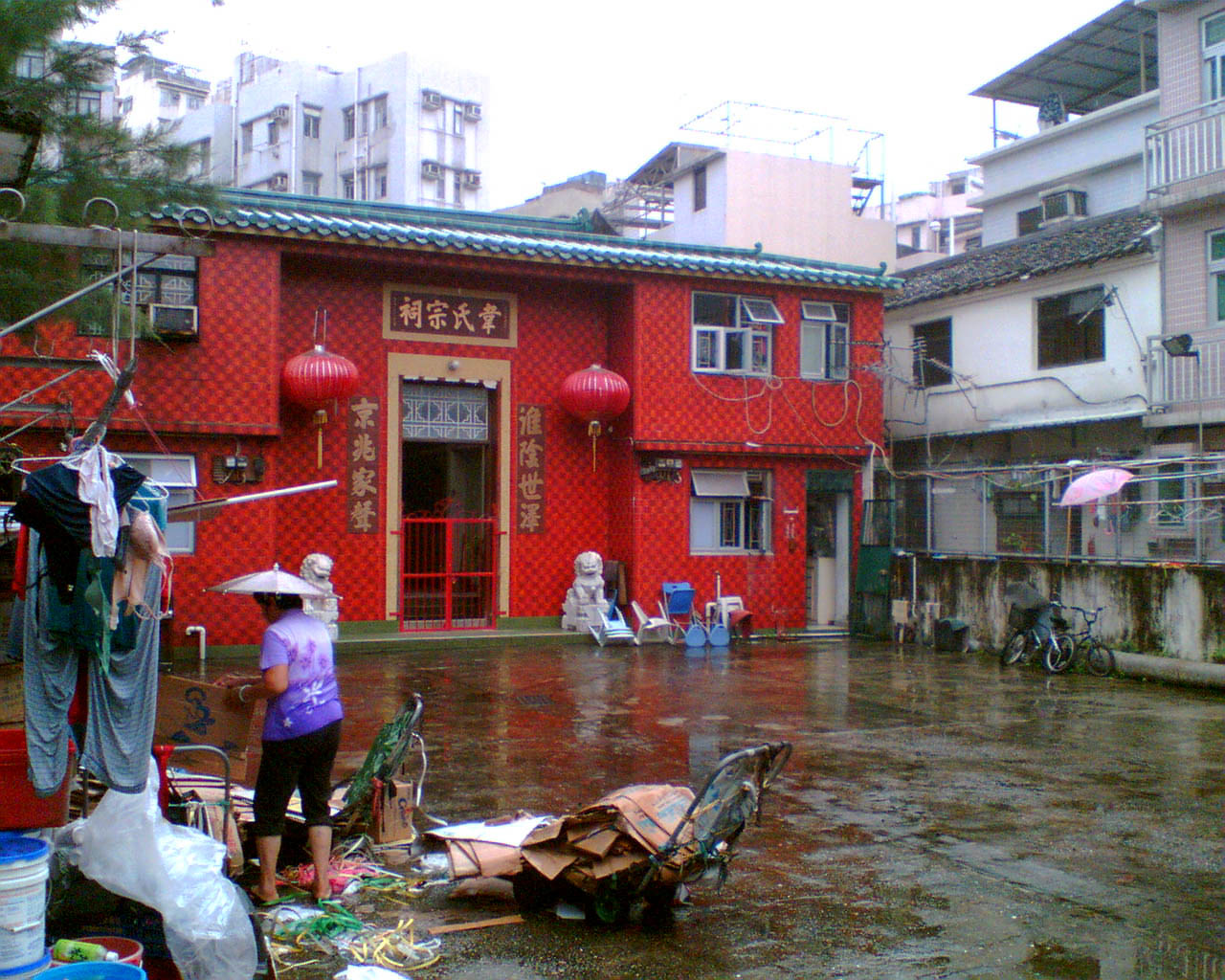
Wai ancestral hall within Tai Wai Village.

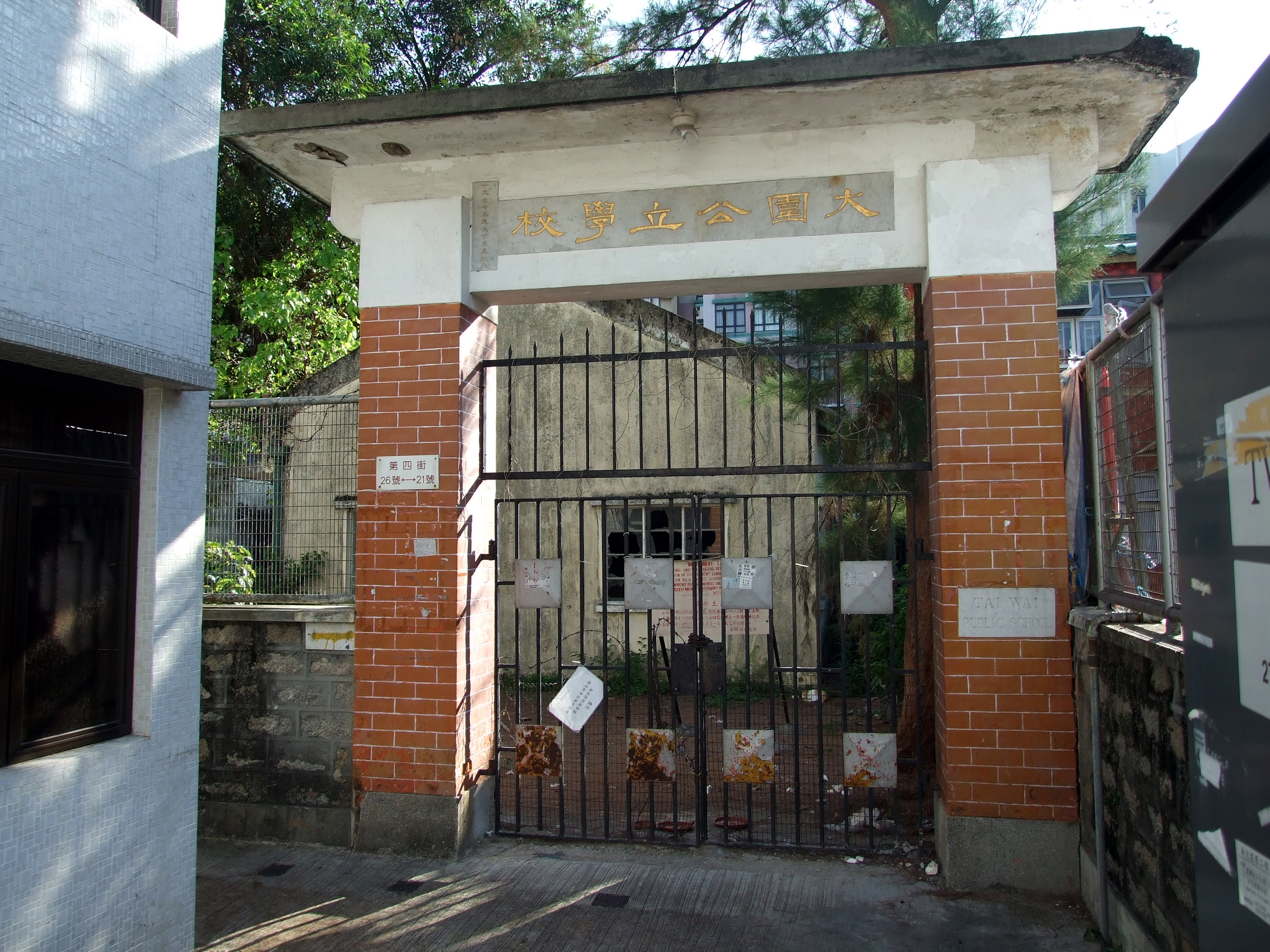
Former Tai Wai Public School in Tai Wai Village.

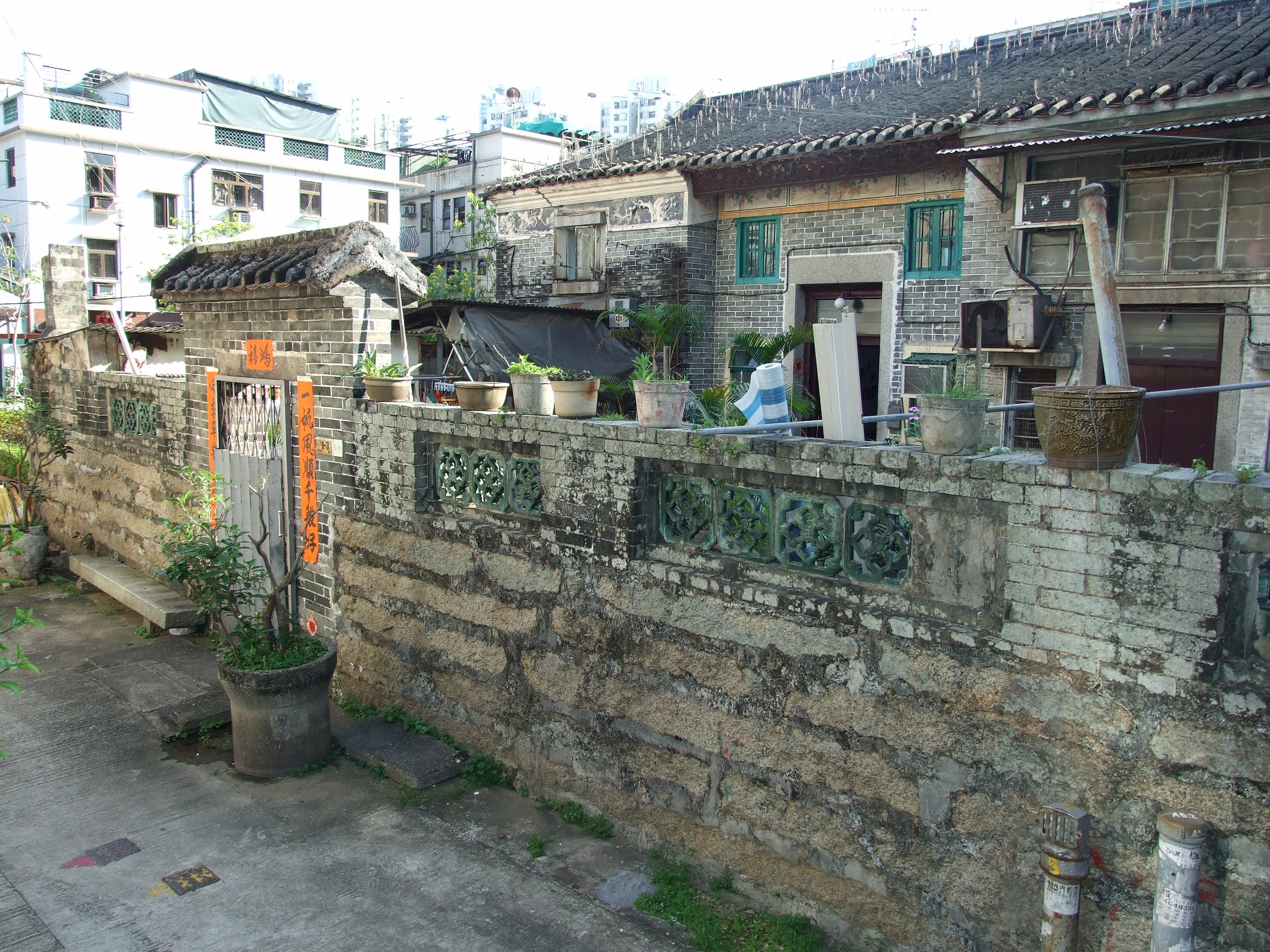
Old houses at Nos. 1, 2 and 3 First Street, Tai Wai.

Tai Wai Village (Chinese: 大圍村), also known as Chik Chuen Wai (積存圍), is a walled village in the Tai Wai area of Sha Tin District, Hong Kong.

== Location ==
Tai Wai Village is located next to Tai Wai station and the main commercial streets of the Tai Wai area.

== Administration ==
Tai Wai Village is a recognized village under the New Territories Small House Policy.

== History ==
Tai Wai Village, where the name of the area came from, was the largest and oldest walled village in Sha Tin. It was built in 1574 during the Ming dynasty, and was called Chik Chuen Wai (積存圍) at the time. It was originally made up of 16 families, Wai (韋), Chan (陳), Ng (吳), Yeung (楊), Wong (黃), Lee (李), Hui (許), Cheng (鄭), Tong (唐), Yuen (袁), Yau (游), Lam (林), Lok (駱), Tam (譚), Mok (莫) and Choy (蔡).

The Wai family, being the largest family, is thought to be the direct descendants of the famous founder general of the Han dynasty, Han Xin, who purportedly fled there to escape executions ordered by Emperor Gao of Han's empress Empress Lü Zhi. The Han descendants changed their surname into Wai by splitting the word Hon (韓) in two halves and took up the character on the right hand side.

The Cheng family, on the other hand, originated from a place called Xingyang in Zhengzhou, Henan which is the place where Chang'e supposedly flew to the Moon. It is also the birthplace of Li Shangyin, one of the most famous poets in the late Tang dynasty.

Tai Wai was mentioned in the 1688 Xinan gazeeter and it appears on the "Map of the San-On District" published in 1866 by Simeone Volonteri.

At the time of the 1911 census, the population of Tai Wai Village was 350. The number of males was 164.

== Features ==
The village was walled to protect the villagers from bandits, pirates and/or unfriendly neighbours. It was rectangular in shape with 4 watch towers at its four corners. The towers and the walls have long been demolished leaving only the entrance gate and part of the front wall. The houses inside the walls are in rows, and many houses have been built outside the walls due to later development. Historic and traditional buildings include the Entrance Gate, a Hau Wong Temple, the Wai Ancestral Hall and several old houses.

The Entrance Gate is listed as a Grade II historic building.

A Hau Wong Temple is located within Tai Wai Village. Originally sited outside the walled village, it was moved inside during the reign of Xianfeng (1850–1861). The current temple has replaced an earlier temple, probably built in 1884 and demolished in 1982.

The Wai Ancestral Hall was built in the 18th or 19th century, outside of the village walls.

The houses at Nos. 1, 2 and 3 First Street are listed as Grade III historic buildings.

== See also ==
- Kau Yeuk (Sha Tin)
- Tin Sam Tsuen, Sha Tin District, another walled village in the Tai Wai area
