= Au Pui Wan =

Village in Hong Kong

Coordinates: 22.407251°N 114.174811°E

Au Pui Wan (Chinese: 坳背灣) is a village in the Fo Tan area of Sha Tin District, Hong Kong. Is it located southeast of Grassy Hill.

== Administration ==
Au Pui Wan is a recognized village under the New Territories Small House Policy. It is one of the villages represented within the Sha Tin Rural Committee. For electoral purposes, Au Pui Wan is part of the Fo Tan constituency, which is currently represented by Lui Kai-wing.

== See also ==
- Kau Yeuk (Sha Tin)
- San Tin Village
