= Wo Che =

Village and area in Hong Kong

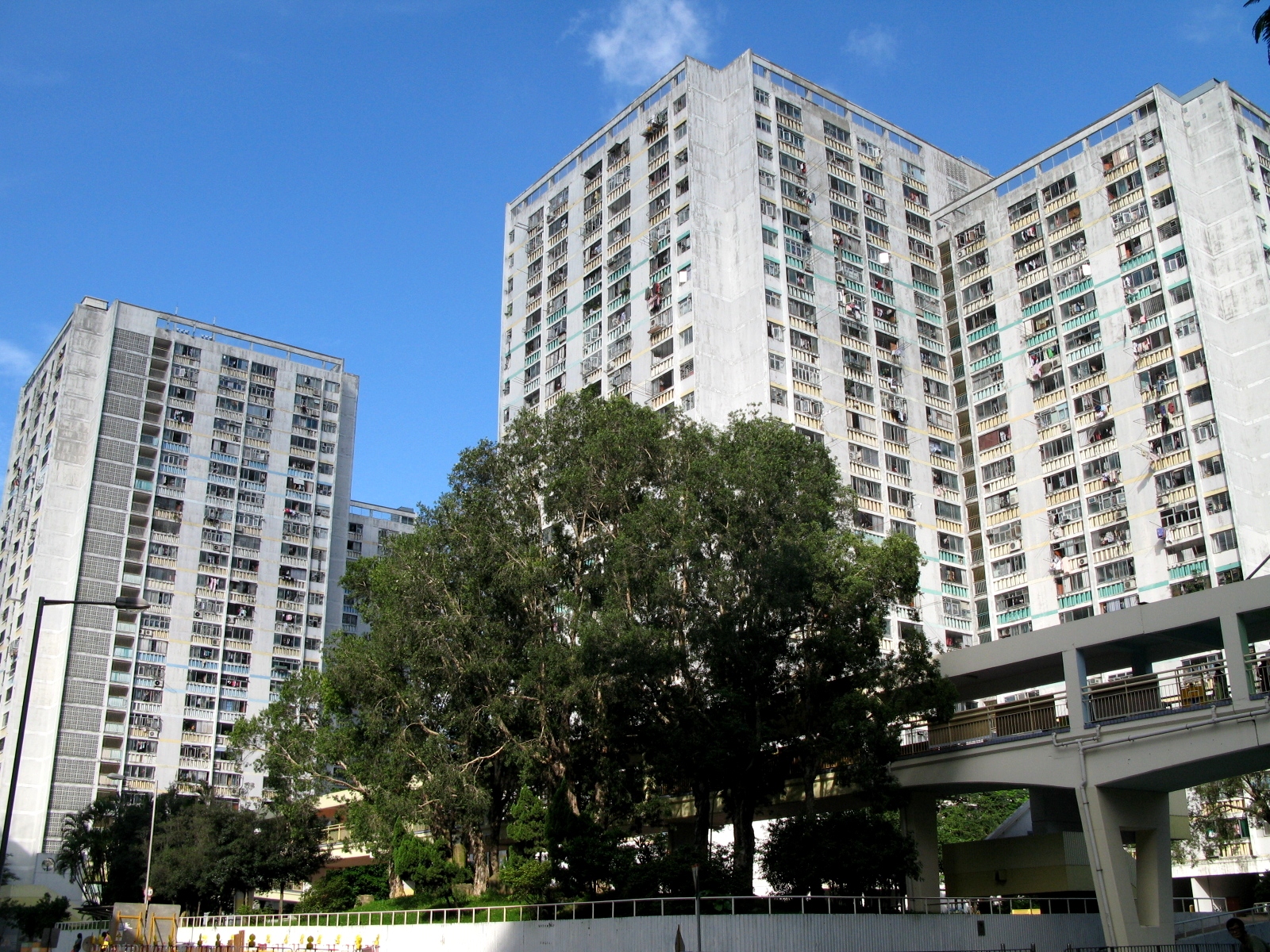
Twin Tower blocks of Wo Che Estate.

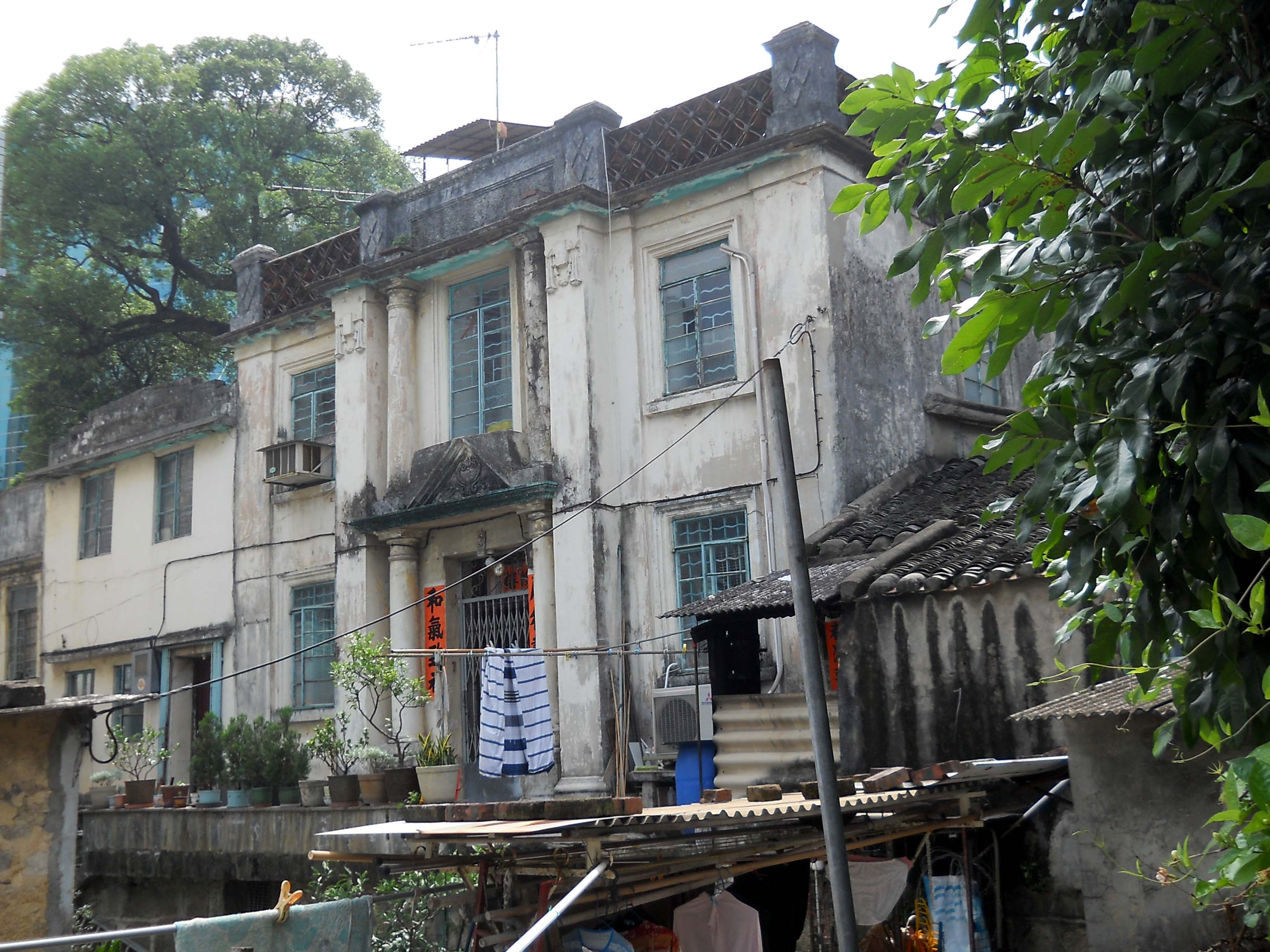
Nos. 7–10 Sheung Wo Che, listed as a Grade III historic buildings.

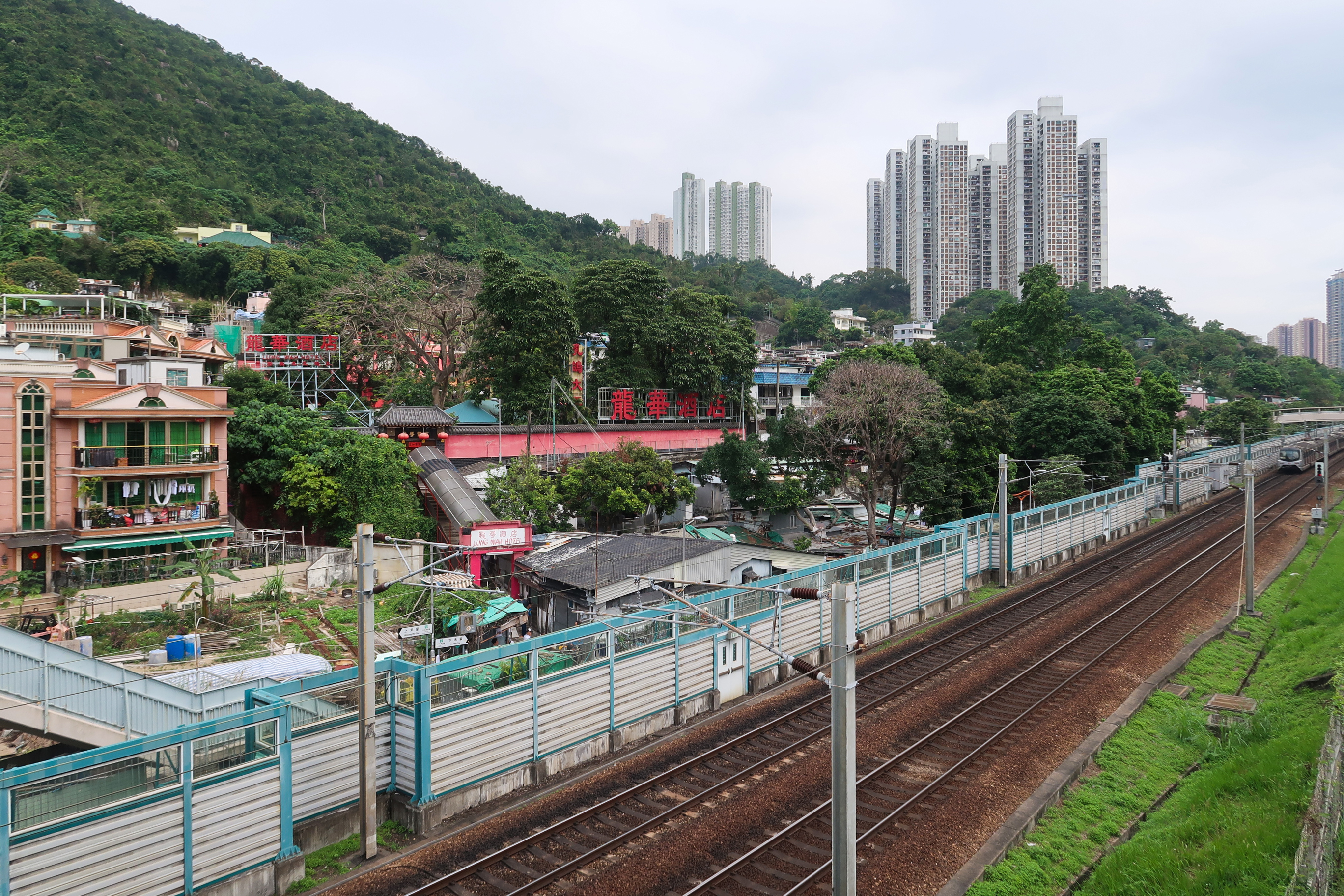
Lung Wah Hotel (龍華酒店) in Ha Wo Che, with tracks of the East Rail line. The buildings in the background are part of Sui Wo Court.

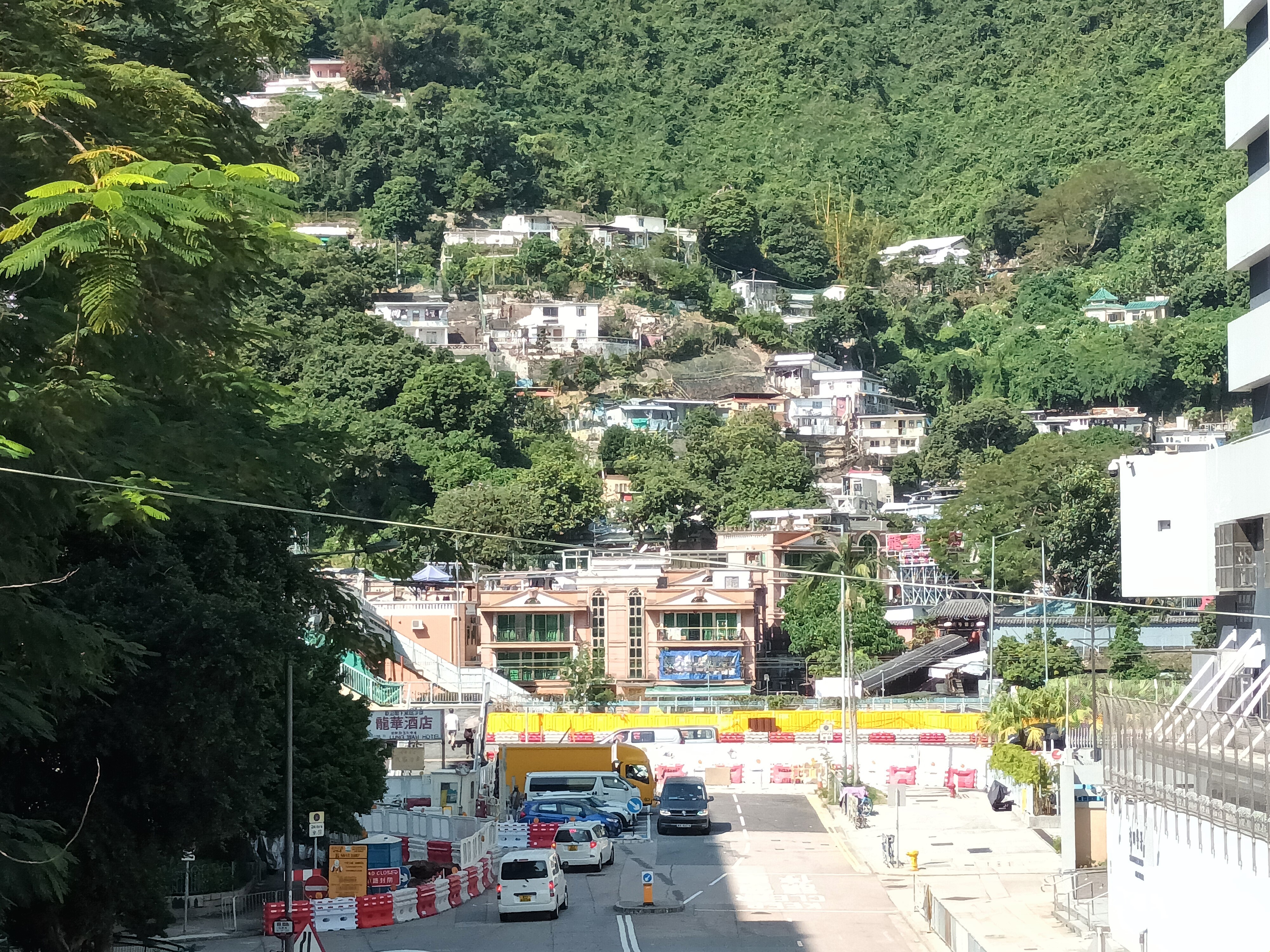
Parial view of Sheung Wo Che from Wo Che Street (禾輋街).

Wo Che (Chinese: 禾輋) is a village and an area in Sha Tin of Hong Kong. South of Fo Tan and north of proper Sha Tin, it is divided into Sheung Wo Che (上禾輋) and Ha Wo Che (下禾輋), and the reclamation by Shing Mun River.

The hilly area above the villages of Wo Che is often considered to the area of Fo Tan as its only main access, Sui Wo Road, leads to Fo Tan.

== Administration ==
Sheung Wo Che and Ha Wo Che are recognized villages under the New Territories Small House Policy. Wo Che is one of the villages represented within the Sha Tin Rural Committee. For electoral purposes, Wo Che is part of the Lek Yuen constituency, which was formerly represented by Jimmy Sham Tsz-kit until July 2021.

== Housing ==
Sheung Wo Che and Ha Wo Che are villages mainly occupying the lower hill. After beginning of Sha Tin New Town, on the reclamation, a public housing estate, Wo Che Estate, named after it was built, and many housing estates on the hills above villages of Sheung Wo Che was built. For housing estates under Home Ownership Scheme, Sui Wo Court, the Cantonese Wo (禾) indicated its position in Wo Che.

== History ==
Sheung Wo Che was originally a small village with a 150-year history. It was expanded after the construction of the Kowloon–Canton Railway in 1911, when city dwellers built holiday villas and summer retreat there. The houses at Nos. 7–10, built between the 1930s and the 1960s, are a surviving examples of this expansion. The buildings have been listed as Grade III historic buildings in 2011. The Nam Ancestral Hall, built in 1901, is also located in the village.

At the time of the 1911 census, the population of Ha Wo Che was 76, the number of males was 31. The population of Sheung Wo Che was 100, the number of males was 70.

== See also ==
- Kau Yeuk (Sha Tin)
