= Tung Lo Wan (Sha Tin) =

Village in Hong Kong

Coordinates: 22.378366°N 114.181038°E

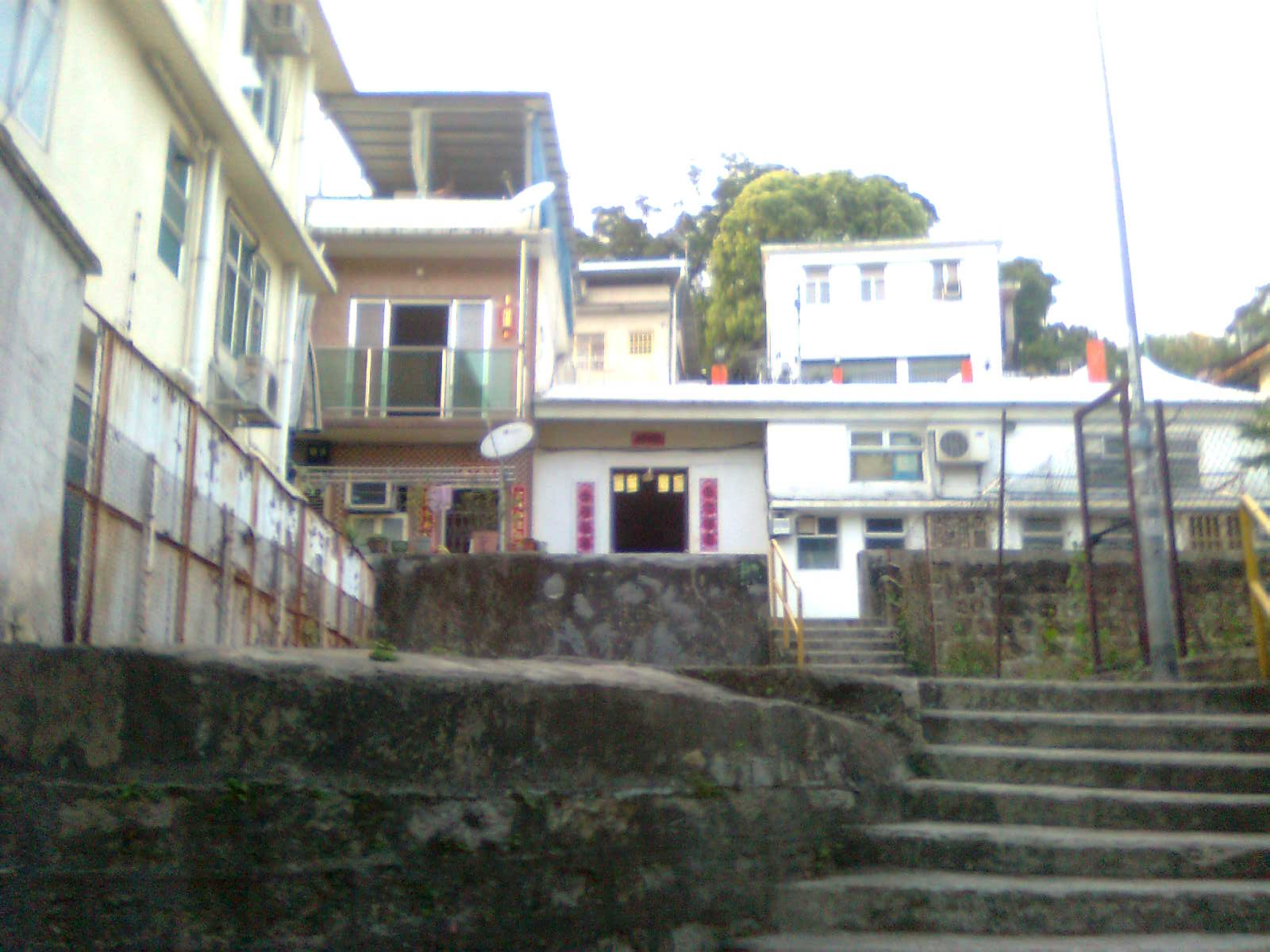
View of Tung Lo Wan in 2011. Tse Ancestral Hall is in the centre.

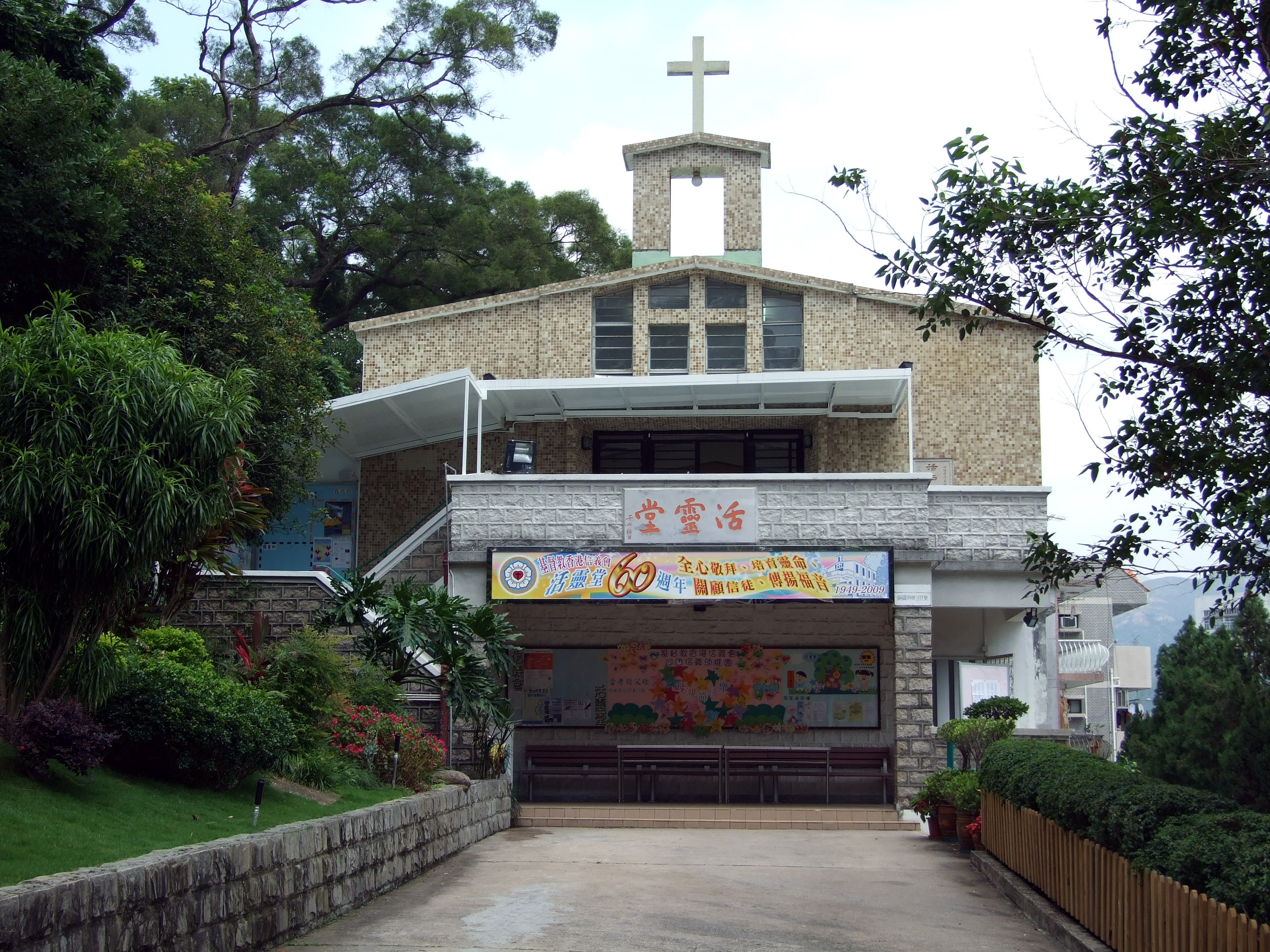
ELCHK Living Spirit Lutheran Church in Tung Lo Wan in May 2009.

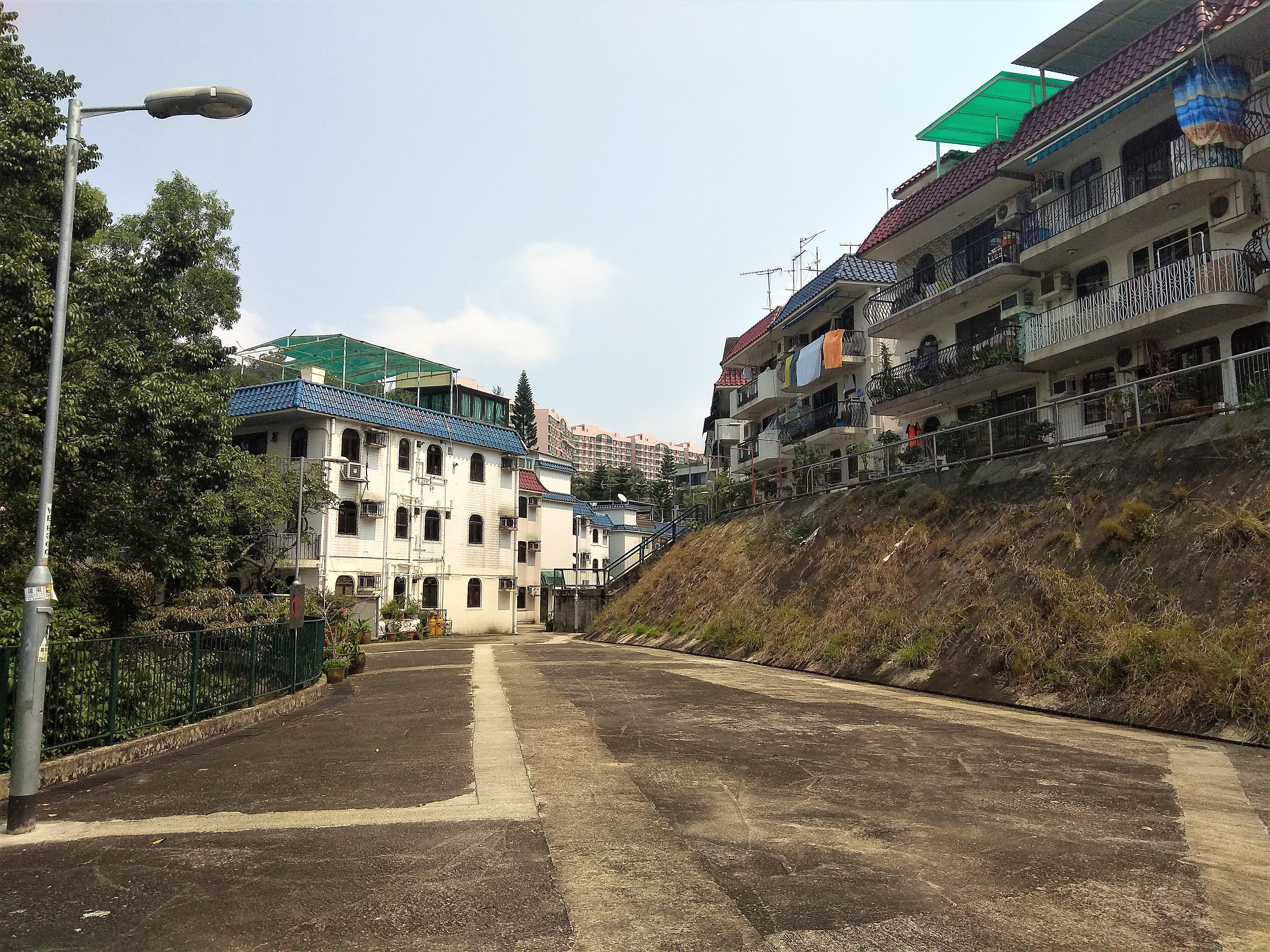
Tung Lo Wan Village Extension.

Tung Lo Wan (Chinese: 銅鑼灣) is a village in the Tai Wai area of Sha Tin District, Hong Kong.

== Location ==
Tung Lo Wan village is located east of Mei Lam Estate, across the Tai Wai Nullah.

== Administration ==
Tung Lo Wan is a recognised village under the New Territories Small House Policy.

== History ==
Tung Lo Wan was historically a Hakka village occupied by families of different surnames, the Yau (邱) being the majority. The first generation of the Tse clan who settled in the village moved to Tung Lo Wan in the early 20th century.

== Features ==
The Tse Ancestral Hall (謝氏祠堂), also called Tse Po Shu Tong (謝寶樹堂), was built before 1910. It is the only ancestral hall in the village. The Li Cottage (玉山艸堂), located nearby, at the corner of Tung Lo Wan Hill Road and Chung Ling Road, was built around 1918. It is connected by a path to the Li Tomb (李玉山伉儷墓) uphill.

== See also ==
- Kau Yeuk (Sha Tin)
