= Kwai Tei New Village =

Village in Hong Kong

Coordinates: 22.40083°N 114.18827°E

Kwai Tei New Village (Chinese: 桂地新村 or t龜地新村), also referred to as Kwai Tei Resite Area, is a village in the Fo Tan area of Sha Tin District, Hong Kong.

== Administration ==
Kwai Tei Resite Area is a recognized village under the New Territories Small House Policy.

== History ==
Kwai Tei New Village was established in 1979, when the original Kwai Tei (龜地) village was vacated to make room for a new industrial area.

== See also ==
- Kau Yeuk (Sha Tin)
