= To Shek =

Village of Hong Kong

Coordinates: 22.37702°N 114.20188°E

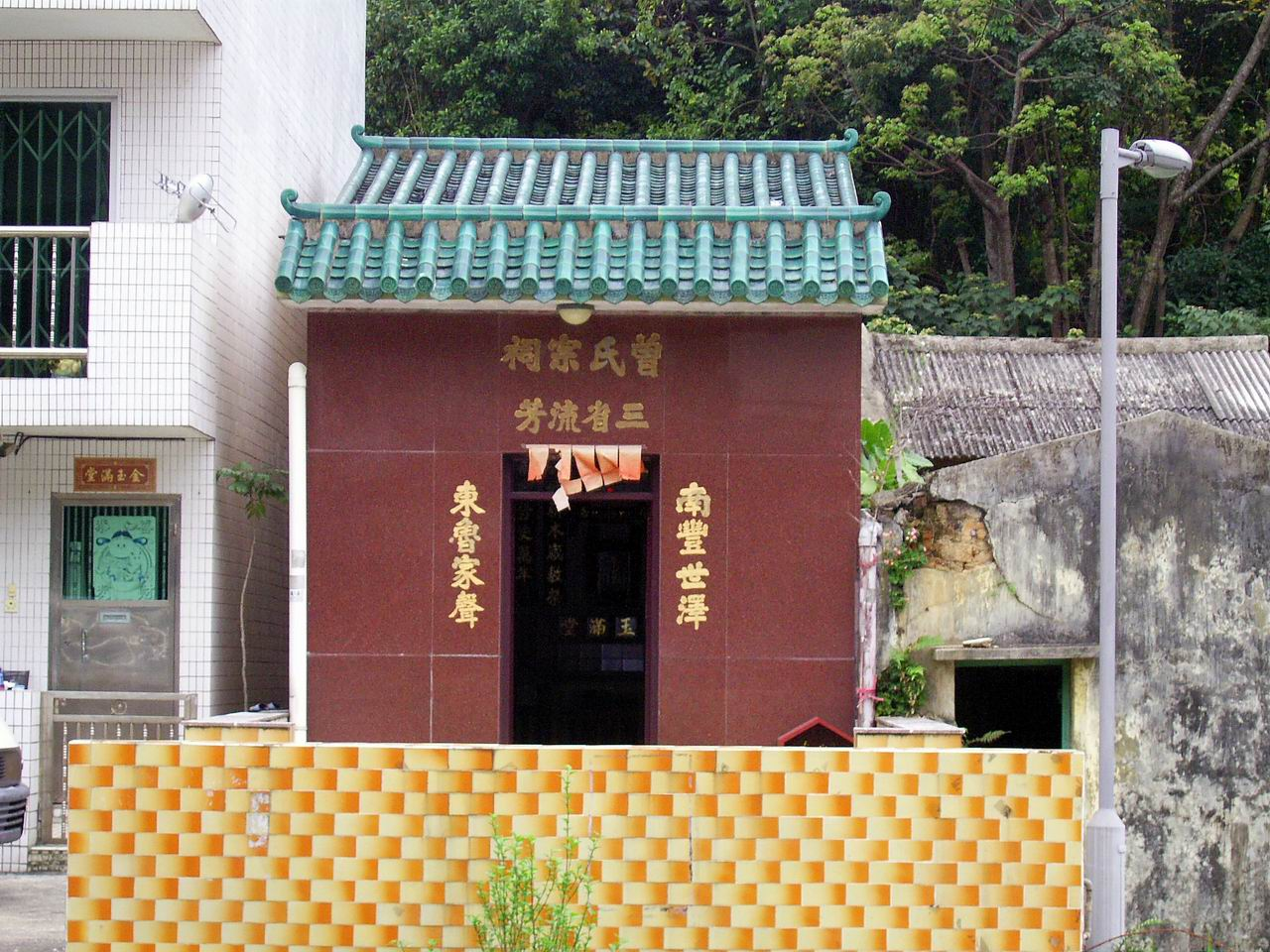
Tsang Ancestral Hall in To Shek.

To Shek (Chinese: 多石) is a village in Sha Tin District, Hong Kong.

== Administration ==
To Shek is a recognized village under the New Territories Small House Policy. It is one of the villages represented within the Sha Tin Rural Committee. For electoral purposes, To Shek is part of the Yu Yan constituency, which was formerly represented by Lo Yuet-chau until July 2021.
