= San Tin Village =

Village in Tai Wai, Sha Tin District, Hong Kong

Coordinates: 22.371821°N 114.182821°E

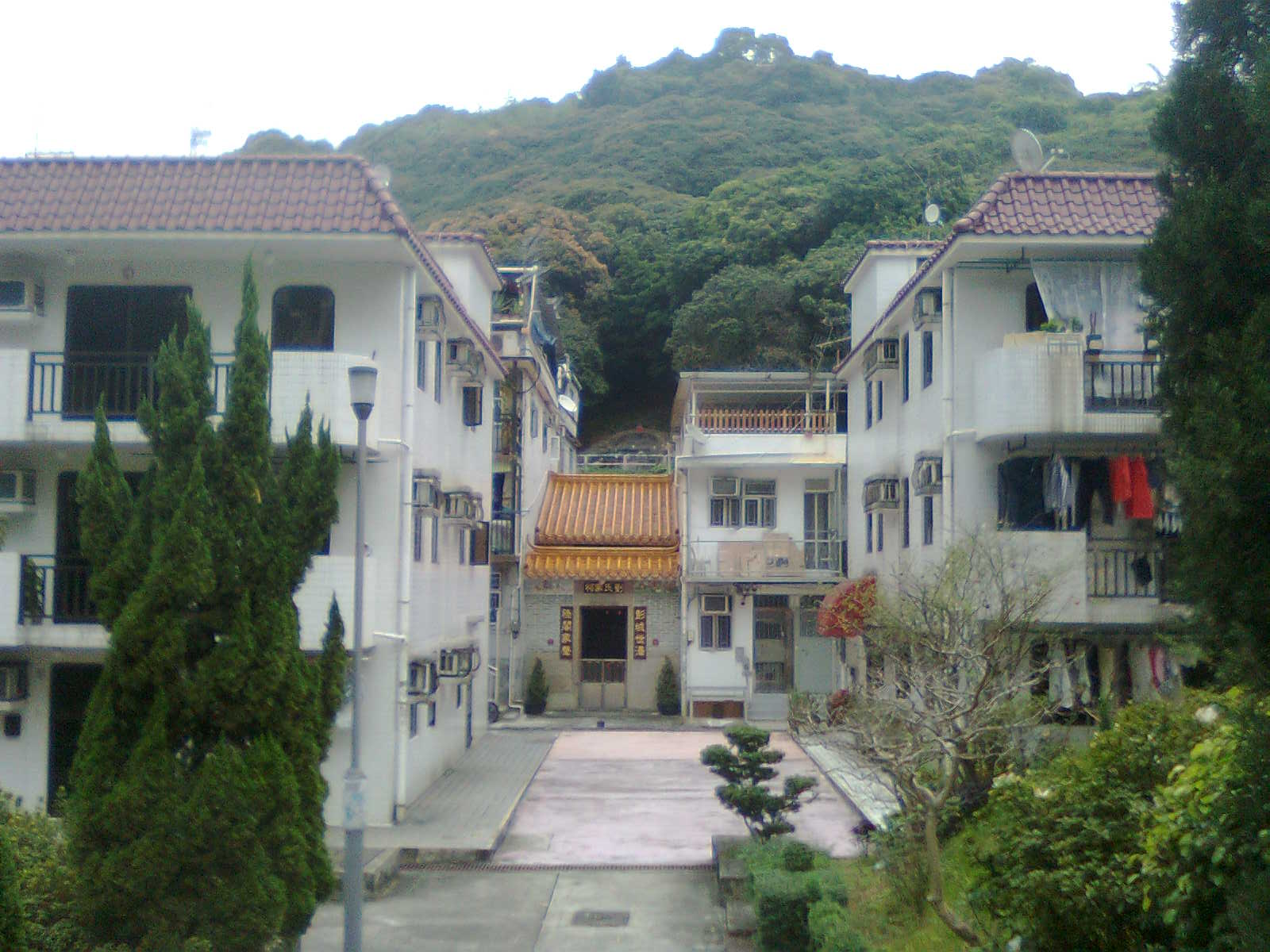
Lau Ancestral Hall in San Tin Village. The hill in the background is sometimes referred to as Chun Shek (秦石).

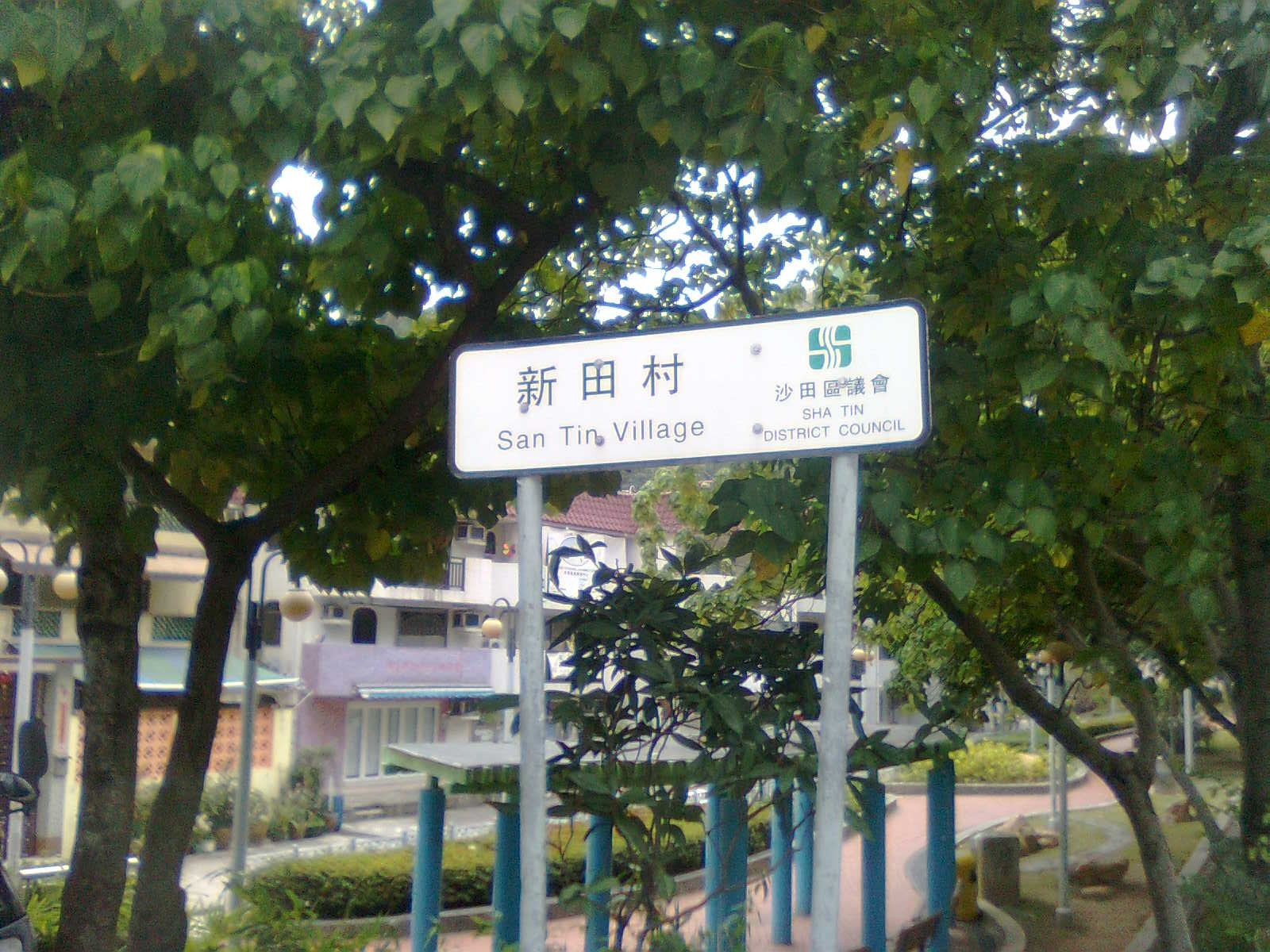
San Tin Village.

San Tin Village or San Tin Tsuen (Chinese: 新田村; lit. 'New Field Village'), sometimes referred to as San Tin Wai (新田圍), is a village in Tai Wai, Sha Tin District, Hong Kong, located south of Che Kung Temple and east of Sun Chui Estate.

== Administration ==
San Tin Wai is a recognized village under the New Territories Small House Policy.

== History ==
San Tin Village was historically a single-clan village of the Lau (劉), and it now features the Lau Ancestral Hall (劉氏家祠). The Lau were Hakkas who first moved from Huizhou to Au Pui Wan Tsuen near Grassy Hill, northwest of Sha Tin, during the 18th century. They were farmers engaged in cultivation. As their population increased, they bought a piece of land from the Kak Tin and Tin Sam villages and established a new village called 'San Tin' (lit. "new field") in the late 1890s. At the time of the 1911 census, the population of San Tin was 109.

== See also ==
- Kau Yeuk (Sha Tin)
- Che Kung Temple, a temple located next to San Tin Village
- Sun Tin Wai Estate
