= Chek Nai Ping =

Village in Hong Kong

Coordinates: 22.42028°N 114.200735°E

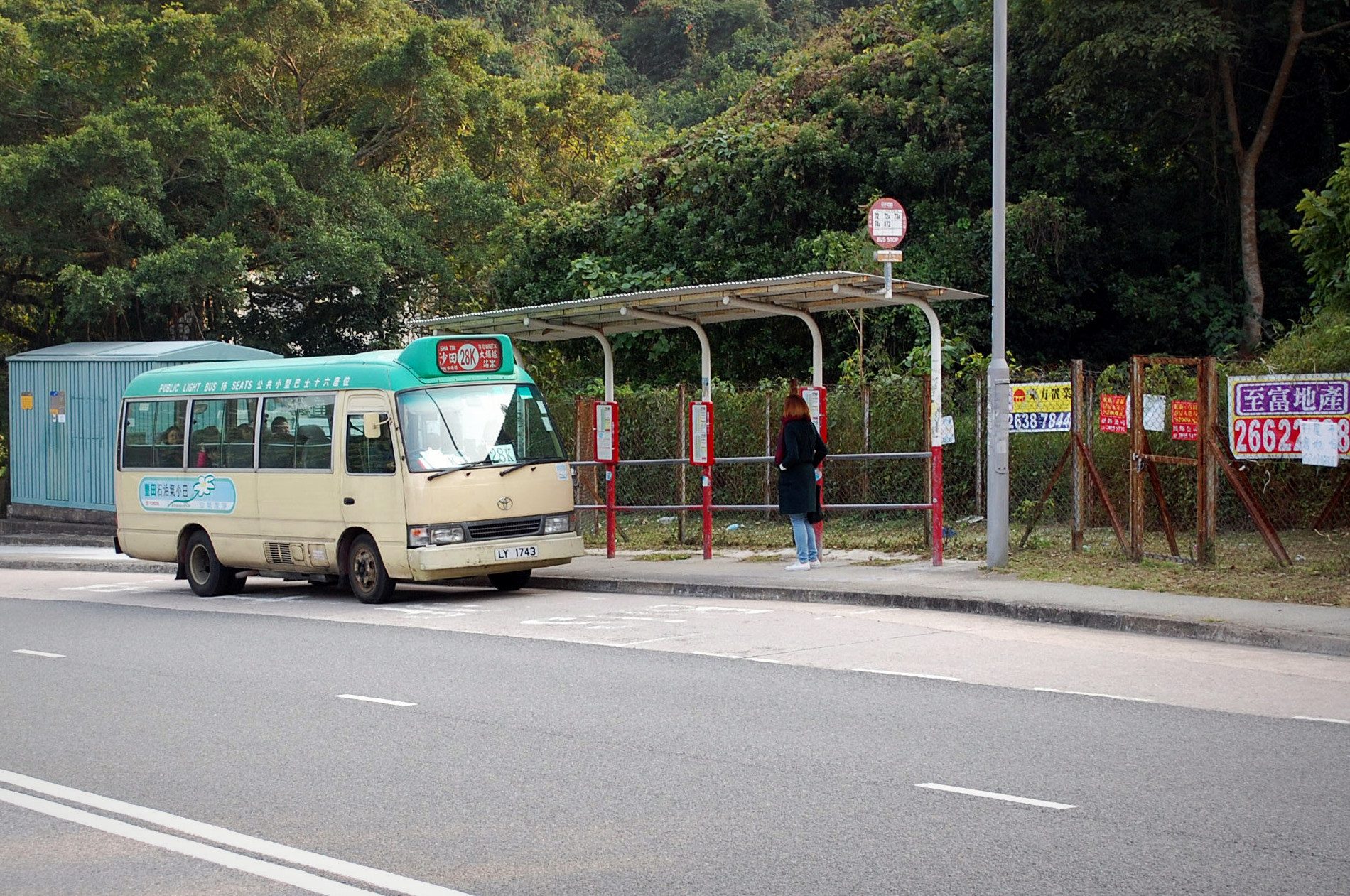
Minibus stop along Tai Po Road at Chek Nai Ping.

Chek Nai Ping (Chinese: 赤泥坪) is a village in Sha Tin District, Hong Kong.

== Administration ==
Chek Nai Ping is a recognized village under the New Territories Small House Policy.

== History ==
At the time of the 1911 census, the population of Chek Nai Ping was 122. The number of males was 70.

== See also ==
- Kau Yeuk (Sha Tin)
