= Pat Tsz Wo =

Village in Hong Kong

Coordinates: 22.399067°N 114.195728°E

Pat Tsz Wo (Chinese: 拔子窩) is a village in Fo Tan, Sha Tin District, Hong Kong.

== Administration ==
Pat Tsz Wo is a recognized village under the New Territories Small House Policy.

== See also ==
- Kau Yeuk (Sha Tin)
