= Ho Lek Pui =

Village in Fo Tan, Hong Kong

Coordinates: 22.410555°N 114.182364°E

Ho Lek Pui (Chinese: 河瀝背) is a village in Fo Tan, Sha Tin District, Hong Kong.

== Administration ==
Ho Lek Pui is a recognized village under the New Territories Small House Policy.

== History ==
At the time of the 1911 census, the population of Ho Lek Pui was 45. The number of males was 18.

== See also ==
- Kau Yeuk (Sha Tin)
