= Shek Lau Tung =

Village in Sha Tin District, Hong Kong

Coordinates: 22.4086491°N 114.1719946°E

Shek Lau Tung (Chinese: 石榴洞) is a village in the Fo Tan area of Sha Tin District, Hong Kong.

== Administration ==
Shek Lau Tung is a recognized village under the New Territories Small House Policy.

== See also ==
- Kau Yeuk (Sha Tin)
