= Shan Mei =

Village in Hong Kong

Coordinates: 22.406392°N 114.180343°E

Shan Mei (Chinese: 山尾) is a village in the Fo Tan area of Sha Tin District, Hong Kong.

== Administration ==
Shap Yi Wat is a recognized village under the New Territories Small House Policy.

== History ==
At the time of the 1911 census, the population of Shan Mei was 94. The number of males was 42.

== See also ==
- Kau Yeuk (Sha Tin)
