= Tin Sam Tsuen, Sha Tin District =

Village in Hong Kong

Coordinates: 22.369805°N 114.178170°E

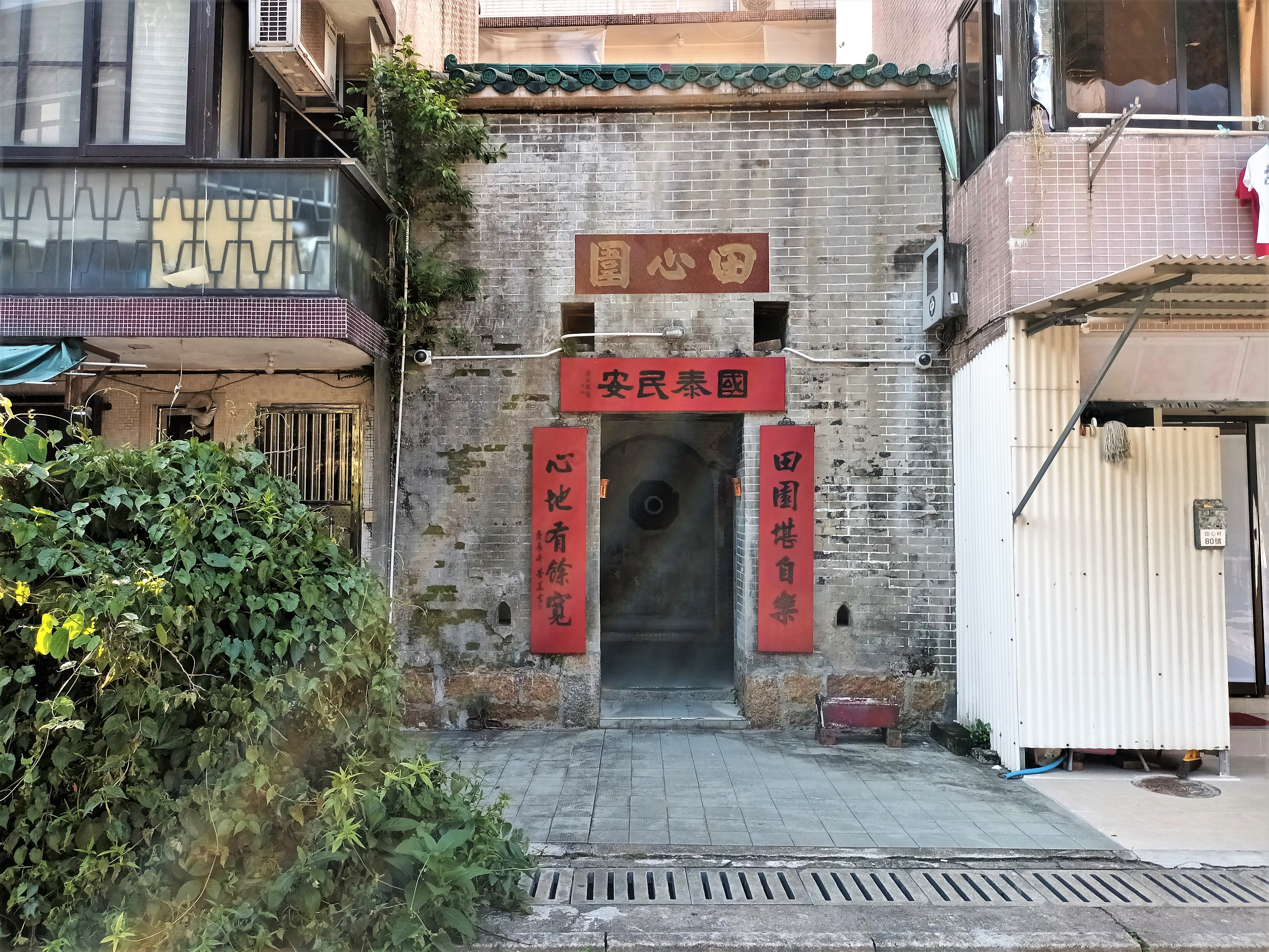
Entrance gate of Tin Sam Wai.

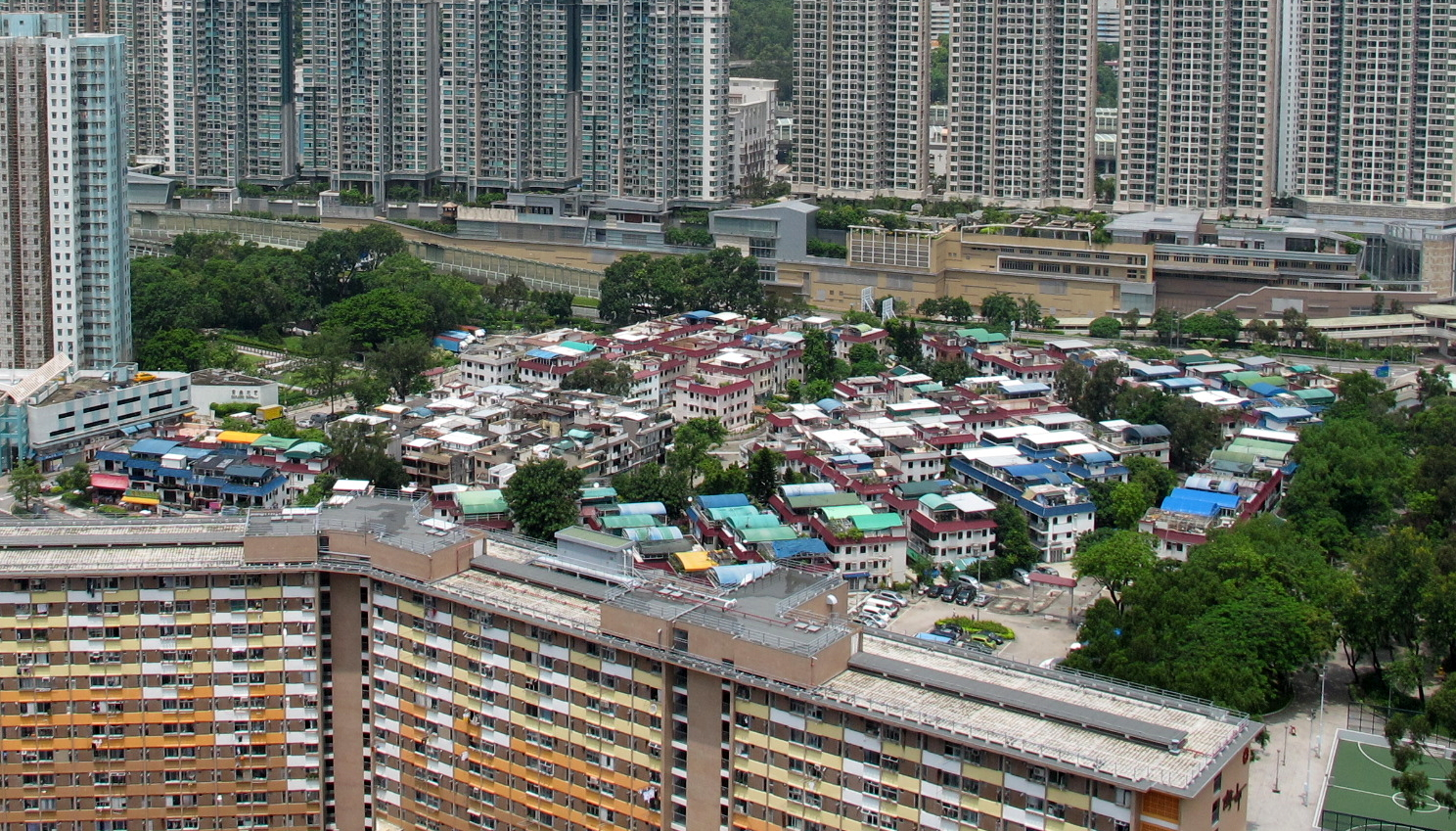
View of Tin Sam Village, with Lung Hang Estate in the foreground and Festival City in the background.

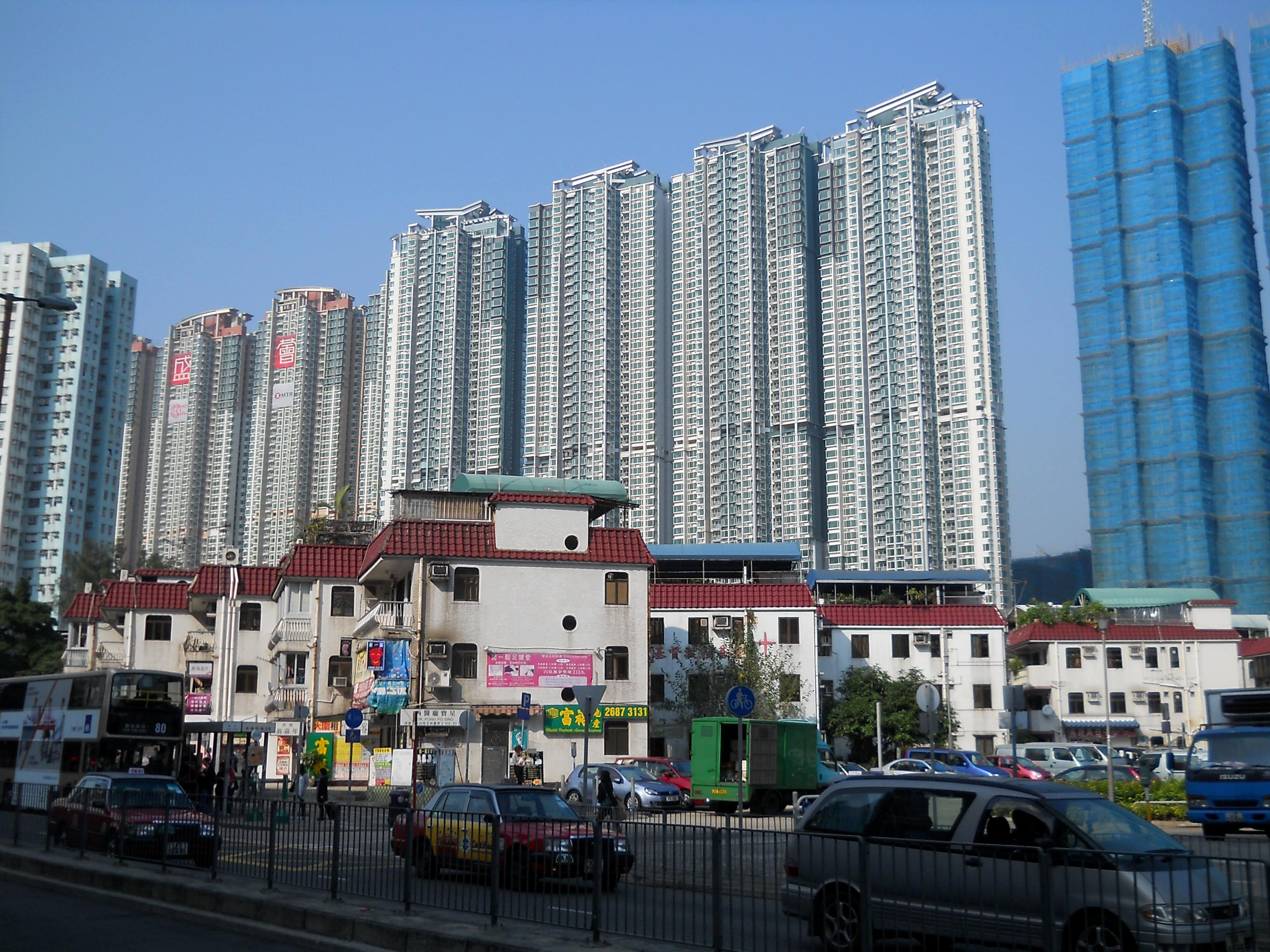
View of Tin Sam Village, with Festival City in the background.

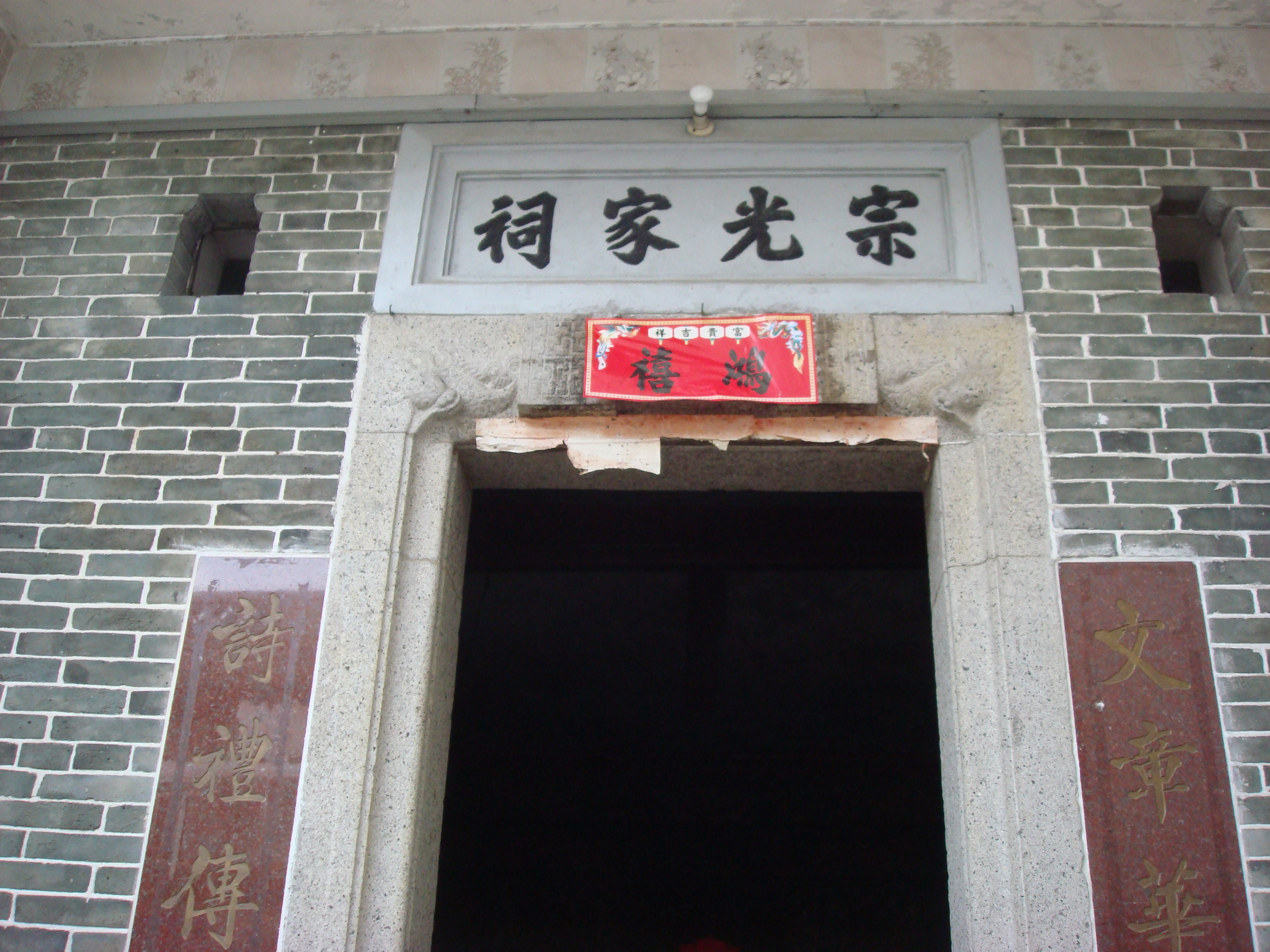
Choi Ancestral Hall (宗光家祠) in Tin Sam Village.

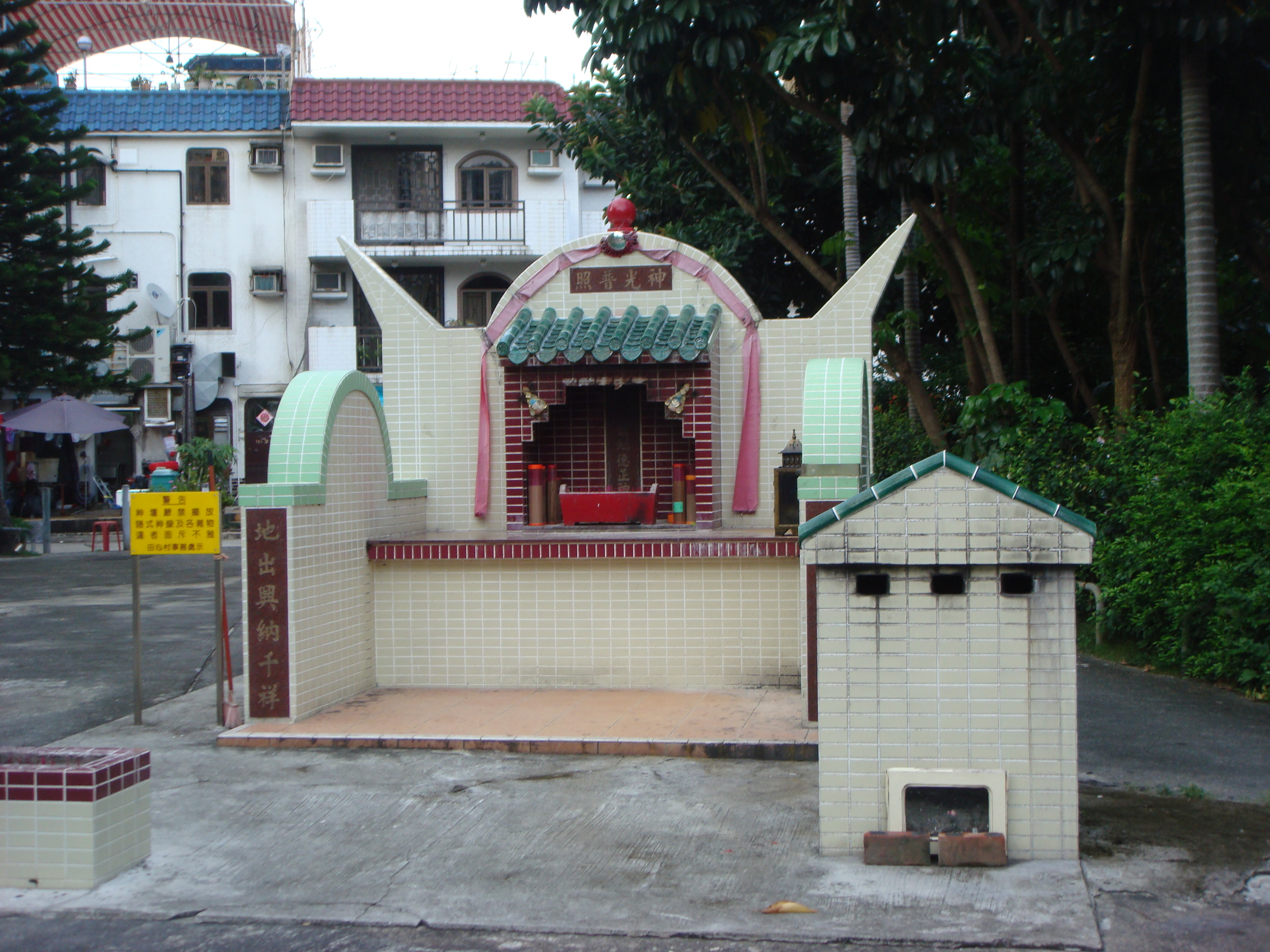
Earth God shrine in Tin Sam.

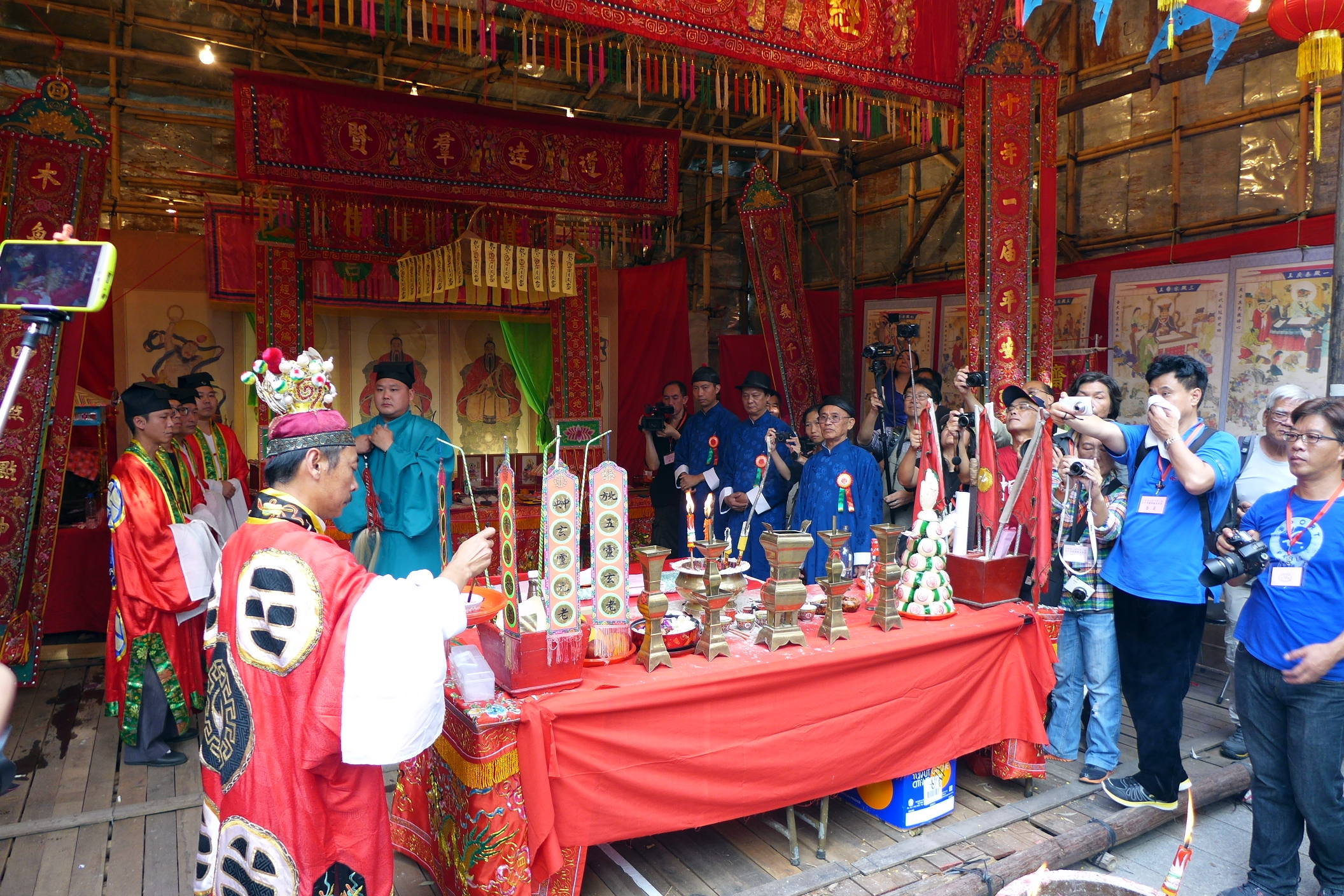
Tin Sam Da Jiu Festival.

Tin Sam Village or Tin Sam Tsuen (Chinese: 田心村), sometimes transliterated as Tin Sum, is a village in Tai Wai, Sha Tin District, Hong Kong. It is located west of Sun Chui Estate, north of Lung Hang Estate, and southeast of Festival City. Part of Tin Sam Village consists of Tin Sam Wai (田心圍), a historic walled village.

== Administration ==
Tin Sam is a recognized village under the New Territories Small House Policy. It is one of the villages represented within the Sha Tin Rural Committee. For electoral purposes, Tin Sam Tsuen is part of the Tin Sum constituency., which was formerly represented by Tsang Kit until July 2021.

== History ==
Tin Sam was founded in the late Ming Dynasty (1368-1644). It was a Punti walled village, historically inhabited by the Choi (蔡), the Wai (韋), the Leung (梁), the Tsang (曾) and the Liu (廖). A moat was built for its protection, and was later filled up and used as a fish pond.

The Che Kung Temple in Tai Wai was built and initially managed by Tin Sam Village. The village lost its managerial rights in the late 19th century in a lawsuit against the Kau Yeuk (九約, "Alliance of Nine" [villages]), a regional organization of various groups in Sha Tin Valley, that was settled in a lawsuit at the yamen. The Kau Yeuk had provided evidence that it made significant contributions to the renovation of the temple. The Kau Yeuk could prove its case by referring to the rhymed couplets that were inscribed on both sides of the main entrance and that bore its name. The temple was subsequently jointly managed by nine villages of Sha Tin, while Tin Sam Village continued to enjoy some privileges in the worship of Che Kung. Since 1936, the temple has been administered by the Chinese Temples Committee.

== Features ==
Historic buildings in the village include the Choi Ancestral Hall, also known as Chung Kwong Family Hall (宗光家祠), built around the 1920s, the Leung Ancestral Halls (梁氏祠堂), two ancestral houses, largely rebuilt and occupied by tenants, the Liu Ancestral Hall (廖氏祠堂), and the Entrance Gate, built during the Qing Dynasty. Two rectangular holes are above the front doorways of the Gate for feng shui benefit and for security watching.

== Festival ==
The Da Jiu Festival of the village is organized every 10 years. It was celebrated in December 2006 and in 2016.

== See also ==
- Tai Wai for a detailed list of the other villages in the area
- San Tin Village
- Walled villages of Hong Kong
- List of villages in Hong Kong
