= Shek Kwu Lung (Tai Po District) =

Village in Hong Kong

Coordinates: 22.448753°N 114.156603°E

Shek Kwu Lung (Chinese: 石古壟) is a village in Tai Po District, Hong Kong.

== Administration ==
Shek Kwu Lung is one of the villages represented within the Tai Po Rural Committee. For electoral purposes, Shek Kwu Lung is part of the San Fu constituency, which was formerly represented by Max Wu Yiu-cheong until May 2021.

Shek Kwu Lung is a recognized village under the New Territories Small House Policy.

== History ==
At the time of the 1911 census, the population of Shek Kwu Lung was 72, with 30 males.
