= Fa Sam Hang =

Village in Hong Kong

Coordinates: 22.38163°N 114.22209°E

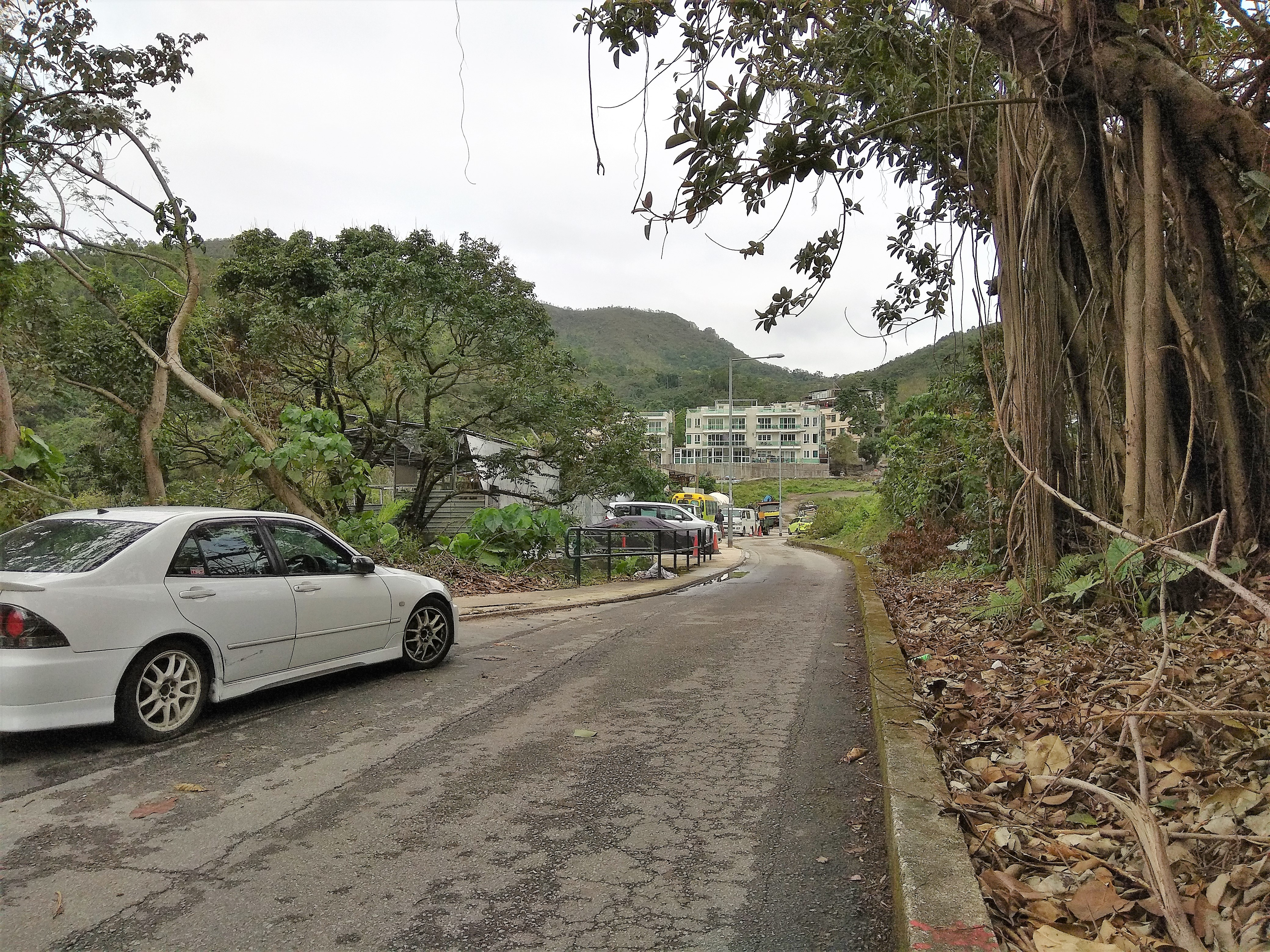
Fa Sham Hang.

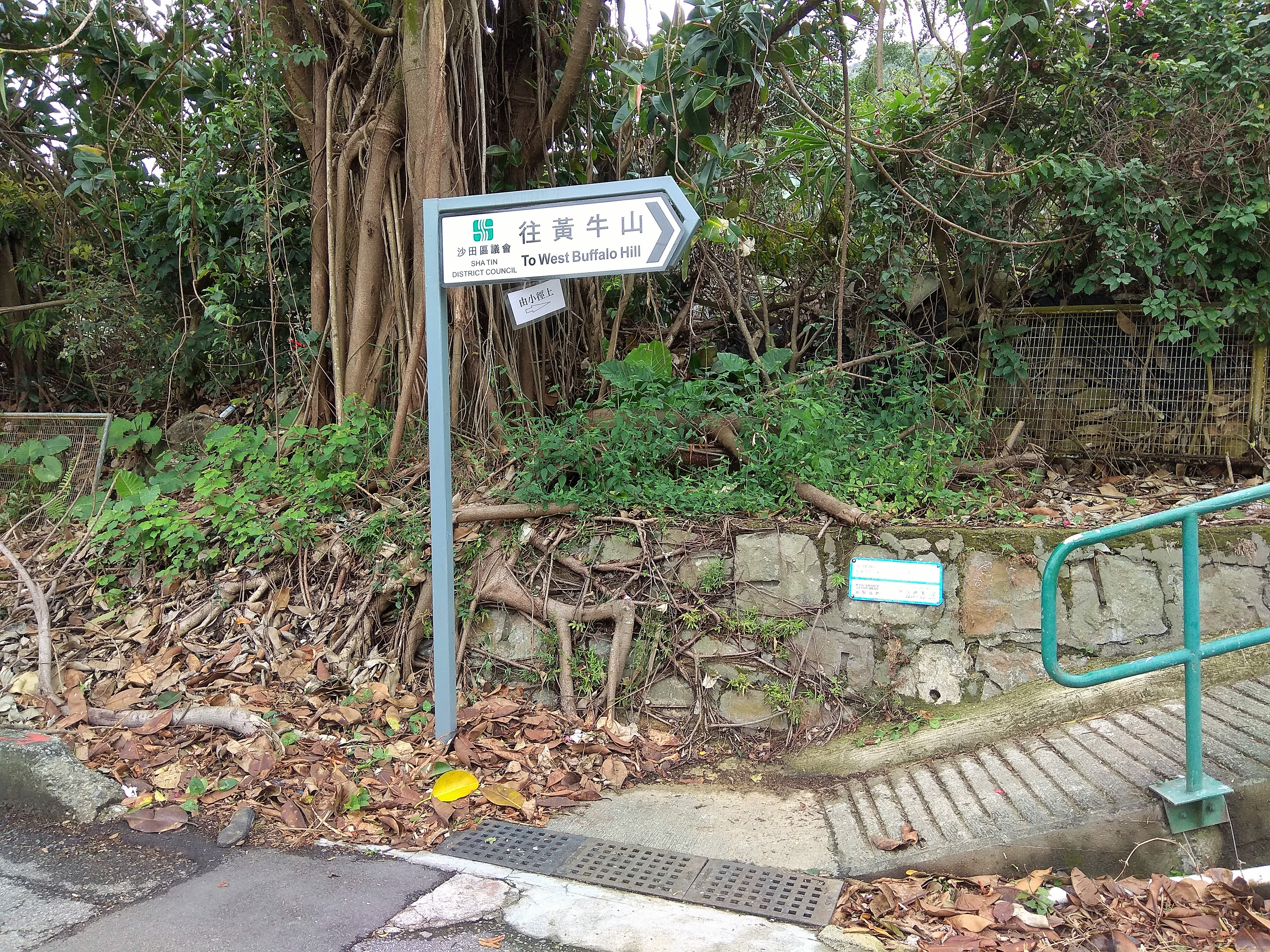
Start of hiking trail to West Buffalo Hill near Fa Sam Hang.

Fa Sam Hang (Chinese: 花心坑) is a village in the Siu Lek Yuen area of Sha Tin District, Hong Kong.

== Administration ==
Fa Sam Hang is a recognized village under the New Territories Small House Policy.

== History ==
Fa Sam Hang had a population of five living in two houses in 1911.
