= Kwong Hong (constituency) =

Hong Kong constituency

- 廣康
- Elected constituency for the Sha Tin District Council
- Boundary of Kwong Hong in Sha Tin District
- District: Sha Tin
- Legislative Council constituency: New Territories South East
- Population: 13,200 (2019)
- Electorate: 7,870 (2019)

Current constituency
- Created: 1999
- Number of members: One
- Member: Vacant

Kwong Hong
- Traditional Chinese: 廣康
Transcriptions
Yue: Cantonese
- Yale Romanization: Gwóng hōng
- Jyutping: Gwong2 hong1

Kwong Hong is one of the 41 constituencies of the Sha Tin District Council. The seat elects one member of the council every four years. The constituency has an estimated population of 13,200.

== Councillors represented ==
Election	Member	Party
1999	Cheng Cho-kwong	DAB
2015	Wong Fu-sang	DAB
2019	Ricardo Liao Pak-hong→Vacant	Independent democrat

== Election results ==
=== 2010s ===
Sha Tin District Council Election, 2019: Kwong Hong
Party	Candidate	Votes	%	±%
PfD	Ricardo Liao Pak-hong	3,333	57.32	
DAB	Wong Fu-sang	2,081	35.79	
Nonpartisan	Paul Choi Chun-chiu	401	6.90	
Majority		1,252	21.53	
Turnout		5,824	74.03	
PfD gain from DAB		Swing		
