= Sha Tin Rural Committee =

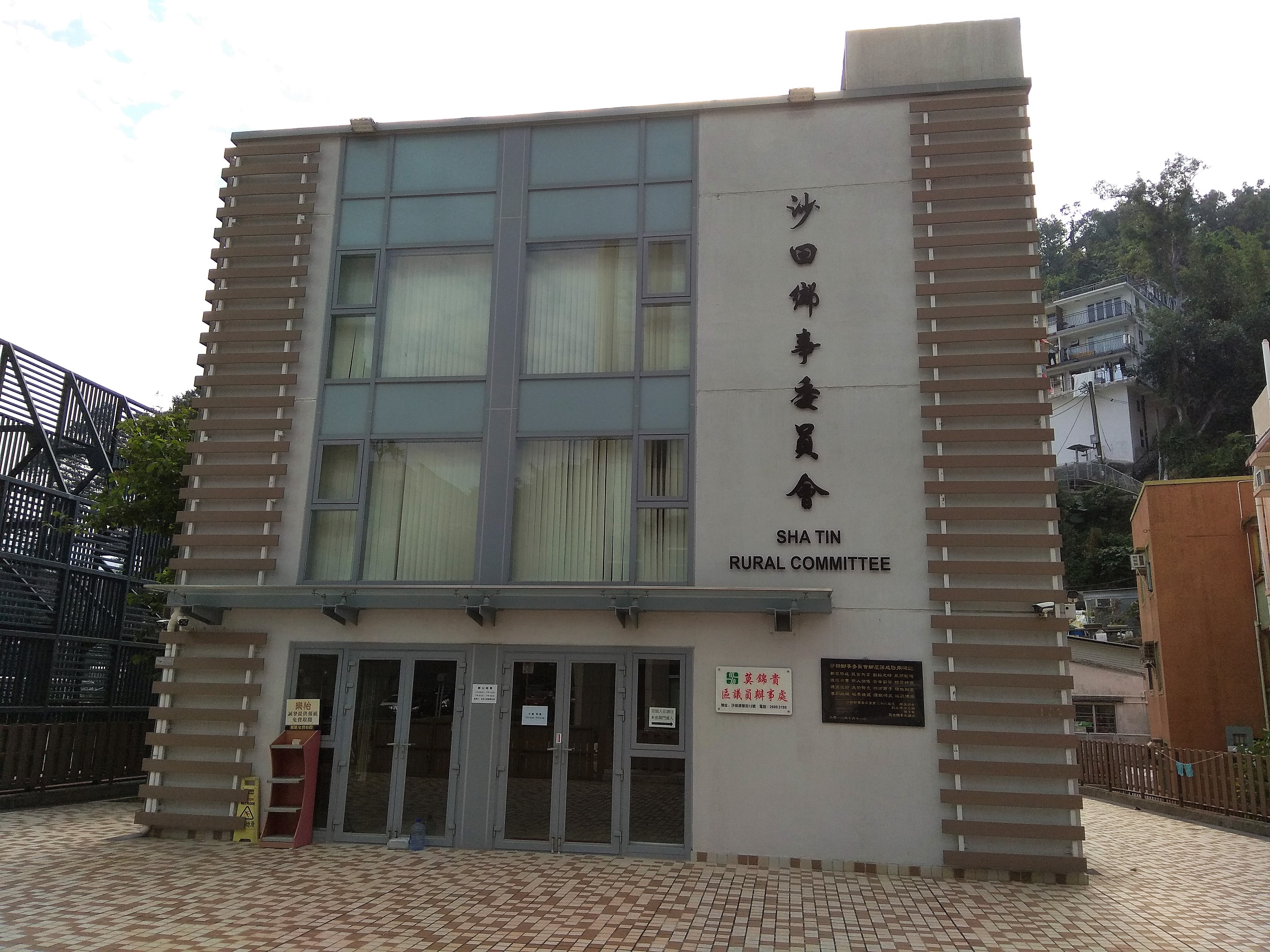
Sha Tin Rural Committee Building in Pai Tau Village.

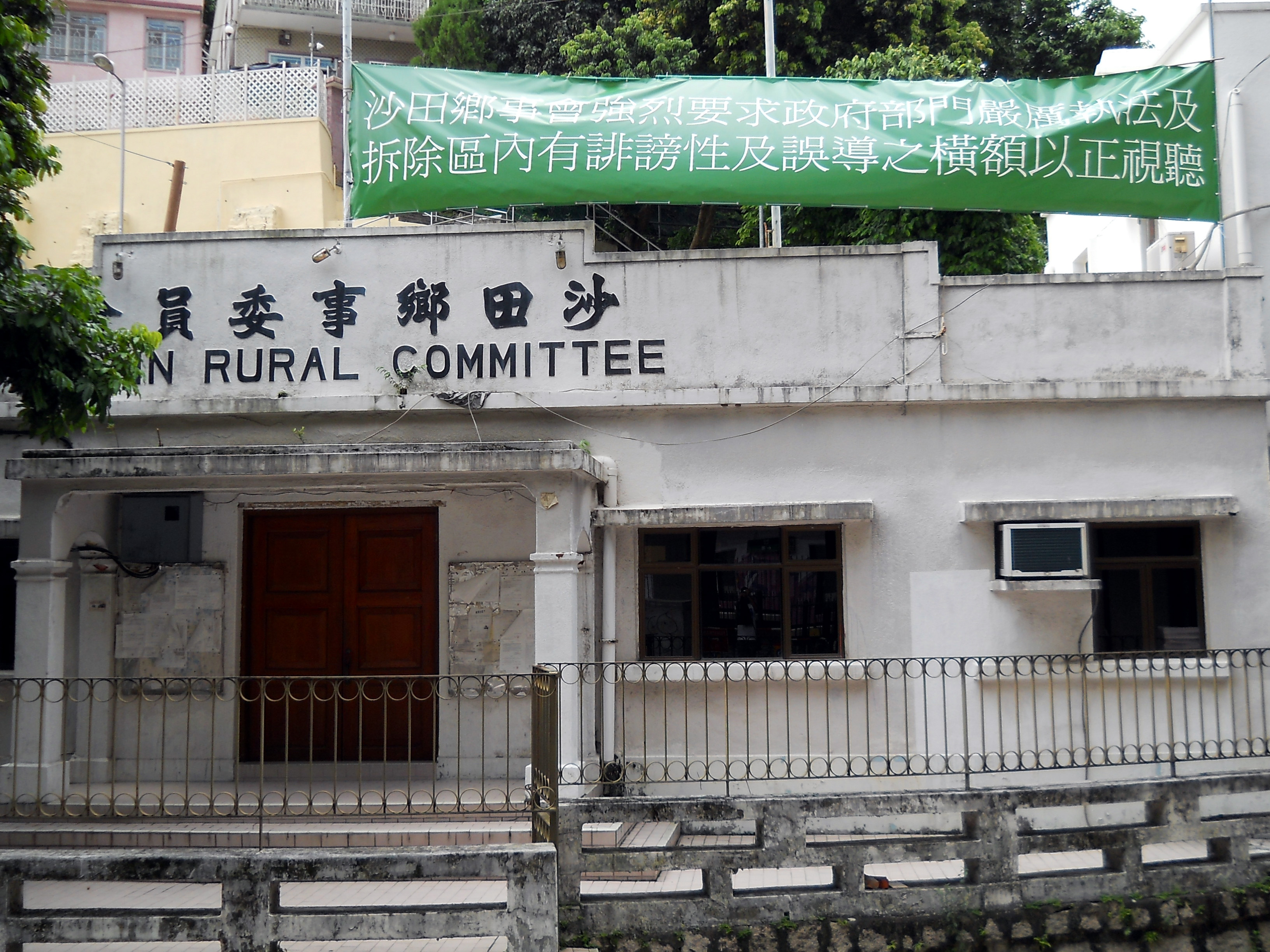
Former Sha Tin Rural Committee Building in Pai Tau Village.

Sha Tin Rural Committee (Chinese: 沙田鄉事委員會) is a rural committee representing the interest of villages in Sha Tin District, Hong Kong.
