= KMB Route 80K =

Hong Kong bus route in Sha Tin

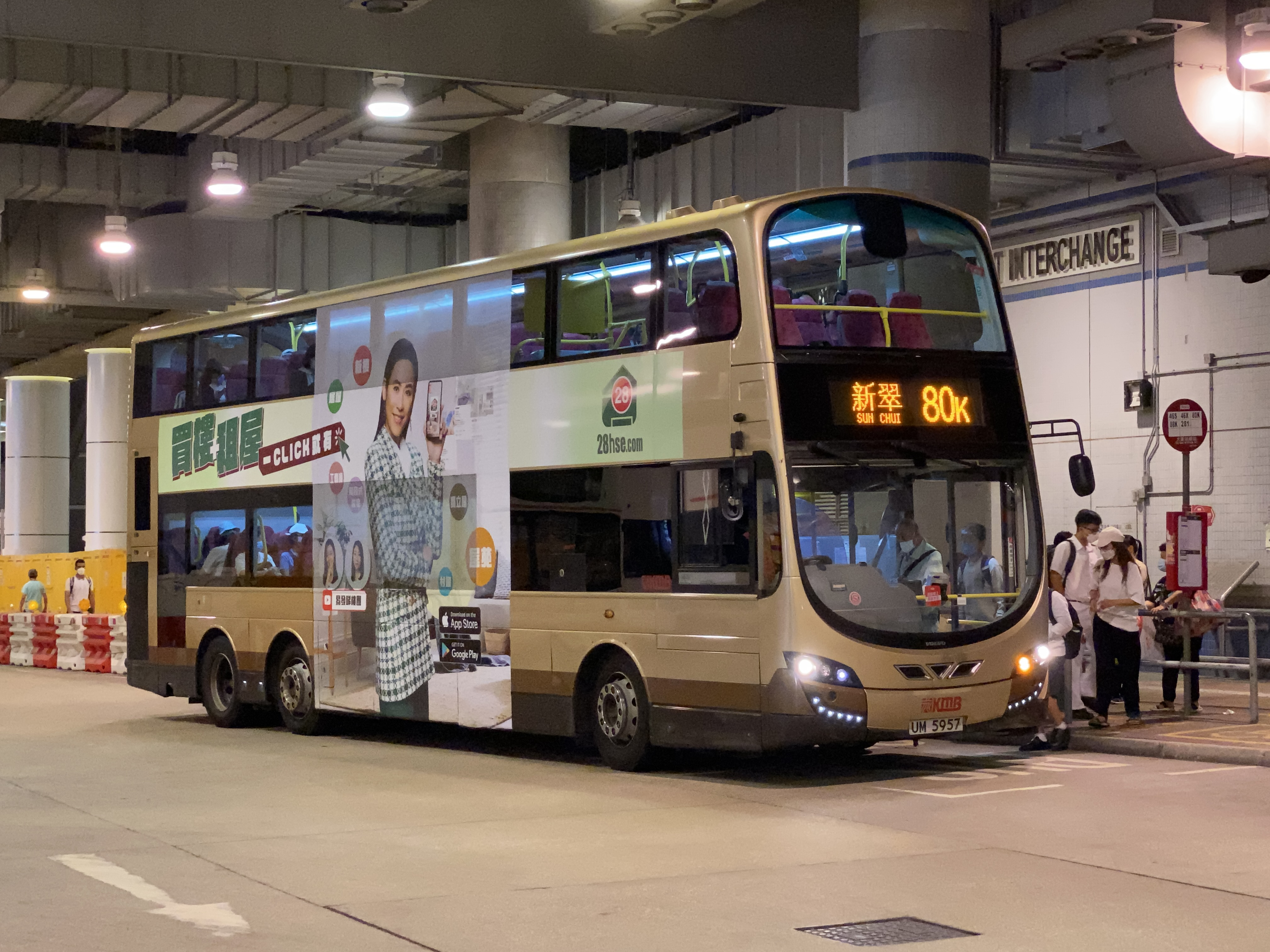
- A Volvo B9TL running Route 80K at Tai Wai Railway Station Bus Terminus

Overview
- Operator: Kowloon Motor Bus
- Garage: Sha Tin Depot
- Vehicle: Enviro500 MMC (ATENU)

Route
- Start: Sun Chui
- Via: Tai Wai station Mei Lam Estate; Sha Tin Central; Prince of Wales Hospital
- End: Yu Chui Court
- Length: 8.4 km
- Competition: MTR; KMB Routes 83K, 88K, 283, 49X, 86

Service
- Level: 05:30-00:35
- Frequency: Mondays to Fridays: 11-25 mins Saturdays, Sundays and public holidays: 12-25 mins
- Journey time: 41 mins

KMB Route 80K is a bus route in New Territories operated by Kowloon Motor Bus. It runs from Sun Chui Estate to Yu Chui Court via Tai Wai station, Mei Lam Estate, Sha Tin Central and Prince of Wales Hospital. The full fare is $5.8.

== History ==
Route 80K was started on 9 November 1983, the initial terminus was at Wo Che. It was extended from Wo Che to Siu Lek Yuen on 2 December 1984 and was shortened to Yuen Chau Kok on 7 April 1989. Air-conditioned busses were added to the route on 30 April 1999.

The terminus was extended to Yu Chui Court 11 November 2001. KMB provided better air-conditioning on 18 September 2011. An Estimated Time of Arrival was added to this route on 18 December 2014. The last departure from Yu Chui Court was extended from 00:30 to 00:35 on 21 July 2025.

== Route ==
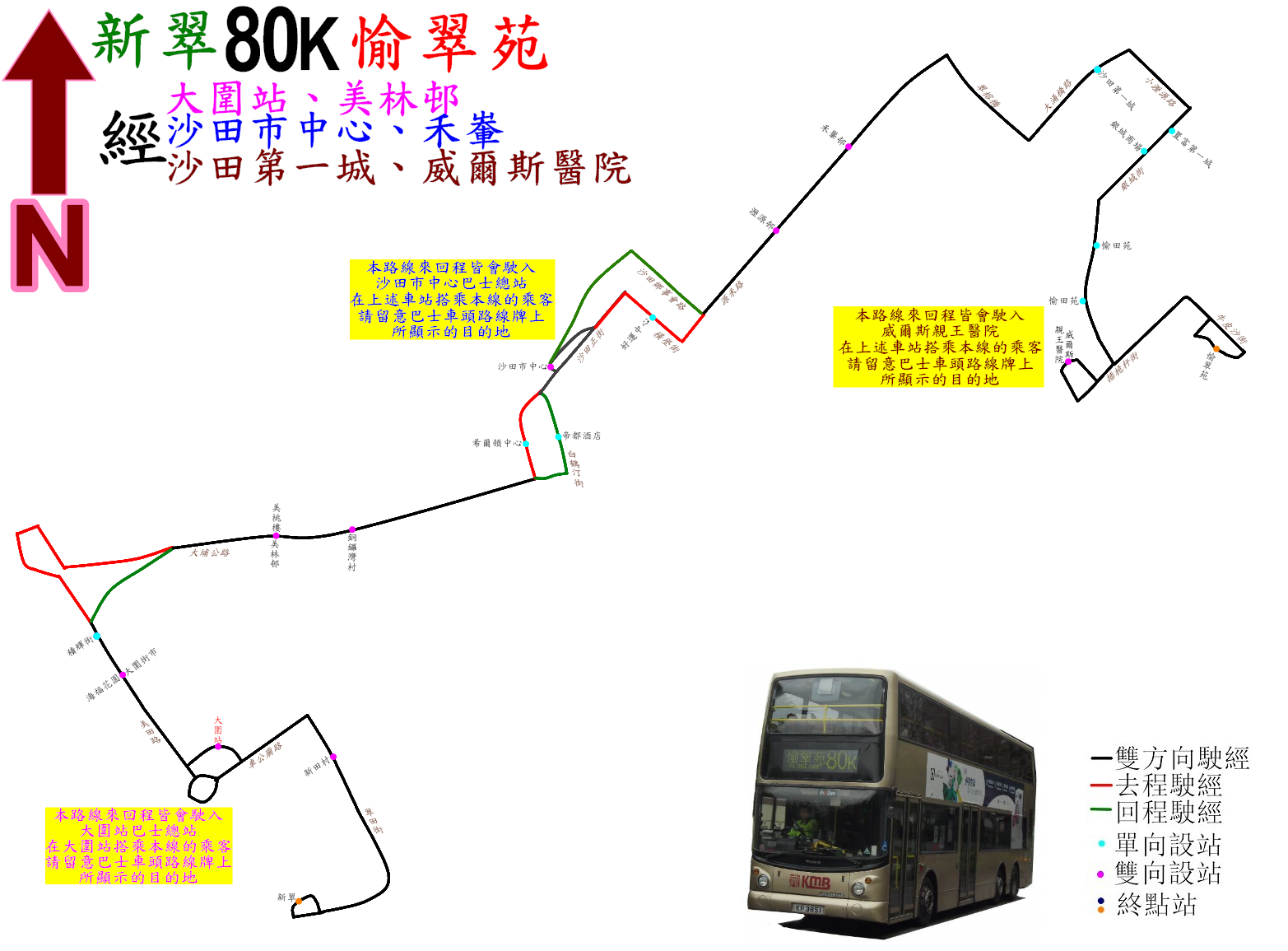
Route of 80K

Start at Sun Chui Bus Terminus			Start at Yu Chui Court Public Transport Interchange		
No.	Name of Bus Stop	Place	No.	Name of Bus Stop	Place
1	Sun Chui Bus Terminus	Bus Terminus	1	Yu Chui Court Public Transport Interchange	Bus Terminus
2	San Tin Village	Chui Tin Street	2	Prince of Wales Hospital	Chap Wai Kon Street
3	Tai Wai Station Public Transport Interchange	Bus Terminus	3	Yue Tin Court	Ngan Shing Street
4	Holford Garden	Mei Tin Road	4	Fortune City One	Ngan Shing Street
5	Chik Fai Street	Mei Tin Road	5	City One Shatin	Tai Chung Kiu Road
6	Mei Tao House	Tai Po Road - Tai Wai	6	Wo Che Estate	Yuen Wo Road
7	Tung Lo Wan Village	Tai Po Road - Tai Wai	7	Lek Yuen Estate	Yuen Wo Road
8	Hilton Plaza	Sha Tin Centre Street	8	Shatin Central Bus Terminus	Bus Terminus
9	Shatin Central Bus Terminus	Bus Terminus	9	Royal Park Hotel	Pak Hok Ting Street
10	Lucky Plaza	Wang Pok Street	10	Tung Lo Wan Village	Tai Po Road - Tai Wai
11	Lek Yuen Estate	Yuen Wo Road	11	Mei Lam Estate	Tai Po Road - Tai Wai
12	Wo Che Estate	Yuen Wo Road	12	Tai Wai Market	Mei Tin Road
13	S.L.Y. Bowling Greens	Siu Lek Yuen Road	13	Tai Wai Station Public Transport Interchange	Bus Terminus
14	Fortune City One	Ngan Shing Street	14	San Tin Village	Chui Tin Street
15	Yue Tin Court	Ngan Shing Street	15	Sun Chui Bus Terminus	Bus Terminus
16	Prince of Wales Hospital	Chap Wai Kon Street	16		
17	Yu Chui Court Public Transport Interchange	Bus Terminus	17		
