= Paid area =

Dedicated "inner" zone in a railway station or metro station

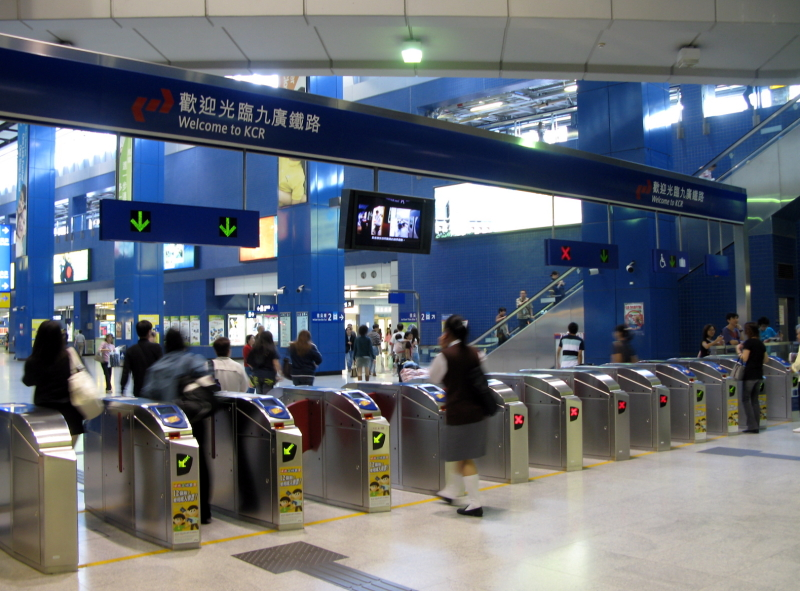
A row of ticket gates at Tai Wai station of Hong Kong KCR (before it was merged with MTR), separating the rest of the station (where the picture was taken) from its paid area.

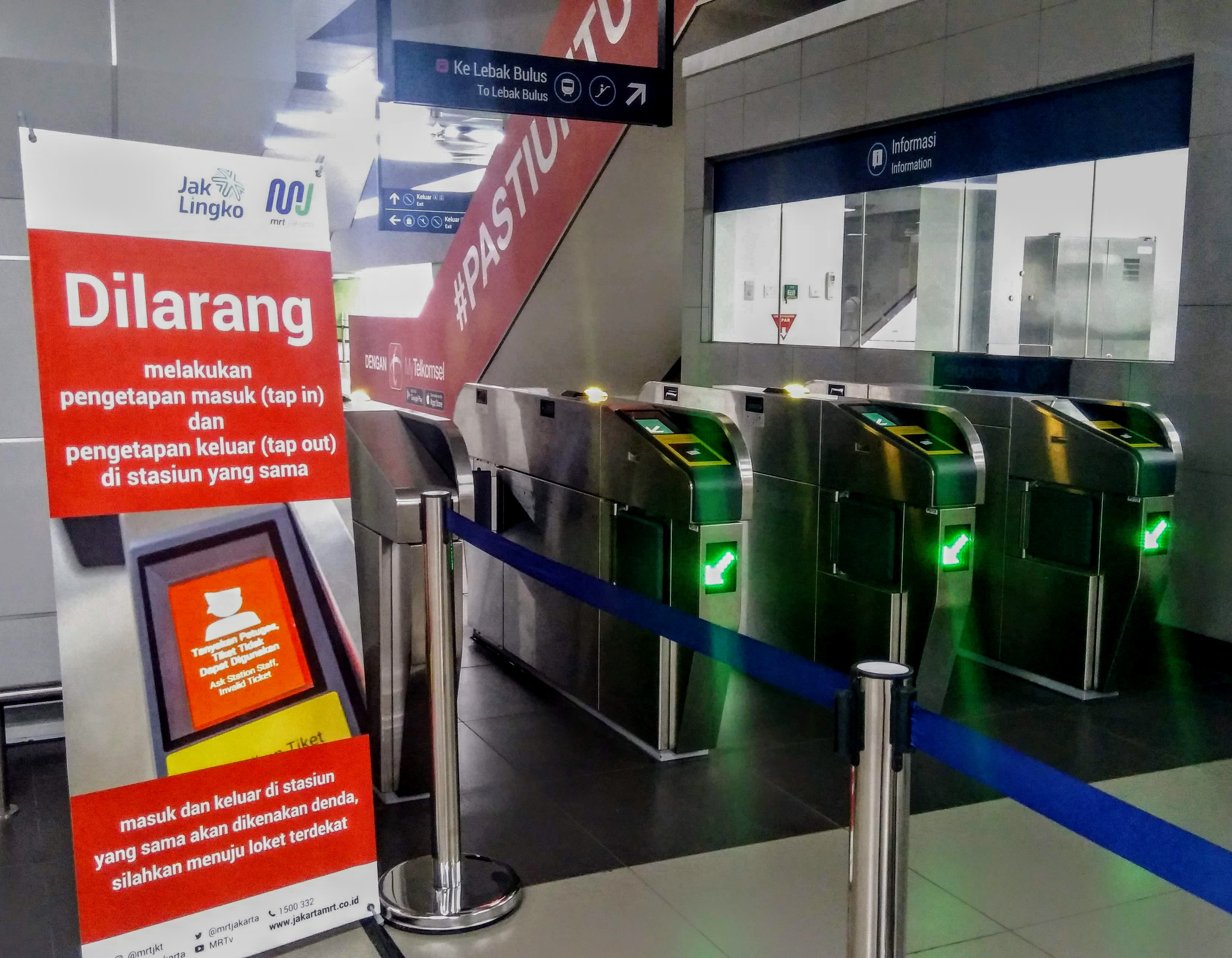
Ticket gate at Blok M MRT station of Jakarta MRT with paid area behind it.

In public transport operations and transport planning, the paid area is a dedicated "inner" zone in a railway station or metro station, accessible via turnstiles or other barriers, to get into which visitors or passengers require a valid ticket, checked smartcard or a pass. A system using paid areas is often called fare control. Passengers are allowed to enter or exit only through a faregate. A paid area usually exists in railway stations for separating the train platform from the station exit, ensuring a passenger has paid or prepaid before reaching the railway platform and using any transport service. Such design requires a well-organized railway station layout. In some systems, paid areas are named differently - for example, on railways in the United Kingdom they are called compulsory ticket areas.

The paid area is similar in concept to the airside at an airport. However, in most cases entrance to the paid area requires only a valid ticket or transit pass. The exception is in certain cases of international rail travel, where passengers must also pass through immigration control and customs to enter the paid area. Examples include the Eurostar international platforms at St Pancras railway station and Gare du Nord, Woodlands Train Checkpoint in Singapore, where the only departures are to neighbouring Malaysia, as well as Hung Hom station, Lo Wu station, Lok Ma Chau station and Hong Kong West Kowloon station in Hong Kong.

== See also ==
- Turnstile
