= Chui Ka (constituency) =

Constituency in the Sha Tin District, Hong Kong

- Elected constituency for the Sha Tin District Council
- Boundary of Chui Ka in Sha Tin District
- District: Sha Tin
- Legislative Council constituency: New Territories North East
- Population: 18,417 (2019)
- Electorate: 11,691 (2019)

Current constituency
- Created: 1991
- Number of members: One
- Member: Vacant

Chui Ka is one of the 38 constituencies in the Sha Tin District in Hong Kong.

The constituency returns one district councillor to the Sha Tin District Council, with an election every four years.

Initially created as Sun Chui in 1991, the current Chui Ka constituency is loosely based on Sun Chui Estate and the area around the Tai Wai station, with an estimated population of 18,417.

== Councillors represented ==
Election	Member	Party
1991	William Wai Hing-cheung	HKAS
1994	William Wai Hing-cheung	Democratic
1994	Lee Kam-ming	Civil Force
2014	Lee Kam-ming	Independent
2015	Li Sai-hung→Vacant	Neo Democrats
2019	Li Sai-hung→Vacant	Independent democrat

== Election results ==
=== 2010s ===
Sha Tin District Council Election, 2019: Chui Ka
Party	Candidate	Votes	%	±%
Ind. democrat	Li Sai-hung	4,854	58.68	+4.98
Civil Force (NPP)	Lam Yu-sing	3,385	40.92	
Nonpartisan	Oscar Lo Chun-man	33	0.40	
Majority		1,469	17.76	
Turnout		8,295	70.97	
Ind. democrat hold		Swing		

Sha Tin District Council Election, 2015: Chui Ka
Party	Candidate	Votes	%	±%
Neo Democrats	Li Sai-hung	2,433	53.7	+7.9
Independent	Lee Kam-ming	1,068	23.7	−30.6
NPP (Civil Force)	Wai Tak-lun	1,029	22.7	
Majority		1,365	30.0	−31.6
Turnout		4,530	47.8	+15.1
Neo Democrats gain from Independent		Swing	+19.3	

Sha Tin District Council Election, 2011: Chui Ka
Party	Candidate	Votes	%	±%
Civil Force	Lee Kam-ming	1,801	54.3	−5.4
Independent	Li Sai-hung	1,519	45.8	+16.5
Majority		282	8.4	−5.0
Turnout		3,320	32.7	
Civil Force hold		Swing		

=== 2000s ===
Sha Tin District Council Election, 2007: Sun Chui
Party	Candidate	Votes	%	±%
Civil Force	Lee Kam-ming	1,587	59.7	
LSD	Li Sai-hung	779	29.3	
Independent	Timothy Wan Yiu-chung	291	11.0	
Majority		356	13.4	
Civil Force hold		Swing		

Sha Tin District Council Election, 2003: Sun Chui
Party	Candidate	Votes	%	±%
Civil Force	Lee Kam-ming	Unopposed		
Civil Force hold		Swing		

=== 1990s ===
Sha Tin District Council Election, 1999: Sun Chui
Party	Candidate	Votes	%	±%
Civil Force	Lee Kam-ming	2,020	66.1	+6.7
Democratic	Timothy Wan Yiu-chung	784	25.6	−15.0
Independent	Hui Yuk-hung	253	8.3	
Majority		1,236	40.5	−2.7
Civil Force hold		Swing		

Sha Tin District Board Election, 1994: Sun Chui
Party	Candidate	Votes	%	±%
Civil Force	Lee Kam-ming	1,455	59.4	
Democratic	William Wai Hing-cheung	994	40.6	+6.2
Majority		461	18.8	+18.5
Civil Force gain from Democratic		Swing		

Sha Tin District Board Election, 1991: Sun Chui
Party	Candidate	Votes	%	±%
HKAS	William Wai Hing-cheung	1,279	34.4	
Independent	Philip Wong Chak-piu	1,267	34.1	
United Democrats	Victor Chou Wing-tat	871	23.4	
Independent	Hui Yuk-hung	299	8.0	
Majority		12	0.3	
HKAS win (new seat)				
