= Sun Chui Estate =

Public housing estate in Tai Wai, Hong Kong

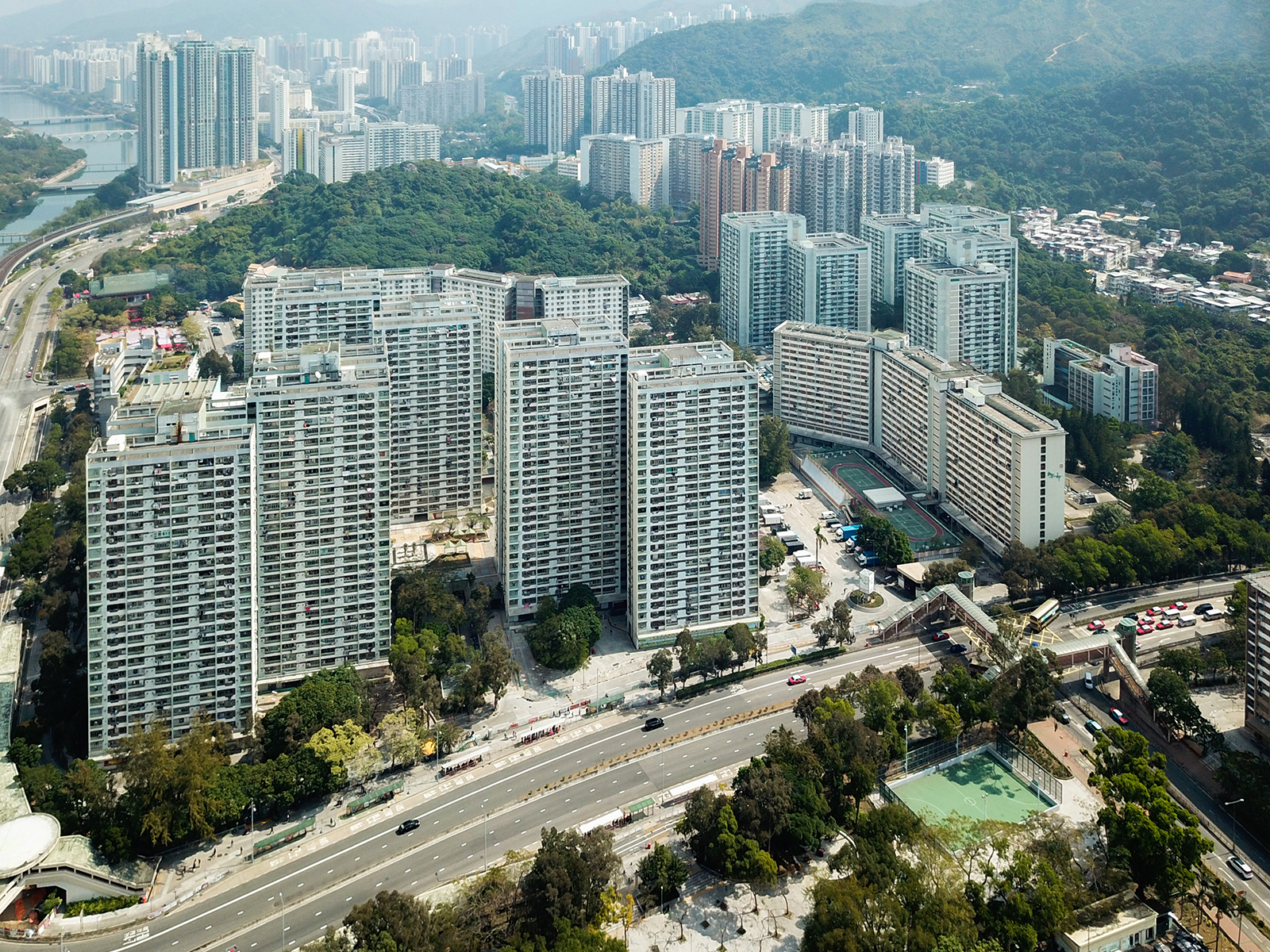
- Sun Chui Estate
- Interactive map of Sun Chui Estate

General information
- Location: 2 Chui Tin Street, Tai Wai; New Territories, Hong Kong
- Coordinates: 22.3713°N 114.18073°E
- Status: Completed
- Category: Public rental housing
- Population: 17,081 (2021)
- No. of blocks: 8
- No. of units: 6,692

Construction
- Constructed: 1983; 43 years ago
- Authority: Hong Kong Housing Authority

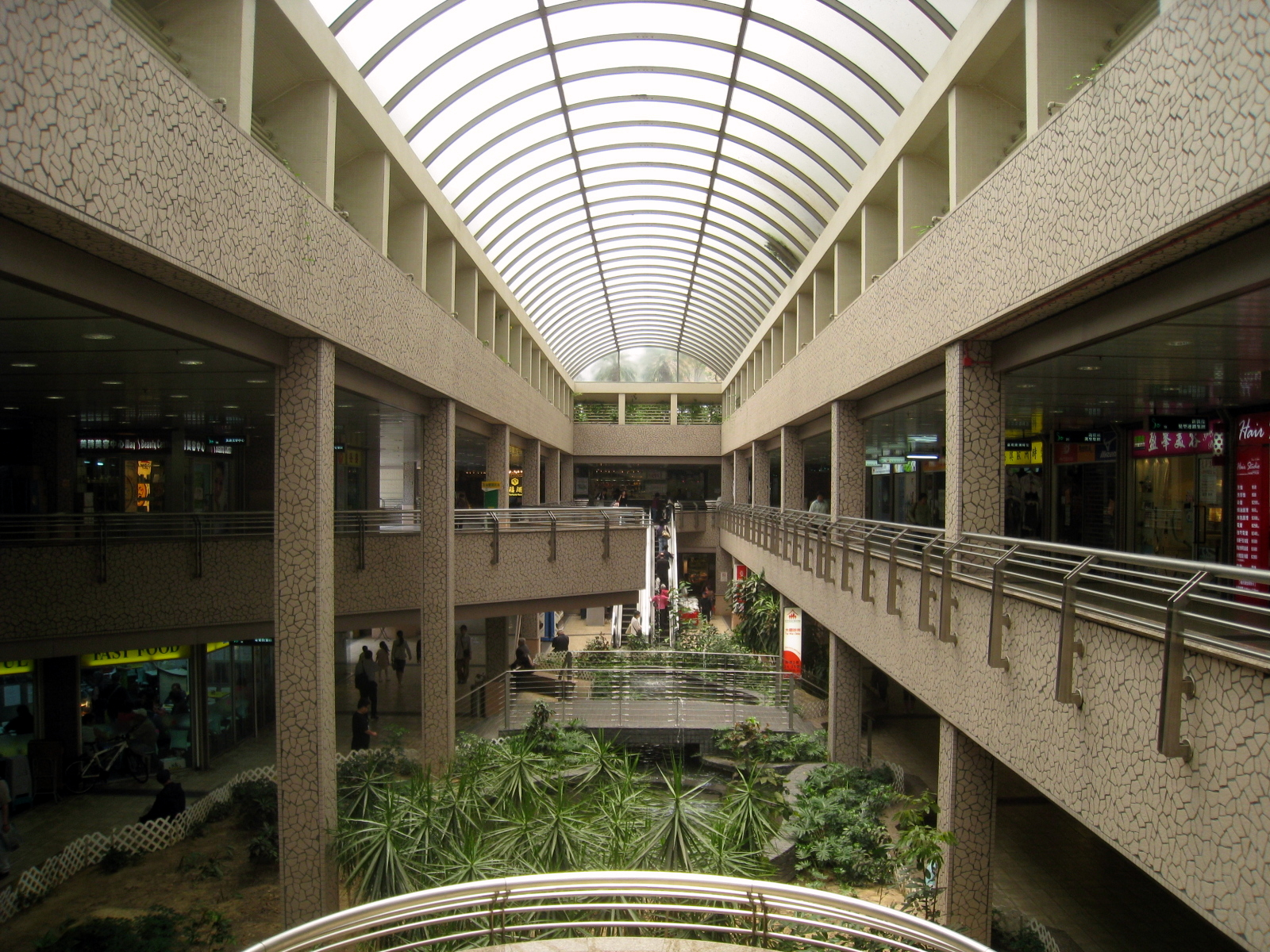
Sun Chui Shopping Centre

Sun Chui Estate (Chinese: 新翠邨) is a public housing estate in Tai Wai, New Territories, Hong Kong near Lung Hang Estate, San Tin Village, The Wai, Che Kung Temple and MTR Tai Wai station. It consists of eight residential buildings completed in 1983, 1984 and 1985 respectively.

== Background ==
The estate was formerly known as Sun Tin Estate. However, in November 1981, it was renamed as Sun Chui Estate.

== Houses ==
Name	Chinese name	Building type	Completed
Sun Ming House	新明樓	Double H	1985
Sun Yuet House	新月樓	Double H	1983
Sun Wai House	新偉樓	Double H	1983
Sun Fong House	新芳樓	Old Slab	1983
Sun Yee House	新儀樓	Old Slab	1984
Sun Chun House	新俊樓	Twin Tower	1984
Sun Hok House	新學樓	Twin Tower	1984
Sun Kit House	新傑樓	Twin Tower	1984

== Demographics ==
According to the 2021 by-census, Sun Chui Estate had a population of 17,081. The median age was 53.0 and the majority of residents (97.6 percent) were of Chinese ethnicity. The average household size was 2.6 people. The median monthly household income of all households (i.e. including both economically active and inactive households) was HK$16,990.

== Politics ==
For the 2019 District Council election, the estate fell within two constituencies. Most of the estate is located in the Chui Ka constituency, which is represented by Li Sai-hung, while the remainder of the estate falls within the Chui Tin constituency, which is represented by Rick Hui Yui-yu.

== See also ==
- Public housing estates in Tai Wai
