= Eddie Lam Yu-sing =

Hong Kong politician

Eddie Lam
- 林宇星

Civil Force Spokesperson
- Incumbent
- Assumed office 2017

Personal details
- Born: 6 March 1992 (age 34) British Hong Kong
- Party: Civil Force/New People's Party
- Education: Hong Kong Polytechnic University
- Occupation: Community Development Officer

Eddie Lam Yu-sing (Chinese: 林宇星; born 6 March 1992 in Hong Kong) is the former deputy executive of Civil Force political party in Hong Kong, and is the current spokesperson and Vice-Chairperson of the New Territories Youth Federation. He previously worked in the China News Service. He was awarded the Secretary of Home Affairs Youth Recognition Scheme in October 2016. He is also a member of the New People's Party as a Pro-Beijing camp politician. In the 2019 Hong Kong local elections, he participated in the Sha Tin District Council Chui Ka election but suffered a severe loss to a Pro-democracy camp opponent.

== Political career ==
In 2019, amidst the ongoing social movement against the 2019 Hong Kong extradition bill, Civil Force alongside the pro-Beijing camp suffered an unprecedented defeat in the District Council elections. The NPP/Civil Force alliance fielded 28 candidates but did not win any seats. Eddie Lam Yu-Sing was among the unsuccessful candidates. As a result, Civil Force were eradicated from all the district councils for the first time since its establishment.

Yu-Sing and party ally Victor Chan regrouped and entered the 2020 Hong Kong legislative election, hoping to emulate fellow NPP members Eunice Yung and the internet celebrity Dominic Lee.

== 2019 Chui Ka Election ==
Sha Tin District Council Election, 2019: Chui Ka
Party	Candidate	Votes	%	±%
Ind. democrat	Li Sai-hung	4,854	58.68	+4.98
Civil Force (NPP)	Lam Yu-sing	3,385	40.92	
Nonpartisan	Oscar Lo Chun-man	33	0.40	
Majority		1,469	17.76	
Turnout		8,295	70.97	
Ind. democrat hold		Swing		

== Communal experience ==
-Vice-Chairman of New Territories Youth Federation

-Vice-Chairman of Shatin West Residents Association

== Social Media Page And Reference ==
- Eddie Lam Yu-sing on Facebook
