= The Wai =

Shopping centre in Tai Wai, Hong Kong

圍方 The Wai

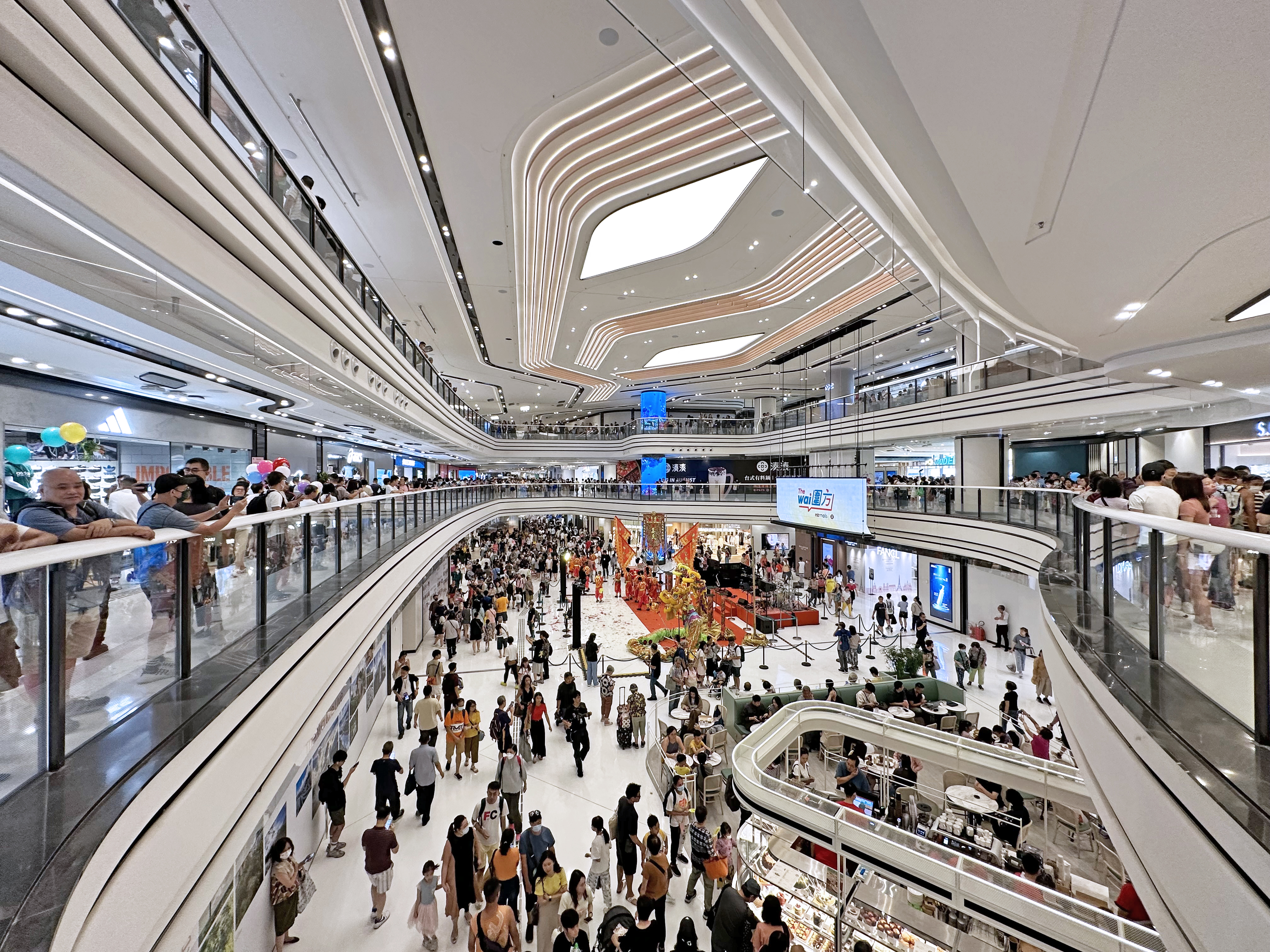
- The Wai on its opening day
- Location: 18 Che Kung Miu Road, Tai Wai, Sha Tin, Hong Kong
- Coordinates: 22°22′20″N 114°10′47″E
- Opened: 22 July 2023; 3 years ago
- Developer: MTR Corporation
- Manager: MTR Corporation
- Owner: MTR Corporation
- Architect: Structure: Ronald Lu and Partners; Internal design: P&T Group
- Num. of stores: 150
- Floor area: 650,000 square feet
- Floors: 4
- Public transit: Tai Wai station (Exits B and H)
- Website: The Wai

The Wai
- Traditional Chinese: 圍方
- Simplified Chinese: 围方
Transcriptions
Standard Mandarin
- Hanyu Pinyin: Wéi Fāng
Yue: Cantonese
- Jyutping: wai4fong1

The Wai (Chinese: 圍方; Jyutping: wai4fong1) is a shopping centre in Tai Wai, Hong Kong, which opened on 22 July 2023. The mall is managed by the MTR Corporation, and is the third largest shopping mall in eastern New Territories.

The mall is located directly under private estate the Pavilia Farm, a property also managed by the MTR Corporation. It is connected to Tai Wai station.

== Design ==
The shopping centre structure was designed by Ronald Lu and Partners, while P&T Group was responsible for interior design. The Wai has four storeys with a total floor area of 650,000 square feet (60,000 m^{2}), including a 50,000-square-foot (4,600 m^{2}) outdoor green area, an indoor car park with 390 parking spaces, and the largest bicycle parking lot in Hong Kong, with 330 bicycle parking spaces. Among the 150 shops in the mall, notable tenants include the largest of the 43 Market Place supermarkets in Hong Kong at the time of its opening, covering an area over 20,000 square feet (1,900 m^{2}) and the Emperor Cinemas Plus+ cinema, the only cinema in Tai Wai, with six theatres and a total of 912 seats. There are eighteen electric vehicle charging stations and solar power facilities.

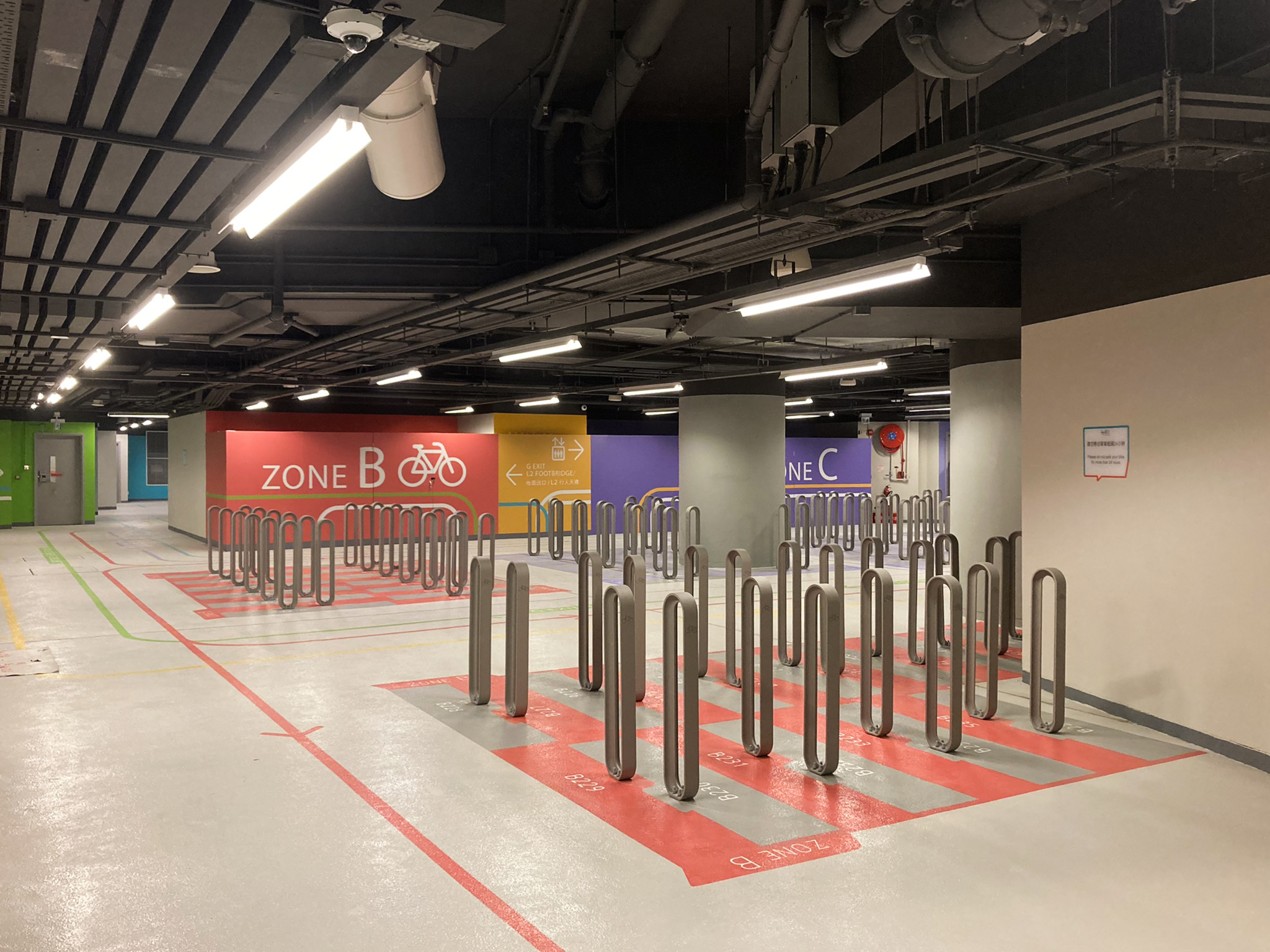
Bicycle parking lot

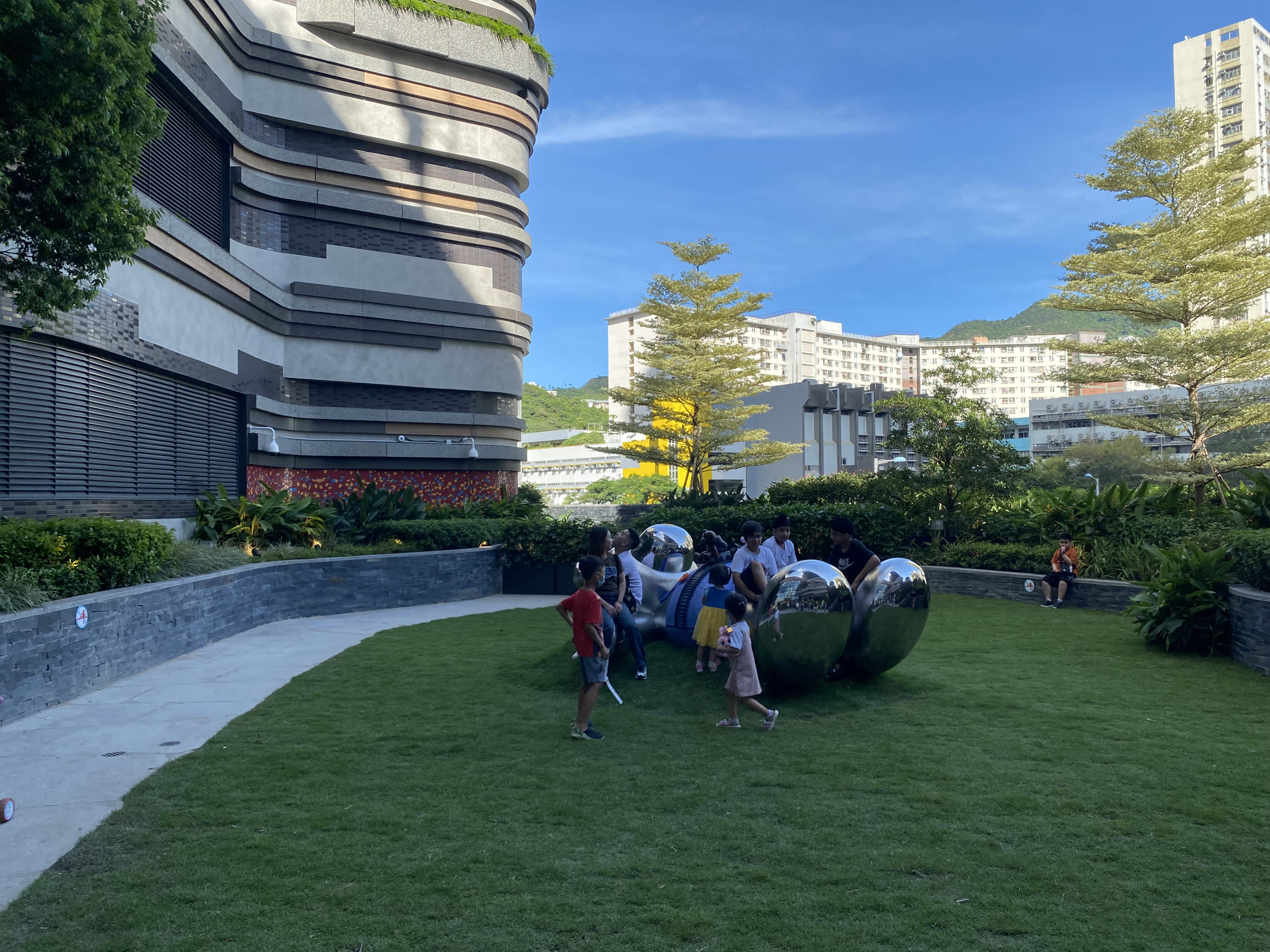
Outdoor green area

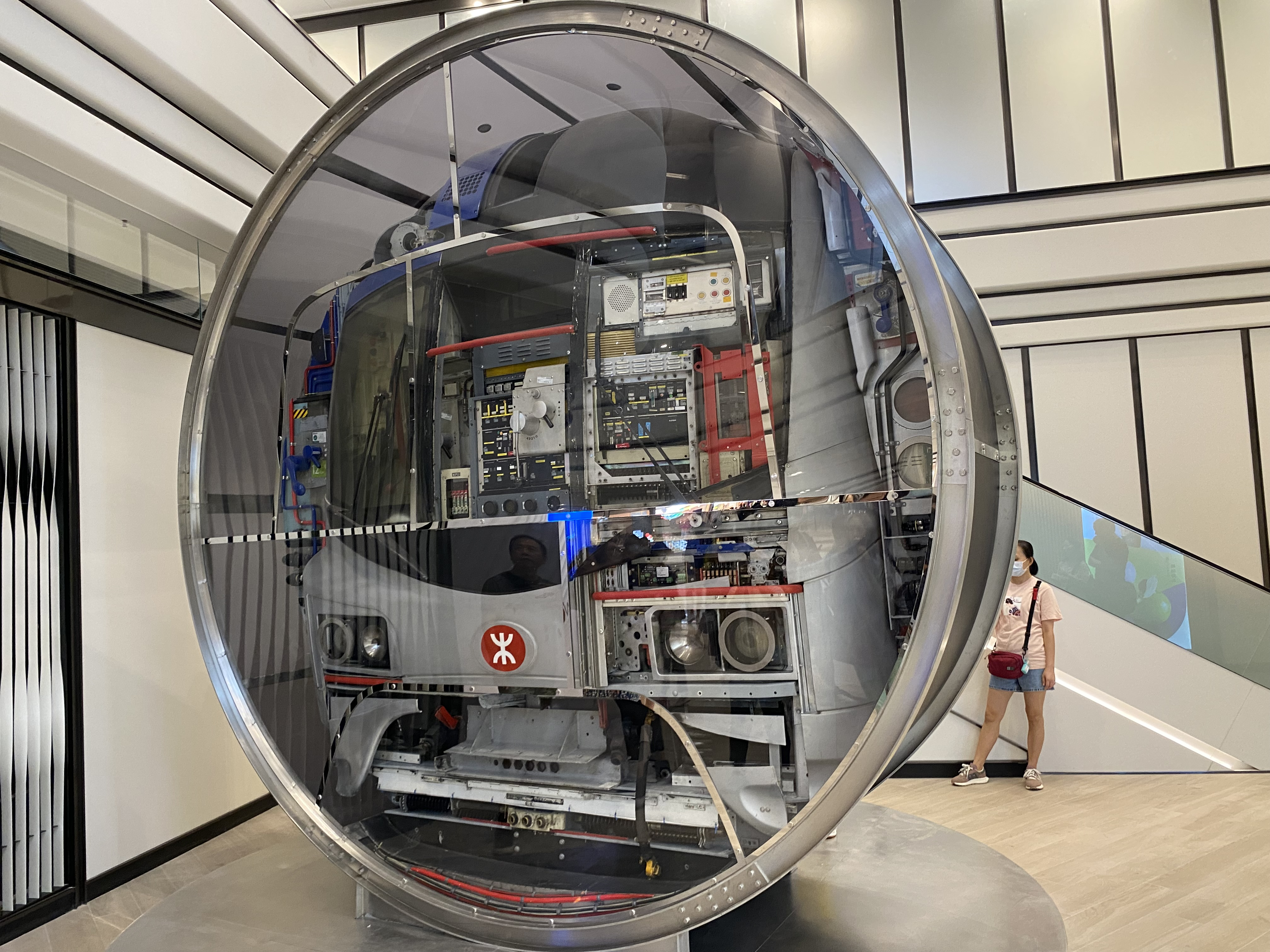
Artwork exhibition

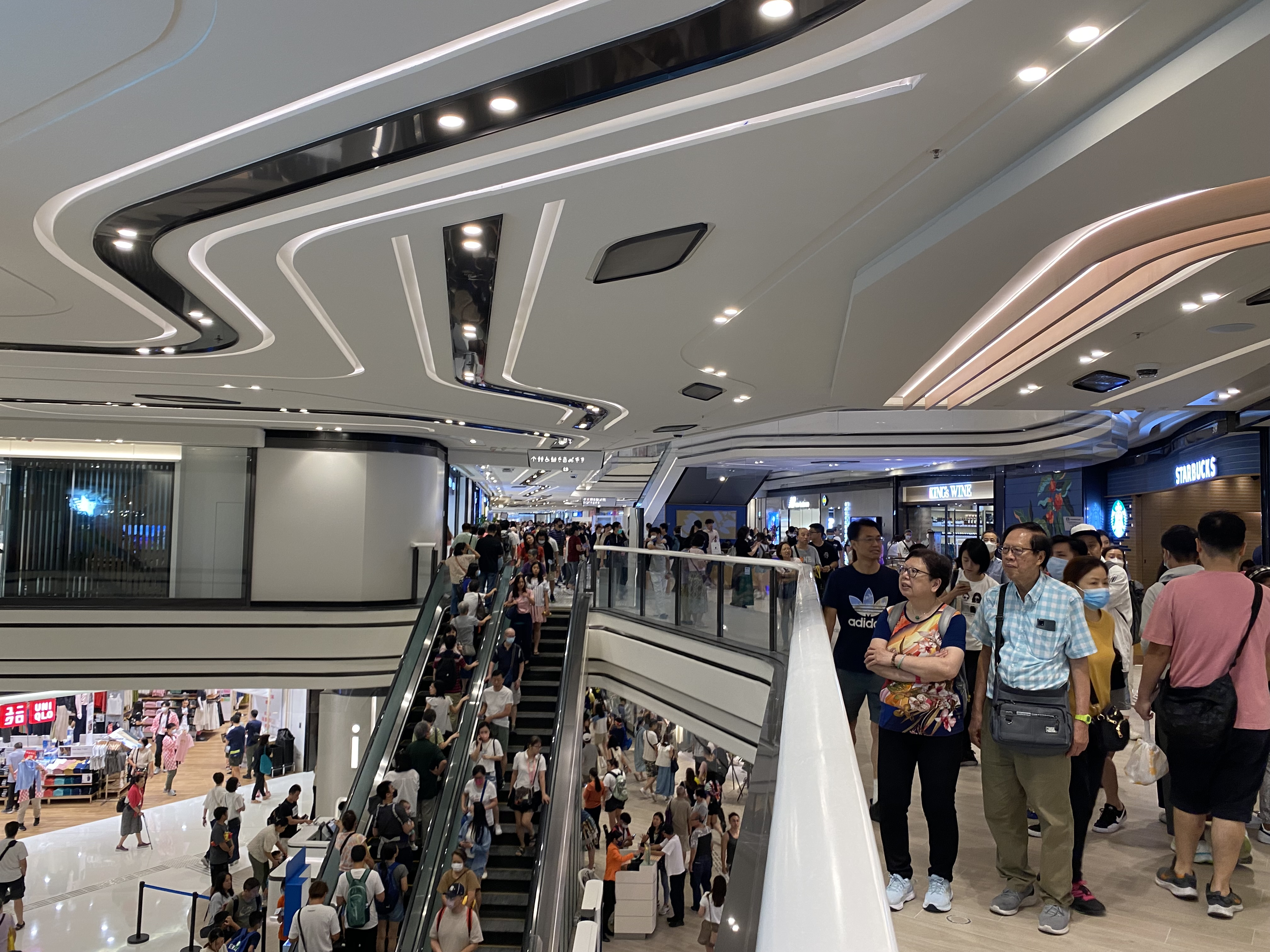
Fourth and fifth floors

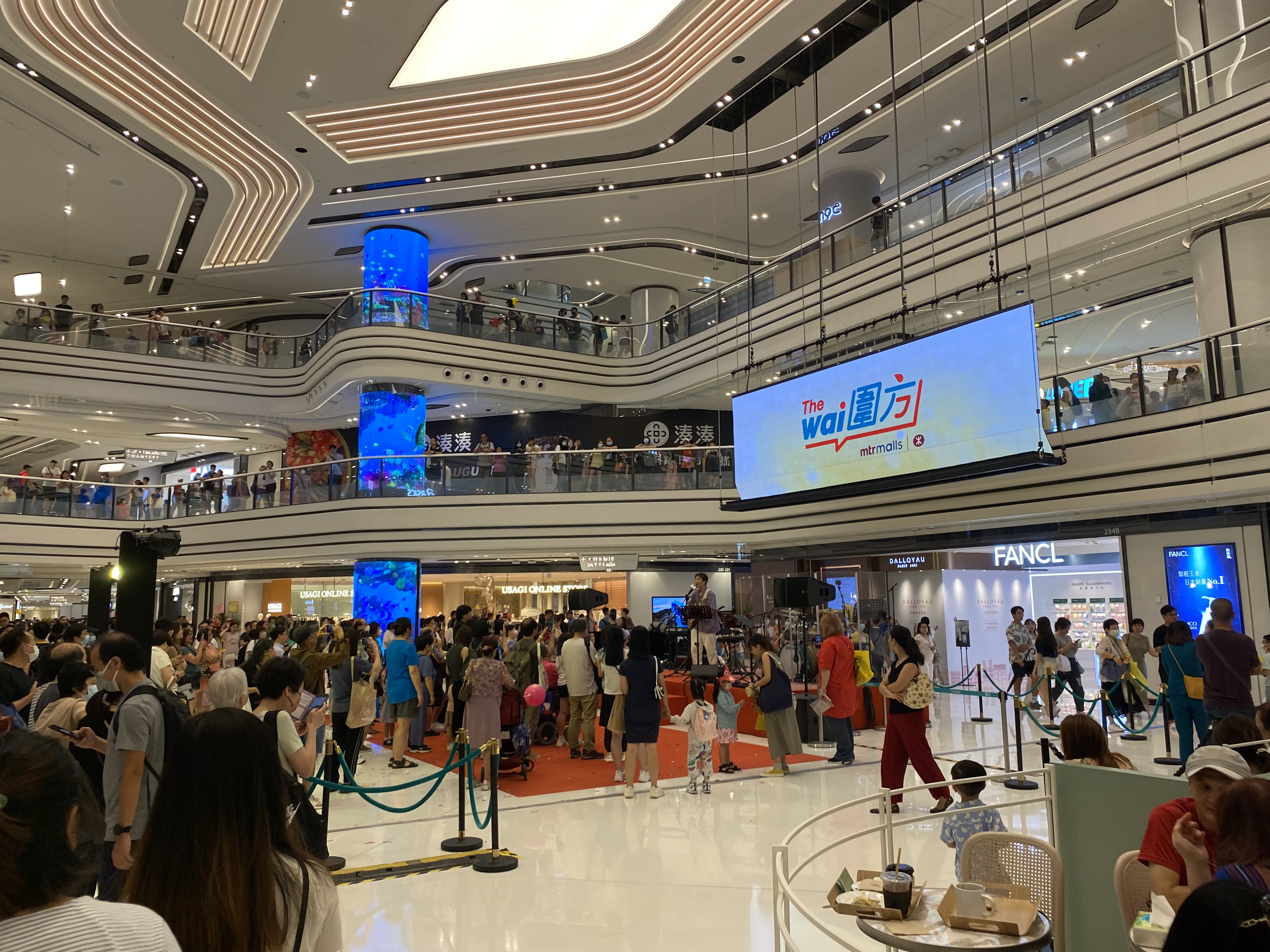
Exhibition area on the second floor

== Connections ==
The shopping mall is connected to three footbridges: one to northern Tai Wai near Che Kung Temple and Sun Chui Estate, one to a complex footbridge, and one directly connected to Festival City, a private estate also owned by the MTR Corporation.

=== Transport ===
Directly below the shopping mall is a public transport interchange with numerous bus and minibus routes in addition to a taxi station. The mall is also connected to Tai Wai MTR station's exit B, while exit H directly connects the third floor of the mall to the elevated platform 3.

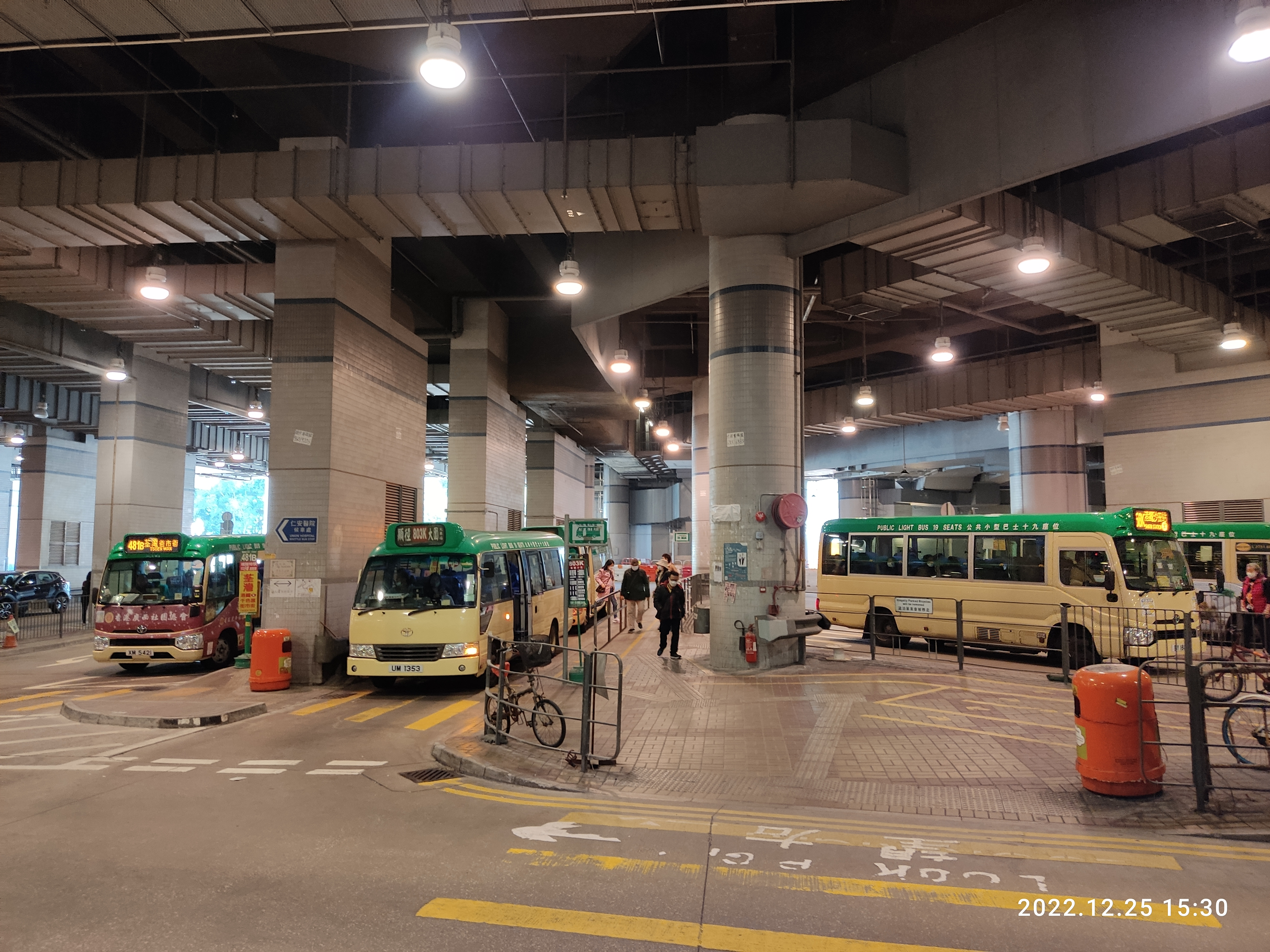
Public Transport Interchange

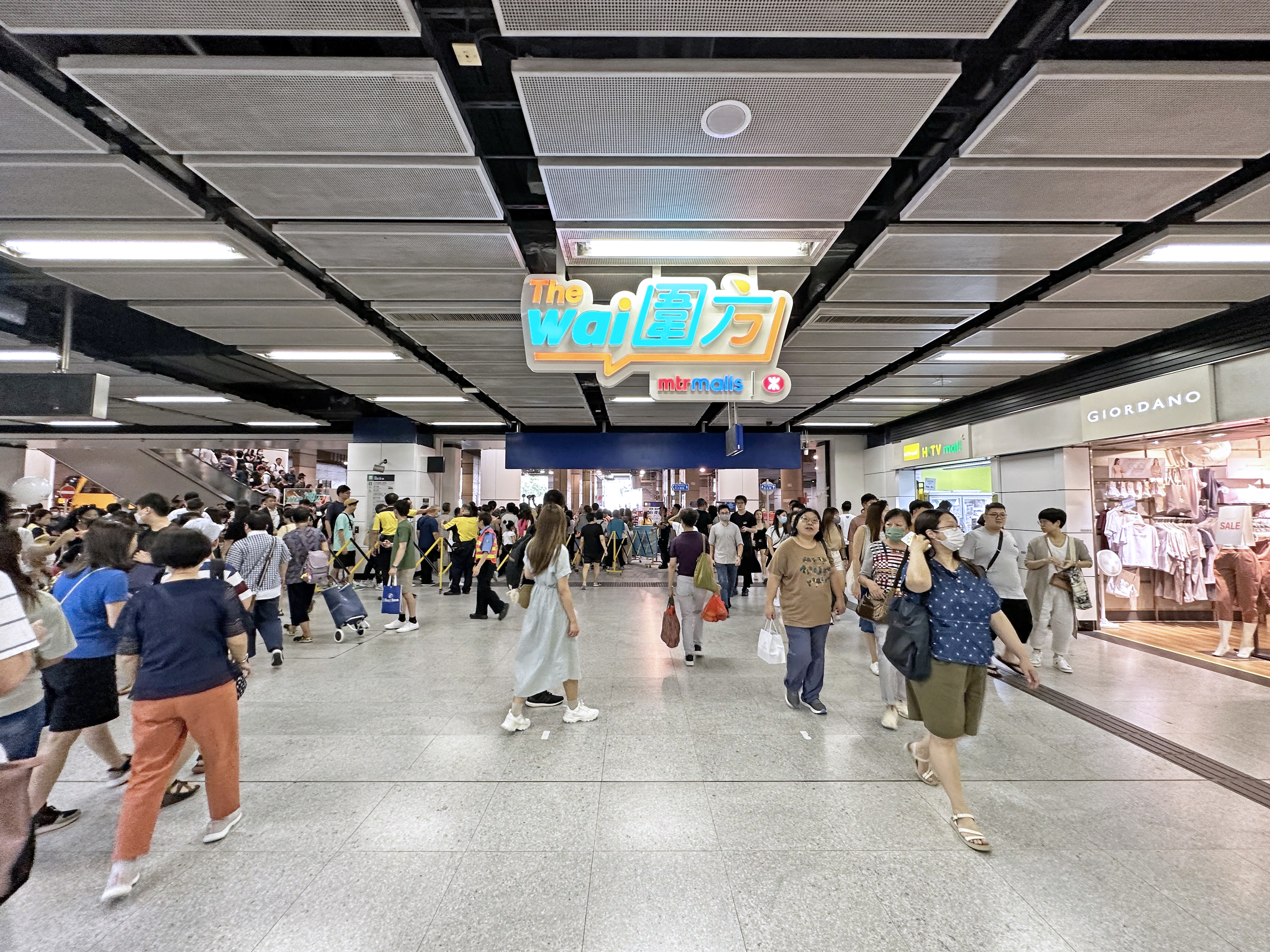
Tai Wai station exit B connected to the mall

=== Controversial demolition of footbridge branch ===
Prior to the mall's construction, a complex footbridge located above a roundabout joining Mei Tin Road, Che Kung Miu Road and Hung Mui Kuk Road connected four sides of the junction. However, one of its branches was called for demolition by the government's construction plan for the mall, which would have redirected pedestrians into the mall for accessing the footbridge. This increased the time to reach the footbridge from the ground, from 20 seconds to more than a minute. The plan was subsequently protested by councilors of the Sha Tin District Council. However, demolition works continued, beginning in 2022 and eventually completing in August 2023.

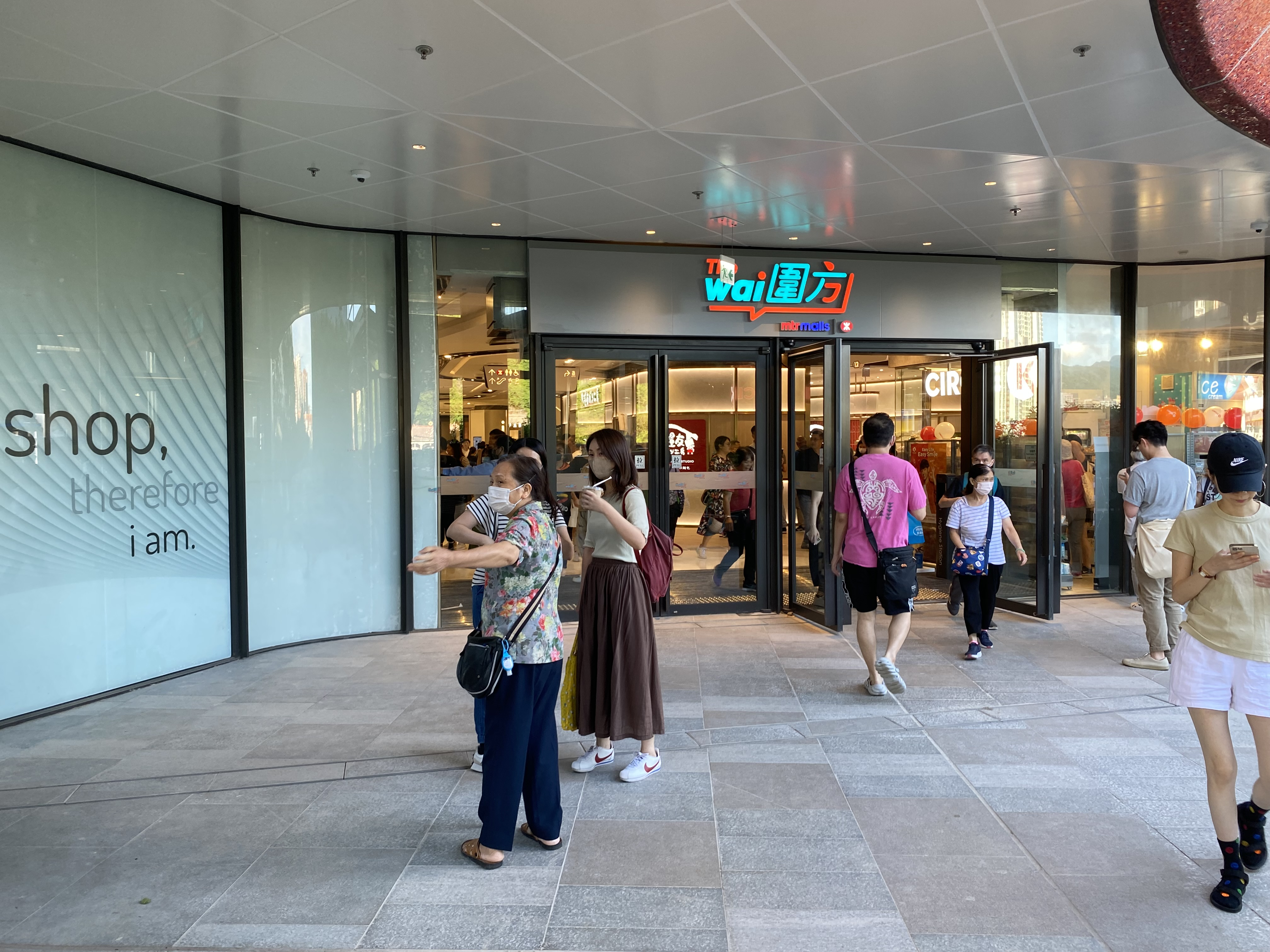
Entrance from the Sun Chui Estate footbridge

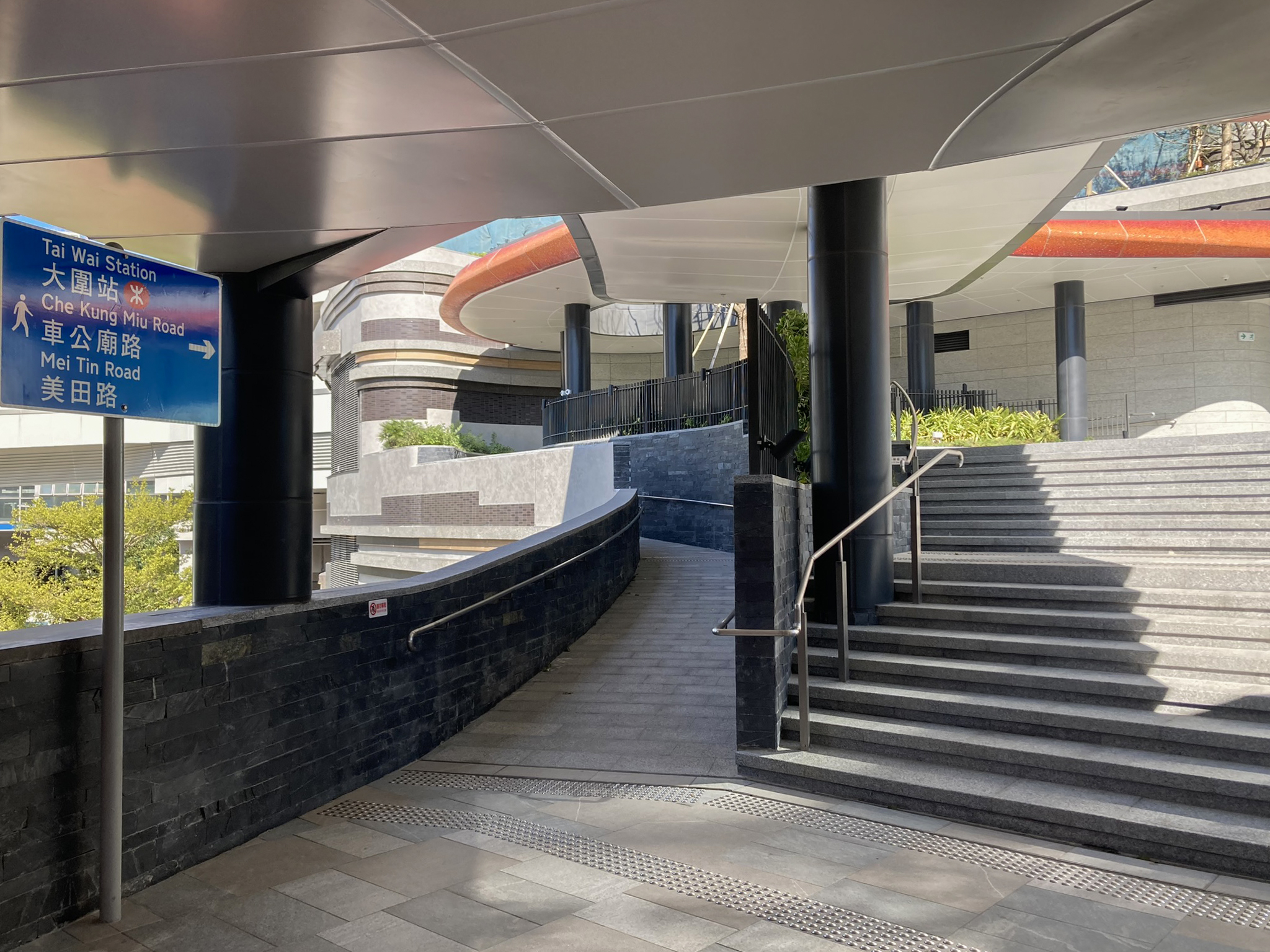
Footbridge users are redirected into the mall

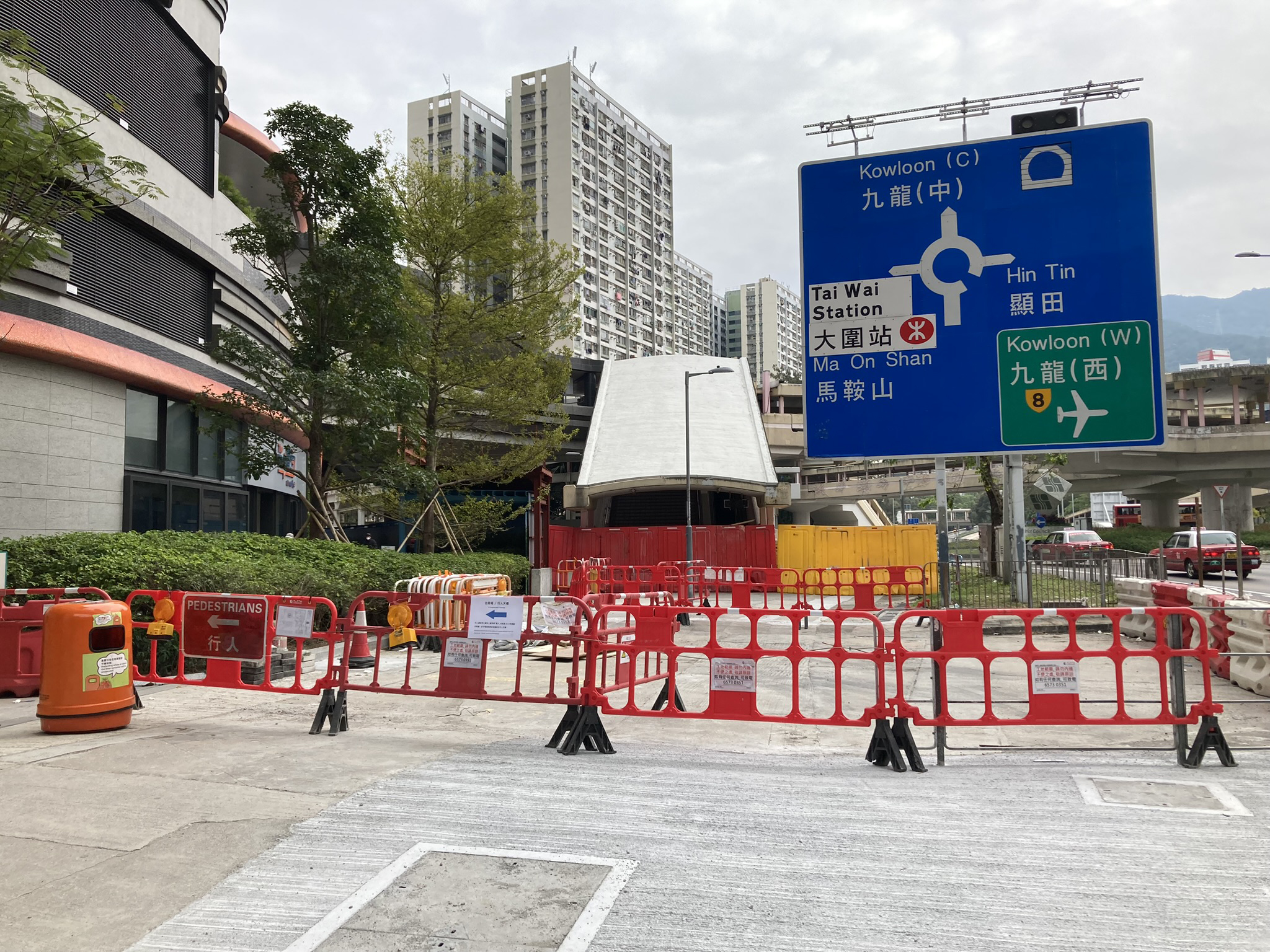
Preparing for demolition

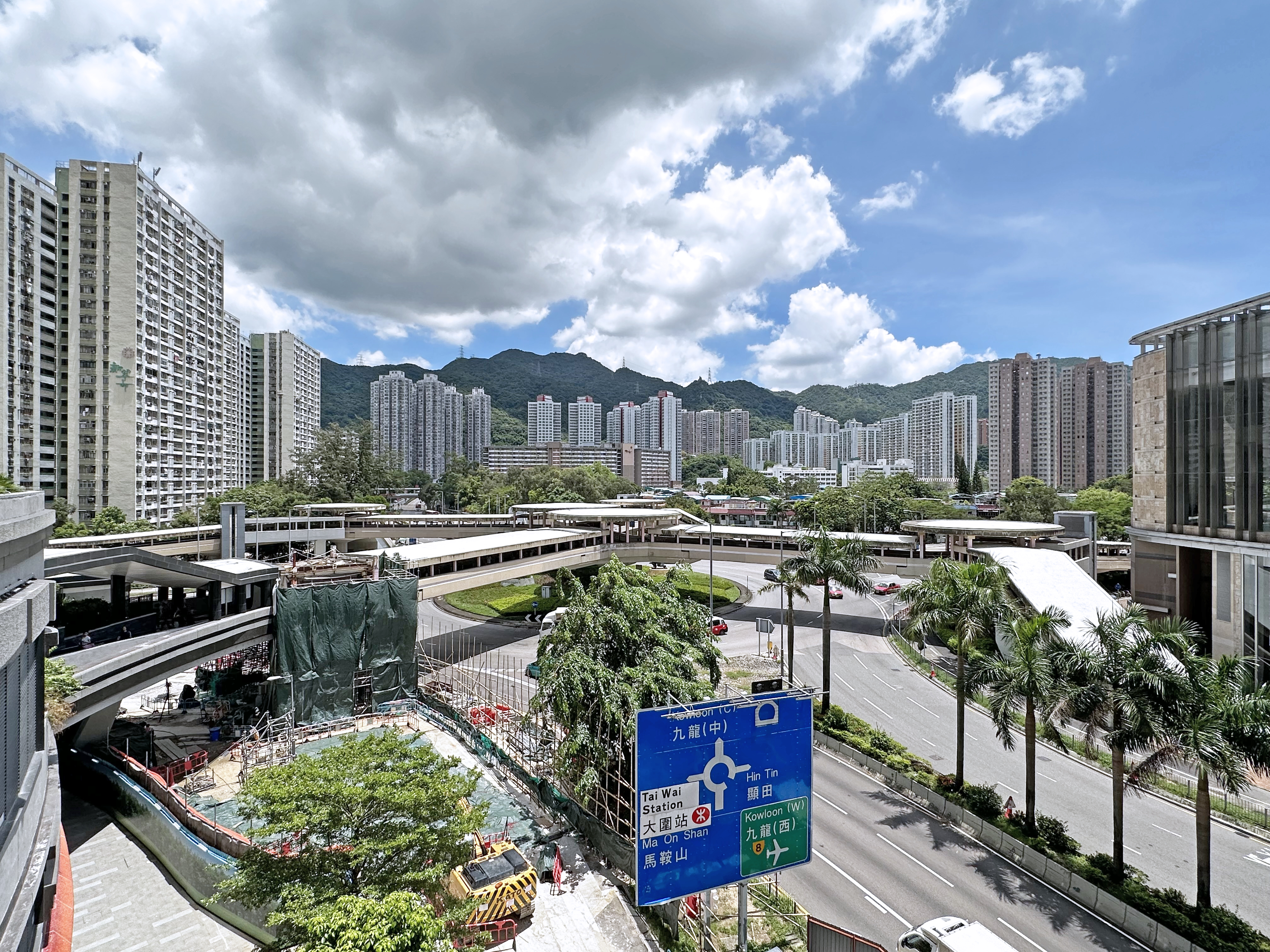
After the demolition

== Incident ==
On 24 July 2023, the third day of the mall's opening, a 64-year-old woman was attacked by two people, who later escaped and have not been arrested. The woman sustained an injury near her eye and sustained injuries to her chest.
