= Tai Wai station =

MTR interchange station in the New Territories, Hong Kong

Tai Wai 大圍
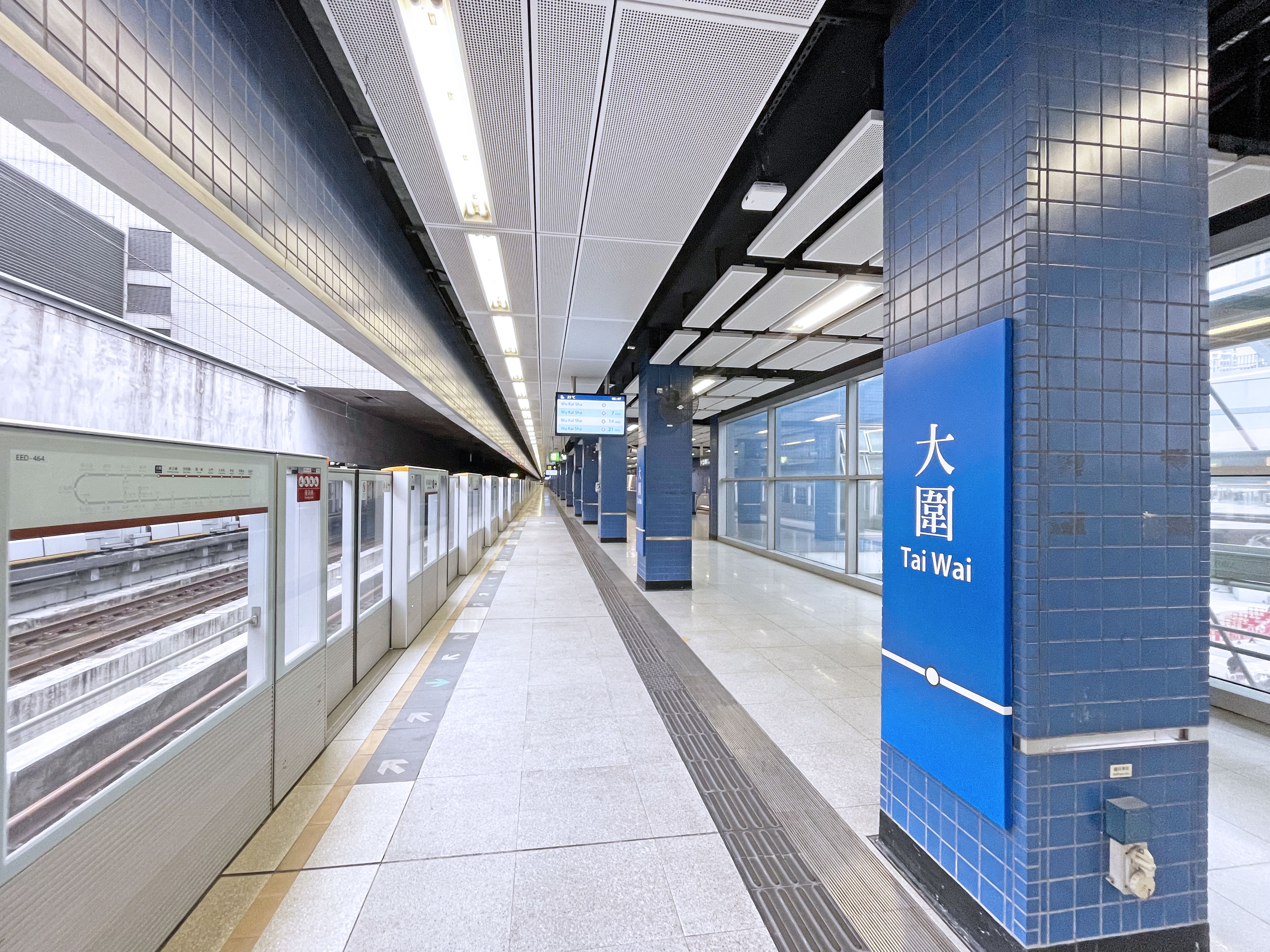
- Platform 4 of Tai Wai station in April 2022

Chinese name
- Chinese: 大圍
- Simplified Chinese: 大围
- Cantonese Yale: Daaih wài
Transcriptions
Standard Mandarin
- Hanyu Pinyin: Dàwéi
Yue: Cantonese
- Yale Romanization: Daaih wài
- Jyutping: Daai6wai4

General information
- Location: Tsuen Nam Road, Tai Wai; Sha Tin District, Hong Kong
- Coordinates: 22°22′23″N 114°10′43″E
- System: MTR rapid transit station
- Owner: KCR Corporation
- Operator: MTR Corporation
- Lines: East Rail line; Tuen Ma line
- Platforms: 4 side platforms
- Tracks: 4
- Connections: Bus, minibus

Construction
- Structure type: Elevated
- Accessible: Yes

Other information
- Station code: TAW

History
- Opened: East Rail line : 15 August 1983; 43 years ago (temporary station building); Ma On Shan line : 21 December 2004; 21 years ago
- Rebuilt: 23 April 1986; 40 years ago

Services
Preceding station	MTR	Following station
Kowloon Tong towards Admiralty	East Rail line	Sha Tin towards Lo Wu or Lok Ma Chau
Hin Keng towards Tuen Mun	Tuen Ma line	Che Kung Temple towards Wu Kai Sha
Track layout
Location
- Location within MTR

Tai Wai station is an interchange station on the East Rail line and the Tuen Ma line of the Mass Transit Railway (MTR) system in Hong Kong. The station is located in Tai Wai, Sha Tin District. Its livery is navy blue.

== History ==
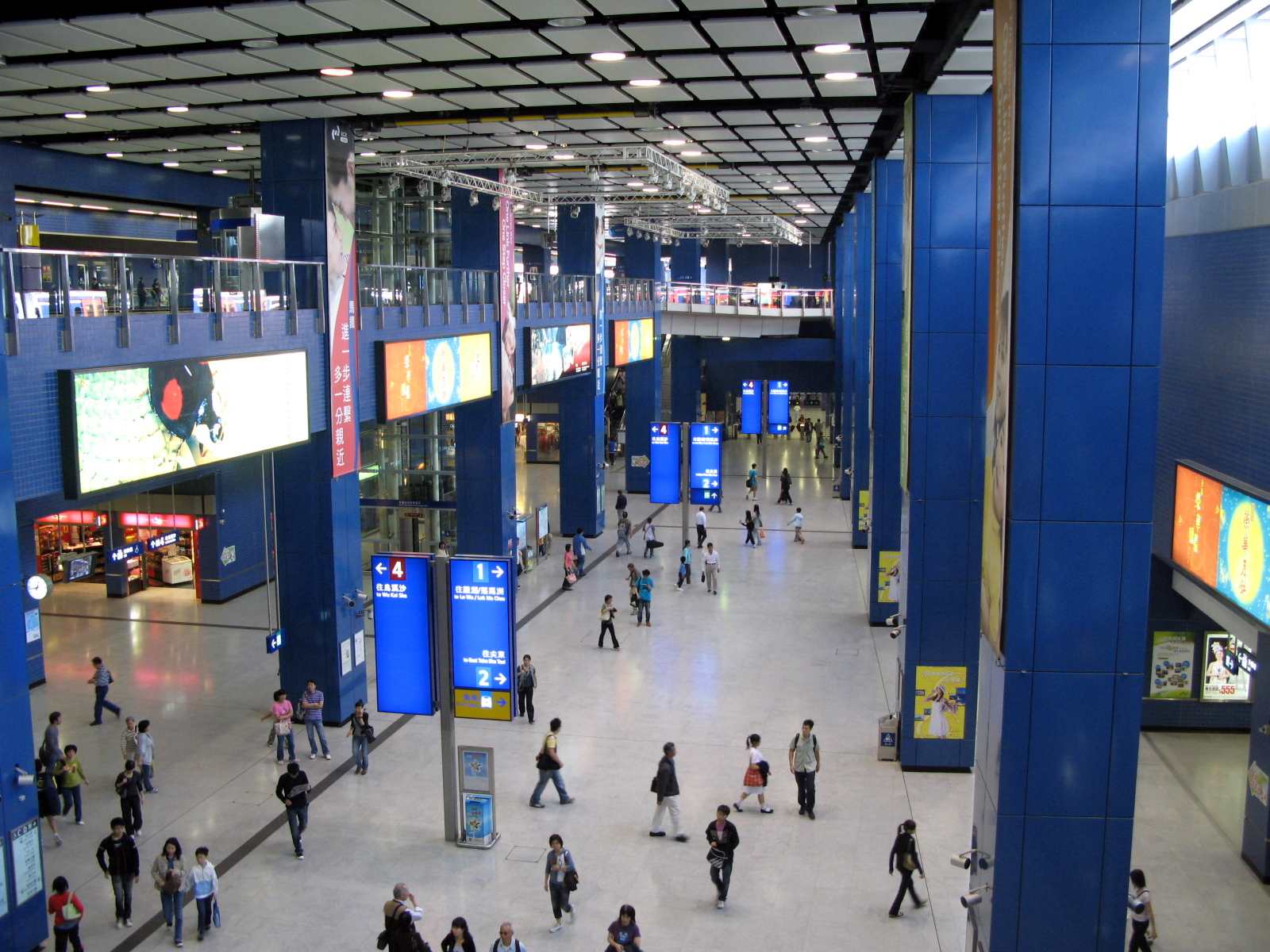
Tai Wai station Concourse in November 2007

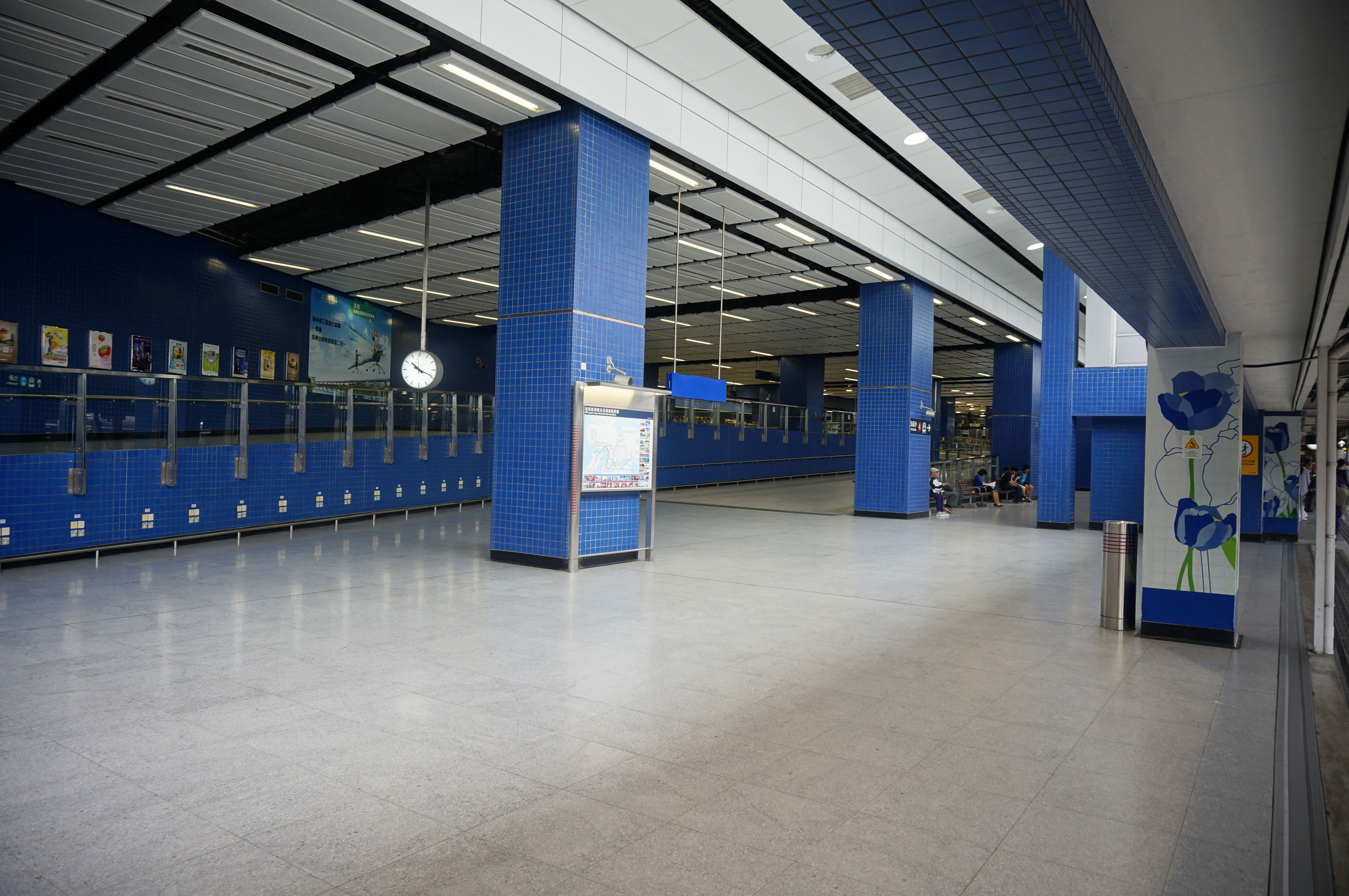
Tai Wai station interchange passageway in April 2014

The first iteration of Tai Wai station along the Kowloon-Canton railway (KCR), which would later be renamed the East Rail line, arose out of a natural disaster, when a temporary station was first constructed at its present-day location in the immediate aftermath of tropical storm Ellen, whose associated torrential rain severely damaged the original masonry arch Bridge No. 11 across Shing Mun River on 25 August 1976. With diesel train services cut between Mong Kok and Sha Tin Stations, it was decided on 28 August 1976 to construct a temporary relief platform at Tai Wai, which was completed in 48 hours and put into operation on 1 September 1976, reconnecting train services to and from Hung Hom Station to the south and supported by connecting shuttle bus services between the temporary station and Sha Tin Station for onward travel to/from Lo Wu. The temporary platform was dismantled following this resumption.

Meanwhile, Bridge No. 11 was demolished and reconstructed to more modern construction standards, enabling a full resumption of end-to-end train services between Hung Hom and Lo Wu on 10 October 1976.

Eventually, plans were made to construct a permanent station at Tai Wai to serve its growing new town population. As a short-term move, construction of a temporary wood-supported station next to Tai Wai Industrial Estate began in November 1982 and it was opened on 15 August 1983 as part of the Kowloon-Canton Railway's greater electrification and double-tracking modernisation programme. The temporary station was located on Shing Chuen Road (成全路), north of the current station on the opposite side of the nullah.

The permanent station was constructed at its present location by Leighton Asia and opened on 23 April 1986 to replace the temporary station.

Further construction began in the new millennium to significantly expand Tai Wai station to serve as the western terminus of the Ma On Shan Rail, a new KCR line built to serve eastern Shatin and Ma On Shan New Town. The line opened on 21 December 2004. The expansion provided for cross-platform transfer from the Ma On Shan Line (westbound) to the East Rail (southbound).

Automatic platform gates were retrofitted on the Ma On Shan line platforms in 2015–2016.

On 14 February 2020, the Ma On Shan line was extended west to a new terminus in Kai Tak, as part of the first phase of the Shatin to Central Link project. The Ma On Shan Line was renamed Tuen Ma Line Phase 1 at the time.

On 27 June 2021, the Shatin to Central Link project was completed with the opening of a new section of rail line through East Kowloon, connecting the Tuen Ma line Phase 1 with the existing West Rail line. The newly unified line was thus renamed to the Tuen Ma Line.

On 26 October 2023, following the opening of a new shopping mall the Wai, exit H was opened, directly connecting platform 3 with the mall.

== Station layout ==
All platforms on the station are side platforms. Platforms 1 and 2 serve the East Rail line and platforms 3 and 4 serve the Tuen Ma line. Platforms 3 and 4 are positioned slightly higher than Platforms 1 and 2.

Platforms 2 and 3 serve southbound trains on the East Rail and Tuen Ma lines respectively and are connected by four large walkways. This makes it possible for southbound passengers to walk directly between the two platforms, without the need to use stairs, escalators, or lifts.

U2; Upper Concourse	Exit H	The Wai
P/U1; Platforms	Exits E and G	Exits, Customer services
P/U1; Platforms	Side platform, doors will open on the left
P/U1; Platforms	Platform 1	East Rail line towards Lo Wu or Lok Ma Chau (Sha Tin) →
P/U1; Platforms	Platform 2	← East Rail line towards Admiralty (Kowloon Tong)
P/U1; Platforms	Side platform, doors will open on the left
P/U1; Platforms	Exit F	Exits, Customer services, passageways
P/U1; Platforms	Side platform, doors will open on the right
P/U1; Platforms	Platform 3	← Tuen Ma line towards Tuen Mun (Hin Keng)
P/U1; Platforms	Platform 4	Tuen Ma line towards Wu Kai Sha (Che Kung Temple) →
P/U1; Platforms	Side platform, doors will open on the right
C Concourse (Ground)	Concourse	Exits, transport interchange
C Concourse (Ground)	Concourse	Customer services, toilets
C Concourse (Ground)	Concourse	Shops, vending machines, ATMs

=== Entrances/exits ===
- A: Tsuen Nam Road
- B: Public Transport Interchange, The Wai
- C: Mei Tin Road
- D: Grandway Garden
- E: Holford Garden
- F: Mei Tin Road
- G: Chik Wan Street
- H: The Wai

== See also ==
- Sha Tin to Central Link
- The Wai
