= City University of Hong Kong =

Public university in Kowloon, Hong Kong

Coordinates: 22°20′11.12″N 114°10′22.76″E

- 香港城市大學
- Other name: CityUHK
- Motto: Officium et Civitas (Latin) 敬業樂群 (Chinese)
- Type: Public
- Established: 1 January 1984; 42 years ago (as City Polytechnic of Hong Kong); 1994; 32 years ago (as City University of Hong Kong)
- Academic affiliations: IAU; ASAIHL; BHUA; GHMUA; UAiTED
- Chairman: Michael Ngai
- Chancellor: John Lee Ka-chiu
- President: Chun-Sing Lee (acting)
- Provost: Chun-Sing Lee (Acting)
- Location: Tat Chee Avenue, Kowloon Tong, Kowloon, Hong Kong
- Campus: Urban, 15.6 hectares (39 acres)
- Language: English
- Website: cityu.edu.hk cityu.hk

Chinese name
- Traditional Chinese: 香港城市大學
- Simplified Chinese: 香港城市大学
Transcriptions
Standard Mandarin
- Hanyu Pinyin: Xiānggǎng Chéngshì Dàxué
Yue: Cantonese
- Yale Romanization: Hēunggóng Sìhngsíh Daaihhohk
- Jyutping: Hoeng1gong2 Sing4si5 Daai6hok6
- IPA: [hœŋ˥.kɔŋ˧˥ sɪŋ˩.si˩˧ taj˨.hɔk̚˨]

The City University of Hong Kong (CityUHK) is a public university in Kowloon Tong, Kowloon, Hong Kong. It was founded in 1984 as the City Polytechnic of Hong Kong and formally established as the City University of Hong Kong in 1994.

The university currently has 11 colleges and schools offering courses in business, computing, science, engineering, liberal arts and social sciences, law, and veterinary medicine, along with the Chow Yei Ching School of Graduate Studies, CityU Shenzhen Research Institute, and Hong Kong Institute for Advanced Study.

== History ==
City University's origins lie in the calls for a "second polytechnic" in the years following the 1972 establishment of the Hong Kong Polytechnic. In 1982, Executive Council member Chung Sze-yuen spoke of a general consensus that "a second polytechnic of similar size to the first should be built as soon as possible." District administrators from Tuen Mun and Tsuen Wan lobbied the government to build the new institution in their respective new towns. The government instead purchased temporary premises at the new Argyle Centre Tower II in Mong Kok, a property developed by the Mass Transit Railway Corporation in concert with the then-Argyle station. The new school was called City Polytechnic of Hong Kong, a name chosen among nearly 300 suggestions made by members of the public.

The new polytechnic opened on 8 October 1984, welcoming 480 full-time and 680 part-time students. The provision for part-time students contributed to high enrolment, with the quota being filled almost immediately.

A tract of land on the former site of a village named Chu Koo Chai was chosen for the new campus. The architectural contract to design the campus was won by Percy Thomas Partnership in association with Alan Fitch and W.N. Chung. It was originally stated to open by October 1988. The first phase was officially opened by Governor Wilson on 15 January 1990, and boasted 14 lecture theatres and 1,500 computers. By 1991, the school had over 8,000 full-time students and approximately 3,000 part-time students. The second phase of the permanent campus opened 1993.

In 1994, the institution was elevated to university status, adopting its current name in recognition of the designation.

In September 2024, CityU (Dongguan) was opened, the campus is located in the Songshan Lake High-Tech Industrial Development Zone (Science City). For the first cohort, the University offers four undergraduate programmes – (1) computer science and technology, (2) intelligent manufacturing engineering, (3) materials science and engineering, and (4) energy and power engineering – and six master's programmes: (1) computer science, (2) engineering management, (3) materials engineering and nanotechnology, (4) business information systems, (5) data science, and (6) electronic information engineering.

== Campus ==
City University of Hong Kong occupies an urban campus located in Kowloon. The official address is Tat Chee Avenue, Kowloon Tong, Kowloon. Administratively, it is part of Sham Shui Po District. Certain buildings of the main campus are marked as located in the Shek Kip Mei neighbourhood instead of Kowloon Tong in the official address book, such as Nam Shan Building.

The main campus is connected to the Festival Walk shopping centre and the Kowloon Tong MTR station, which serves the East Rail line and Kwun Tong line of Hong Kong's Mass Transit Railway (MTR) system. It is also adjacent to Shek Kip Mei Park and Nam Shan Estate.

The main campus covers around 15.6 ha (39 acres).

CityU Campus

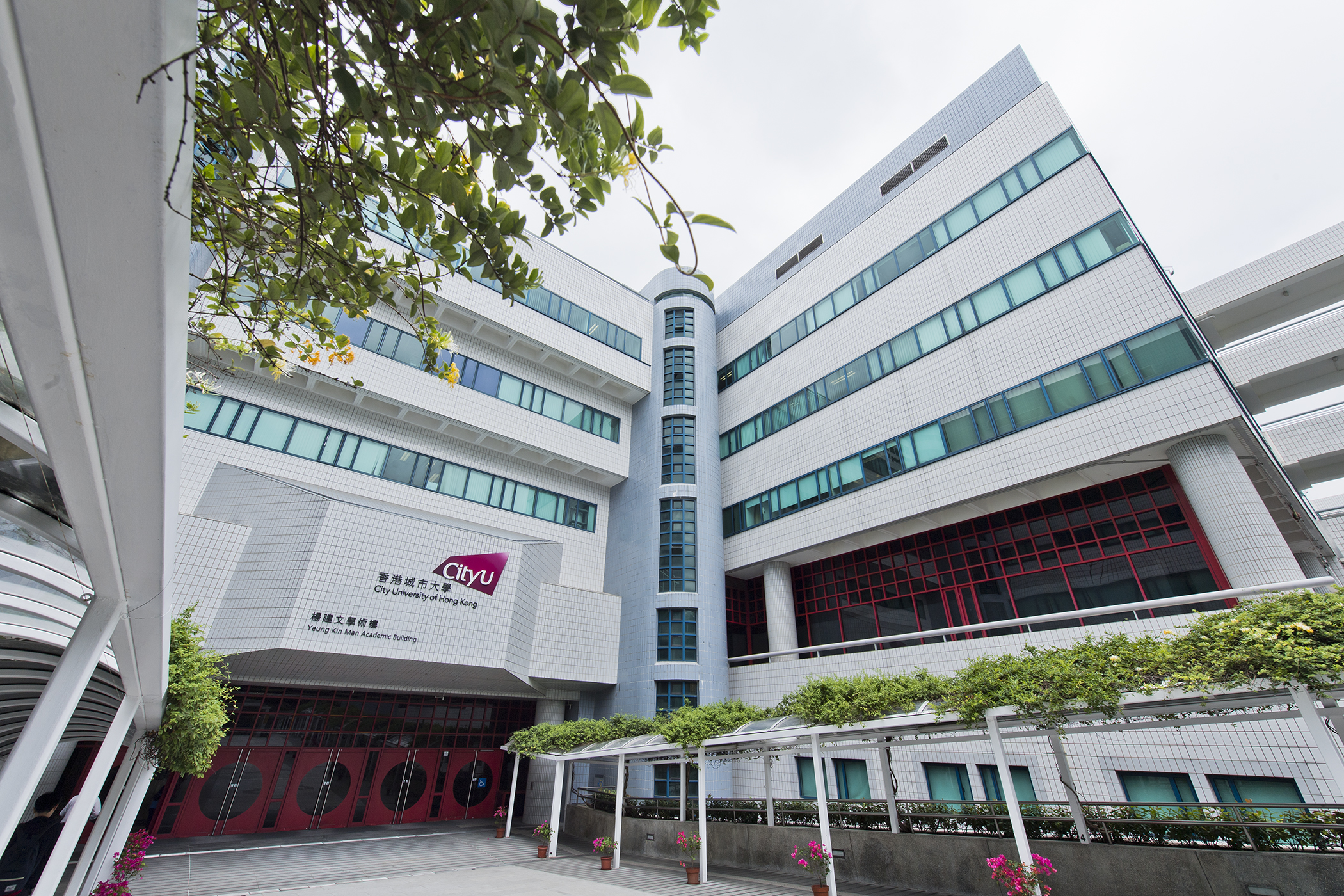
Main Entrance from Tat Chee Avenue

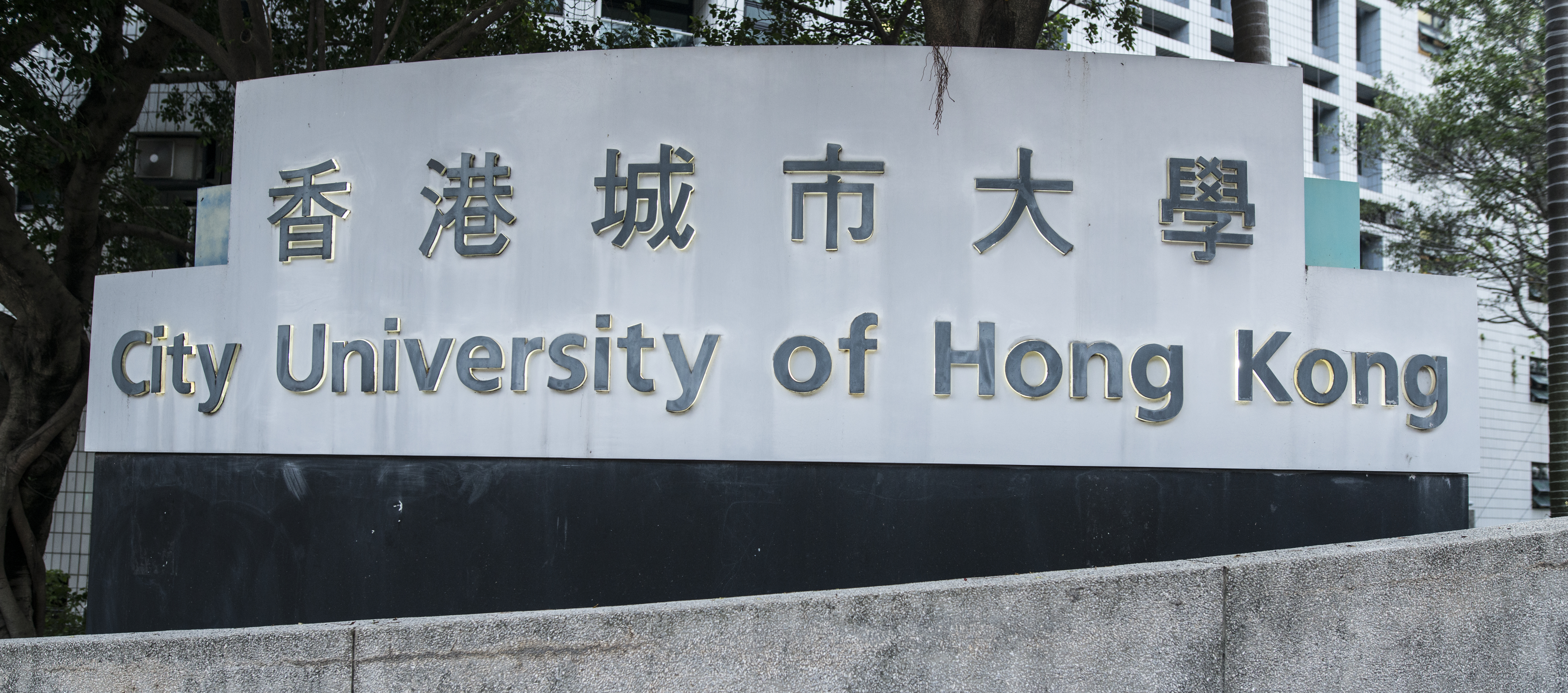
Logo

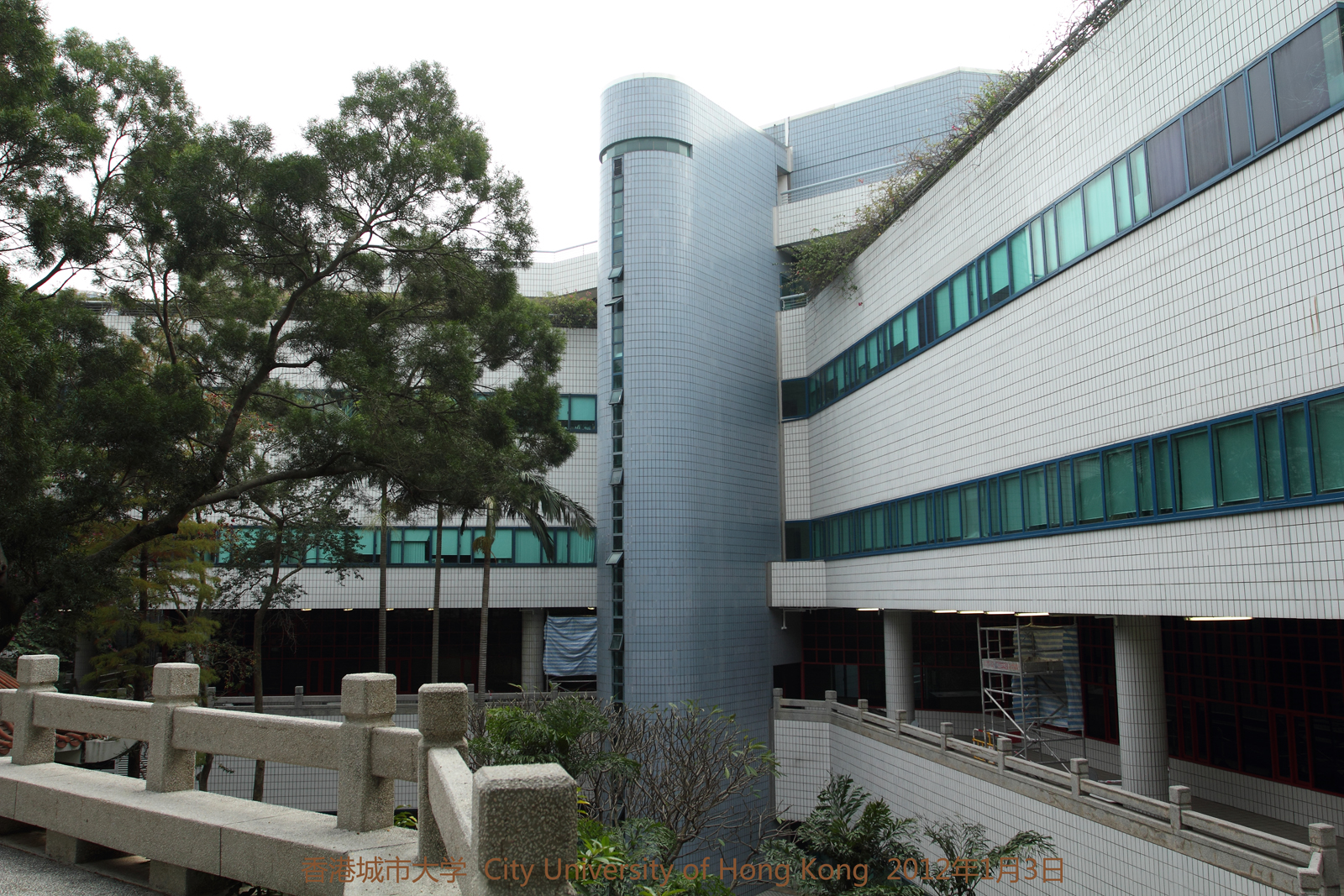
Buildings

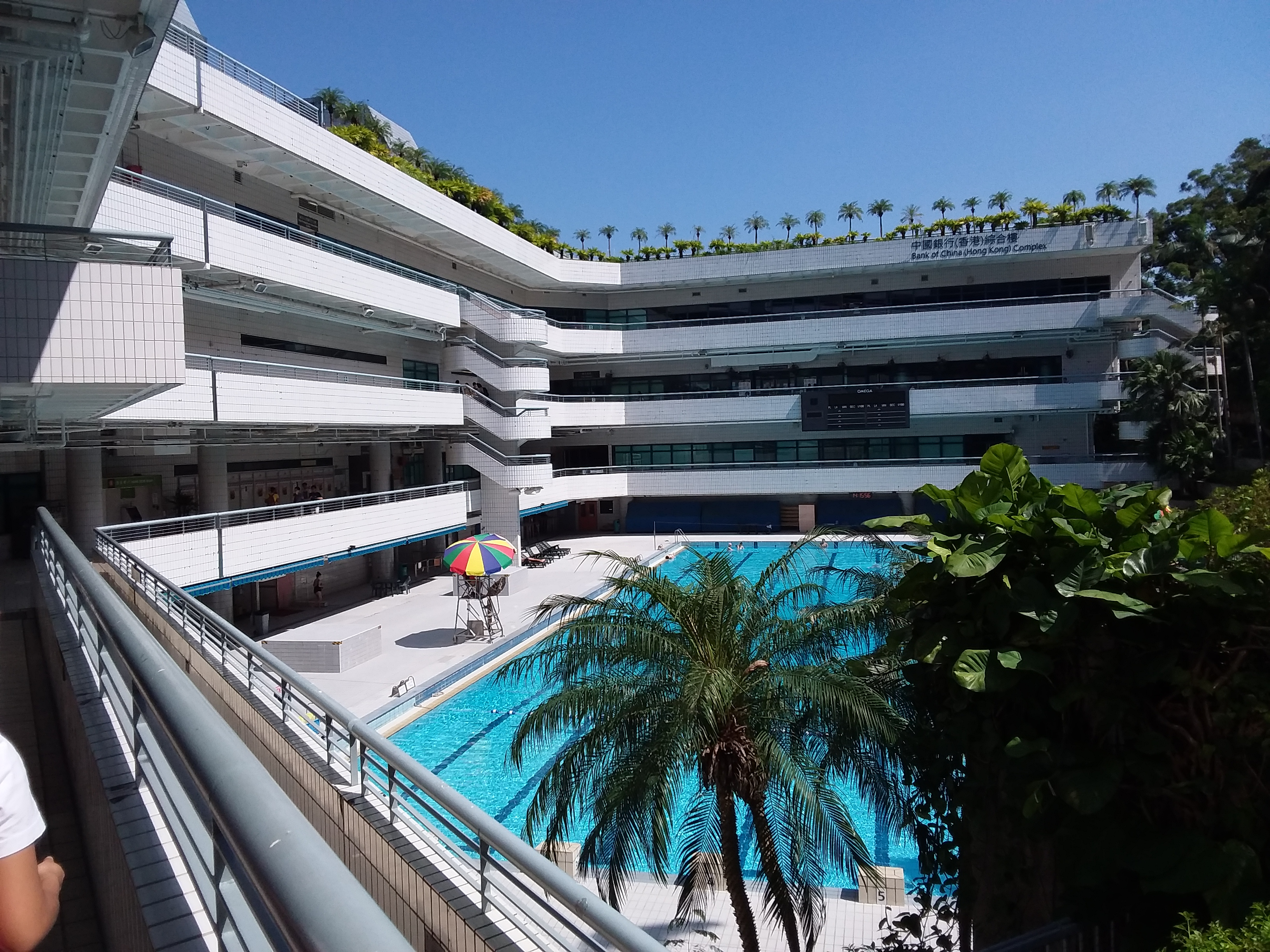
Swimming Pool, 2019

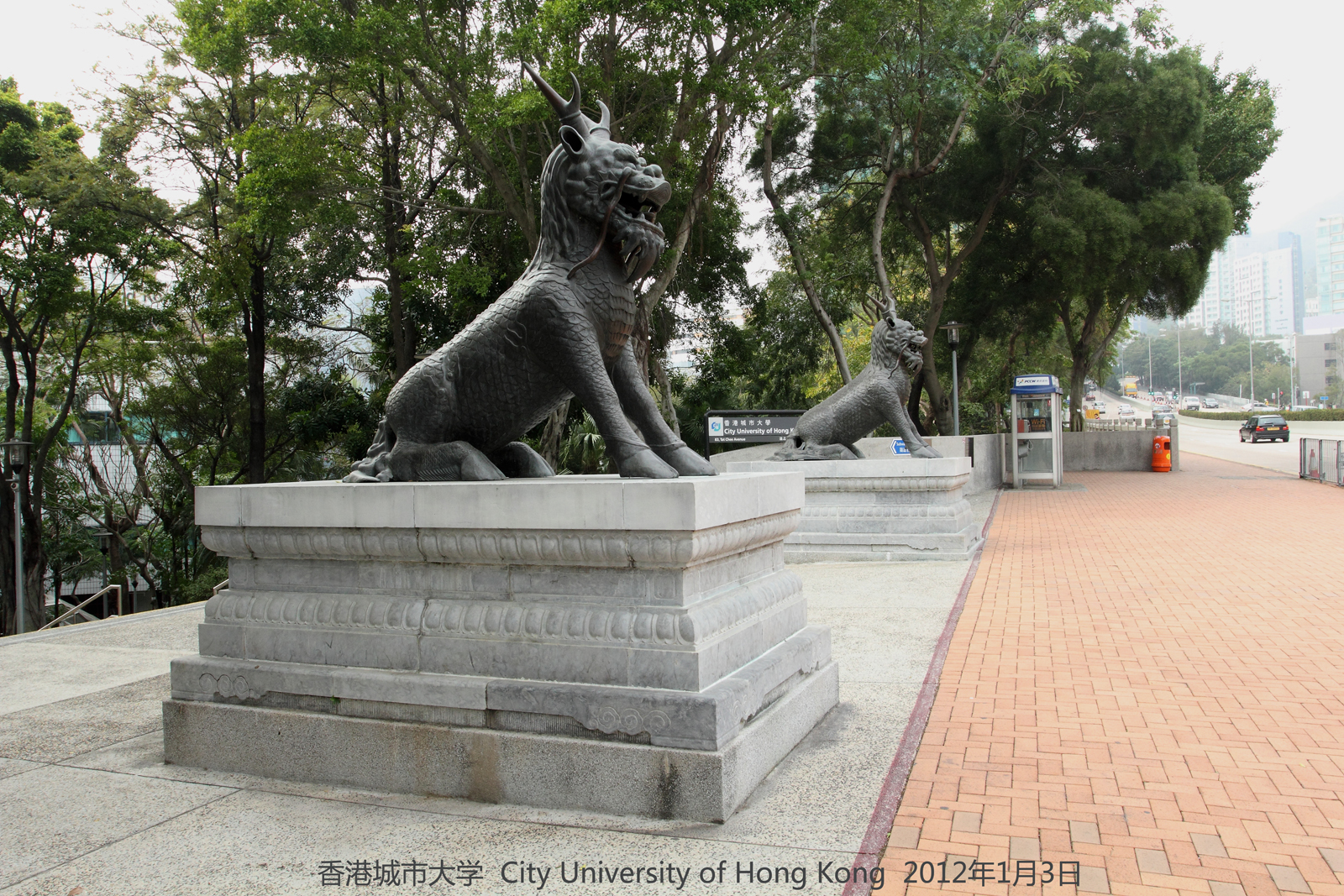
Kirin sculptures near the main entrance

=== Yeung Kin Man Academic Building (YEUNG) ===
Yeung Kin Man Academic Building, formerly known as Academic 1, was also called "Academic Building" before the completion of Academic 2. It was completed in stages from 1989 to 1994. The floor area is 63,000 m^{2} (680,000 sq ft), and includes 116 laboratories, 18 lecture halls, classrooms and canteens. The building is divided by colour, in order of purple zone (P), green zone (G), blue zone (B), yellow zone (Y) and red zone (R). Except for the lecture halls, all classrooms and laboratories are numbered by their colour divisions.

Yeung Kin Man Academic Building, CityU

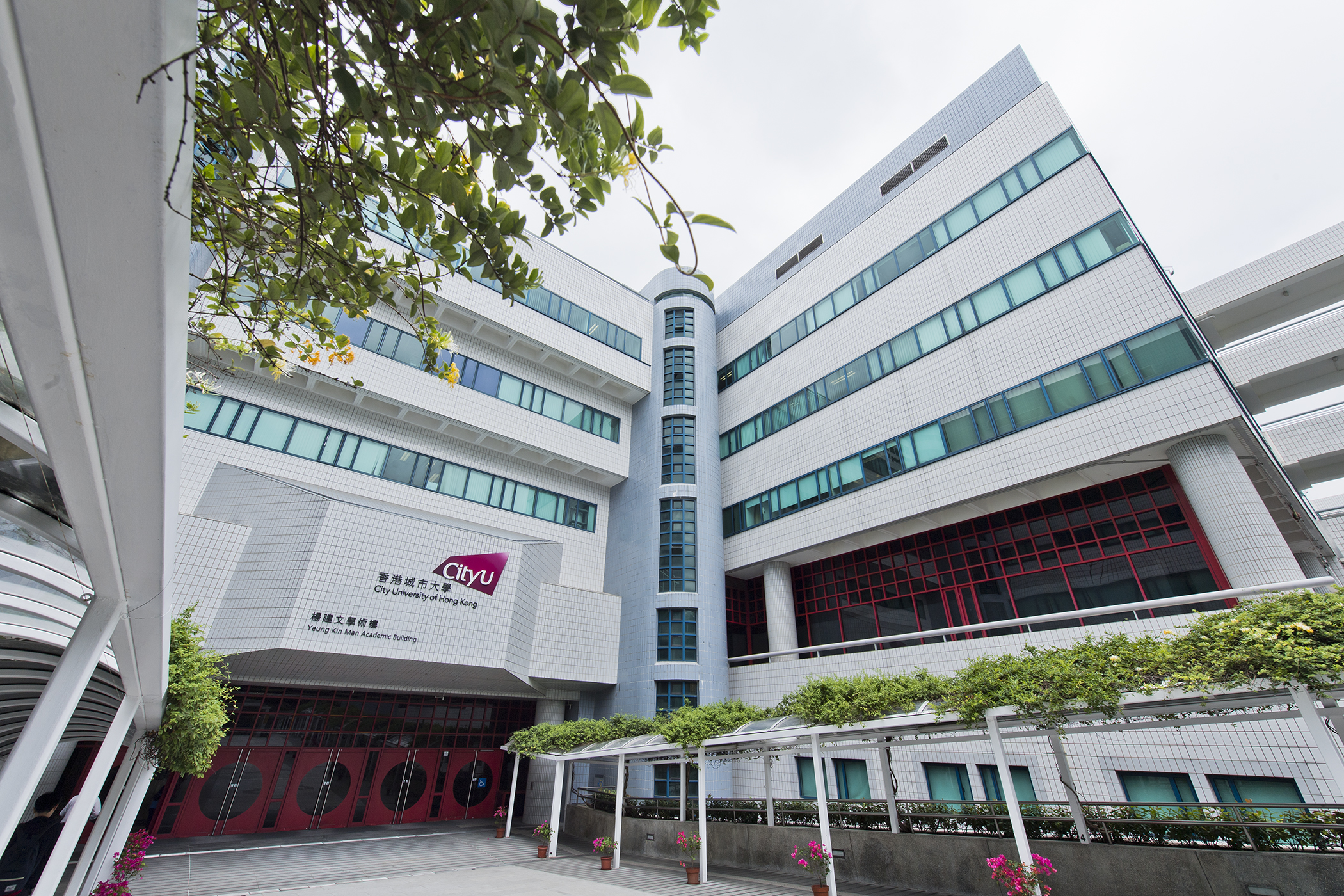
Entrance to YKM Academic Building

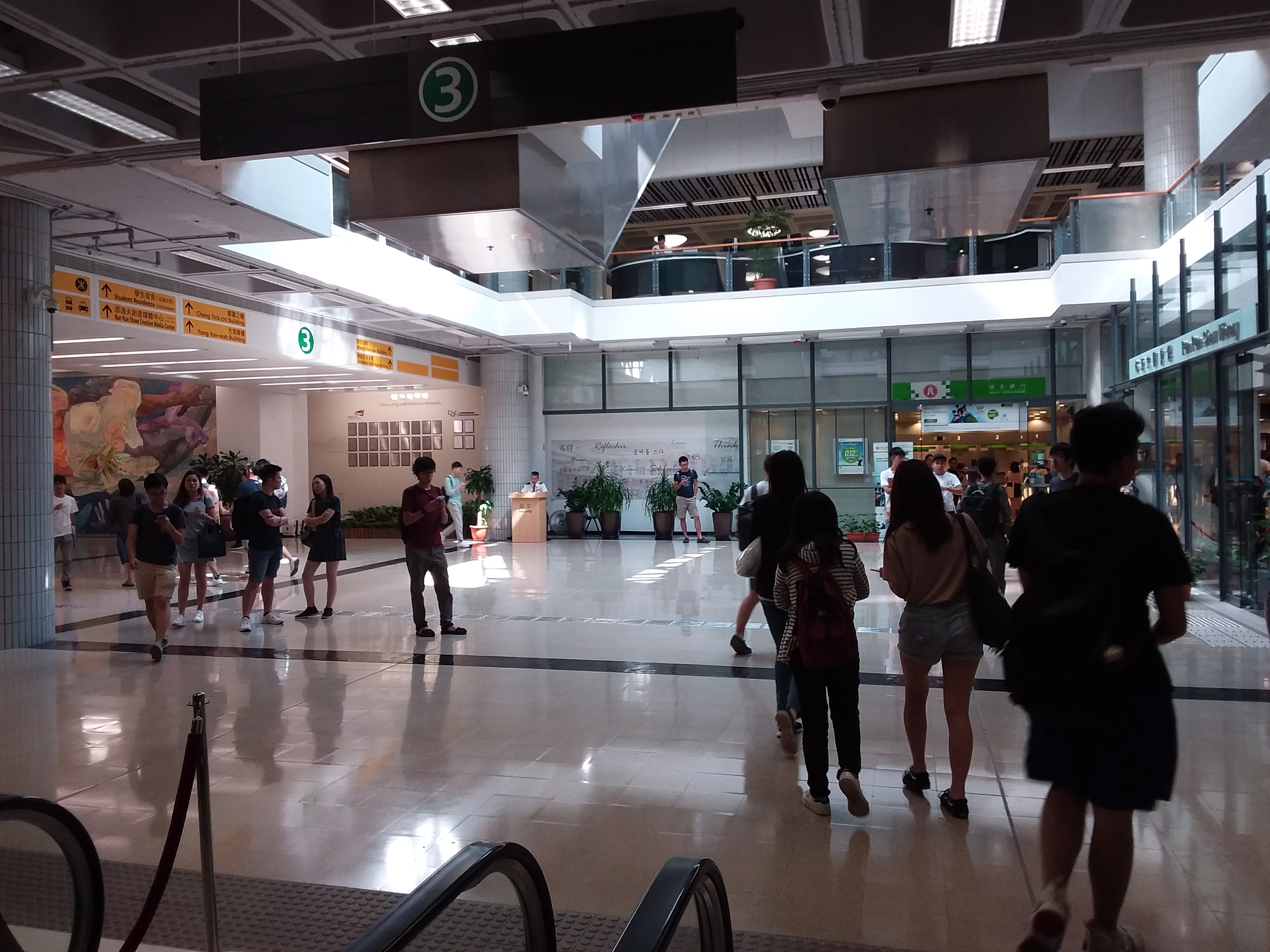
YKM Academic Building, 2019

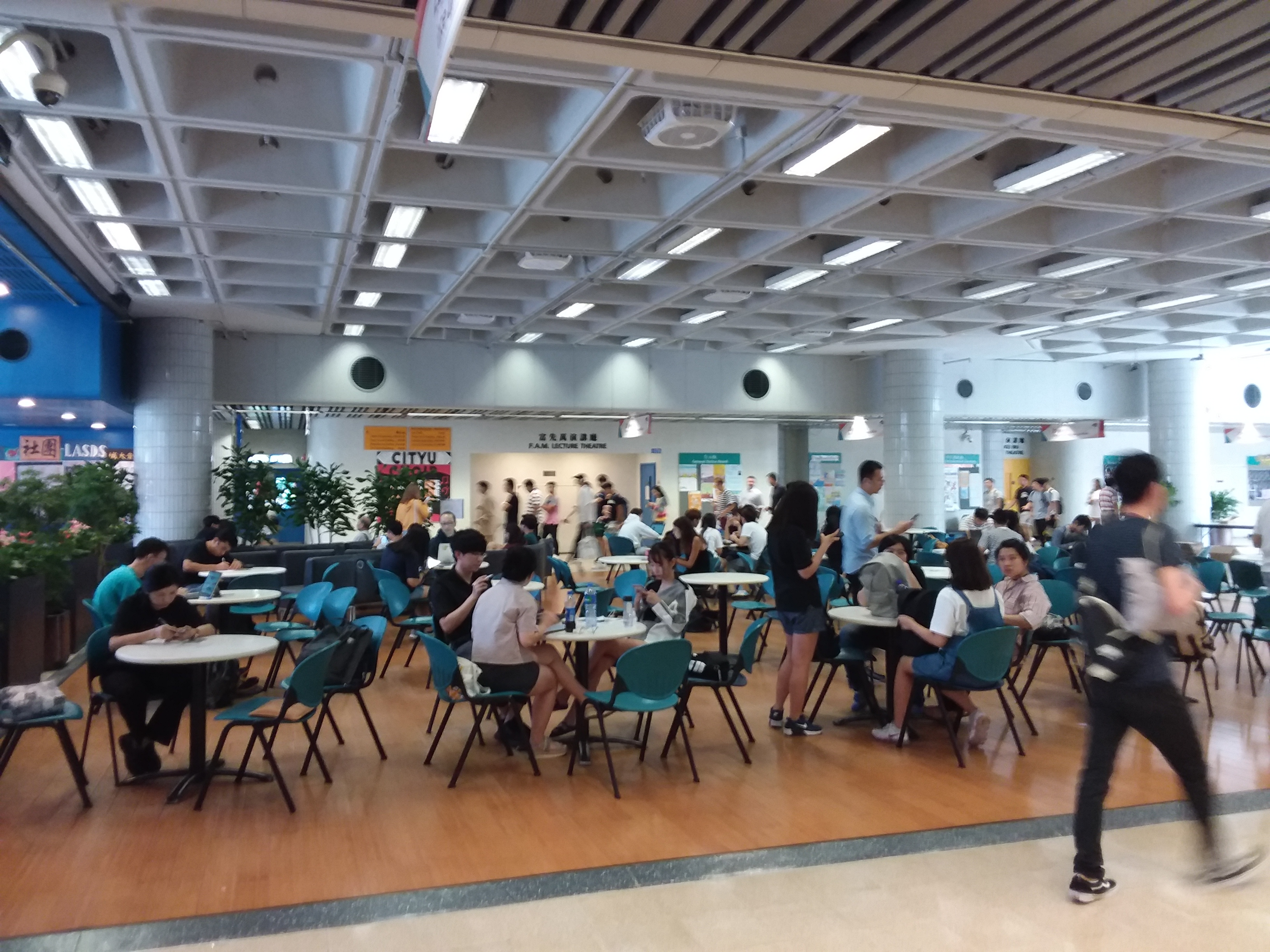
YKM Academic Building, 2019

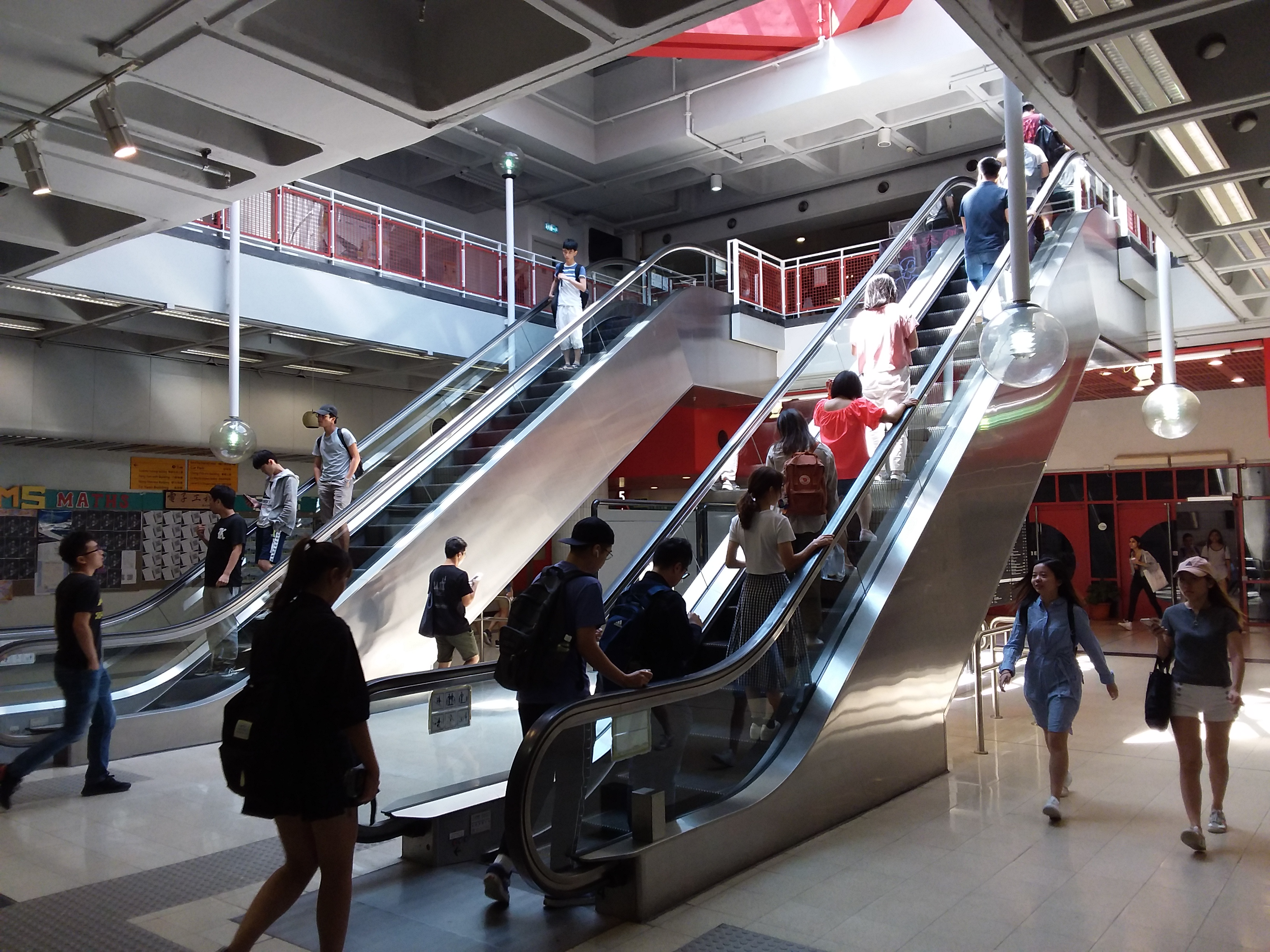
YKM Academic Building, 2019

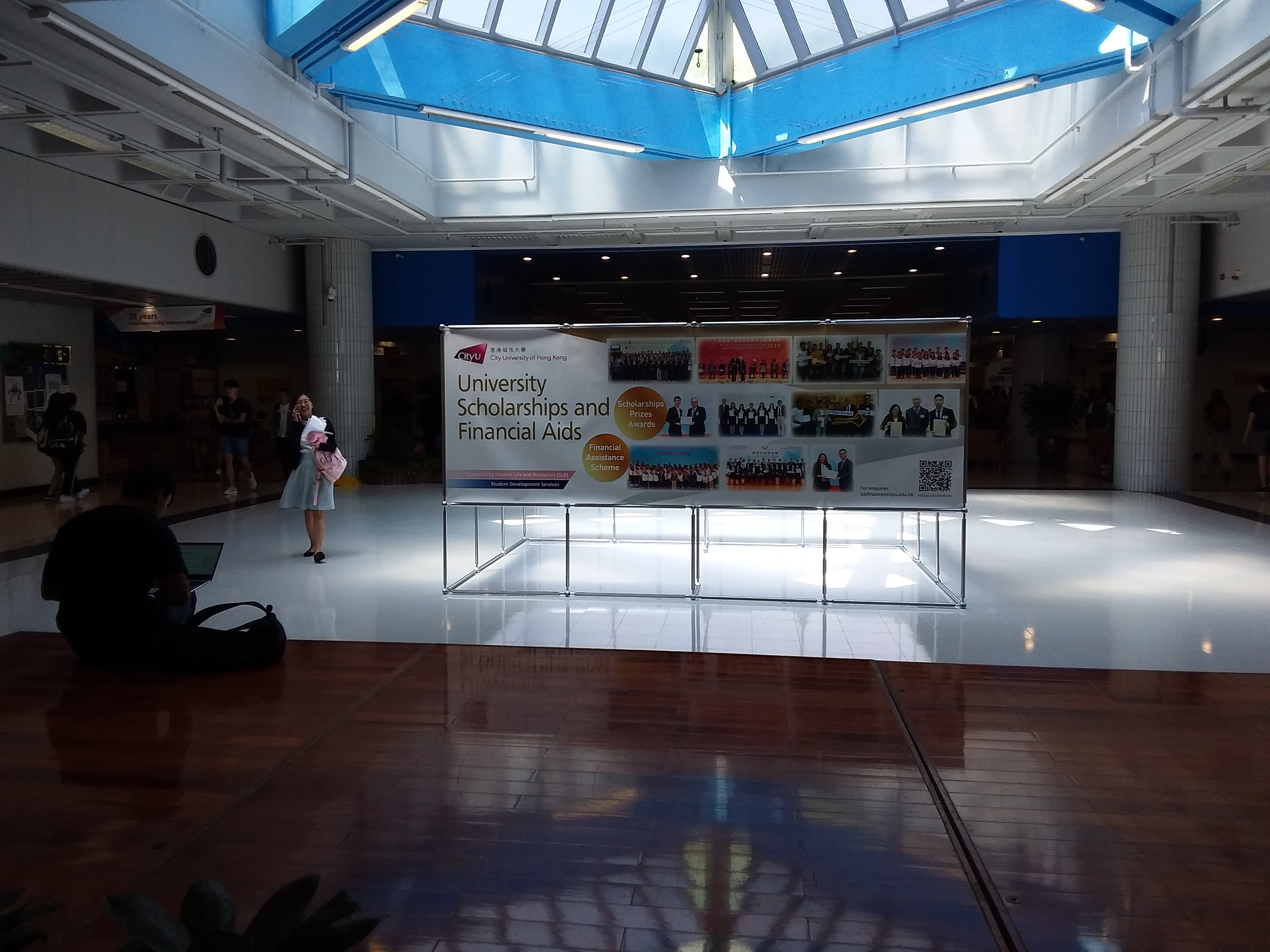
YKM Academic Building, 2019

=== Li Dak Sum Yip Yio Chin Academic Building (LI) ===
Li Dak Sum Yip Yio Chin Academic Building, previously called Academic 2, was designed by architecture firm Aedas. With a total area of 20,900 m^{2} (225,000 sq ft), it is located on the slope behind the sports complex on the campus, and is equipped with a resource centre, design room, computer room, language practice room, and student dining hall, classrooms, lecture halls, audio-visual rooms, multi-purpose activity rooms and sky gardens.

Li Dak Sum Yip Yio Chin Academic Building, CityU

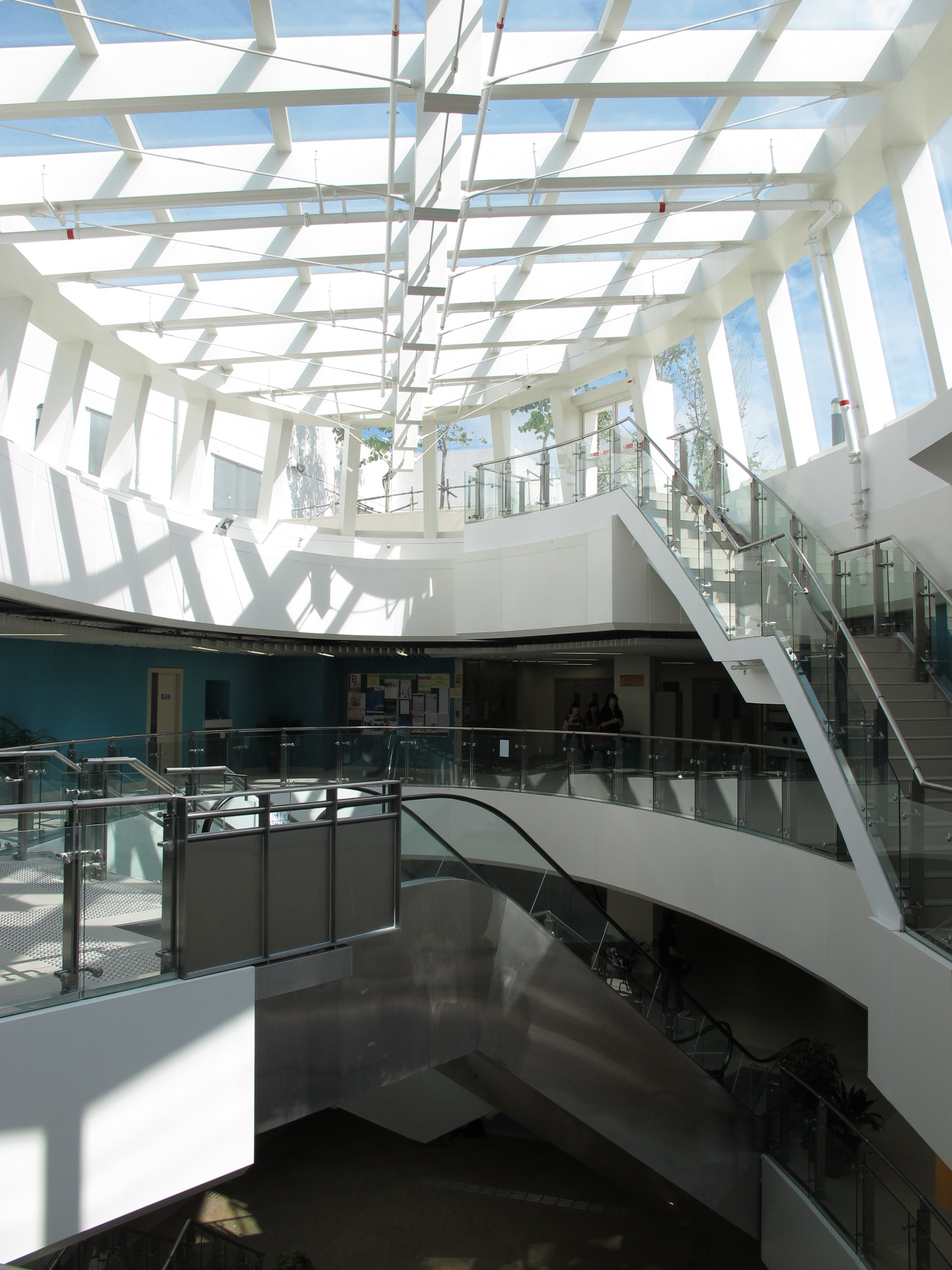
AC2 Void 1, 2011

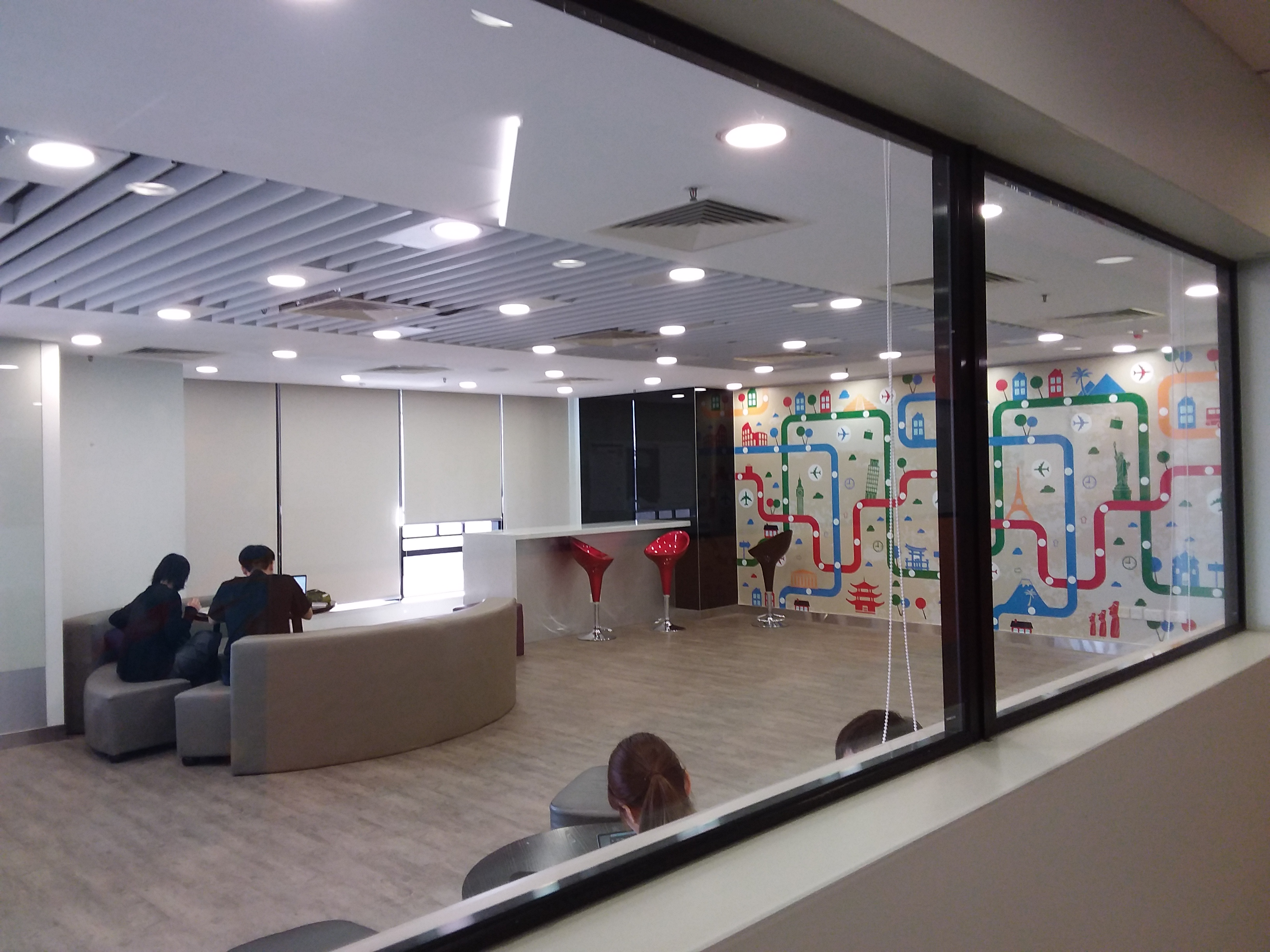
Multi-functional room, 2019

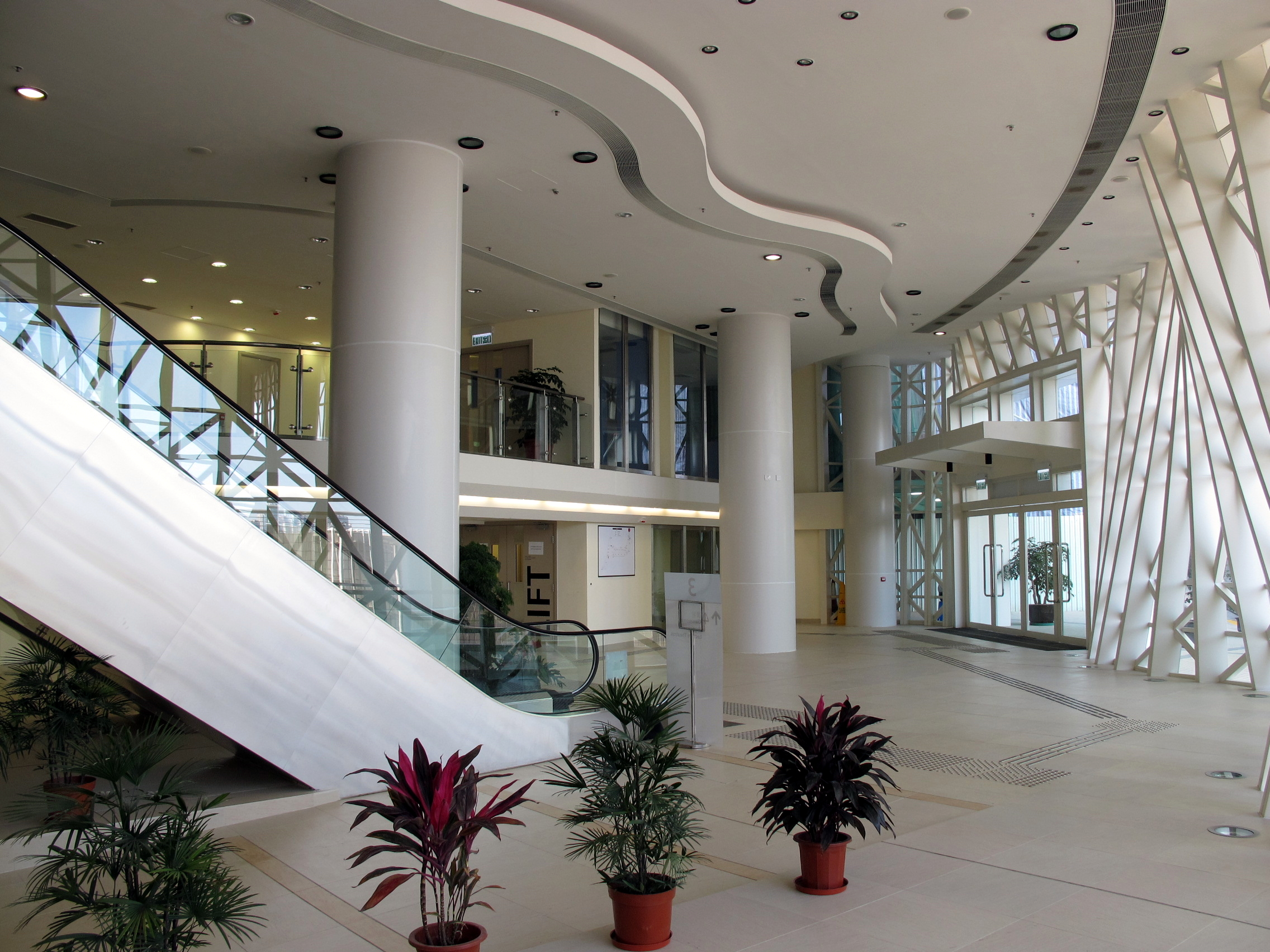
Main Entrance, AC2, 2011

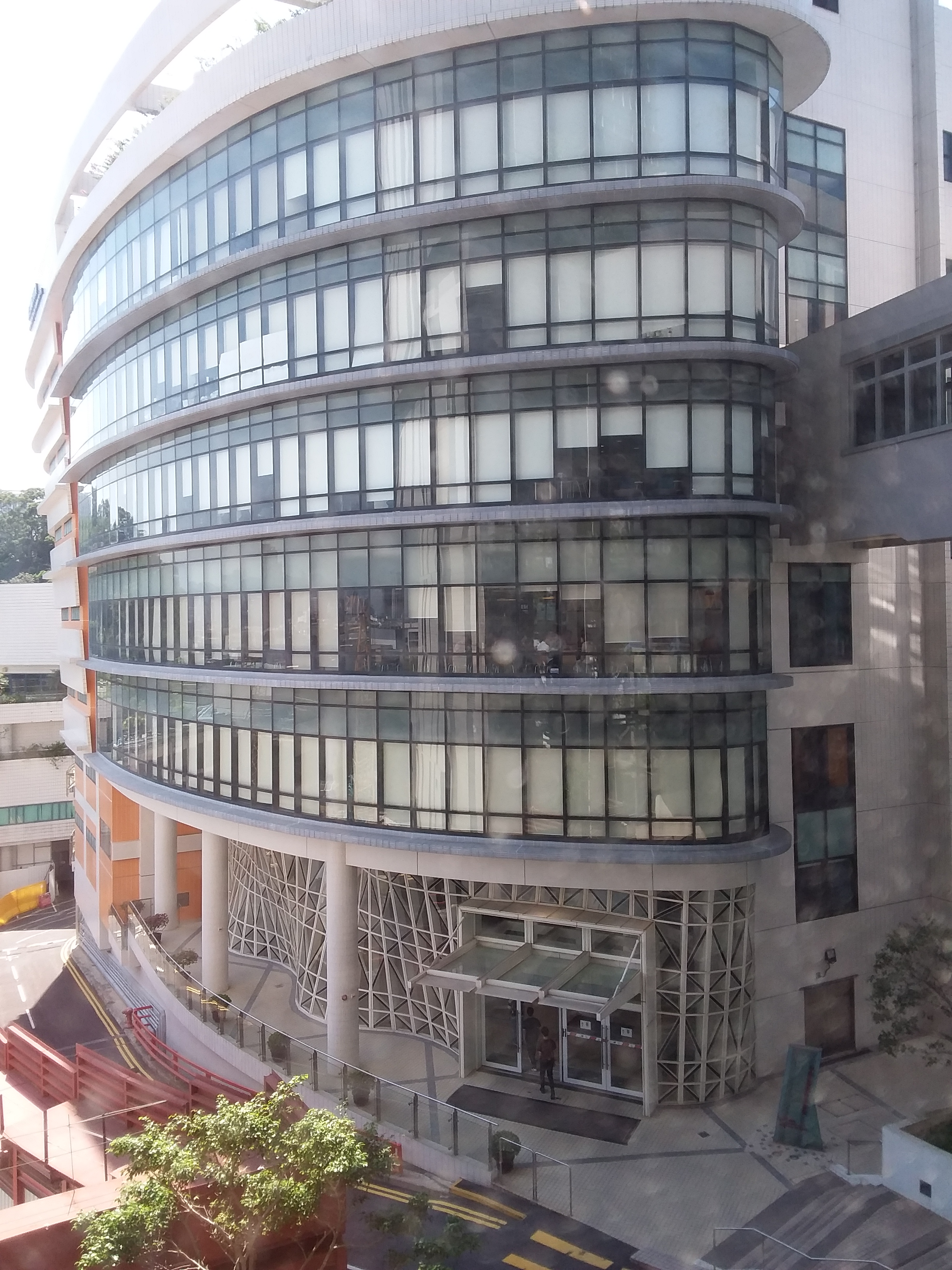
AC2, 2019

=== Lau Ming Wai Academic Building (LAU) ===
Lau Ming Wai Academic Building was called Academic 3. The academic building project is divided into two phases. The first phase is a 20-storey high-rise building, and the second phase is a five-storey low-rise building with a total usable area of 20,500 m^{2} (221,000 sq ft). It is the tallest building in CityU. Facilities include a 600-seat auditorium, classrooms, information technology laboratories, millimetre wave state key laboratories, restaurants, learning shared spaces, and administrative offices. The building was designed by the Hong Kong architectural firm Ronald Lu & Partners. The third and sixth floors are connected to the Li Dak Sum Yip Yio Chin Academic Building, while the fifth to seventh floors are connected to the student dormitory and Shaw Creative Media Centre. There are also terrace gardens on the 6th, 7th and 8th floors.

Lau Ming Wai Academic Building, CityU

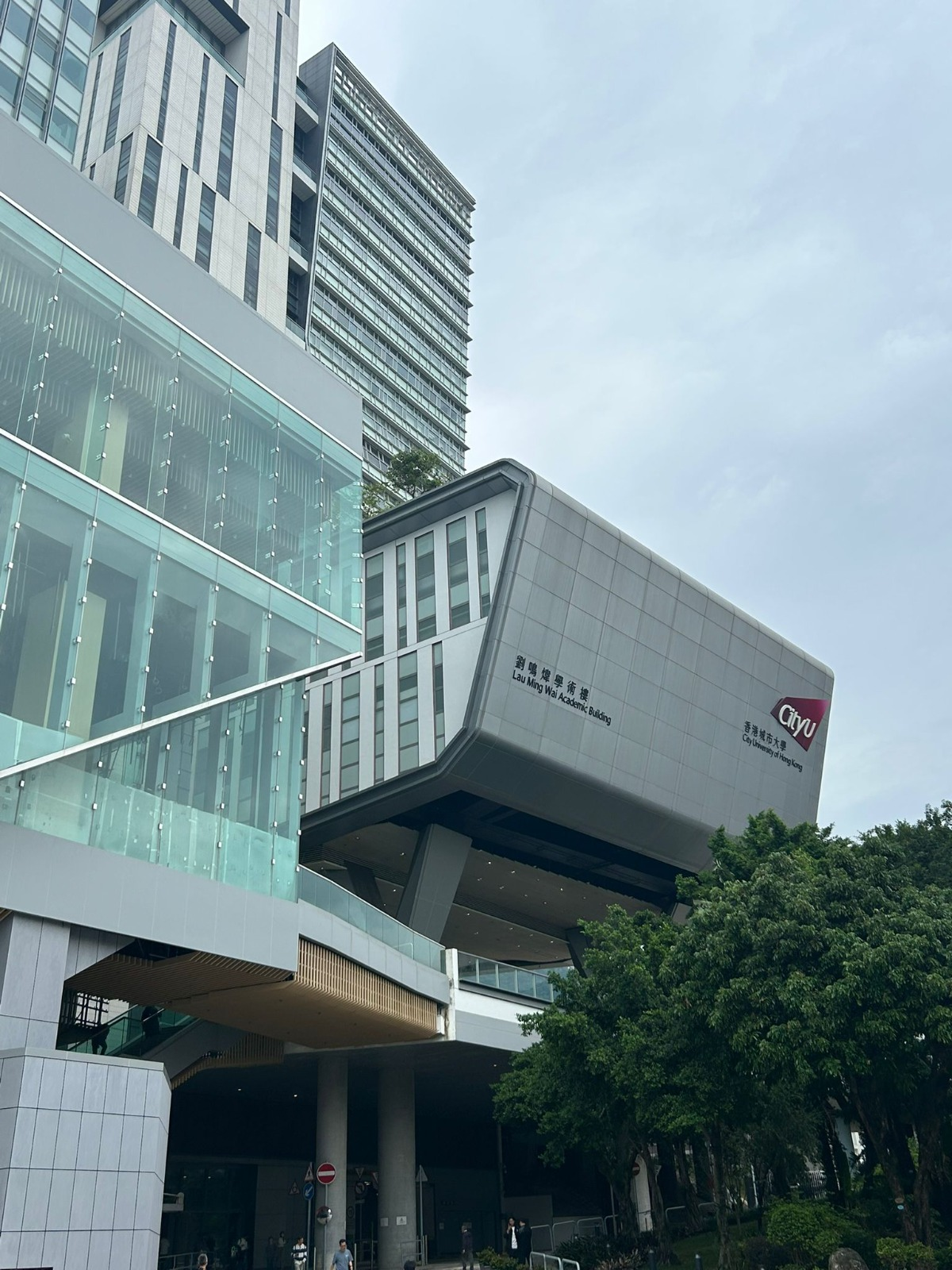

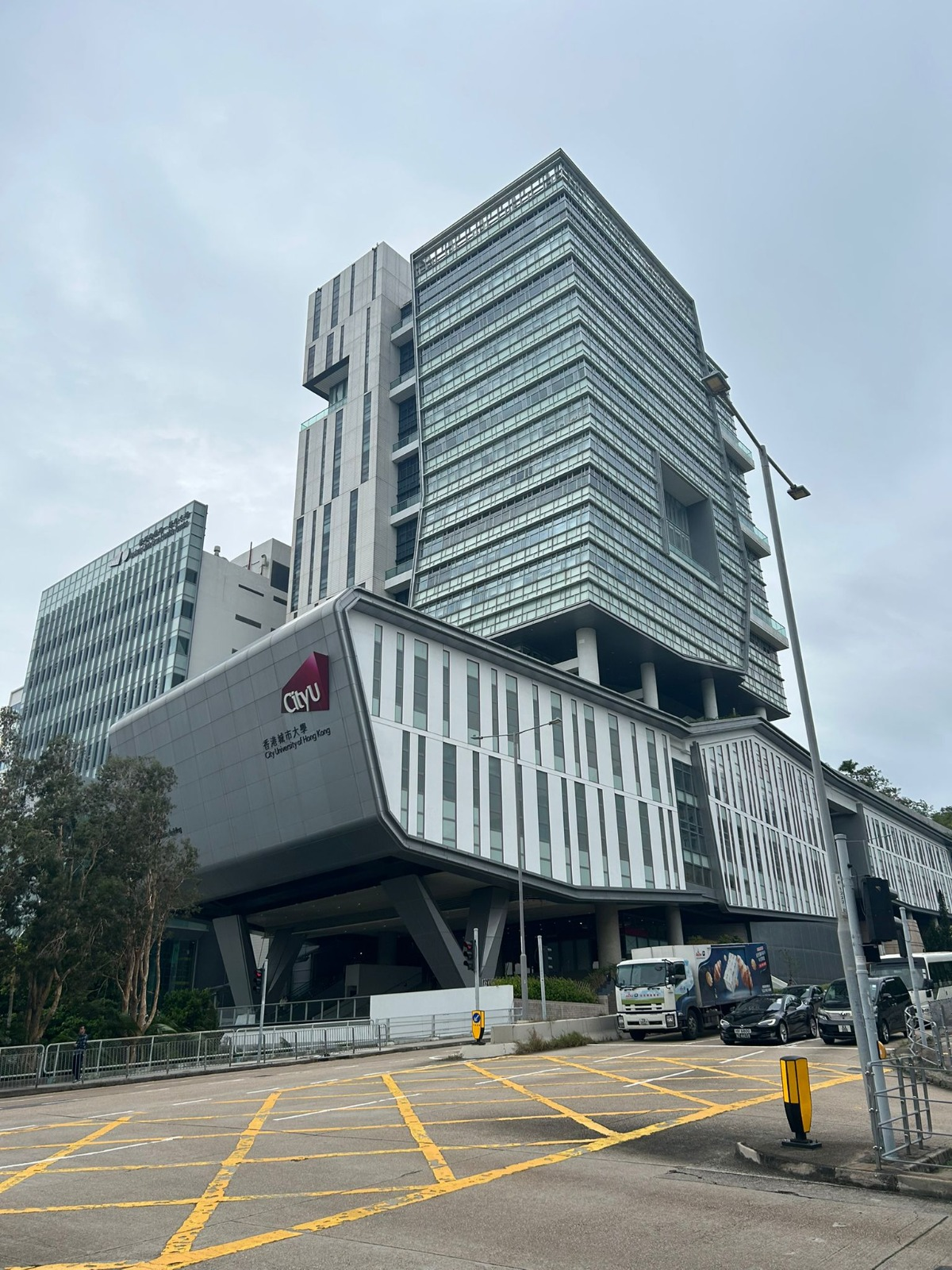

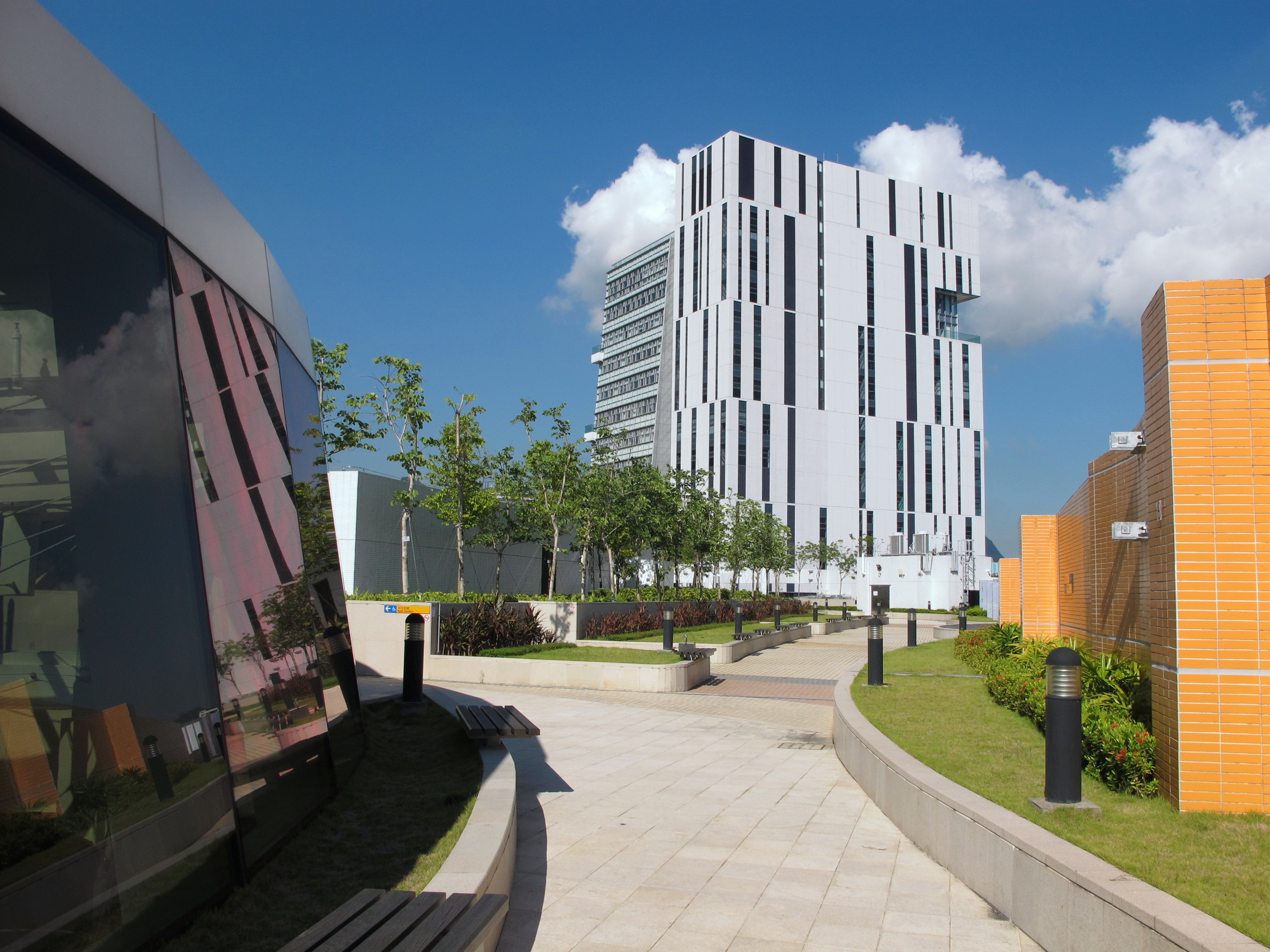

=== Run Run Shaw Creative Media Centre ===
Run Run Shaw Creative Media Centre was completed in 2011. It was designed by Daniel Libeskind cooperating with Leigh and Orange Ltd., and received several awards for its design. The building houses the university's School of Creative Media, the Centre for Applied Computing and Interactive Media and the computer science, media and communication, and English departments.

Run Run Shaw Creative Media Centre

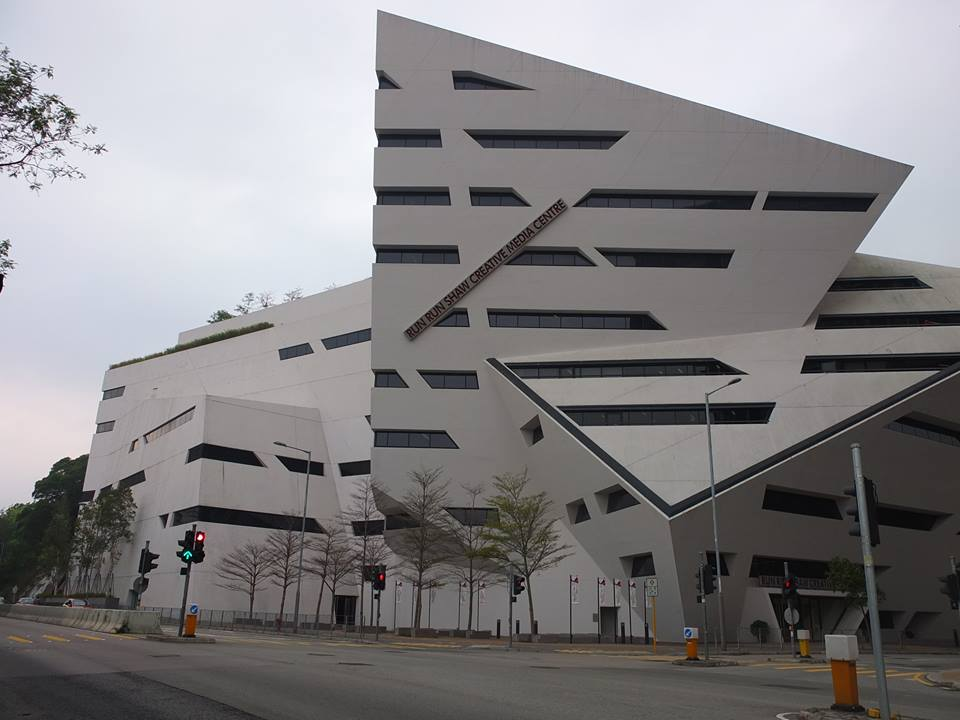
Run Run Shaw Creative Media Centre

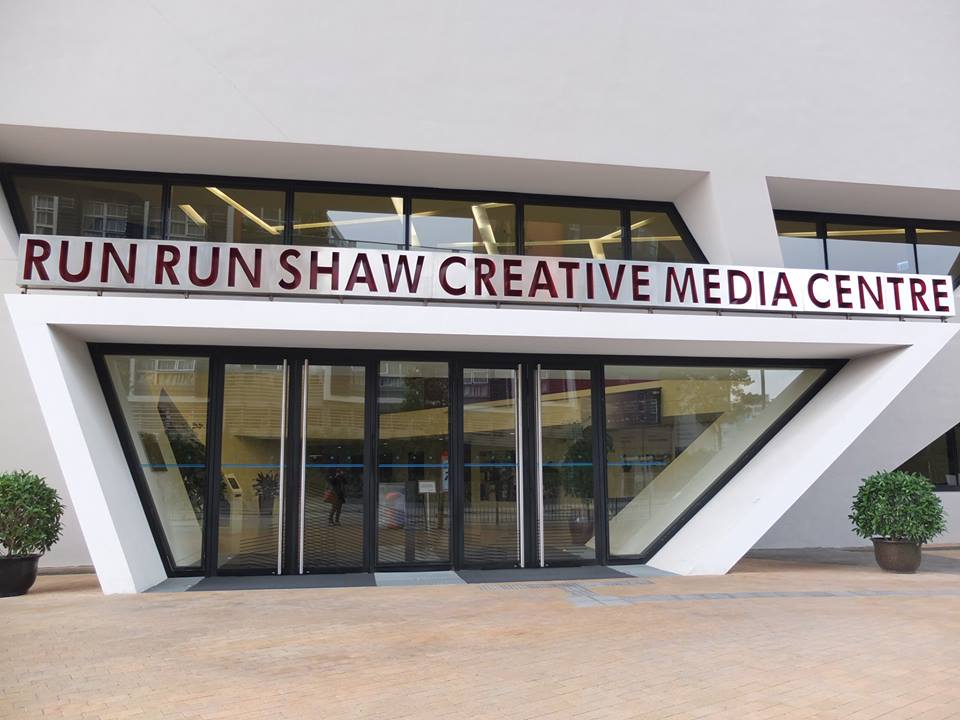
Entrance

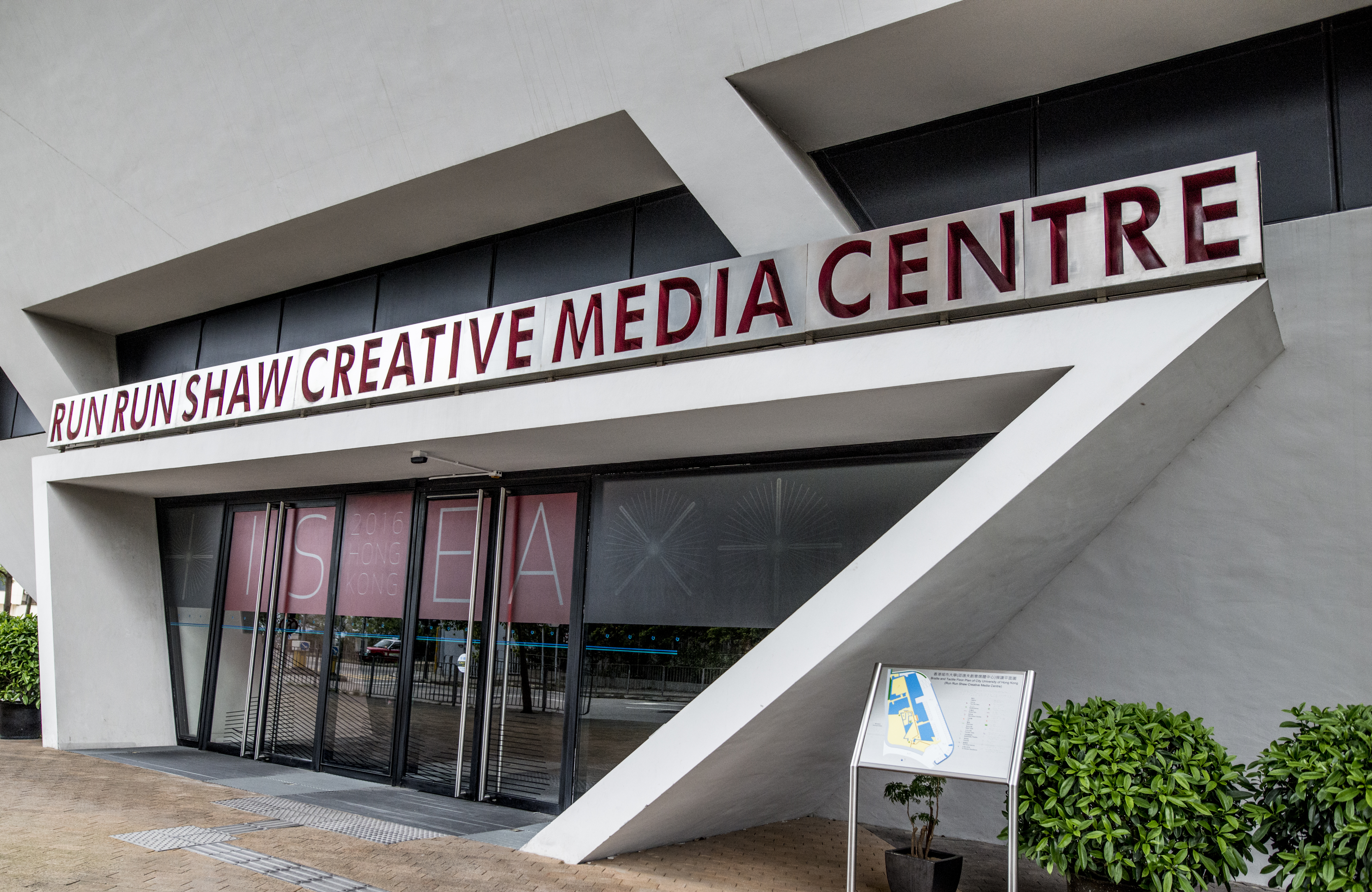
Entrance

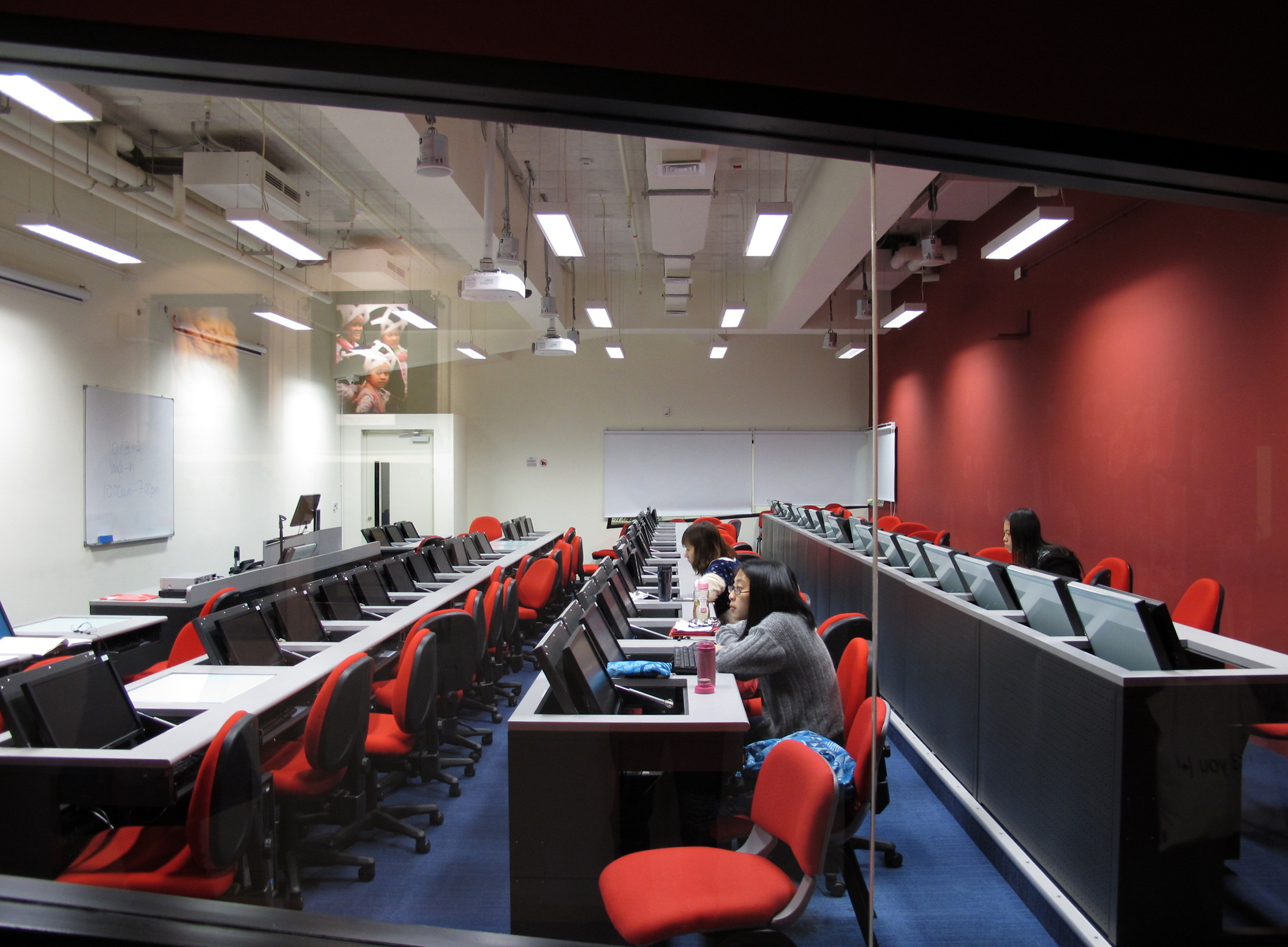
Level 5

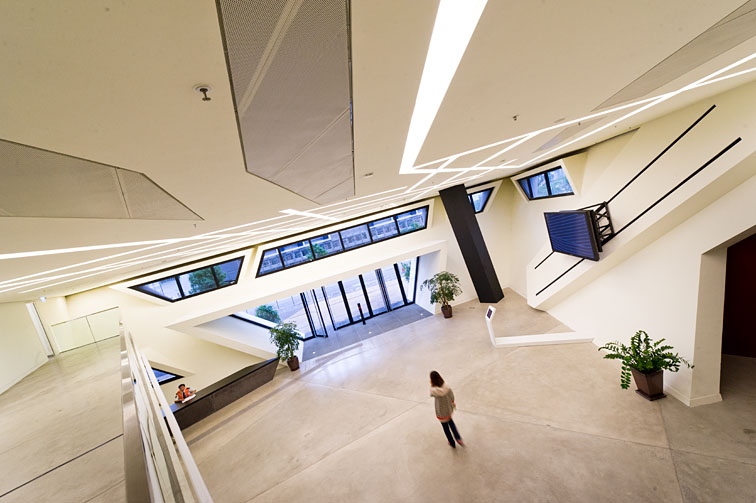

=== Jockey Club One Health Tower ===
Hu Fa Kuang Sports Centre was a five-storey sports centre which houses a multi-purpose hall and four practice gymnasiums for badminton, basketball, volleyball, martial arts and dance, and other activities. In May 2016, the sports hall roof collapsed due to the weight imposed by a new green roof placed on top.

Construction work commenced in November 2017 on the Jockey Club One Health Tower at the site of the former sports hall. The work is expected to be completed in 2025.

CityU International Centre

A ground-breaking ceremony was held for the CityU International Centre on 29 November 2021. The building was opened in 2025.

== Governance ==
Established in 1984 under Chapter 1132 of the Laws of Hong Kong (City University of Hong Kong Ordinance), CityU is one of the eight statutory universities in Hong Kong.

Like other statutory universities in Hong Kong, the chief Executive of Hong Kong acts as the chancellor of CityU. Prior to the Handover, this was a ceremonial title bestowed upon the governor of Hong Kong.

=== Council ===
The council is the supreme governing body of the university. The chief executive of Hong Kong has the power to appoint 15 of the 23 council members, seven of which are named directly and eight appointed upon recommendation of the council. The chief executive can also appoint the chairman, deputy and treasurer; the vice-chancellor is in turn appointed by the council.

=== Senate ===
The senate serves as the supreme academic body of the university and is responsible for deciding and reforming the university's academic policies. It is mainly composed of academic staff members but also includes the two representatives of the Students' Union and a representative of CityU Postgraduate Association.

== Academic organisation ==
The university's academic units are grouped under 11 colleges and schools, offering over 150 postgraduate and undergraduate programmes.

- College of Biomedicine
  - Department of Biomedical Engineering
  - Department of Biomedical Sciences
  - Department of Neuroscience
- College of Business
  - Department of Accountancy
  - Department of Economics and Finance
  - Department of Information Systems
  - Department of Management
  - Department of Marketing
  - Department of Decision Analytics and Operations
- College of Liberal Arts and Social Sciences
  - Department of Chinese and History
  - Department of Media and Communication
  - Department of English
  - Chan Feng Men-ling Chan Shuk-lin Language Centre
  - Department of Linguistics and Translation
  - Department of Public and International Affairs
  - Department of Social and Behavioural Sciences
- College of Engineering
  - Department of Systems Engineering
  - Department of Architecture and Civil Engineering
  - Department of Electrical Engineering
  - Department of Mechanical Engineering
  - Department of Materials Science and Engineering
- College of Science
  - Department of Chemistry
  - Department of Mathematics
  - Department of Physics
- Jockey Club College of Veterinary Medicine and Life Sciences
  - Department of Infectious Diseases and Public Health
  - Department of Veterinary Clinical Sciences
- College of Computing
  - Department of Computer Science
  - Department of Data Science
  - Department of Biostatistics
- School of Creative Media
- School of Energy and Environment
- School of Law
- Chow Yei Ching School of Graduate Studies

== Rankings and reputation ==
University rankings

Global – Overall
- ARWU World: 95 (2026)
- QS World: 52 (2027)
- QS Under 50: 4 (2021)
- THE World: 73 (2026)
- THE Reputation: 151-200 (2025)
- THE Young Universities: 4 (2024)
- USNWR Global: 47 (2026)

Regional – Overall
- QS Asia: 4 (2027)
- THE Asia: 14 (2026)
- USNWR Asia: 9 (2026)

=== Overall Ranking ===
CityUHK was ranked #52 worldwide in the QS World University Rankings 2027, #73 worldwide in the Times Higher Education World University Rankings 2026, #47 worldwide in the USNEWS Global Rankings 2026, and #95 worldwide in ARWU 2026.

CityUHK was #68 worldwide in terms of aggregate performance across THE, QS, and ARWU, as reported by ARTU 2024.

It was previously ranked 49th and 48th worldwide in QSWUR 2018 and 2021, respectively.

CityUHK is ranked as the most international university in the world in 2024 and 2025 by Times Higher Education.

=== Young University Ranking ===
CityUHK is #4 worldwide in the QS "Top 50 Under 50" 2021 and #4 worldwide in THE Young Universities Rankings 2024.

=== Research Recognition and Achievement ===
In 2025, about 256 CityUHK scholars were included in the Stanford University's "World's Top 2% Scientists" list. Among these, two professors were ranked within the global top 1,000, representing two of the five scholars from Hong Kong universities to achieve this ranking.

=== Graduate Employability Ranking ===
CityUHK graduates were ranked 89th worldwide in the QS Graduate Employability Rankings 2022.

== Student life ==
=== Student residence ===
Student residences are located on Cornwall Street, near Lau Ming Wai academic building. They provide housing and recreational space for undergraduates and postgraduates. Among them, halls 1 to 9 were designed by the British firm RMJM, while halls 10 and 11 were designed by P&T Group. Most halls are named after donors:

- Undergraduates: Jockey Club Humanity Hall (Hall 1), HSBC Prosperity Hall (Hall 2), Alumni Civility Hall (Hall 3), Jockey Club Academy Hall (Hall 4), Chan Sui Kau Hall (Hall 5), Lee Shau Kee Hall (Hall 6), Jockey Club Harmony Hall (Hall 7), Sir Gordon and Lady Ivy Wu Hall (Hall 9), Hall 10, Hall 11
- Research postgraduates: Yip Yuen Yuk Hing Hall (Hall 8), Jockey Club House

Construction work for the 5th phase of the Student Hostel project at Whitehead, Ma On Shan commenced in March 2022. The student residence was officially completed in August 2024, consisting of 6 halls in 3 towers for 2,200 CityU undergraduates and postgraduates.

- Hall 12, Hall 13, Hall 14, Hall 15, Hall 16 and Hall 17

The university also provides off-campus accommodation and short term accommodation for non-local students.

=== Student clubs ===
Student clubs in CityU are diverse. There are more than 80 clubs from interest groups, residents’ associations and departmental Societies, along with cultural groups including orchestra, choir and debate teams.

=== Sport teams ===
Sport teams are mentored by Student Development Services. In April 2017, they have extended their dominance in sports competitions by winning a record-breaking ninth Grand Slam in the 2016-2017 annual sports competitions.

There are 18 sports teams in total. The university has over 400 athletes in 16 sports events.

- Athletics
- Badminton
- Basketball
- Cross country
- Dragon boat
- Fencing
- Handball
- Karatedo
- Rugby
- Soccer
- Squash
- Swimming
- Table tennis
- Taekwondo
- Tennis
- Volleyball
- Woodball
- Water polo

== Publications ==
=== City University of Hong Kong Press ===
The City University of Hong Kong Press was founded in 1996 as the publishing arm of the university. It mainly publishes three types of publications: academic works, professional books, and books of general interest and social concern. The press focuses on China studies, Hong Kong studies, Asian studies, politics and public policy.

=== University publication ===
Title	Type	Audience	Publisher	Frequency
CityUpdate	Online magazine	Public	Communications & Public Relations Office	Monthly
CityUtoday	Magazine	Public	Communications & Public Relations Office	Quarterly
City AlumNet	Magazine	Alumni	Communications & Public Relations Office	Annually
CityUpbeats	Magazine	Students	Student Development Services	Quarterly
DiverCity	Blog	International students	Global Engagement Office	Random

== Notable alumni ==
- Rimsky Yuen - Former Secretary for Justice of Hong Kong, Barrister
- Christine Loh – Former Undersecretary for the Environment
- Christopher Cheung – CEO of Christfund Securities and former Legislative Councillor
- David Chung Wai-keung – former Undersecretary for Innovation and Technology Bureau
- Kam Nai-Wai – Legislative Councillor
- Eunice Yung Hoi-Yan - Hong Kong Barrister and former member of the Legislative Council of Hong Kong
- Bona Mugabe – Business woman, daughter of former president of Zimbabwe and ZANU-PF leader, Robert Mugabe
- Paul Tse – former Legislative Councillor
- Lau Kong-Wah – Secretary for Home Affairs, former undersecretary of the Constitutional and Mainland Affairs Bureau, former legislative councillor
- Matthew Wong – critically acclaimed painter
- Jozev Kiu – noted wuxia fiction writer and lyricist
- Fiona Sit – singer and actress
- Anson Lo – singer and actor; member of Hong Kong Cantopop group MIRROR
- Alton Wong – singer and actor; member of Hong Kong Cantopop group MIRROR
- Ian Chan – singer and actor; member of Hong Kong Cantopop group MIRROR
- Stanley Yau – singer and actor; member of Hong Kong Cantopop group MIRROR
- Keith Lam – new media artist who co-founded Dimension Plus and founded openground.
- Ivy Ma - Visual artist
Notable Alumni of CityU

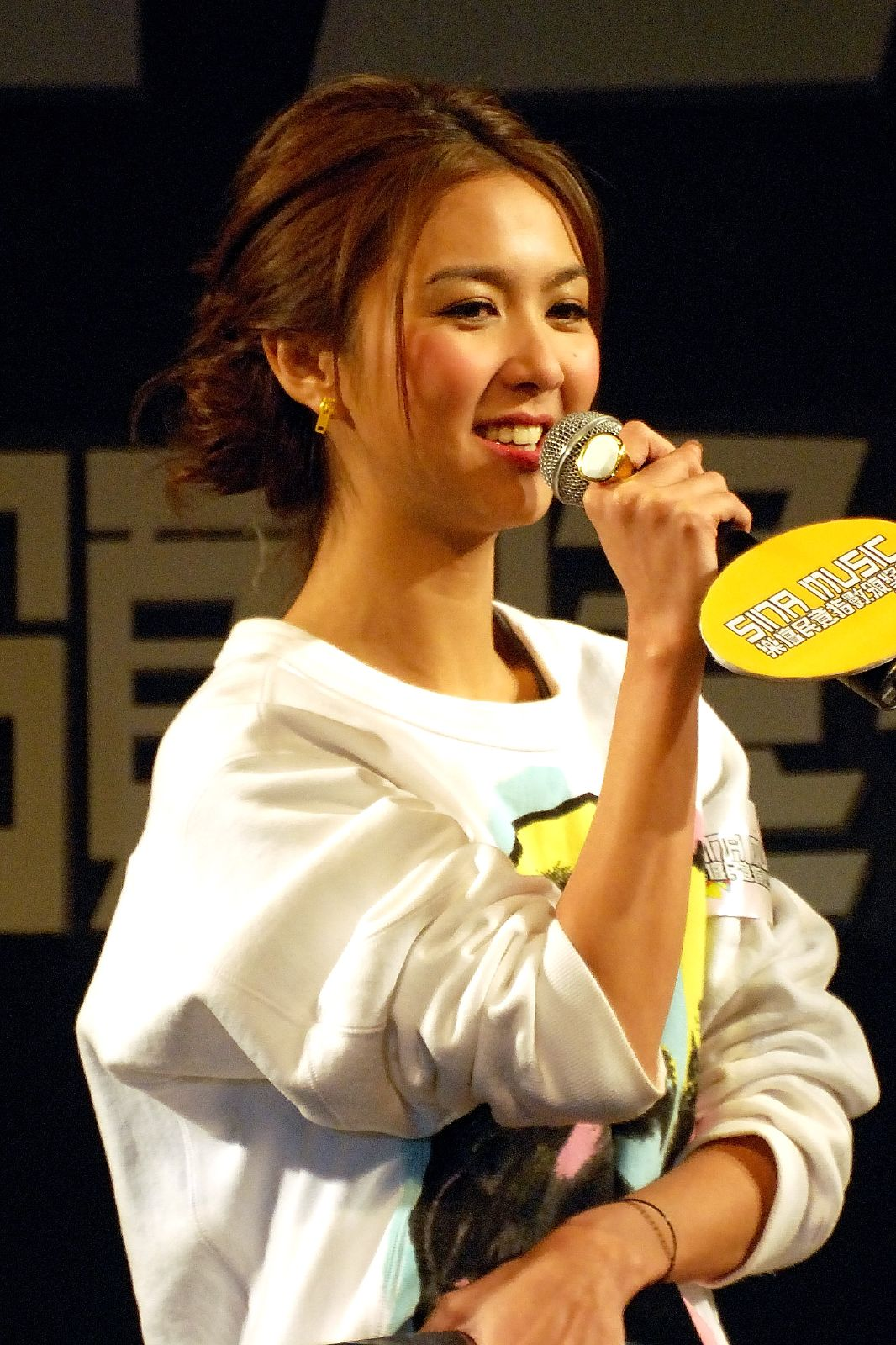
Fiona Sit, singer

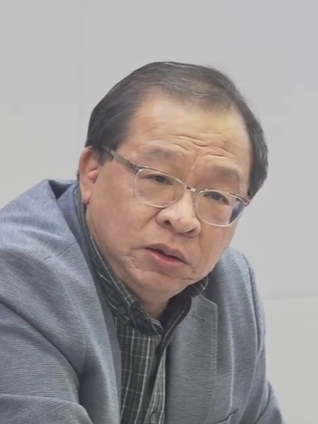
Kam Nai-wai

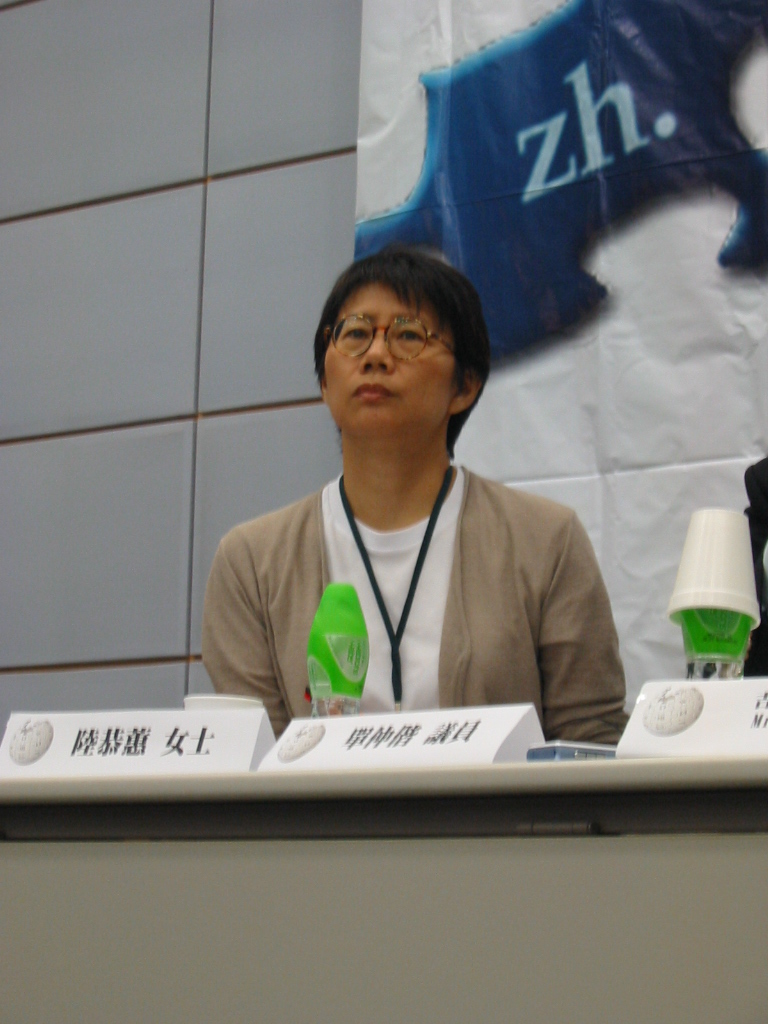
Christine Loh

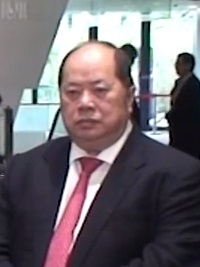
Christopher Cheung

== Gallery ==
Buildings of/near CityU

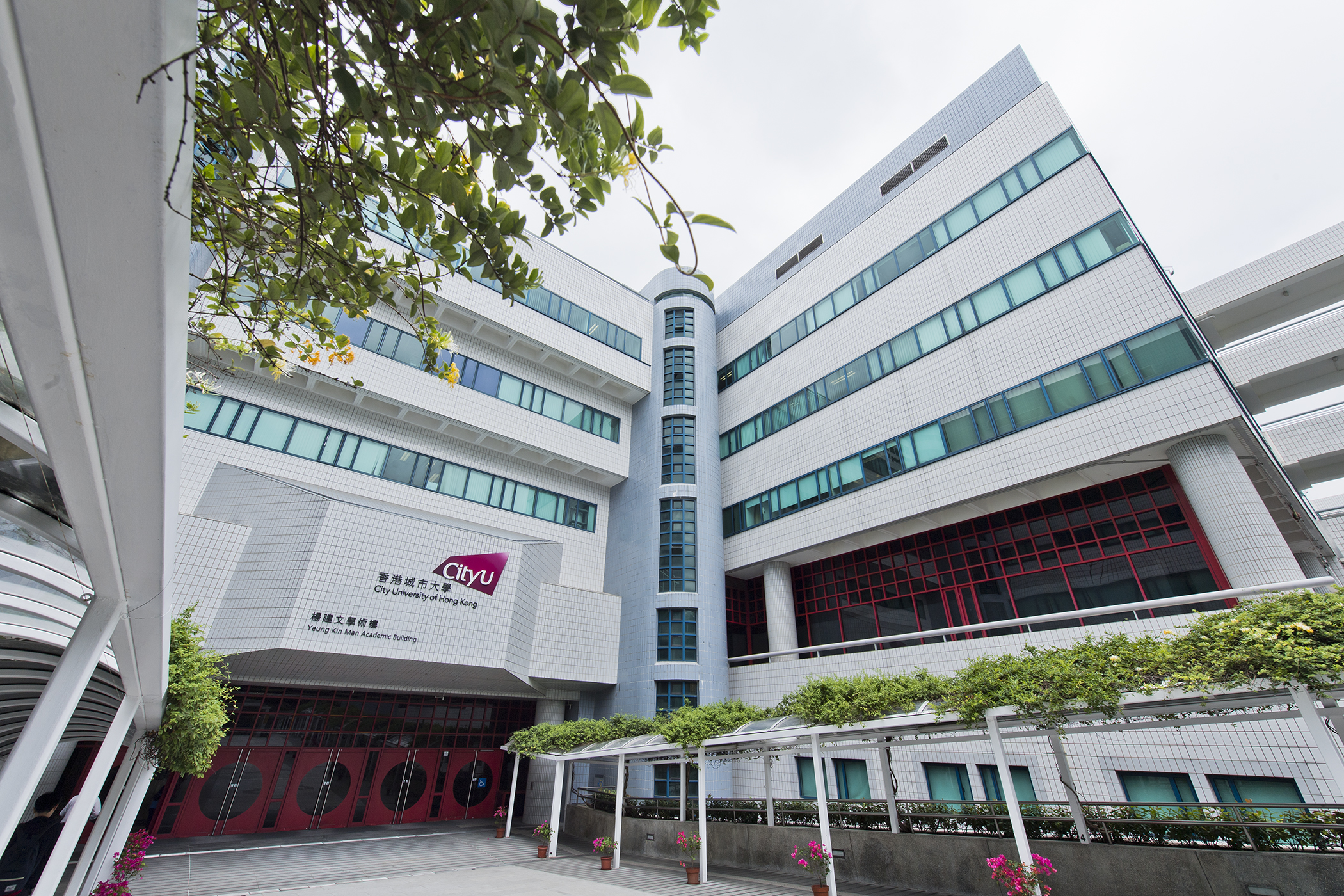
Main Entrance

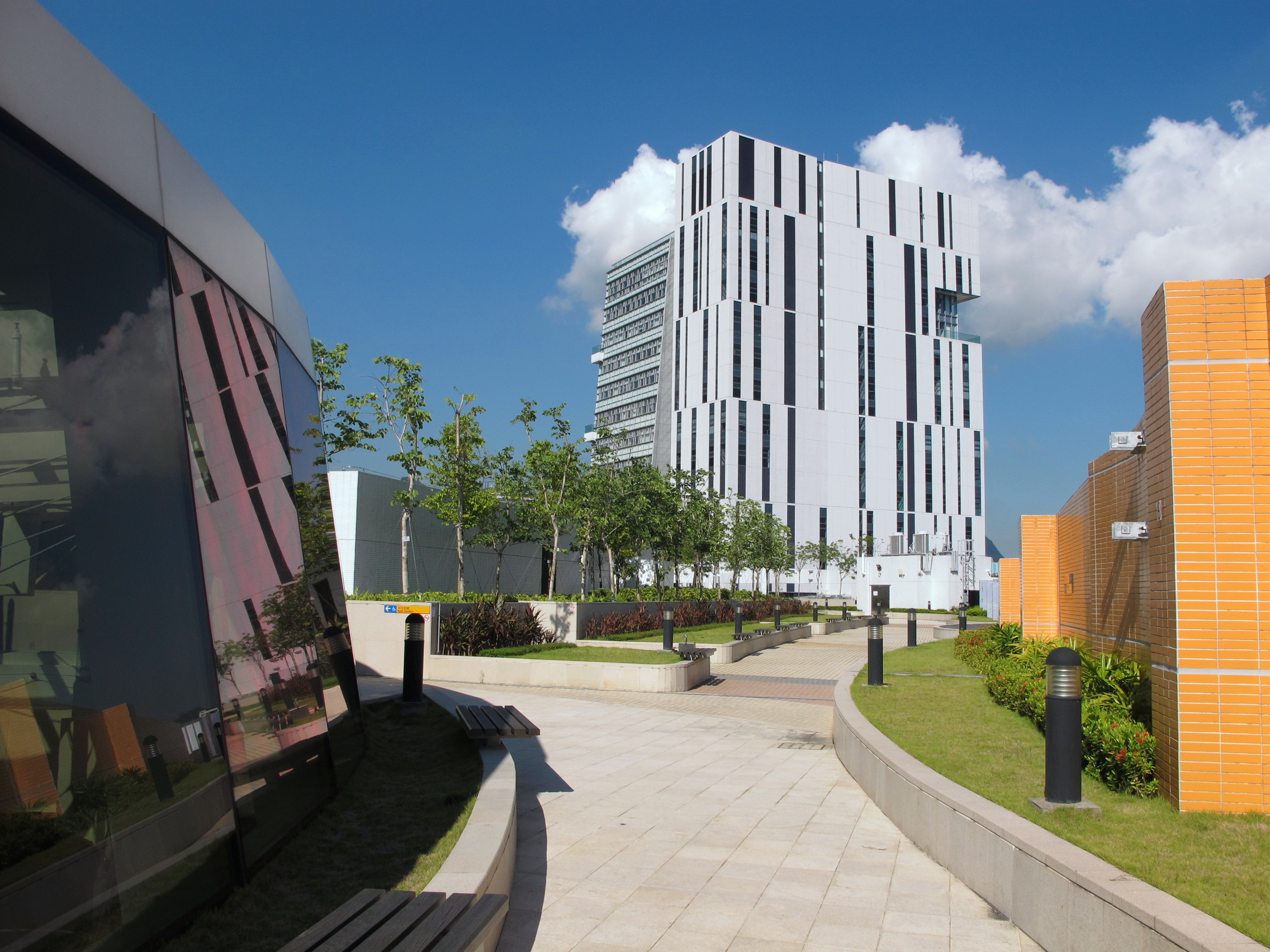
AC2 Roof Garden 2013

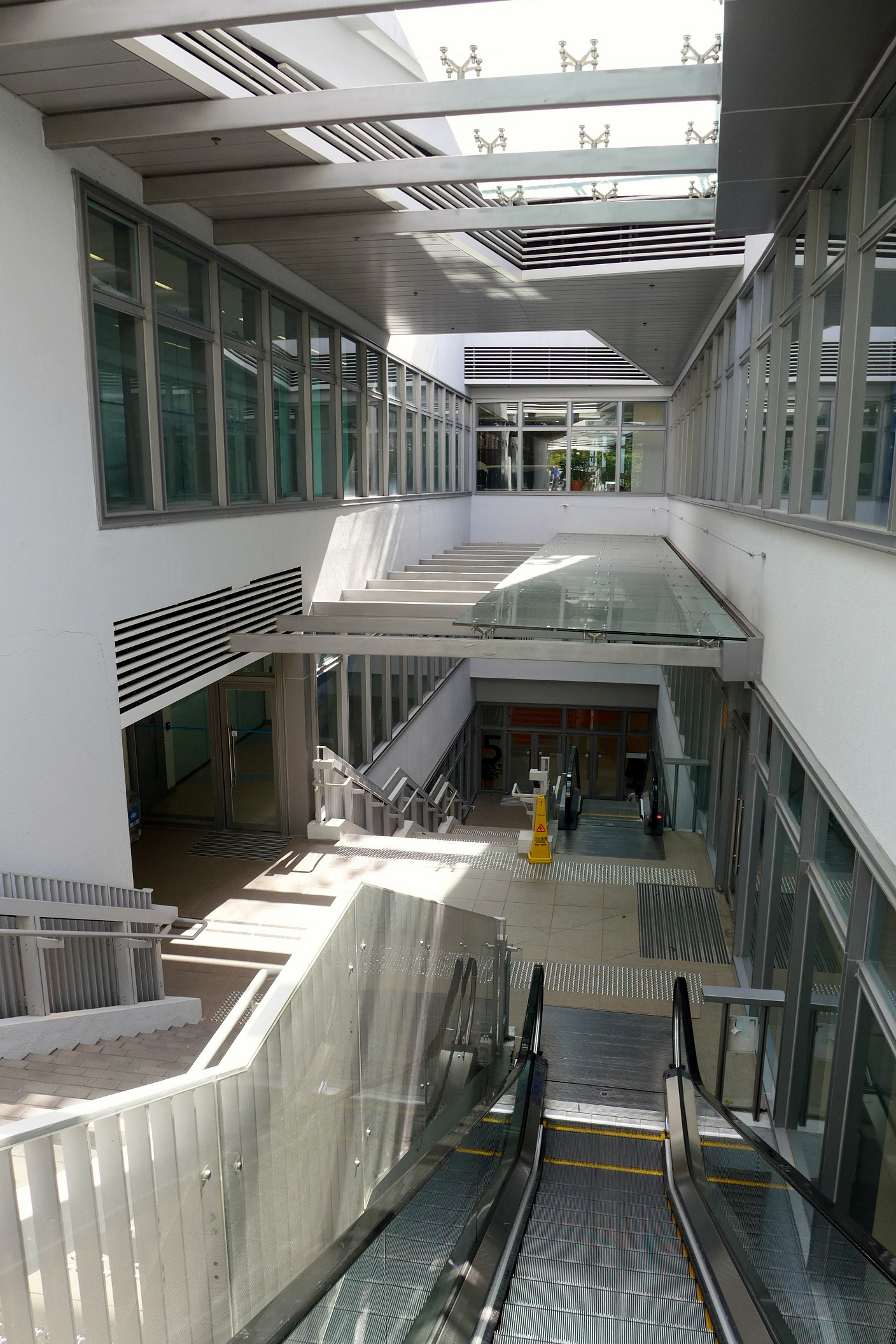
AC3

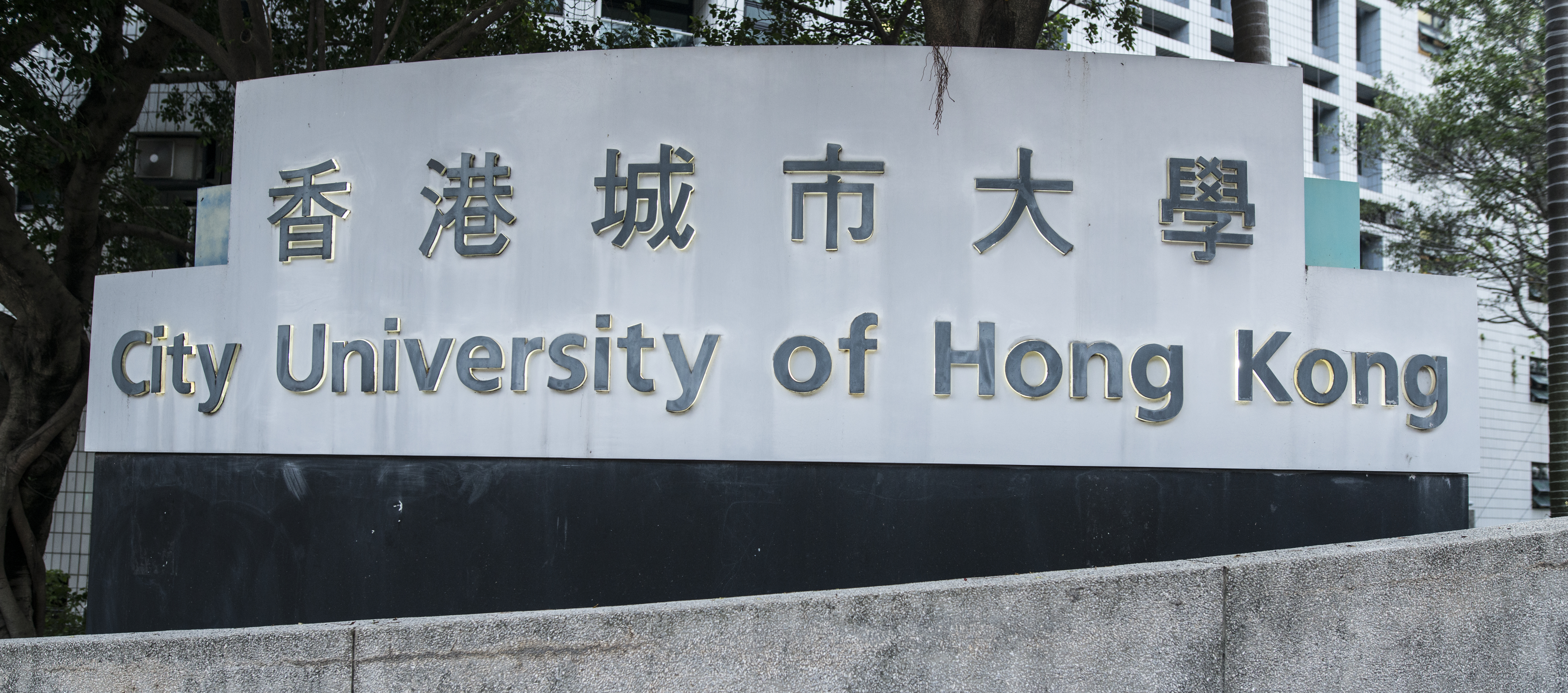
University Sign

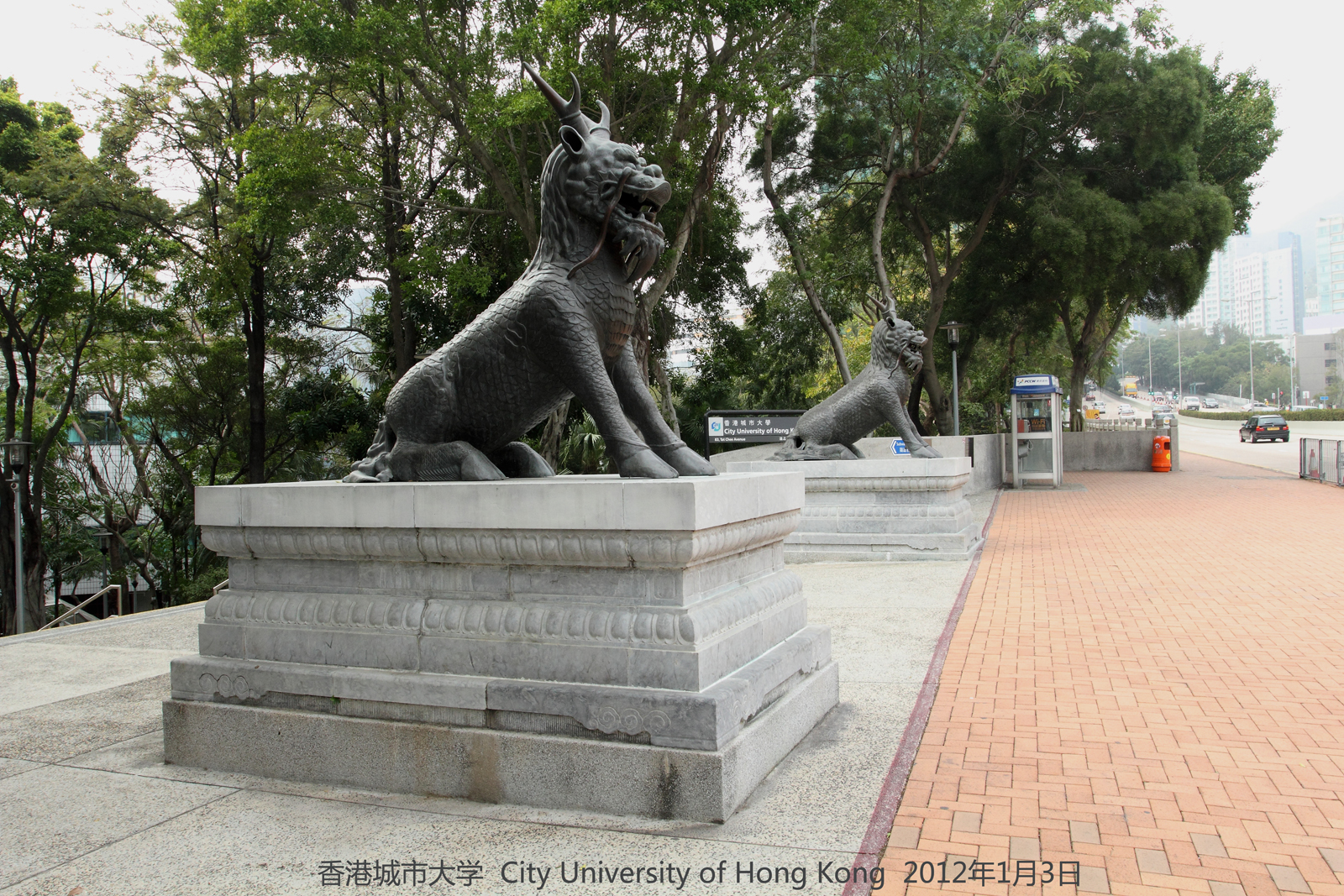
Kirin sculptures near the main entrance

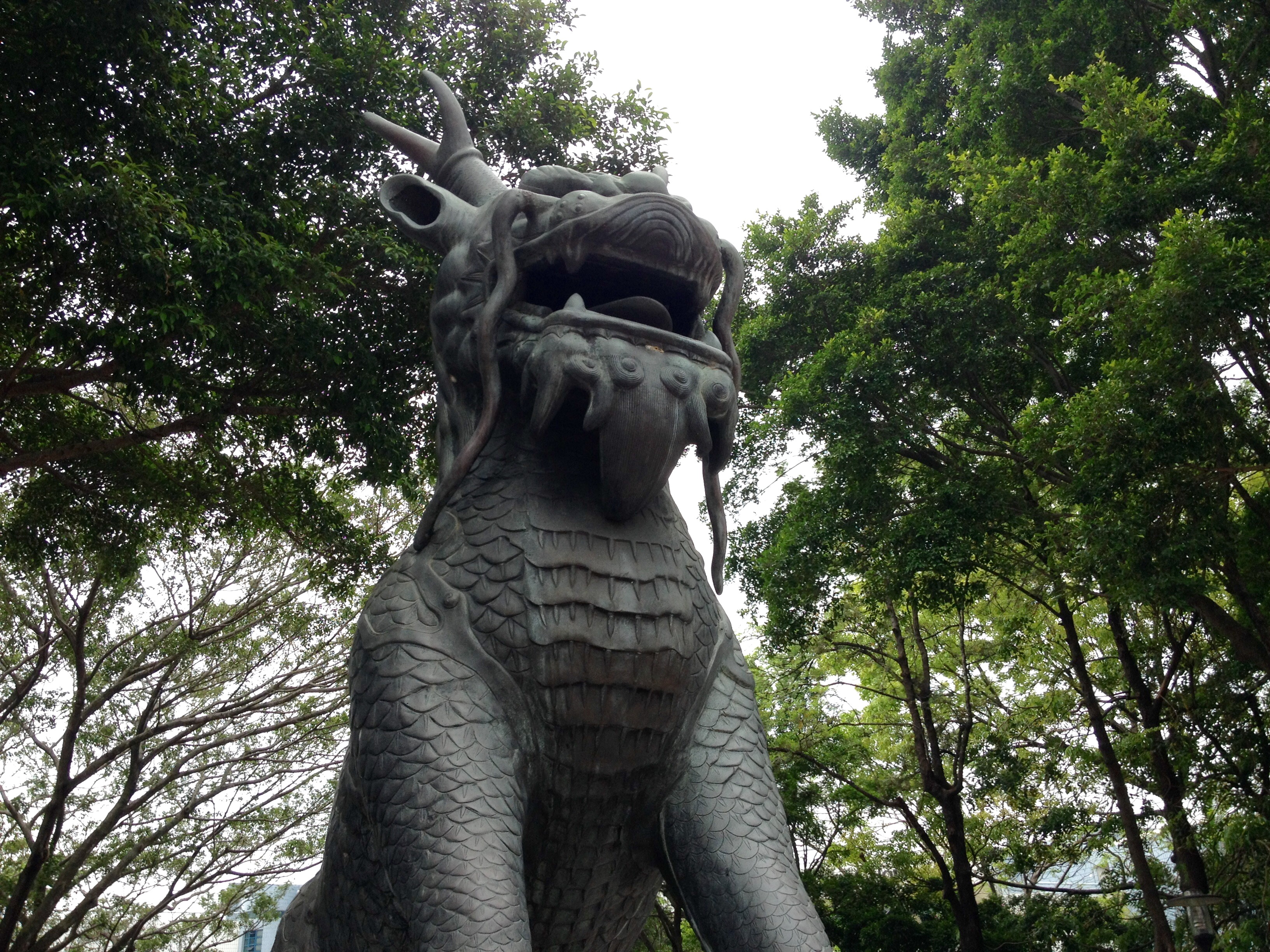
One of the Kirin sculptures near the main entrance

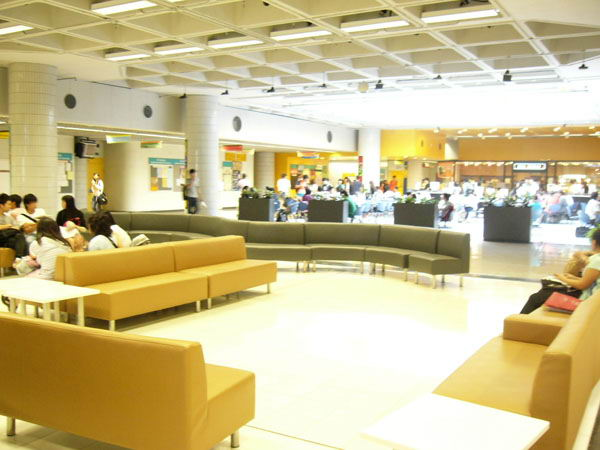
ACAD2

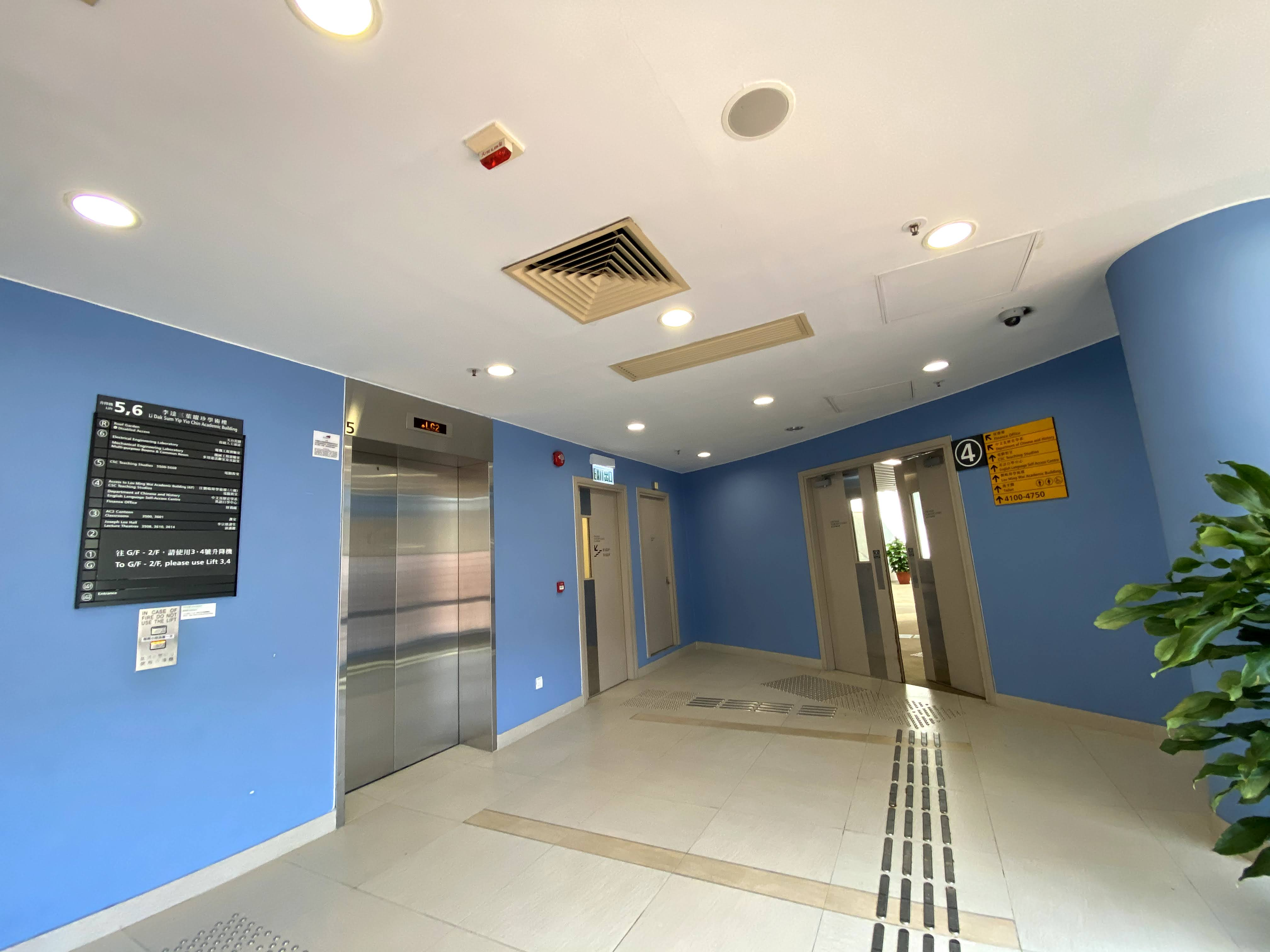
CityU AC2

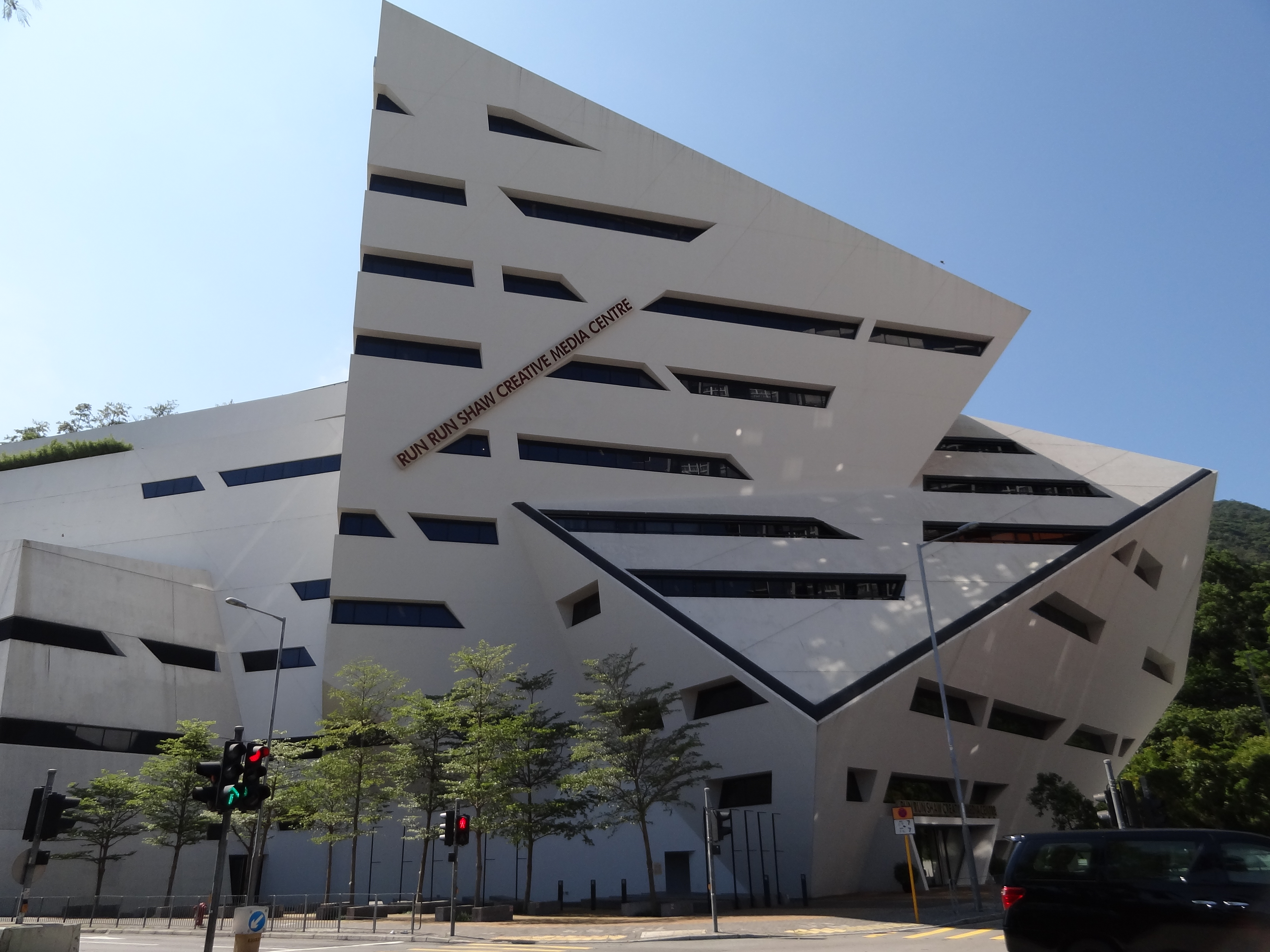
Run Run Shaw Creative Media Centre

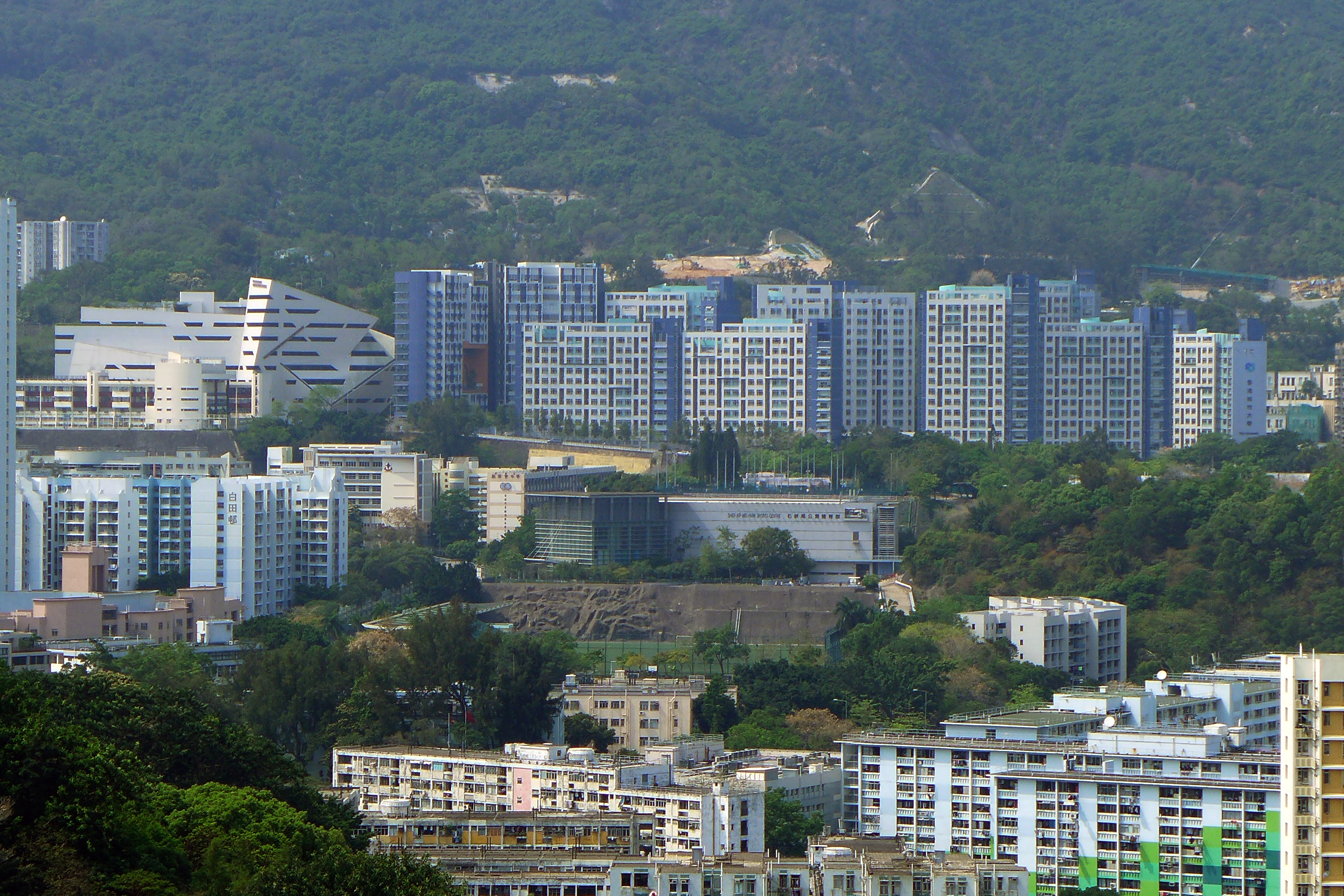
Aerial view of the Student Residences

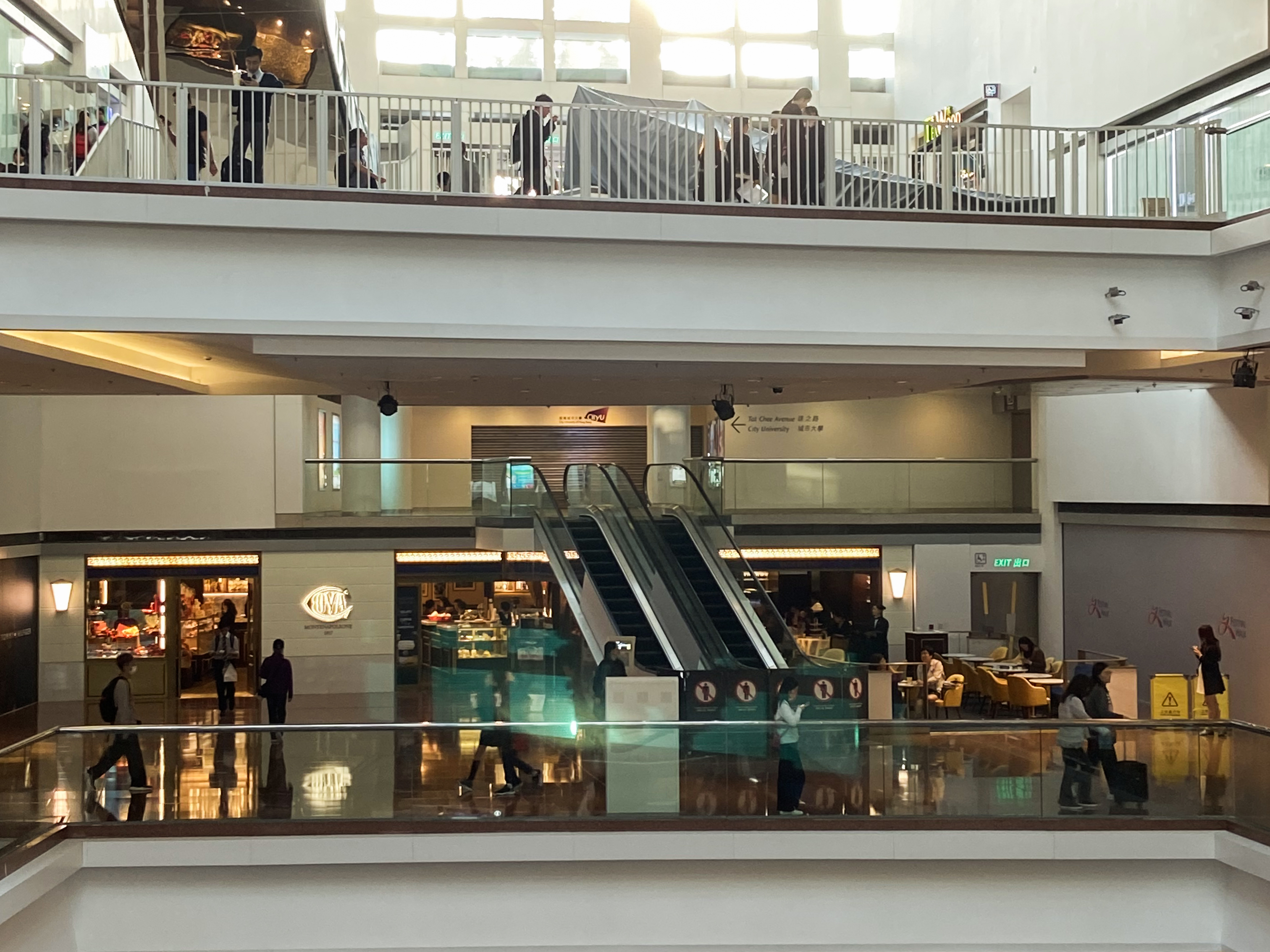
Escalators inside the Festival Walk mall connecting to CityU

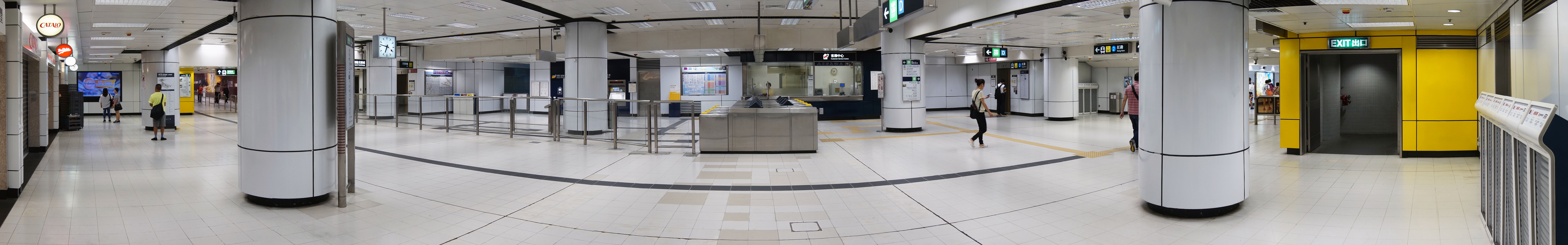
Kowloon Tong MTR Station

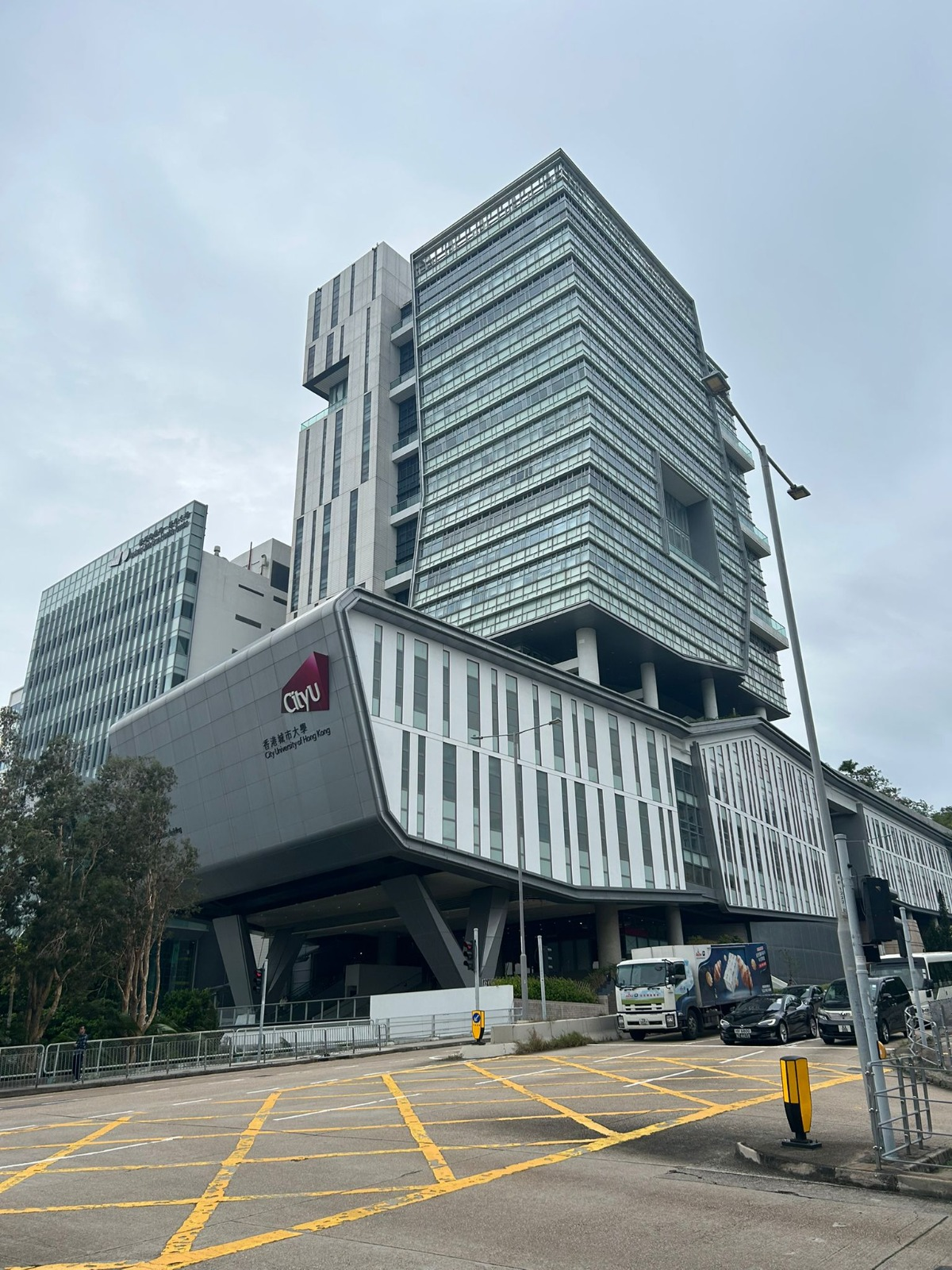
College of Business, Lau Ming Wai Building

== Incidents ==
=== Shut down of MFA in Creative Writing ===
In April 2015, CityU shut down the programme of Master of Fine Arts in Creative Writing. Students and alumni launched a petition against the decision while faculty and noted international writers issued an open letter questioning the reasoning behind the closure. Canadian novelist and faculty member Madeleine Thien, writing in The Guardian, was among those who attributed the decision to censorship and diminishing freedom of expression in Hong Kong.

=== Collapse of roof of sports hall ===
On 20 May 2016, the roof structure of the Chan Tai Ho Multi-purpose Hall (the Sports Hall) in the Hu Fa Kuang Sports Centre (the Sports Centre) collapsed. Two staff members of CityU sustained minor injuries and a third individual was in shock. The venue was originally scheduled to hold an annual celebration banquet on that night for 700–800 CityU student athletes. The investigation report released by the Buildings Department said three factors contributed to the collapse: (1) a leveled layer of material applied to the surface of the roof structure being thicker than the original design, (2) the laying of greenery on the roof, and (3) large puddles of water. CityU did not seek separate advice from an independent surveyor to conduct feasibility studies and designs before tendering out the project to consultants or contractors. A report by CityU's investigation committee concluded that the surveyor of the green roof project was to be held liable for the collapse despite his repeated denial of involvement in the works. It was reported that CityU vice-president Sunny Lee Wai-kwong (who oversaw the Campus Development and Facilities Office) escaped liability while technical staff would face disciplinary action.

=== QS ranking dispute ===
In 2017, CityU was accused of providing misleading information to Quacquarelli Symonds (QS) to boost its university rankings. The QS review, however, confirmed that the data submitted by CityU was accurate. CityU would submit the case to an external audit firm to verify the data. In January 2018, CityU issued a statement stating that it had commissioned an accounting firm to complete an independent review of the student data declared by CityU and confirmed that it found no declarations that did not meet the scope of QS requirements.

=== Chinese Judge Meeting on campus ===
On 20 October 2018, National Judges College under the Supreme People's Court of China uploaded an article to its website about a meeting held by "provisional branches of the Chinese Communist Party" at CityU. According to the article, 39 party members, including Huang Wenjun, president and party secretary of the National Judges College and 11 non-party members, attended the meeting and gave a lecture. Huang told attendees that judges must take a "clear-cut stance" on politics, increase their political sensitivity, learn socialism with Chinese characteristics in the new era led by the Communist Party leader Xi Jinping, and should fight against "incorrect words and deeds." Despite the fact that the party branches were formed by Chinese judges who studied at CityU, Professor Lin Feng (associate dean of CityU's law school) who liaised with the college in organizing the courses, said the lecture "had caught the faculty by surprise". Pro-Beijing legislator Priscilla Leung Mei-fun, an associate law professor at CityU, refused to comment, claiming that she was not aware of the arrangement. Spokesperson for CityU said it maintains political neutrality and that no activities involving politics should be held on campus.

=== Intervention of students' academic autonomy ===
In October 2019, Professor Tan who was teaching a digital marketing course sent an email to the students, which warned the students not to deliver any political messages in class presentations or they will be given zero marks. The e-mail caused dissatisfaction among students. Pro-democracy group Frontline Technology Workers pointed out that the presentations were relevant to the course although it was touching the social taboo. They also highlighted academic journal articles which discussed the relationship between politics and marketing. Students' Union questioned university's promise on academic autonomy.

=== New campus security measures ===
In November 2019, CityU barred all students from entering the campus and the student hostel area as some of the facilities had been damaged by the protestors during the Siege of the Chinese University of Hong Kong. On 30 November, CityU reopened the campus but staff and students were required to present their identity cards to gain entry. By December, hoarding panels had been built around the whole campus and turnstiles had been installed at all entrances. CityU issued a press release, stating that the vast majority of members of the Senate and the Court of CityU supported the security measures and the installation of an electronic access system. The Student Union stressed that it opposed and had voted in the Court's meeting against the installation of turnstiles. The Student Union quoted an earlier questionnaire survey conducted by CityU Staff Association, stating that most of the respondents agreed that "university campuses should be opened to the public." The Student Union has repeatedly expressed objections to the university's policy of prohibiting public access to the campus and urged the university to consult teachers and students on the issue.

== See also ==
- College of Business, City University of Hong Kong
- Community College of City University
- Run Run Shaw Library
- Democracy Wall (City University of Hong Kong)
- Education in Hong Kong
- Hong Kong
