= Keith Lam (artist) =

New media artist in Hong Kong

- 林欣傑
- Born: 1980 (age 45–46)
- Education: City University of Hong Kong
- Years active: 2003 – Present
- Known for: New Media Art, Performance Art, Installation Art, Generative Art
- Awards: Honorary Mentions (Interactive Arts), PRIX Ars Electronica, Linz, Austria (2008); Young Artist Award, Hong Kong Arts Development Awards, Hong Kong (2008); Art Division Jury Selections (Interactive Art), Japan Media Arts Festival, Tokyo, Japan (2013); Artist of the Year (Media Arts), Hong Kong Arts Development Awards, Hong Kong (2024)
- Website: https://keithlyk.net https://dimensionplus.co/

Keith Lam (Chinese: 林欣傑; born in 1980) is a Hong Kong new media artist. He is the co-founder and artistic director of Dimension Plus, an arts & technology team based in Hong Kong and Taiwan, dedicated to the creation and curation of artistic and technological projects.

Lam presented Moving Mario at the 11th Microwave International New Media Arts Festival, Hong Kong, in 2007, and was awarded Honorary Mentions in Interactive Arts at PRIX Ars Electronica, Linz, Austria, in 2008. He was the recipient of the Young Artist Award at the 3rd Hong Kong Arts Development Awards, Hong Kong, the same year. In 2013, Lam's work One Day Social Sculpture was awarded Art Division Jury Selections in Interactive Art at the 17th Japan Media Arts Festival, Tokyo, Japan. In 2024, he was awarded Artist of the Year (Media Arts) at the 18th Hong Kong Arts Development Awards, Hong Kong.

== Early life and education ==
Lam received a scholarship to attend New York University in 2000 and a subsidy to further his education in New Media Arts at Hong Kong Art School. He joined the School of Creative Media at the City University of Hong Kong as a Research Assistant and was appointed as a full-time teaching staff member from 2004 to 2009. In 2005, he obtained Master of Science in Electronic Information Engineering at the same university.

Early 2009, Lam became a full-time artist and co-founded Dimension Plus with Taiwanese curator Escher Tsai. In late 2023, Dimension Plus was selected as one of the venue partners of East Kowloon Cultural Centre for the period of 2024 to 2026 in Hong Kong.

== Works ==
Lam's practice spans sculpture, installation and performance, exploring connections between technology, humanity and nature. His work often engages with sensory experience and perception, combining different artistic elements across art and technology.

One of Lam's notable works, Soundscape of Body (2018) exemplifies his approach which involves staging the flow of energy through bodies, and transforms the visual and tactile senses into thought-provoking artistic expressions that encourage viewers to reassess their perception of art. The work was created for the HKU Body Donation Day 2018 of the LKS Faculty of Medicine at the University of Hong Kong. The Seasons Field (2023) commissioned by Hong Kong Museum of Art, is a site-specific installation that draws inspiration from the paintings of Xie Zhiliu and Chen Peiqiu, which depicted the beauty of nature.

== Curatorial projects ==
Lam has been actively involved in a diverse range of curatorial projects both independently and with Dimension Plus. These projects include Project Playaround, Hong Kong (2023), Hylozoism: An Arts & Technology Exhibition, HKDI Gallery, Hong Kong (2022), and Sensory Canvas, Ming Contemporary Art Museum, Shanghai, China (2019).

Project Playaround, Hong Kong (2023) is a comprehensive programme fosters collaboration, innovation, and creativity among performing and media artists. It is an extended version of the Playaround Workshop that was held in Taipei, Taiwan in 2007 and supported by the Arts Capacity Development Funding Scheme. Hylozoism: An Arts & Technology Exhibition, HKDI Gallery, Hong Kong (2022) is an exhibition co-curated with Hong Kong curator Joel Kwong that seeks to explore the impact of human intervention and technology on nature in the context of arts and technology.
