= College of Business, City University of Hong Kong =

College at the City University of Hong Kong

- 香港城市大學商學院
- Established: 1990
- Dean: Professor Kalok CHAN
- Academic staff: ~160
- Address: Kowloon Tong, Kowloon, Hong Kong
- Affiliations: City University of Hong Kong
- Website: www.cb.cityu.edu.hk

The College of Business (CB) is one of the five colleges at the City University of Hong Kong (CityU).

Founded in 1990, CB has six departments providing undergraduate and postgraduate programs.

== Accreditation ==
CB is accredited by the Association to Advance Collegiate Schools of Business and the European Quality Improvement System.

== Rankings ==
CB is ranked 32nd worldwide and 2nd in Asia in the 2020 UT Dallas rankings, based on research contributions from 2013-2017 in 24 leading journals in major business disciplines. It was ranked 58th worldwide and 5th in Asia in Economics and Business, in the U.S. News & World Report 2018 Best Global Universities rankings.

CityU was ranked 52nd worldwide for the subject of "Business and Economics" by T.H.E. in 2023.

== Controversies ==
=== Intervention of students' academic autonomy by Prof. TAN Yong Chin from the Department of Marketing ===
In October 2019, professor Tan Yong Chin who was teaching a digital marketing course sent an email to the students, which warned the students not to deliver any political messages in class presentations or they will be given zero marks. The e-mail caused dissatisfaction among the students. Some of them thought that their presentation was solely integrating the related course content with the recent social issues, while they did not call slogans in the classroom or affect the classroom order. They questioned Tan for creating white terror.

- The Student Union of CityU cross-checked the University Assessment Policy and Principles for Taught Programmes, and considered the marking policy of Tan to be violating the policy of the university and the university's promise of protecting freedom of speech
- Pro-democracy group Frontline Technology Workers pointed out that the relevant presentations were highly relevant to the course although it was touching the social controversies and criticized the professor for creating troubles and dispute. They also highlighted many academic journal articles which discussed the relationship between politics and marketing.
