= List of libraries in Hong Kong =

This is a list of libraries in Hong Kong.

== Public libraries and other libraries open to the public ==
The Hong Kong Public Library consists of 71 libraries organised by district.

Region	District	Name	Chinese name	Address
Hong Kong Island	Central and Western	City Hall Public Library	大會堂公共圖書館	2-6/F. & 8-11/F., City Hall High Block, Central, Hong Kong
Hong Kong Island	Central and Western	Shek Tong Tsui Public Library	石塘咀公共圖書館	3-4 /F., Shek Tong Tsui Municipal Services Building, 470 Queen's Road West, Hong Kong
Hong Kong Island	Central and Western	Smithfield Public Library	士美非路公共圖書館	3/F., Smithfield Municipal Services Building, 12K Smithfield, Kennedy Town, Hong Kong
Hong Kong Island	Eastern	Chai Wan Public Library	柴灣公共圖書館	4-5/F., Chai Wan Municipal Services Building, 338 Chai Wan Road, Chai Wan
Hong Kong Island	Eastern	Electric Road Public Library	電氣道公共圖書館	2/F., Electric Road Municipal Services Building, 229 Electric Road, Hong Kong
Hong Kong Island	Eastern	North Point Public Library	北角公共圖書館	G/F., North Point Market Building, Pak Fuk Road, North Point, Hong Kong
Hong Kong Island	Eastern	Quarry Bay Public Library	鰂魚涌公共圖書館	4-5/F., Quarry Bay Municipal Services Building, 38 Quarry Bay Street, Quarry Bay, Hong Kong
Hong Kong Island	Eastern	Siu Sai Wan Public Library	小西灣公共圖書館	G/F, Siu Sai Wan Complex, 15 Siu Sai Wan Road, Chai Wan, Hong Kong
Hong Kong Island	Eastern	Yiu Tung Public Library	耀東公共圖書館	G/F., Yiu Cheong House, Yiu Tung Estate, Shau Kei Wan, Hong Kong
Hong Kong Island	Southern	Aberdeen Public Library	香港仔公共圖書館	3/F., Aberdeen Municipal Services Building, 203 Aberdeen Main Road, Aberdeen
Hong Kong Island	Southern	Ap Lei Chau Public Library	鴨脷洲公共圖書館	5/F., Ap Lei Chau Municipal Services Building, 8 Hung Shing Street, Ap Lei Chau
Hong Kong Island	Southern	Pok Fu Lam Public Library	薄扶林公共圖書館	Units No. 611-619, Wah Chun House, Wah Fu Estate
Hong Kong Island	Southern	Stanley Public Library	赤柱公共圖書館	Upper Ground Floor, Stanley Municipal Services Building, 6 Stanley Market Road, Stanley
Hong Kong Island	Wan Chai	Hong Kong Central Library	香港中央圖書館	66 Causeway Road, Causeway Bay
Hong Kong Island	Wan Chai	Lockhart Road Public Library	駱克道公共圖書館	3-5/F., Lockhart Road Municipal Services Building, 225 Hennessy Road
Hong Kong Island	Wan Chai	Wong Nai Chung Public Library	黃泥涌公共圖書館	3/F., Wong Nai Chung Municipal Services Building, 2, Yuk Sau Street, Happy Valley
Kowloon	Kowloon City	Hung Hom Public Library	紅磡公共圖書館	6/F., Hung Hom Municipal Services Building, 11 Ma Tau Wai Road
Kowloon	Kowloon City	Kowloon Public Library	九龍公共圖書館	5 Pui Ching Road
Kowloon	Kowloon City	Kowloon City Public Library	九龍城公共圖書館	3/F., Kowloon City Municipal Services Building, 100 Nga Tsin Wai Road
Kowloon	Kowloon City	To Kwa Wan Public Library	土瓜灣公共圖書館	5-6/F., To Kwa Wan Market & Government Offices, 165 Ma Tau Wai Road
Kowloon	Kwun Tong	Lam Tin Public Library	藍田公共圖書館	5-6/F., Lam Tin Complex, 1 Hing Tin Street, Lam Tin
Kowloon	Kwun Tong	Lei Yue Mun Public Library	鯉魚門公共圖書館	1/F., Lei Yue Mun Municipal Services Building, 6 Lei Yue Mun Path, Kwun Tong
Kowloon	Kwun Tong	Ngau Tau Kok Public Library	牛頭角公共圖書館	2-3/F., Ngau Tau Kok Municipal Services Building, 183 Ngau Tau Kok Road
Kowloon	Kwun Tong	Sau Mau Ping Public Library	秀茂坪公共圖書館	Units No. 104-109, G/F., Sau Ming House, Sau Mau Ping Estate
Kowloon	Kwun Tong	Shui Wo Street Public Library	瑞和街公共圖書館	5-6/F., Shui Wo Street Municipal Services Building, 9 Shui Wo Street, Kwun Tong
Kowloon	Kwun Tong	Shun Lee Public Library	順利邨公共圖書館	3/F, Shun Lee Tsuen Sports Centre, No. 33, Shun Lee Tsuen Road, Kwun Tong
Kowloon	Sham Shui Po	Lai Chi Kok Public Library	荔枝角公共圖書館	G/F - 1/F., 19 Lai Wan Road, Lai Chi Kok
Kowloon	Sham Shui Po	Po On Road Public Library	保安道公共圖書館	1/F., Po On Road Municipal Services Building, 325-329 Po On Road, Sham Shui Po
Kowloon	Sham Shui Po	Sham Shui Po Public Library	深水埗公共圖書館	G/F & 1/F, Sham Shui Po Leisure and Cultural Building, 38 Sham Mong Road, Sham Shui Po
Kowloon	Sham Shui Po	Shek Kip Mei Public Library	石硤尾公共圖書館	7/F, Shek Kip Mei Estate Ancillary Facilities Block, 100 Woh Chai Street, Shek Kip Mei, Sham Shui Po
Kowloon	Sham Shui Po	Un Chau Street Public Library	元州街公共圖書館	1/F., Un Chau Street Municipal Services Building, 59-63, Un Chau Street
Kowloon	Wong Tai Sin	Fu Shan Public Library	富山公共圖書館	Units 1-4, LG 1, Fu Yan House, Fu Shan Estate, Po Kong Village Road
Kowloon	Wong Tai Sin	Lok Fu Public Library	樂富公共圖書館	Shop No. 112, 3/F., Lok Fu Plaza, Junction Road
Kowloon	Wong Tai Sin	Lung Hing Public Library	龍興公共圖書館	North Wing, G/F., Lung Hing House, Lower Wong Tai Sin (II) Estate
Kowloon	Wong Tai Sin	Ngau Chi Wan Public Library	牛池灣公共圖書館	5-6/F., Ngau Chi Wan Municipal Services Building, 11 Clear Water Bay Road
Kowloon	Wong Tai Sin	San Po Kong Public Library	新蒲崗公共圖書館	3/F., San Po Kong Plaza, 33 Shung Ling Street, San Po Kong
Kowloon	Wong Tai Sin	Tsz Wan Shan Public Library	慈雲山公共圖書館	Shop 702, Tsz Wan Shan Shopping Centre, Tsz Wan Shan
Kowloon	Yau Tsim Mong	Fa Yuen Street Public Library	花園街公共圖書館	4-5/F., Fa Yuen Street Municipal Services Building, 123A Fa Yuen Street, Mong Kok
Kowloon	Yau Tsim Mong	Tai Kok Tsui Public Library	大角咀公共圖書館	3/F., Tai Kok Tsui Municipal Services Building, 63 Fuk Tsun Street, Tai Kok Tsui
Kowloon	Yau Tsim Mong	Tsim Sha Tsui Public Library	尖沙咀公共圖書館	1/F., Concordia Plaza, 1 Science Museum Road, Tsim Sha Tsui East
Kowloon	Yau Tsim Mong	Yau Ma Tei Public Library	油蔴地公共圖書館	G. & M/F., 250 Shanghai Street, Yau Ma Tei
New Territories	Kwai Tsing	North Kwai Chung Public Library	北葵涌公共圖書館	2/F & 3/F North Kwai Chung Market & Library, Shek Yam Road, Kwai Chung
New Territories	Kwai Tsing	South Kwai Chung Public Library	南葵涌公共圖書館	4/F, Kwai Hing Government Offices, 166-174 Hing Fong Road, Kwai Chung
New Territories	Kwai Tsing	Tsing Yi Public Library	青衣公共圖書館	1/F, Tsing Yi Municipal Services Building, 38 Tsing Luk Street, Tsing Yi
New Territories	Tsuen Wan	Tsuen Wan Public Library	荃灣公共圖書館	38 Sai Lau Kok Road, Tsuen Wan
New Territories	Tsuen Wan	Shek Wai Kok Public Library	石圍角公共圖書館	Unit Nos. 215 -219, Shek Fong House, Shek Wai Kok Estate, Tsuen Wan
New Territories	Tuen Mun	Butterfly Estate Public Library	蝴蝶邨公共圖書館	Unit Nos. 123 - 130, Ground Floor, Tip Chui House, Butterfly Estate, Tuen Mun
New Territories	Tuen Mun	Tuen Mun Public Library	屯門公共圖書館	1 Tuen Hi Road, Tuen Mun
New Territories	Tuen Mun	Tai Hing Public Library	大興公共圖書館	Unit No. 80, 1/F, Commercial Complex, Tai Hing Estate, Tuen Mun
New Territories	Yuen Long	Ping Shan Tin Shui Wai Public Library	屏山天水圍公共圖書館	High Block, Ping Shan Tin Shui Wai Leisure and Cultural Building, 1 Tsui Sing Road, Tin Shui Wai
New Territories	Yuen Long	Tin Shui Wai North Public Library	天水圍北公共圖書館	Shop 313, Tin Chak Shopping Centre, Tin Chak Estate, Tin Shui Wai
New Territories	Yuen Long	Yuen Long Public Library	元朗公共圖書館	1/F, Yuen Long Government Offices, 2 Kiu Lok Square, Yuen Long
New Territories	North	Fanling Public Library	粉嶺公共圖書館	2/F, 9 Wo Mun Street, Fanling
New Territories	North	Fanling South Public Library	粉嶺南公共圖書館	Shop Nos. G15 & G16, Dawning Views Shopping Plaza, 23 Yat Ming Road, Fanling
New Territories	North	Sha Tau Kok Public Library	沙頭角公共圖書館	Shop 1, G/F, Block 20, Sha Tau Kok Chuen, Sha Tau Kok
New Territories	North	Sheung Shui Public Library	上水公共圖書館	3/F, Shek Wu Hui Municipal Services Building, 13 Chi Cheong Road, Sheung Shui
New Territories	Tai Po	Tai Po Public Library	大埔公共圖書館	5/F, Tai Po Complex, 8 Heung Sze Wui Street, Tai Po
New Territories	Sha Tin	Lek Yuen Public Library	瀝源公共圖書館	Units 101 - 110, G/F, Kwai Wo House, Lek Yuen Estate, Sha Tin
New Territories	Sha Tin	Sha Tin Public Library	沙田公共圖書館	1 Yuen Wo Road, Sha Tin
New Territories	Sha Tin	Ma On Shan Public Library	馬鞍山公共圖書館	14 On Chun Street, Ma On Shan, Sha Tin
New Territories	Sha Tin	Yuen Chau Kok Public Library	圓洲角公共圖書館	35 Ngan Shing Street, Sha Tin
New Territories	Sai Kung	Sai Kung Public Library	西貢公共圖書館	5/F, Sai Kung Government Offices, 34 Chan Man Street, Sai Kung
New Territories	Sai Kung	Tiu Keng Leng Public Library	調景嶺公共圖書館	Chui Ling Road, Tseung Kwan O
New Territories	Sai Kung	Tseung Kwan O Public Library	將軍澳公共圖書館	9, Wan Lung Road, Tseung Kwan O
New Territories	Islands	Cheung Chau Public Library	長洲公共圖書館	2/F, Cheung Chau Municipal Services Building, 2 Tai Hing Tai Road, Cheung Chau
New Territories	Islands	Mui Wo Public Library	梅窩公共圖書館	G/F, Mui Wo Municipal Services Building, 9 Ngan Shek Street, Mui Wo, Lantau Island
New Territories	Islands	North Lamma Public Library	南丫島北段公共圖書館	1 Yung Shue Wan Main Street, Lamma Island
New Territories	Islands	Peng Chau Public Library	坪洲公共圖書館	G/F, Peng Chau Municipal Services Building, 6 Po Peng Street, Peng Chau
New Territories	Islands	South Lamma Public Library	南丫島南段公共圖書館	Second Street, Sok Kwu Wan, Lamma Island
New Territories	Islands	Tai O Public Library	大澳公共圖書館	Shop No. 12, Commercial Centre, Lung Tin Estate, Tai O, Lantau Island
New Territories	Islands	Tung Chung Public Library	東涌公共圖書館	G-1/F Tung Chung Municipal Services Building, 39 Man Tung Road, Tung Chung

== University libraries ==
- The Chinese University of Hong Kong
  - Architecture Library
  - Ch'ien Mu Library, New Asia College
  - Li Ping Medical Library
  - Elisabeth Luce Moore Library, Chung Chi College
  - University Library
  - Wu Chung Multimedia Library, United College
- City University of Hong Kong
  - Run Run Shaw Library
- Chu Hai College of Higher Education
- The Hong Kong Academy for Performing Arts
- Hong Kong Baptist University
  - Au Shue Hung Memorial Library(Main Library)
  - Dr. Stephen Riady Chinese Medicine Library
  - Shek Mun Campus Library
  - European Documentation Centre
- The Hong Kong Institute of Education (now called The Education University of Hong Kong).
- The Hong Kong Polytechnic University
- The Hong Kong University of Science and Technology
- Lingnan University
  - Fong Sum Wood Library
- The Hong Kong Metropolitan University
- Hong Kong Shue Yan University
- The University of Hong Kong
  - Dental Library
  - HKU Education Library
  - HKU Fung Ping Shan Library
  - HKU Lui Che Woo Law Library
  - HKU Main Library
  - HKU Music Library
  - HKU Yu Chun Keung Medical Library

== Private libraries ==
- Kwang Hwa Information and Cultural Center
- Sun Yat Sen Library
- Christian Science Reading Room
- Helena May Library

== See also ==
- List of libraries in China
- Copyright law of Hong Kong
- Library associations in Hong Kong
- Mass media in Hong Kong
