= Ping Shan Tin Shui Wai Public Library =

Public library in Hong Kong

- 屏山天水圍公共圖書館
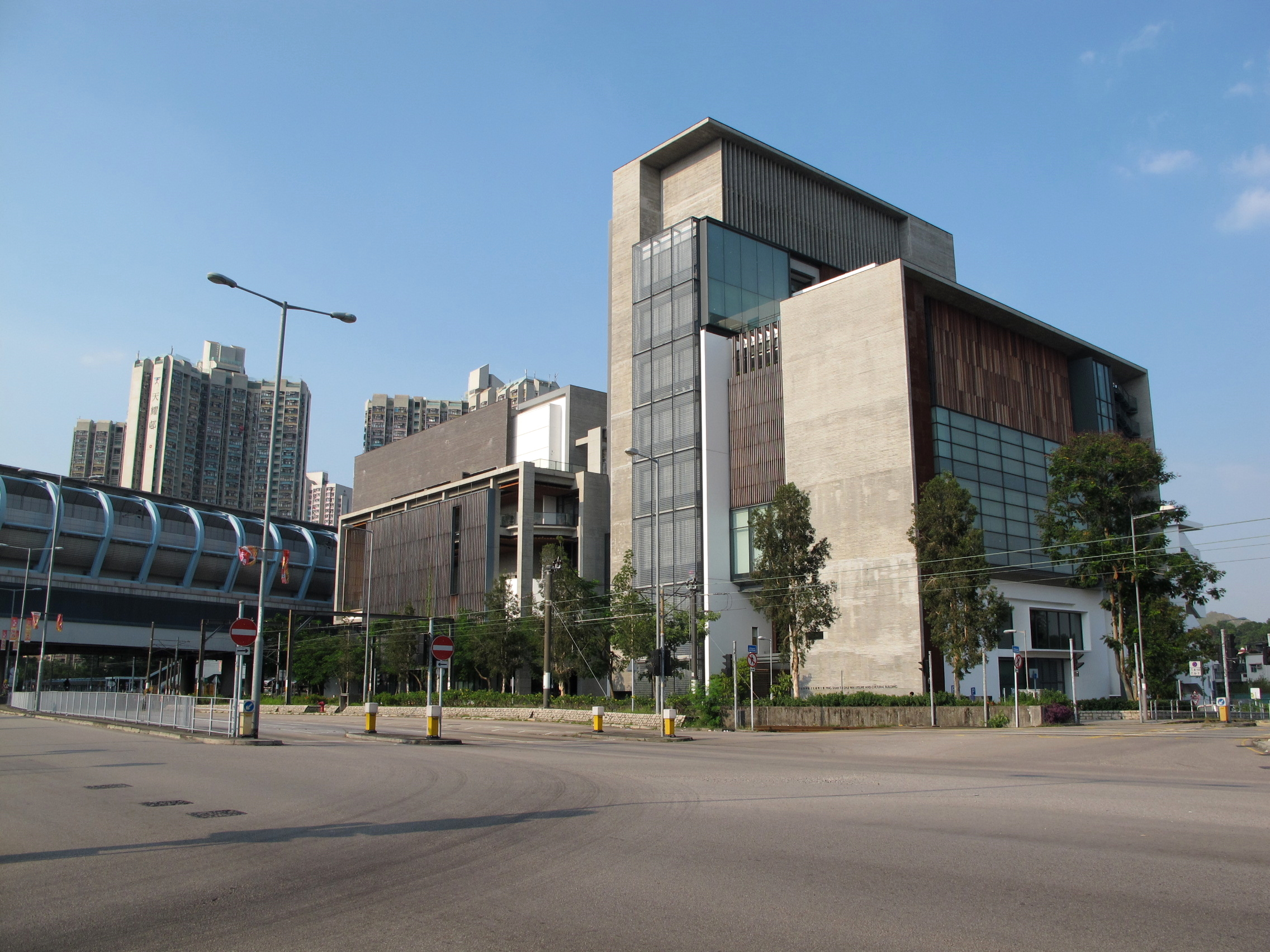
- Ping Shan Tin Shui Wai Leisure and Cultural Building, where the library is located
- 22.447233146326585°N 114.00595689685852°E
- Location: High Block, Ping Shan Tin Shui Wai Leisure and Cultural Building, 1 Tsui Sing Road, Tin Shui Wai, Hong Kong
- Type: Public
- Established: 28 February 2013; 13 years ago

Other information
- Parent organisation: Leisure and Cultural Services Department
- Affiliation: Hong Kong Public Libraries
- Website: Official website

Ping Shan Tin Shui Wai Public Library
- Traditional Chinese: 屏山天水圍公共圖書館
Transcriptions
Yue: Cantonese
- Yale Romanization: Pìhng sāan tīn séui wàih gūng guhng tòuh syū gún
- Jyutping: Ping4 saan1 tin1 soei2 wai4 gung1 gung6 syu1 gun2

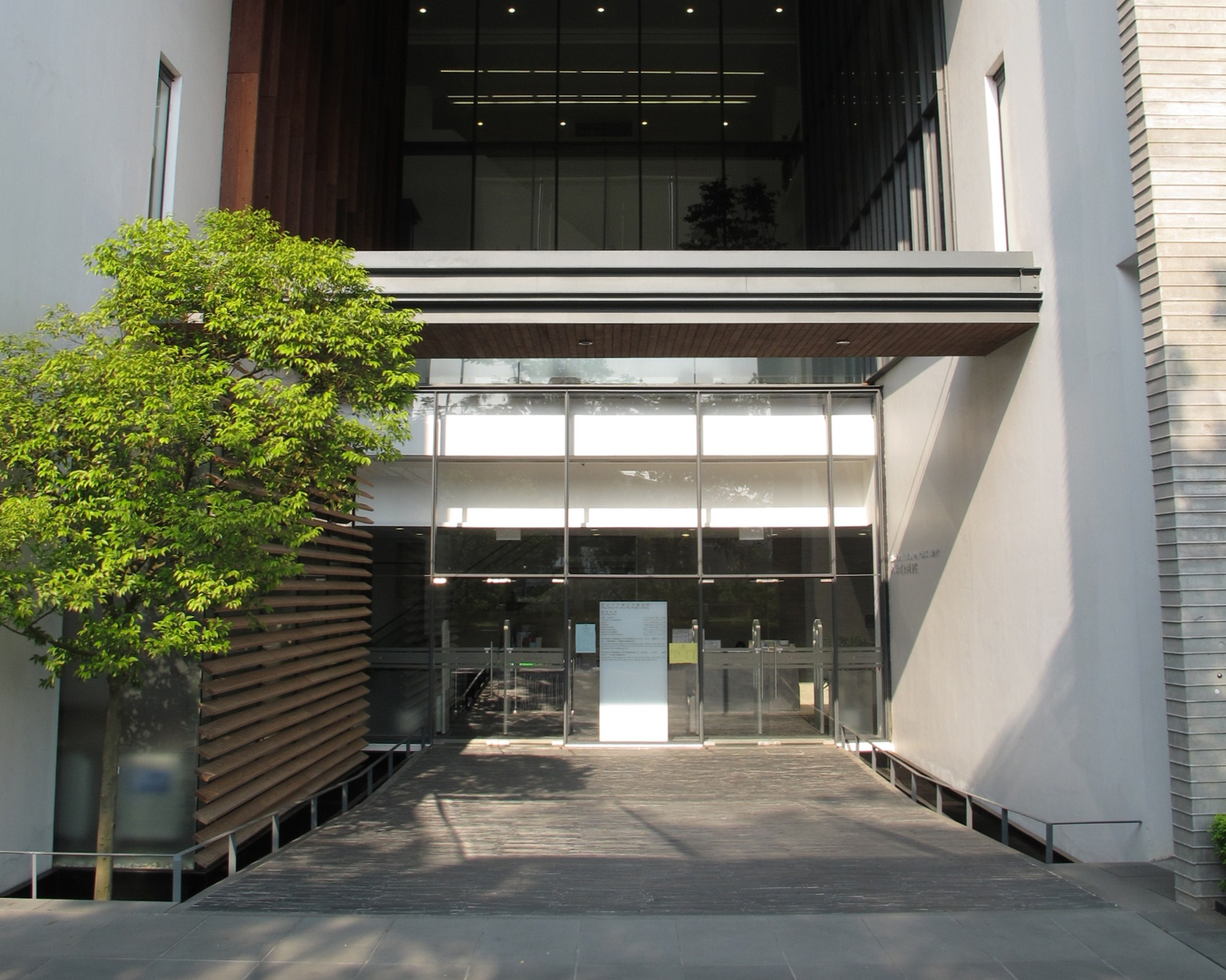
Main entrance

Ping Shan Tin Shui Wai Public Library (Chinese: 屏山天水圍公共圖書館) is a Hong Kong public library. It is located in Ping Shan Tin Shui Wai Leisure and Cultural Building, on 1 Tsui Sing Road, Tin Shui Wai near MTR Tin Shui Wai station and Light Rail Tin Shui Wai stop. It serves the Ping Shan and Tin Shui Wai neighbourhoods, both administratively in the Yuen Long District, the New Territories.

It is managed by the Hong Kong Public Libraries under the Leisure and Cultural Services Department. It has a total floor space of 6,100 square metres (66,000 sq ft), the second largest public library by area in Hong Kong, only behind the Hong Kong Central Library. It is also the first and only library in Hong Kong to date to have outdoor reading areas. There are about 330,000 books within the library's collection.

== History ==
The library opened on 28 February 2013. It replaced an interim district library, called the Tin Shui Wai Public Library, which was housed in leased accommodation at Kingswood Ginza.

== See also ==
- List of libraries in Hong Kong
