= Sha Tin Public Library =

Public library in Hong Kong

- 沙田公共圖書館
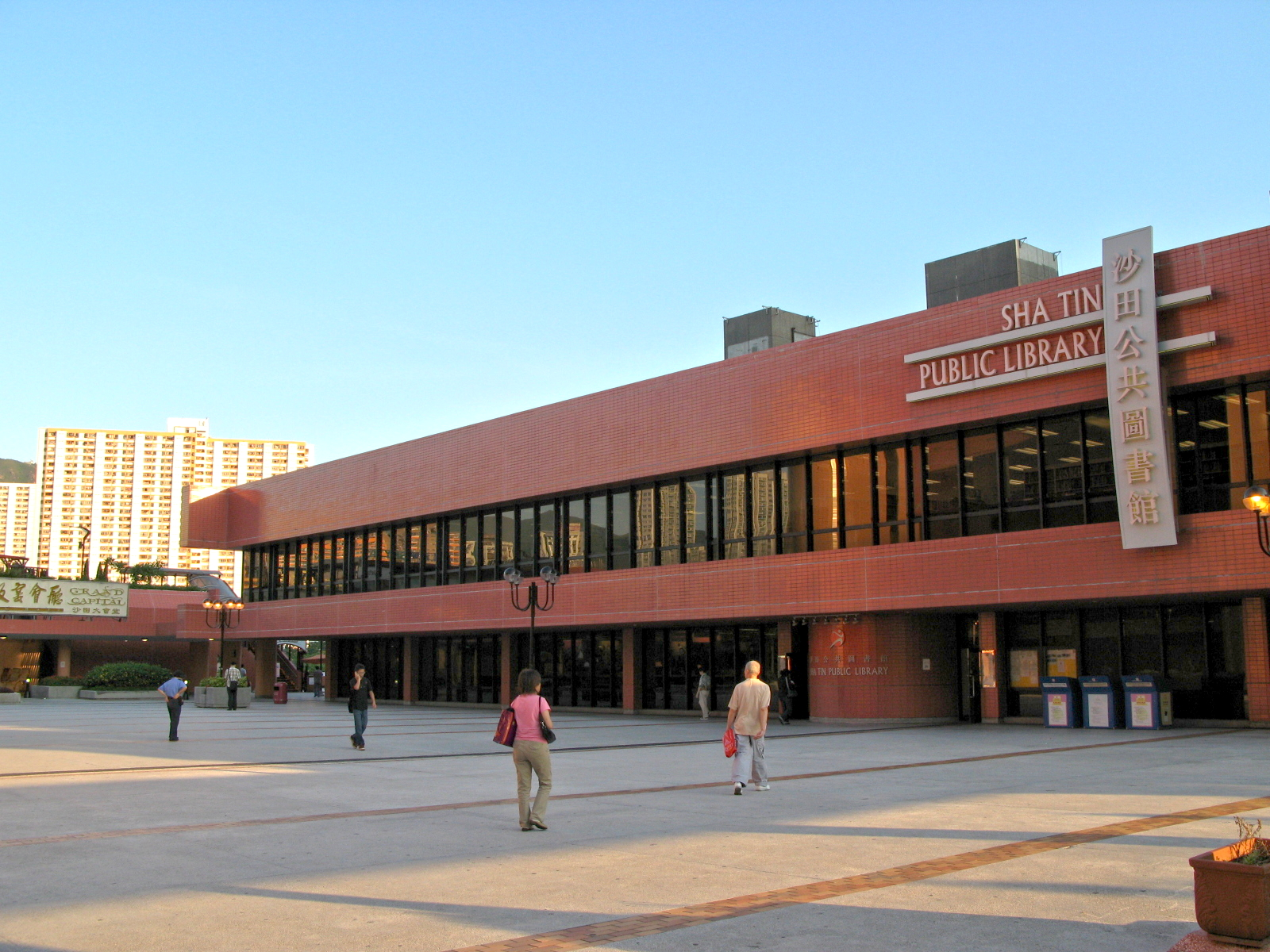
- 22°22′49.95″N 114°11′21.26″E
- Location: 1 Yuen Wo Road, Sha Tin, Hong Kong
- Type: Public
- Established: 16 February 1987

Other information
- Parent organisation: Leisure and Cultural Services Department
- Affiliation: Hong Kong Public Libraries
- Website: Official website

Sha Tin Public Library
- Traditional Chinese: 沙田公共圖書館
Transcriptions
Yue: Cantonese
- Yale Romanization: Sāa tìhn gūng guhng tòuh syū gún
- Jyutping: Saa1 tin4 gung1 gung6 tou4 syu1 gun2

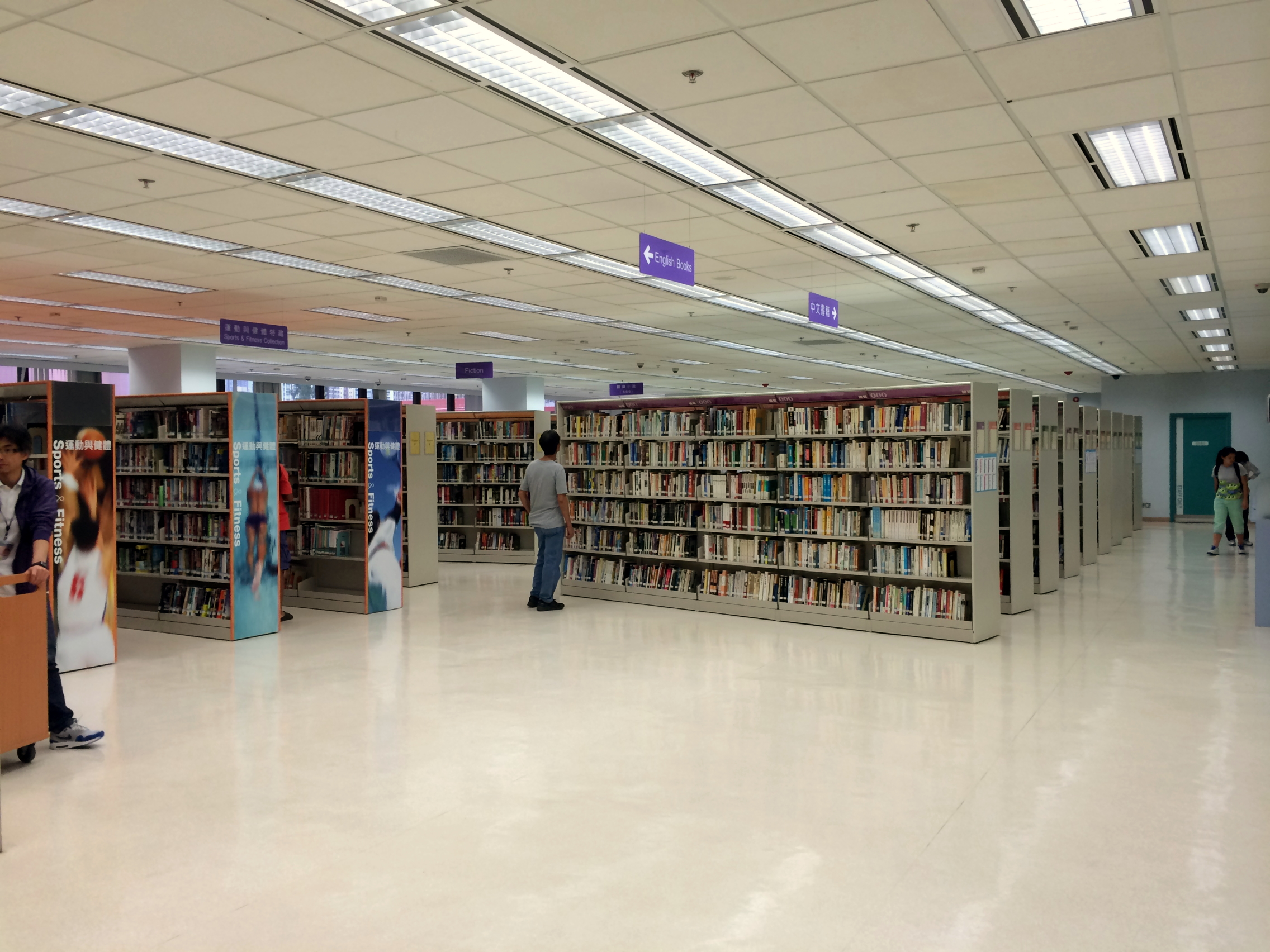
Adult Library

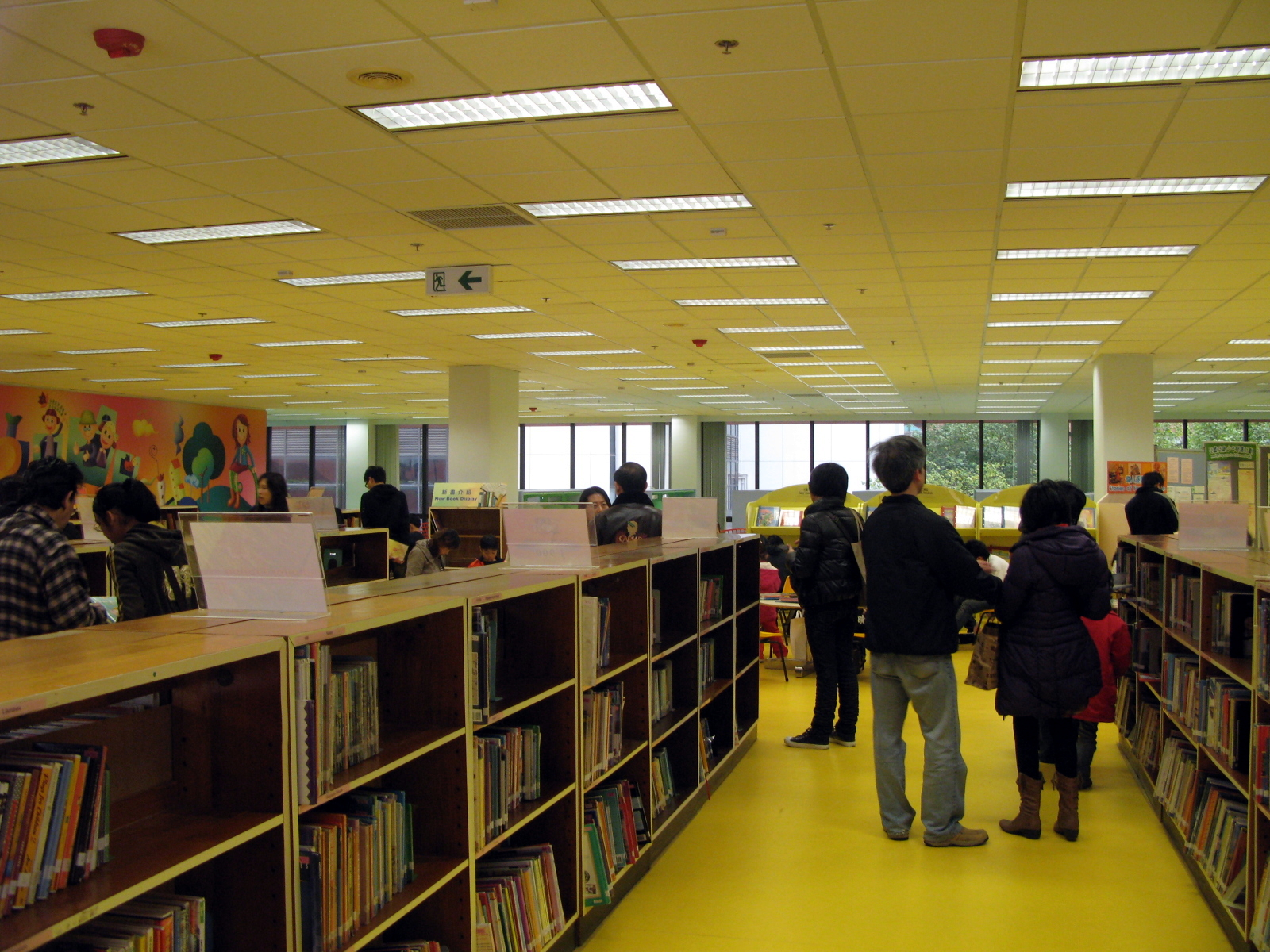
Children's Library

The Sha Tin Public Library (Chinese: 沙田公共圖書館) is a public library located at 1 Yuen Wo Road, Sha Tin, Hong Kong. It has been managed by the Leisure and Cultural Services Department (LCSD) since 2000.

The library has three stories that are open to the public. The first floor houses administration and the students' study room. The main circulation desk and the children's library are on the second floor. The third floor has the adult library, reference library, and computer laboratory.

== History ==
The library was opened on 16 February 1987 as part of the same complex as the Sha Tin Town Hall, Sha Tin Marriage Registry and a restaurant. It was originally managed by the Regional Council. At that time, it was called the Sha Tin Central Library (沙田中央圖書館) before its current name was adopted in 2000. Other adjacent buildings in the town centre include New Town Plaza, Shatin Law Courts, Royal Park Hotel, and New Town Tower.

The exterior of the library was refurbished in the early 2000s as the original glass mosaic tiles, as well as the bonding holding them to the building, had deteriorated. Tiles were prone to suddenly fall, and thus posed a public safety risk. The exterior of the library was completely reclad in a reddish ceramic tile, as were the exteriors of the other buildings in the Sha Tin and Tuen Mun town hall complexes built 1986–87.

The interior of the library was renovated from 2007 to 2008. The reading area was revamped and modernised, additional seating was provided in the students' study room, a new reading corner was built in the children's library and audiovisual equipment was enhanced. Also in 2008, a special "Sports and Fitness Collection" was set up on the third storey. It provides over 18,000 items including books, reports, journals, multimedia, and electronic material.

The LCSD categorises libraries as major, district, or small. Sha Tin Public Library is the only major library in Sha Tin district, and has been assessed as falling short of the prevailing space provision standard for this type of library, as has the district library in nearby Ma On Shan. In order to address this district-wide shortcoming, a new district library was built in nearby Yuen Chau Kok, which opened in 2017.
