= HKPL =

HKPL may refer to:

== Public libraries ==
- Hong Kong Public Libraries, a system of 70 static and 12 mobile public libraries in Hong Kong

== Sports ==
- Hong Kong Premier League, a professional league based in Hong Kong for men's association football clubs
