= Tsing Yi Public Library =

Coordinates: 22.35416°N 114.10651°E

- 青衣公共圖書館
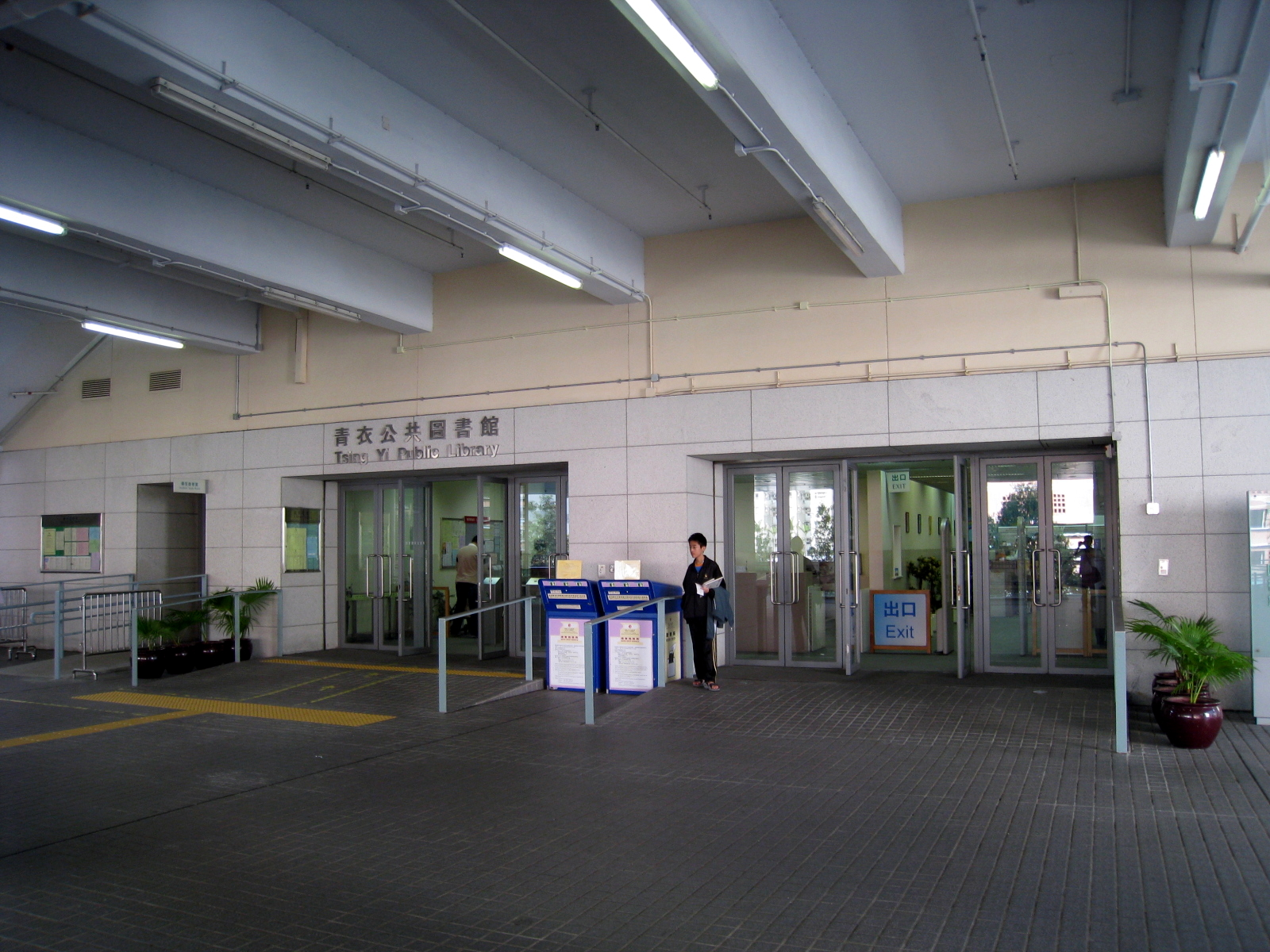
- Location: 1/F, Tsing Yi Municipal Services Building, 38 Tsing Luk Street, Tsing Yi, Hong Kong
- Type: Public
- Established: 21 March 1986; 40 years ago

Other information
- Parent organisation: Leisure and Cultural Services Department
- Affiliation: Hong Kong Public Libraries
- Website: Official website

Tsing Yi Public Library
- Traditional Chinese: 青衣公共圖書館
- Simplified Chinese: 青衣公共图书馆
Transcriptions
Standard Mandarin
- Hanyu Pinyin: Qīngyī Gōnggòng Túshūguǎn
Yue: Cantonese
- Yale Romanization: Chīng yī gūng guhng tòuh syū
- Jyutping: Cing1 ji1 gung1 gung6 tou4 syu1 gun2

Tsing Yi Public Library (Chinese: 青衣公共圖書館) is a public library on Tsing Yi Island, Hong Kong. It is classified as Major District / District Libraries under the system of Hong Kong Public Libraries. Before the library was established, Hong Kong Government provided the islanders with only mobile library service.

== History ==
After the completion of phase IV of Cheung Hong Estate, Tsing Yi Public Library was established on the ground floor of Hong Shing House of the estate on 21 March 1986. Although the library was small, it had one children's library, one adult library and one reference library.

The population of Tsing Yi Island continued to grow rapidly in 1980s and 1990s towards 200,000 as new housing projects were completed in the new town. The Regional Council decided to build a new library which was suggested in new town planning in 1980s. On 31 January 2000, the library moved to the current location, Tsing Yi Municipal Services Building. The library is on a single floor and is more spacious than the old library. Computing facilities and a newspaper reading room was introduced to the library. As the council was disbanded, the library is then managed by the Leisure and Cultural Services Department.

== Facilities ==
- Adult Lending Library
- Children's Library
- Computer Information Centre
- Extension Activities Room
- Multimedia Library
- Newspapers and Periodicals Section
- Reference Section
- Students' Study Room

== Mobile services ==
Although the library in the central location of the new town of Tsing Yi Island, it is too far from the remote part of the new town. There are mobile services provided for Cheung Ching Estate in its south, Cheung Fat Estate in its north and Cheung Wang Estate in its east.

It also lends some of her collections to other organisations on the island.
