= Tsing Yi Municipal Services Building =

Government building in Tsing Yi, Hong Kong

Coordinates: 22.35416°N 114.10651°E

- Traditional Chinese: 青衣市政大廈
- Simplified Chinese: 青衣市政大厦
Transcriptions
Standard Mandarin
- Hanyu Pinyin: Qīngyī Shìzhèng Dàshà
Yue: Cantonese
- Yale Romanization: Chīng yī sih jing daaih haah
- Jyutping: Cing1 ji1 si5 zing3 daai6 haa6

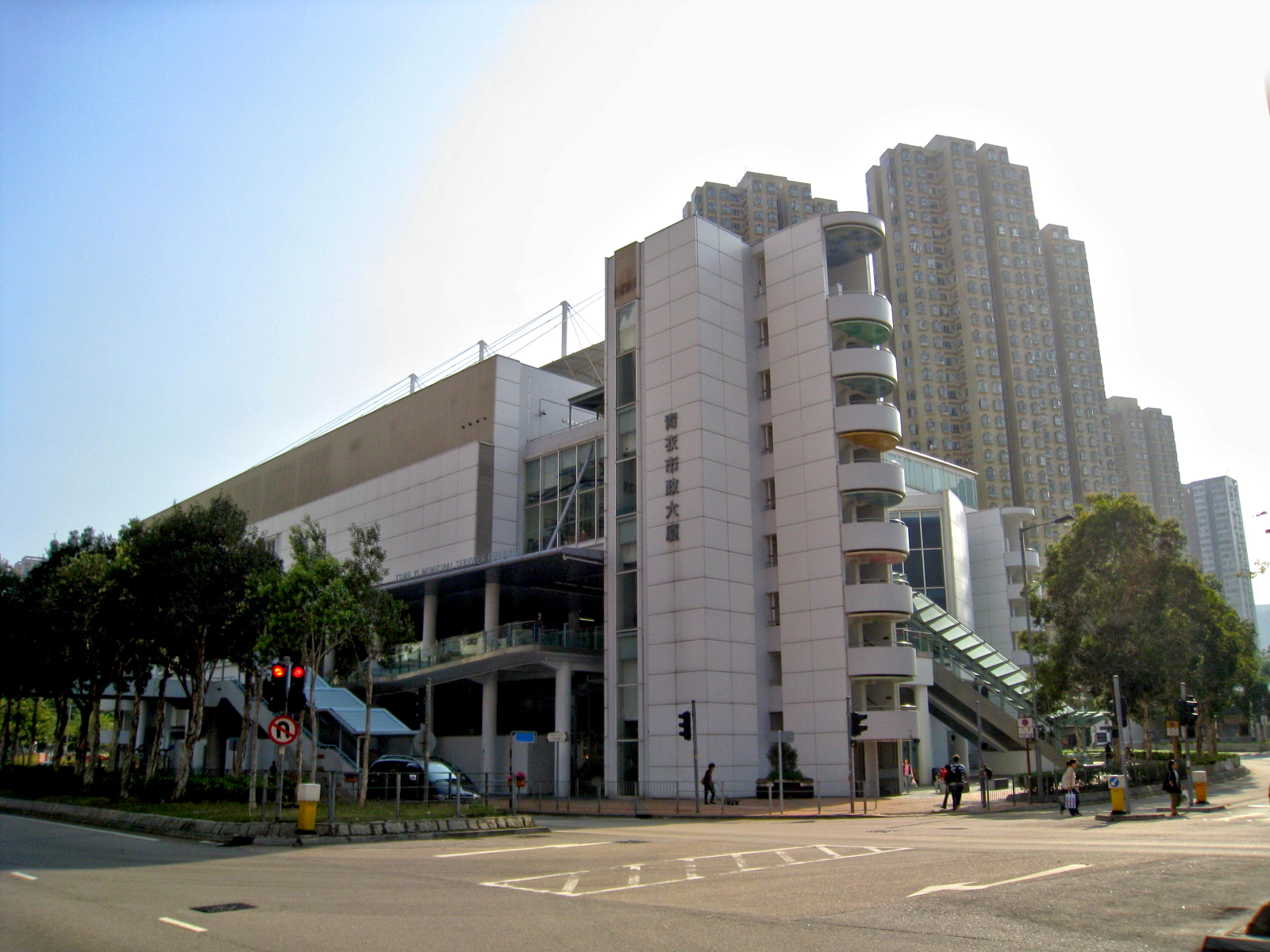
Tsing Yi Municipal Services Building

Tsing Yi Municipal Services Building, also known as Tsing Yi Complex, formerly Tsing Yi Regional Council Complex, is a multi-purpose municipal building for the Tsing Yi Island, Hong Kong. It was built by the former Regional Council. The building hosts Tsing Yi Public Library, Tsing Yi Indoor Recreation Centre, Tsing Yi Market, and offices for Hong Kong Government.

== History ==
The building was completed in March 1999. It building cost about HK$292 million.

The building was jointly designed by the Architectural Services Department and Andrew Ng Architects Limited. It received a Certificate of Merit at the 1999 Hong Kong Institute of Architects Annual Awards.

== Description ==
The ground floor of the complex houses a market. The first floor is home to a public library. The second floor houses an indoor sports centre with an arena, squash courts, and a fitness room. The complex also has several public art pieces.

== Photo gallery ==
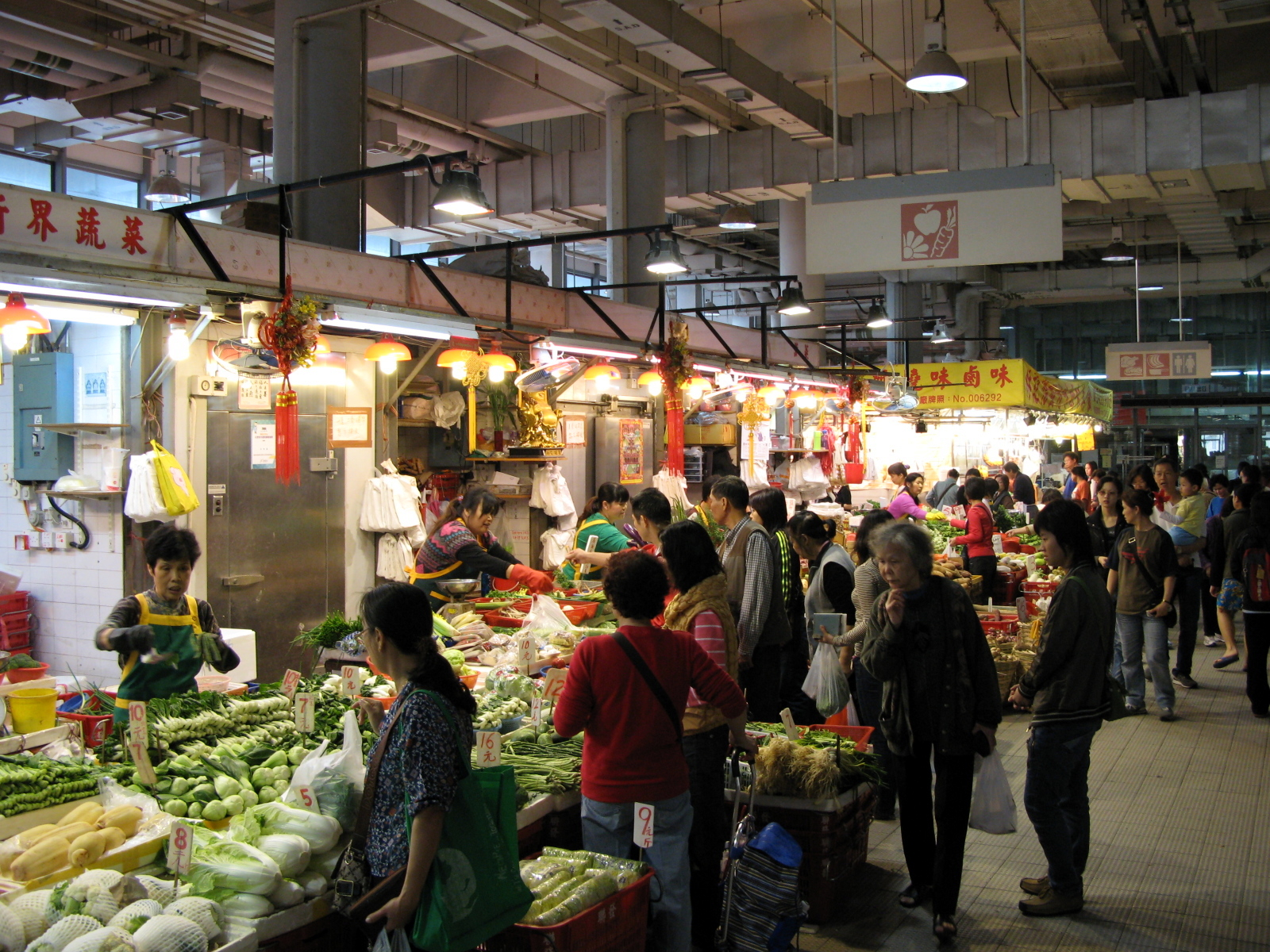
Market

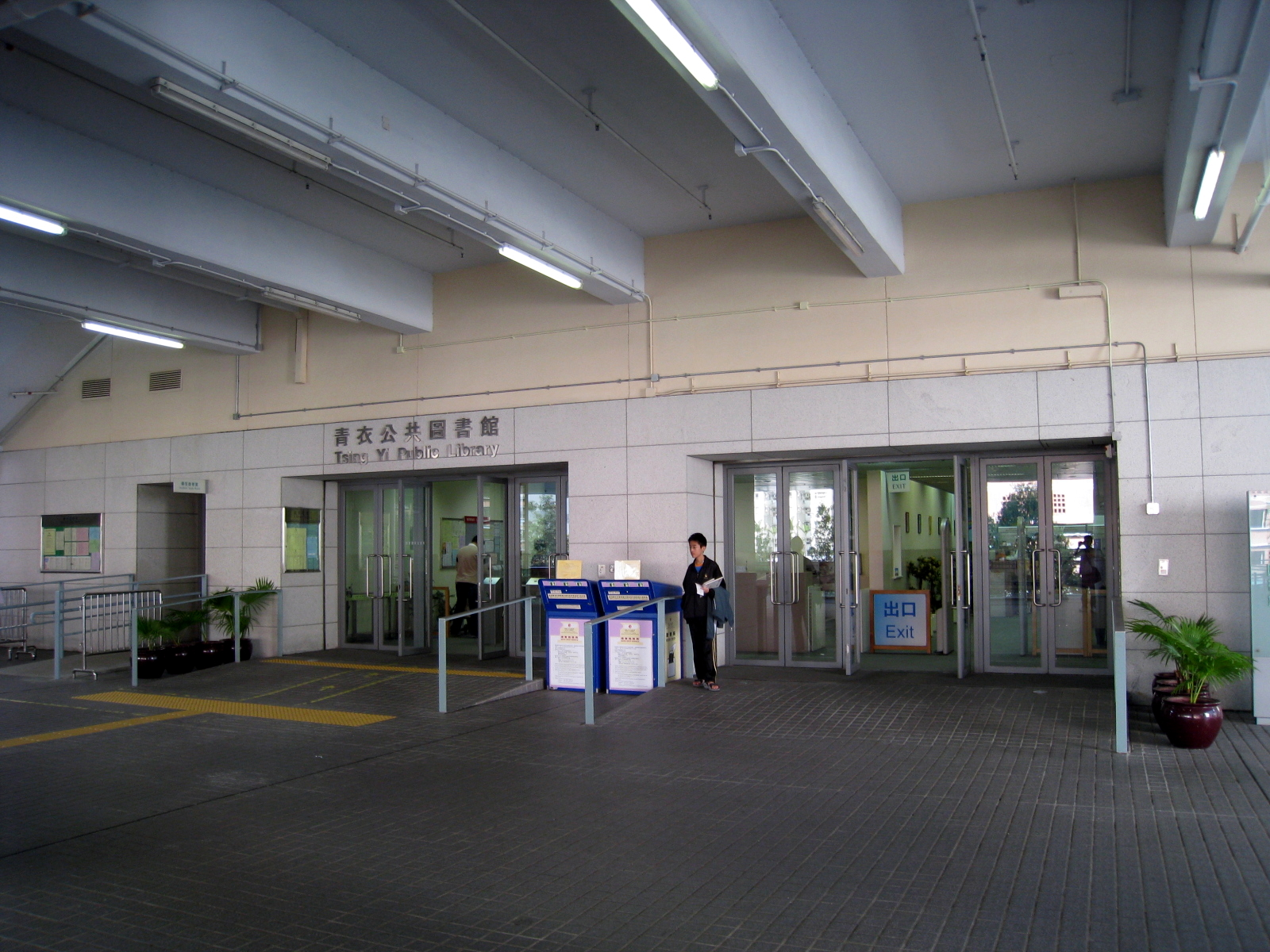
Tsing Yi Public Library

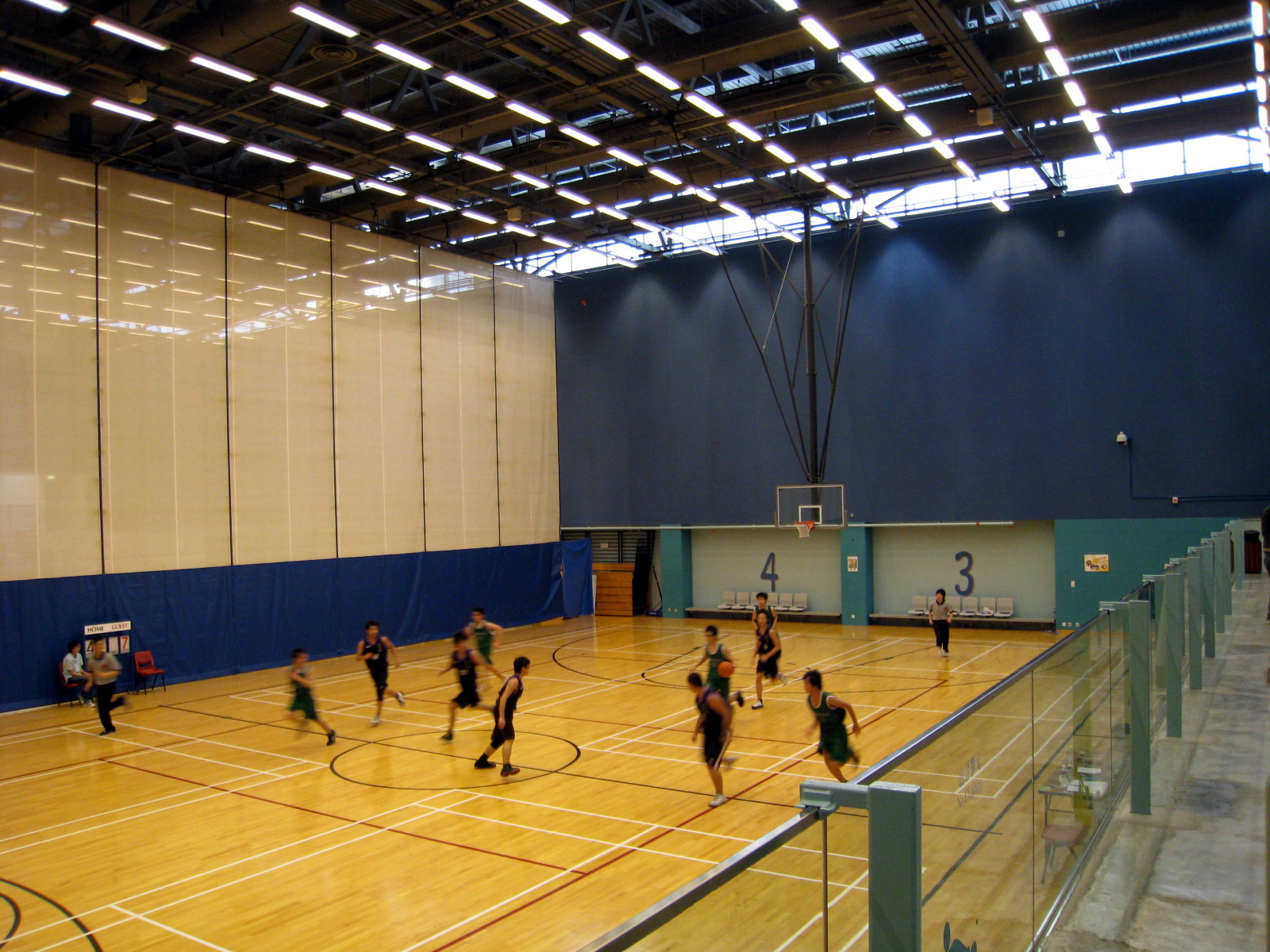
Recreation Centre

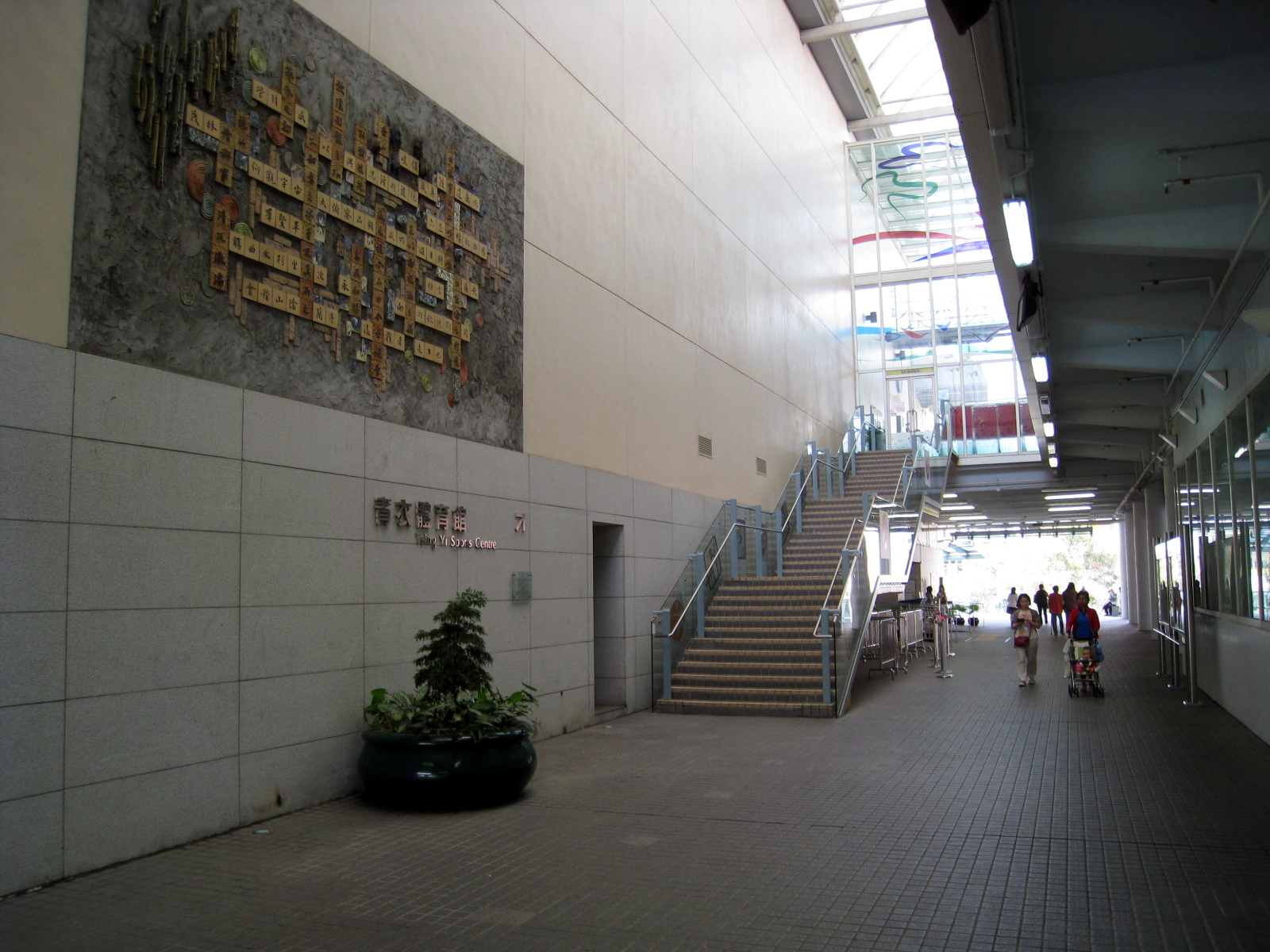
Corridor
