= Yuen Chau Kok Public Library =

Library in Sha Tin, Hong Kong

- 圓洲角公共圖書館
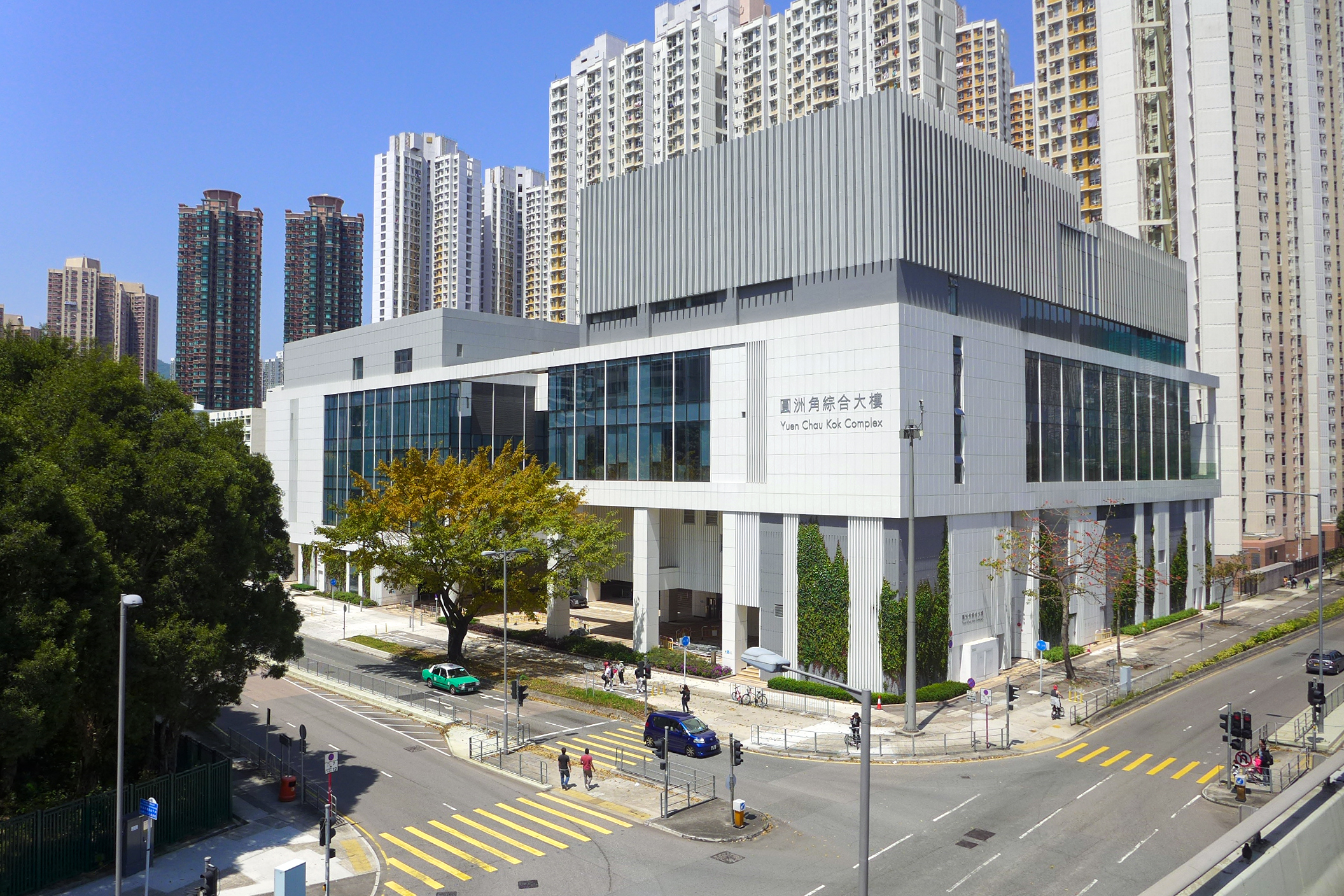
- 22.379244151406727°N 114.20453267194563°E
- Location: 35 Ngan Shing Street, Sha Tin, Hong Kong
- Type: Public
- Established: 30 March 2017

Other information
- Parent organisation: Leisure and Cultural Services Department
- Affiliation: Hong Kong Public Libraries
- Website: Official website

Yuen Chau Kok Public Library
- Traditional Chinese: 圓洲角公共圖書館
Transcriptions
Yue: Cantonese
- Yale Romanization: Yùhn jāu gok gūng guhng tòuh syū gún
- Jyutping: Jyun4 zau1 gok3 gung1 gung6 tou4 syu1 gun2

The Yuen Chau Kok Public Library (Chinese: 圓洲角公共圖書館) is a public library located within the Yuen Chau Kok Complex at 35 Ngan Shing Street, Sha Tin, Hong Kong. It is managed by the Leisure and Cultural Services Department (LCSD) and opened on March 30, 2017.

== Gallery ==
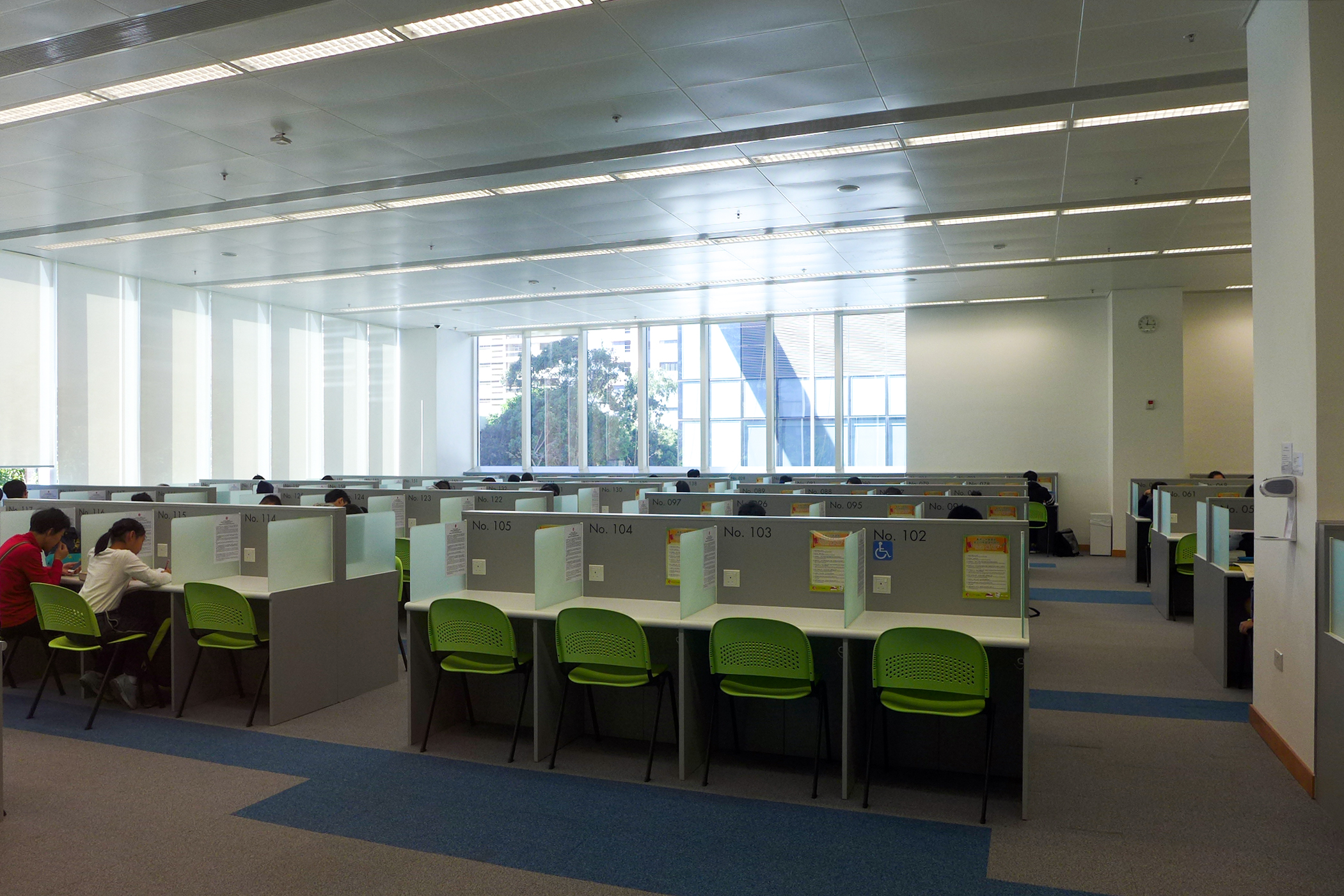
2/F Study Room

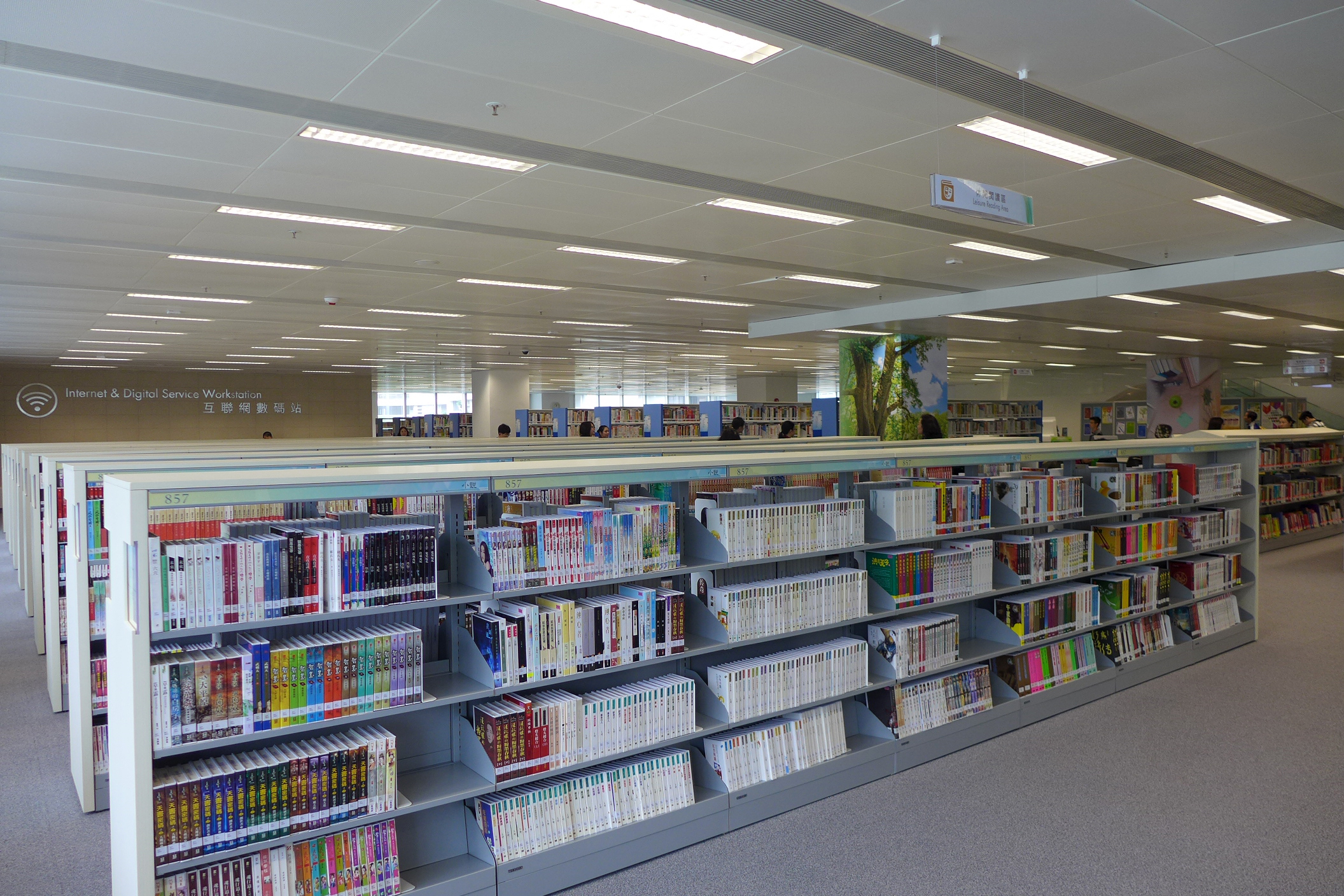
3/F Adult Library

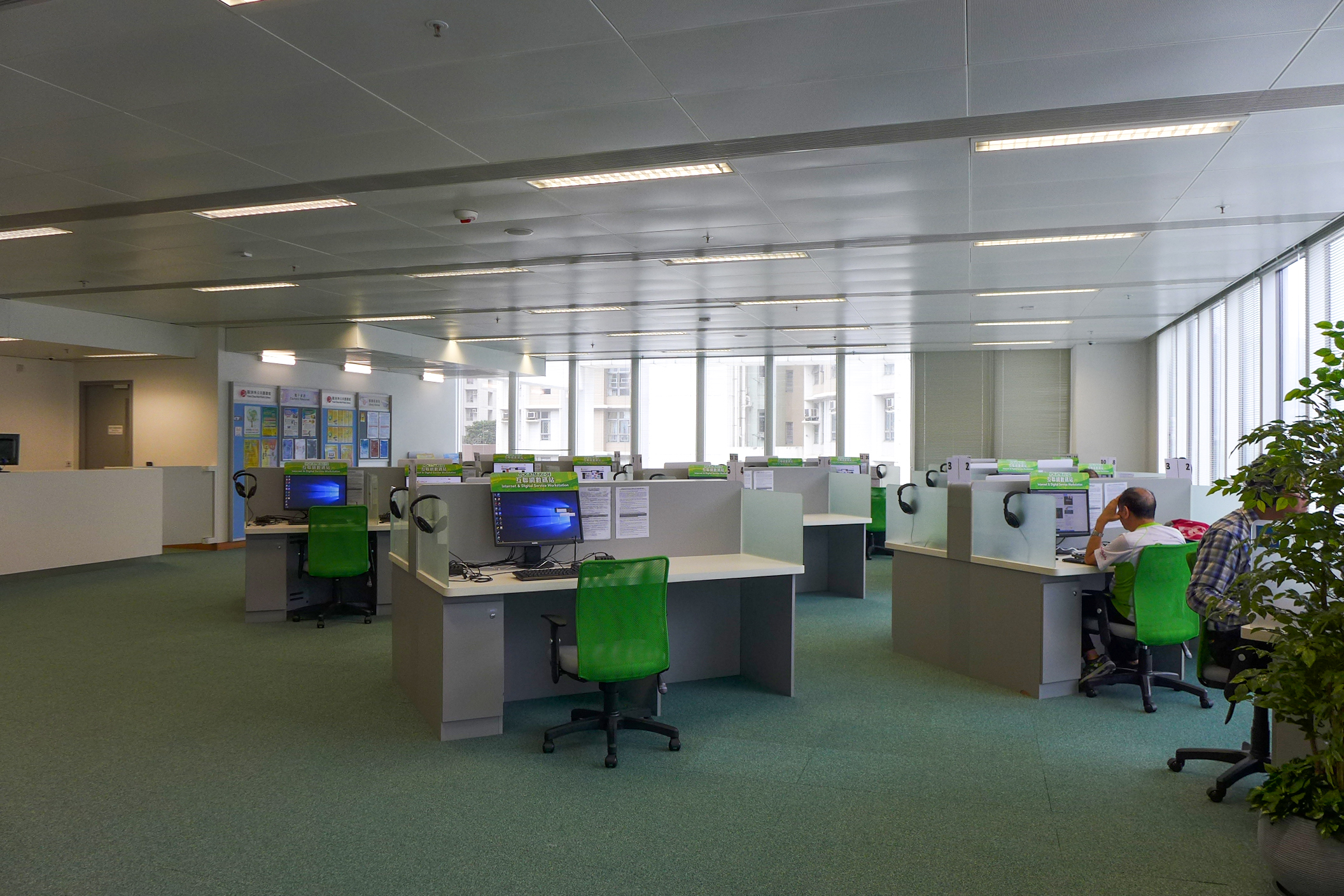
3/F Multimedia Library

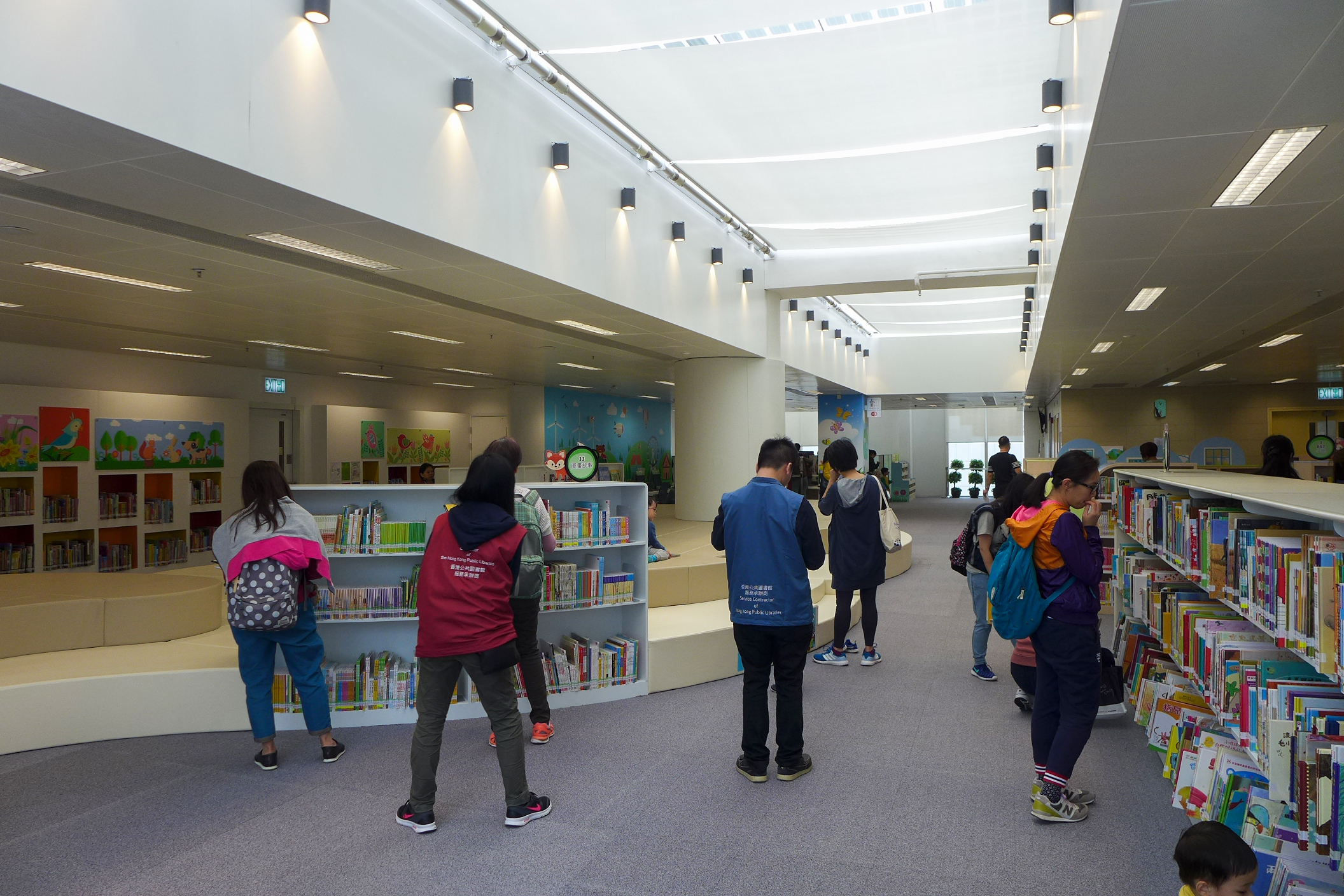
5/F Children's Library
