= Kowloon Public Library =

Public library in Hong Kong

Coordinates: 22.318552°N 114.176091°E

- 九龍公共圖書館
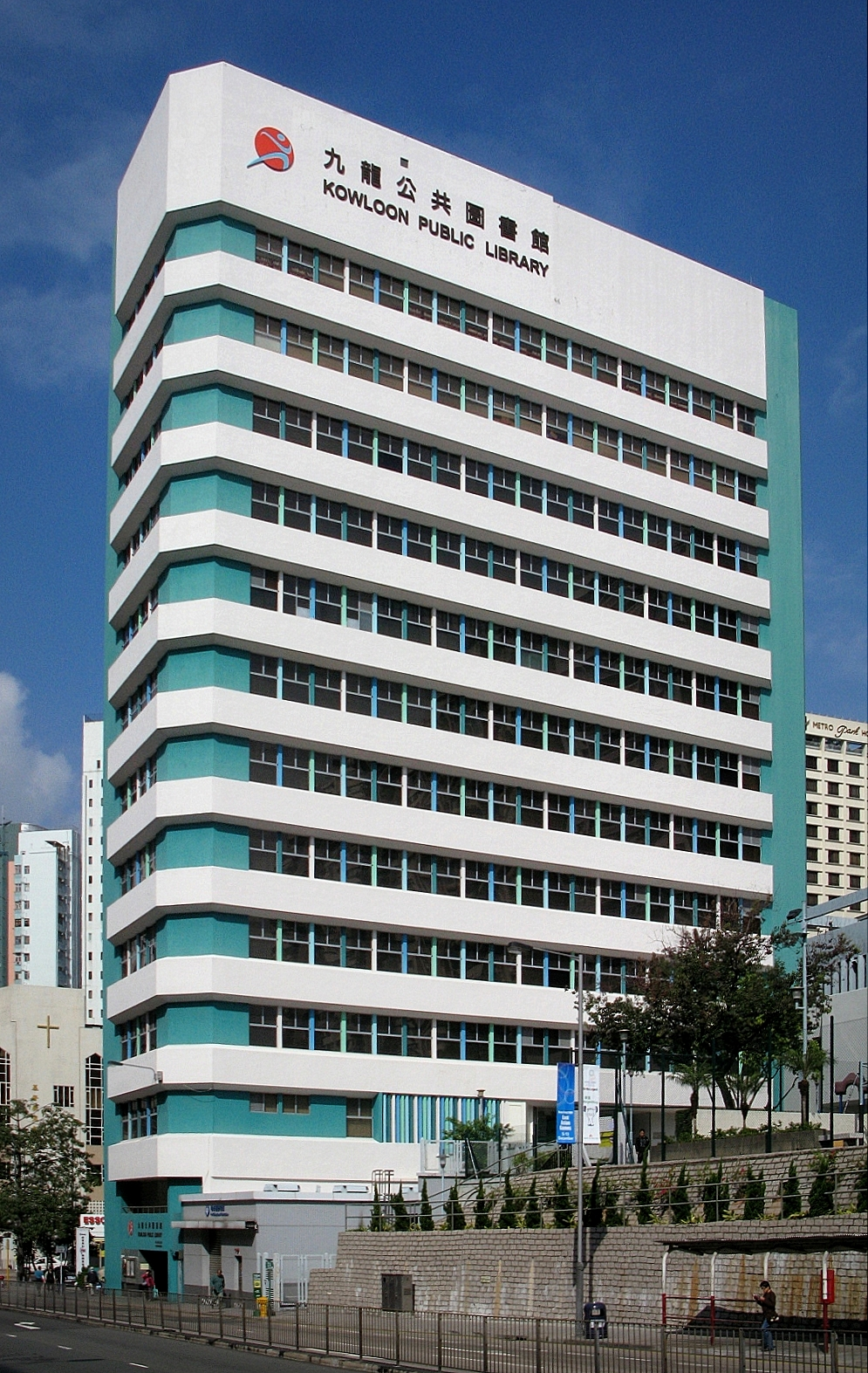
- Location: 5 Pui Ching Road, Ho Man Tin, Hong Kong
- Type: Public
- Established: 1984

Other information
- Parent organisation: Leisure and Cultural Services Department
- Website: Official website

Kowloon Public Library
- Traditional Chinese: 九龍公共圖書館
Transcriptions
Yue: Cantonese
- Yale Romanization: Gáu lùhng jūng yēung tòuh syū gún
- Jyutping: Gau2 lung4 gung1 gung6 tou4 syu1 gun2

The Kowloon Public Library (Chinese: 九龍公共圖書館) is a public library located in Ho Man Tin, Hong Kong. It was previously known as the Kowloon Central Library (Chinese: 九龍中央圖書館). It is managed by the Leisure and Cultural Services Department (LCSD), and is one of the major public libraries in Hong Kong. The 12-storey building comprises about 4,000 square metres (43,000 sq ft) of floor space.

== History ==
The first public library in Kowloon was the Waterloo Road Library, opened 1965. It was replaced when the first phase of the then-Kowloon Central Library opened on 16 November 1984, housed in the first purpose-built library building in the territory. The second phase was opened by Lady Youde, wife of then-Governor Sir Edward Youde, on 9 September 1985. This event is marked by a plaque at the ground level entrance. The building was designed by the Architectural Office (a branch of Public Works Services of the Hong Kong Government since evolved into the Architectural Services Department) with significant contributions by staff architect Pau Shiu-hung. It was originally run under the auspices of the Urban Council Public Libraries before that entity was dissolved into the newly formed LCSD. The library took on its present name in 2000 in anticipation of the opening of the Hong Kong Central Library.

A renovation of the library began in May 2005. The facilities were refurbished, and the Computer and Information Centre was expanded. In January 2007, the exterior of the library was refreshed when the dark brown walls were repainted white and green.

== Facilities ==
The students' study room on the third storey is well-used by students of many schools in the vicinity; namely Pui Ching Middle School, New Method College, Wah Yan College, Yu Chun Keung Memorial College, and others. During the examination period each year (March to May) admission cards are required to enter, while the study room is open to the general public the other nine months of the year.

On 4 May 2007 a 200 square metres (2,200 sq ft) Education Resource Centre opened on the ninth storey providing members of the public and teaching professionals opportunity for continuous learning in education and related fields. It now contains over 40,000 physical and electronic resources covering educational theory, psychology, sociology, civic education, school administration, linguistics, phonology, bilingual education, as well as local and foreign serials, syllabuses and learning assessment data. It also provides information on language learning resources in both Chinese and English, as well as several "language learning booths".

=== Facilities by floor ===
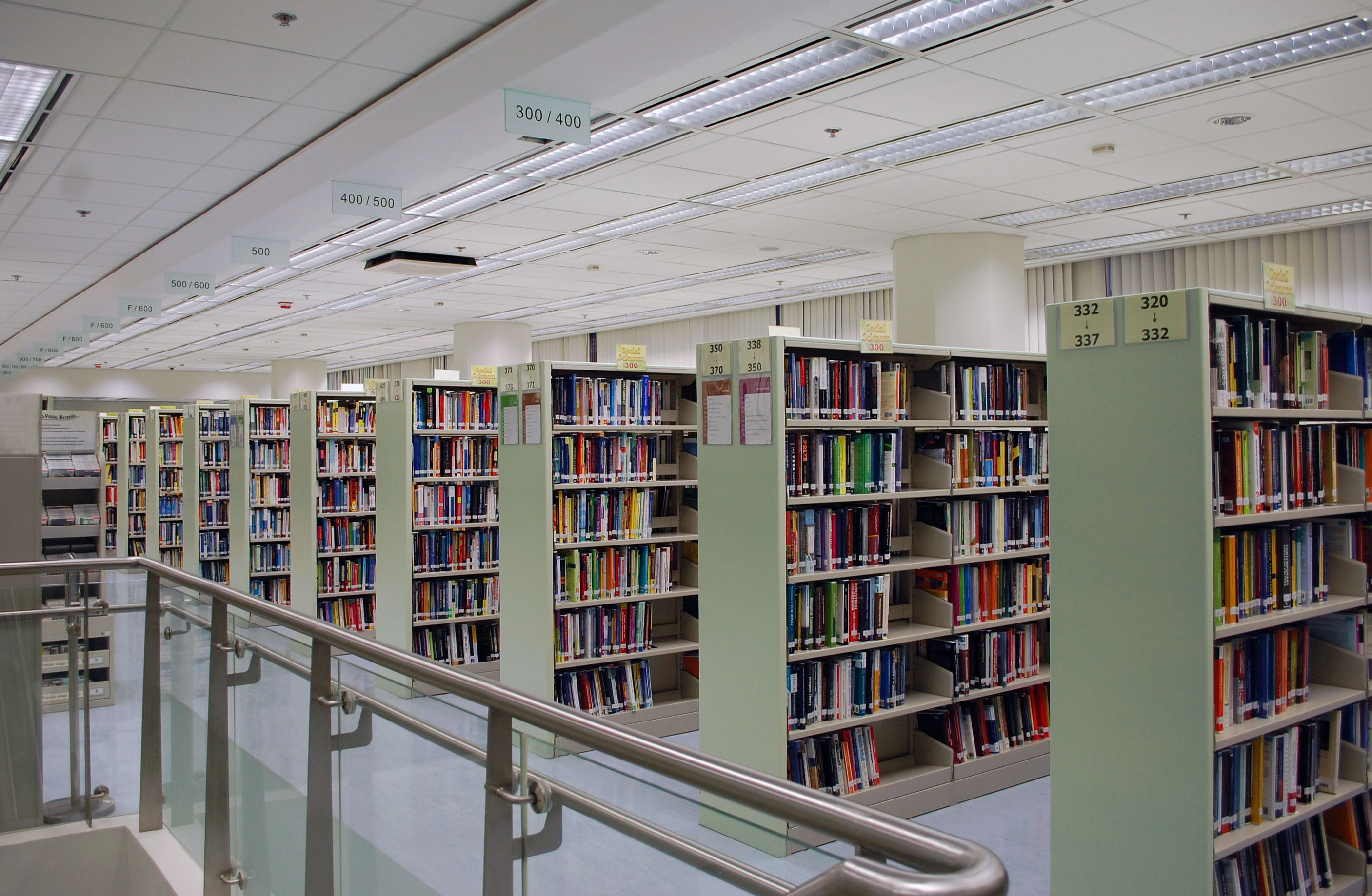
English department

12F	Stacks
11F	Stacks
10F	Reference Library
9F	Reference Library, Education Resource Centre
8F	Computer and Information Centre, extension activities room, multimedia library
7F	Adult Library (English Department)
6F	Adult Library (Chinese Department), female toilets
5F	Newspapers and periodicals, coffee corner, male toilets, children's activities room
4F	Children's Library
3F	Library offices, students' study rooms
2F	Circulation desk, escalator entrance
GF	Ground level entrance, public toilets
