= Run Run Shaw Library =

Academic library in Hong Kong

Run Run Shaw Library 邵逸夫圖書館
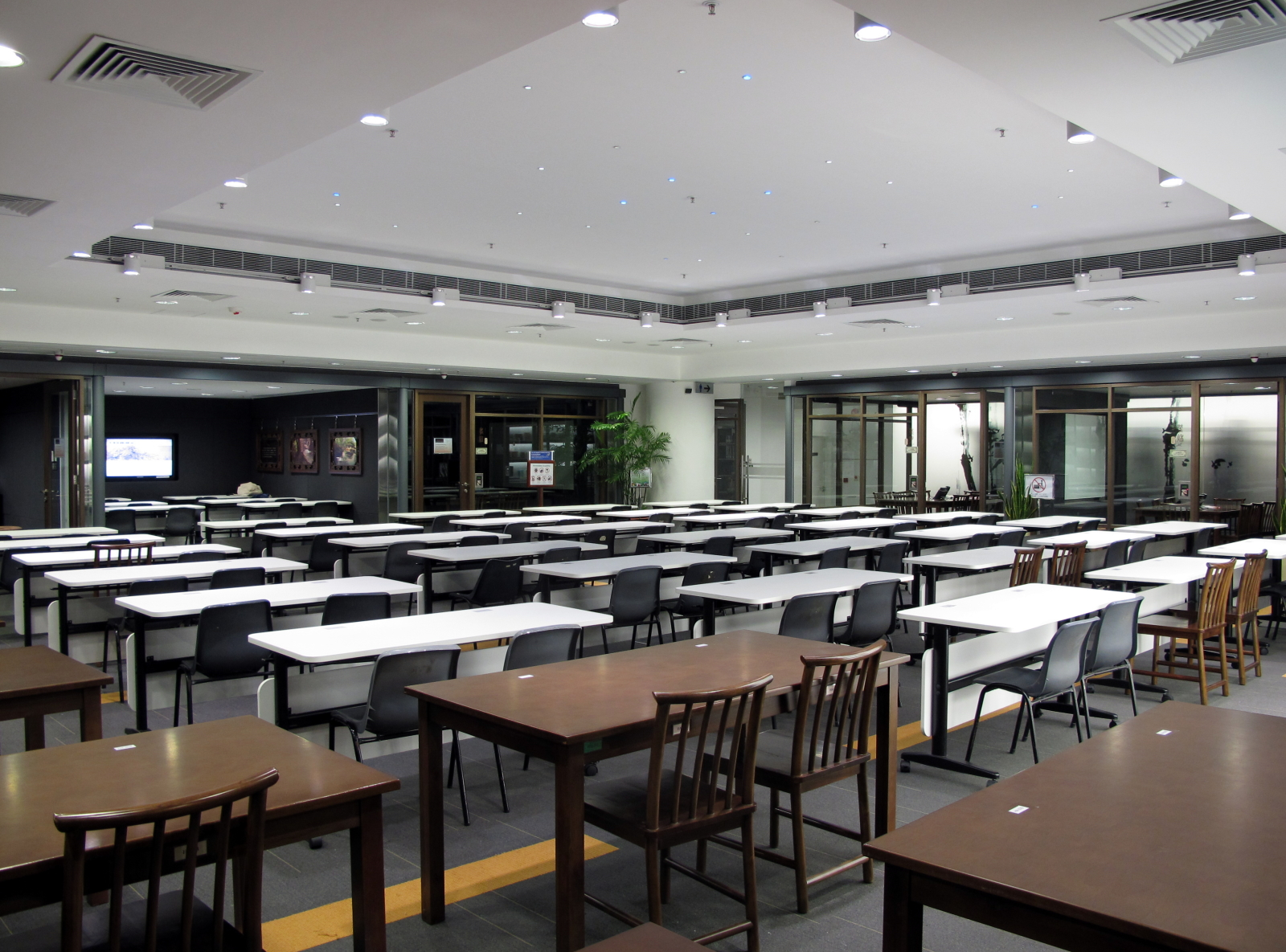
- Inside the Run Run Shaw Library
- Location: 2/F (Red Zone) and 3/F, Yeung Kin Man Academic Building, City University of Hong Kong, Tat Chee Avenue, Kowloon, Hong Kong
- Type: Academic
- Established: 1984; 42 years ago

Collection
- Items collected: Print books, e-books, bound journals

Other information
- Parent organization: City University of Hong Kong
- Website: www.cityu.edu.hk/lib/index.htm

Run Run Shaw Library is the main library of the City University of Hong Kong (CityU). It is located at Tat Chee Avenue, Kowloon, Hong Kong. Founded in 1984, it has developed into an academic library with a collection of 3,250,000 volumes and an annual circulation of 351,032 transactions.

== History ==
The library of the City University of Hong Kong was established in 1984.

In 1989 the CityU library moved to its current location in Kowloon Tong with the university.

In 1990, due to a large donation from Run Run Shaw to City University (then known as the "City Polytechnic of Hong Kong"), the library was renamed the "Run Run Shaw Library".

In 2013, the Run Run Shaw Library was extended. The new wing features 125 individual study spaces, rare book collection facilities, and book storage.

In 2021, Run Run Shaw Library won the American Library Association Presidential Citations for its Lighthouse Heritage Research Connections.

In 2022, The Run Run Shaw Library was awarded the "Chairman's Award for International Library Innovation" by the American Library Association in recognition of its innovative contribution to the "Calligraphy Heritage and Connectivity Project" to revitalize the library's collection of ancient books and documents through the art of calligraphy.

== Current situation ==
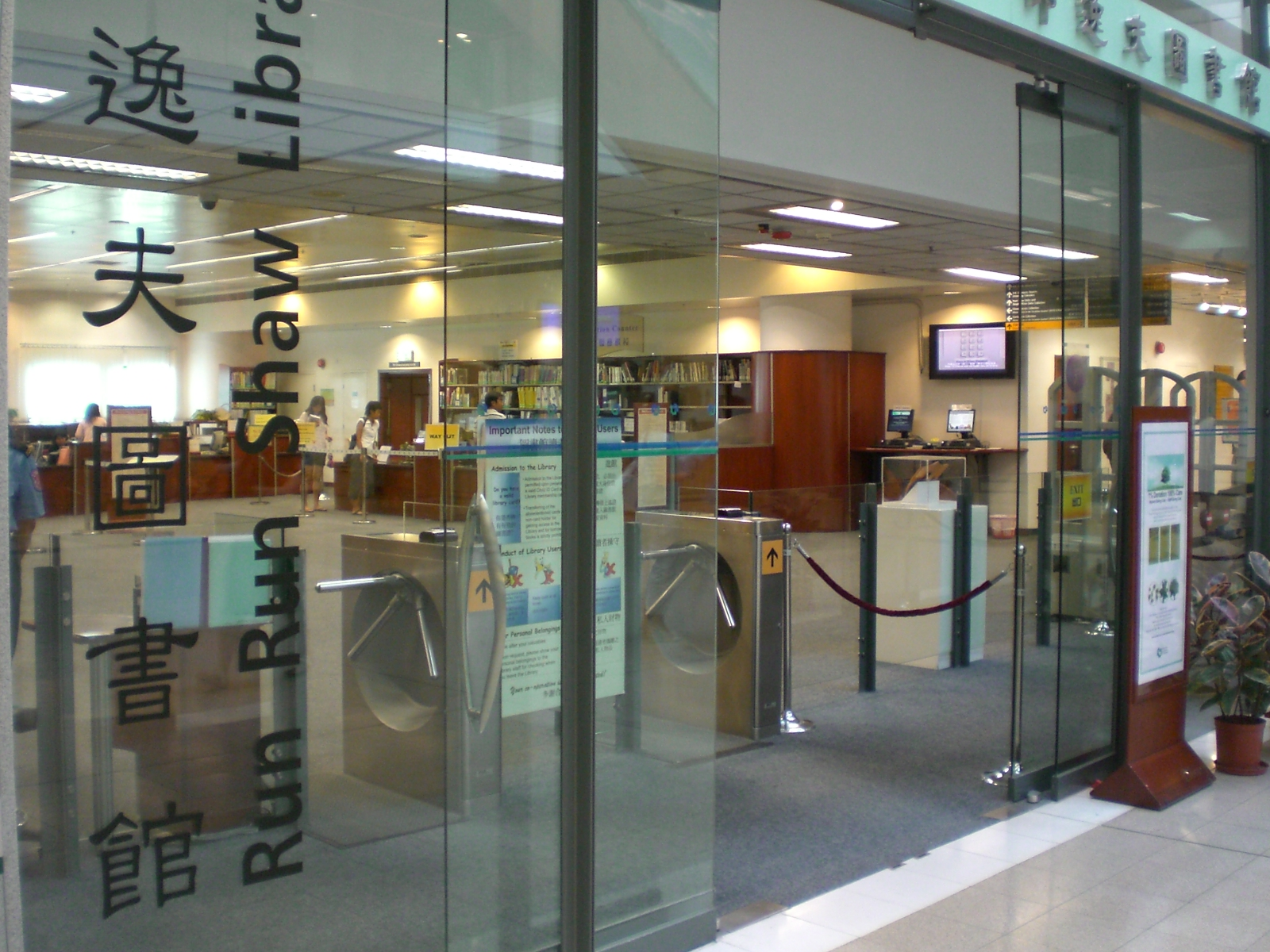
HK CityU Run Run Shaw Library

The CityU library is located on the second and third levels of Yeung Kin Man Academic Building at a central area of the campus. There are around 2,700 seats available.

The library has a collection of about 1,038,800 print books, 2,220,600 electronic books, 178,800 volumes of bound periodicals and 965 current serials titles. And there are electronic databases, e-journals, and other e-resources. The library has an annual circulation of 351,032 items, serving a population of 25,310 students and staff of the University.
