= Hong Kong Central Library =

Largest library in Hong Kong

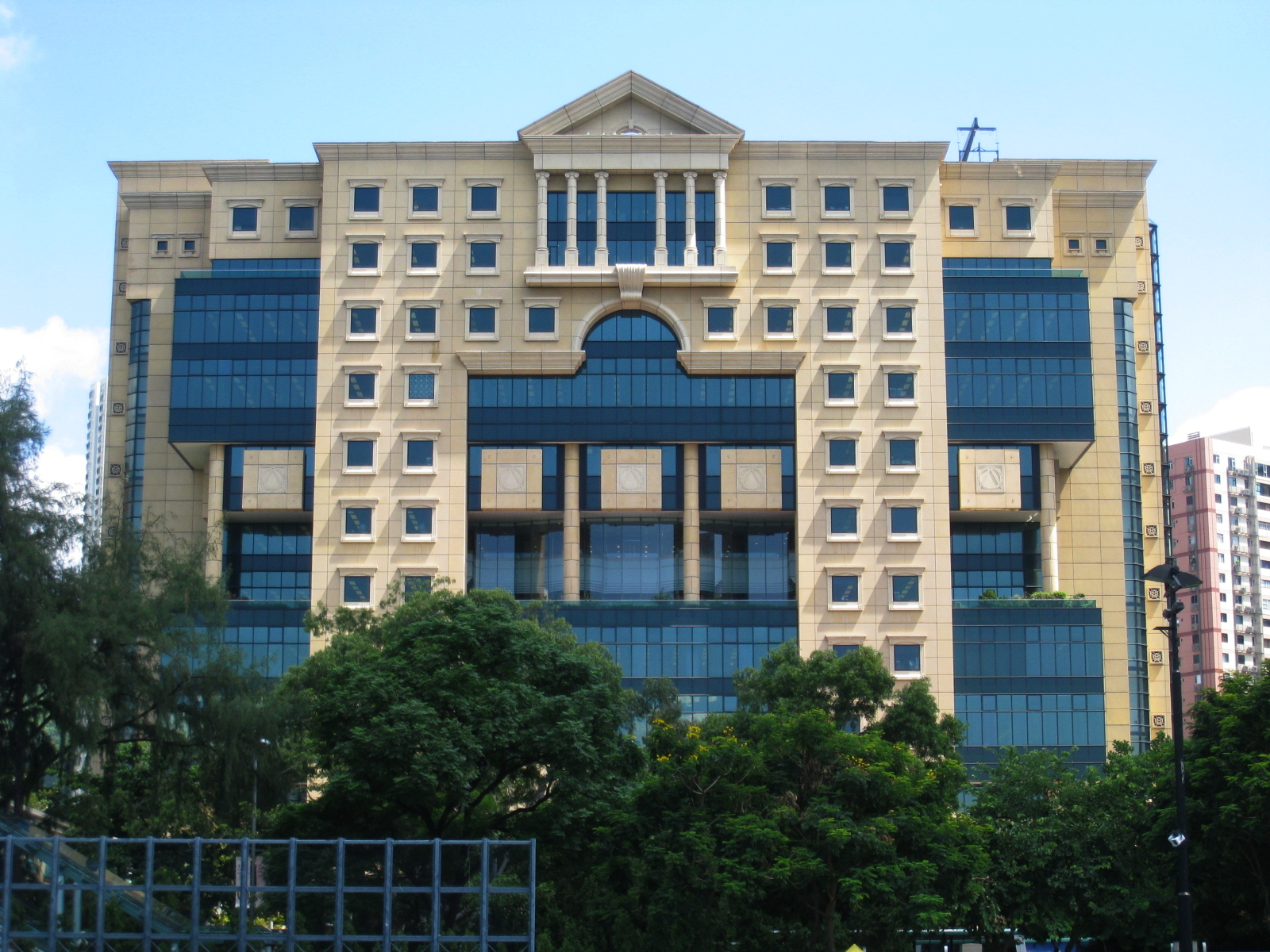
- Hong Kong Central Library front view
- 22°16′47.87″N 114°11′22.30″E.
- Location: 66 Causeway Road, Causeway Bay, Hong Kong
- Type: Public library
- Established: 17 May 2001; 25 years ago

Collection
- Items collected: Books, newspapers, periodicals, maps, music scores, audiovisual materials, electronic resources, microforms, and other print and non-print materials
- Size: 2,300,000 items

Other information
- Website: hkpl.gov.hk

Hong Kong Central Library
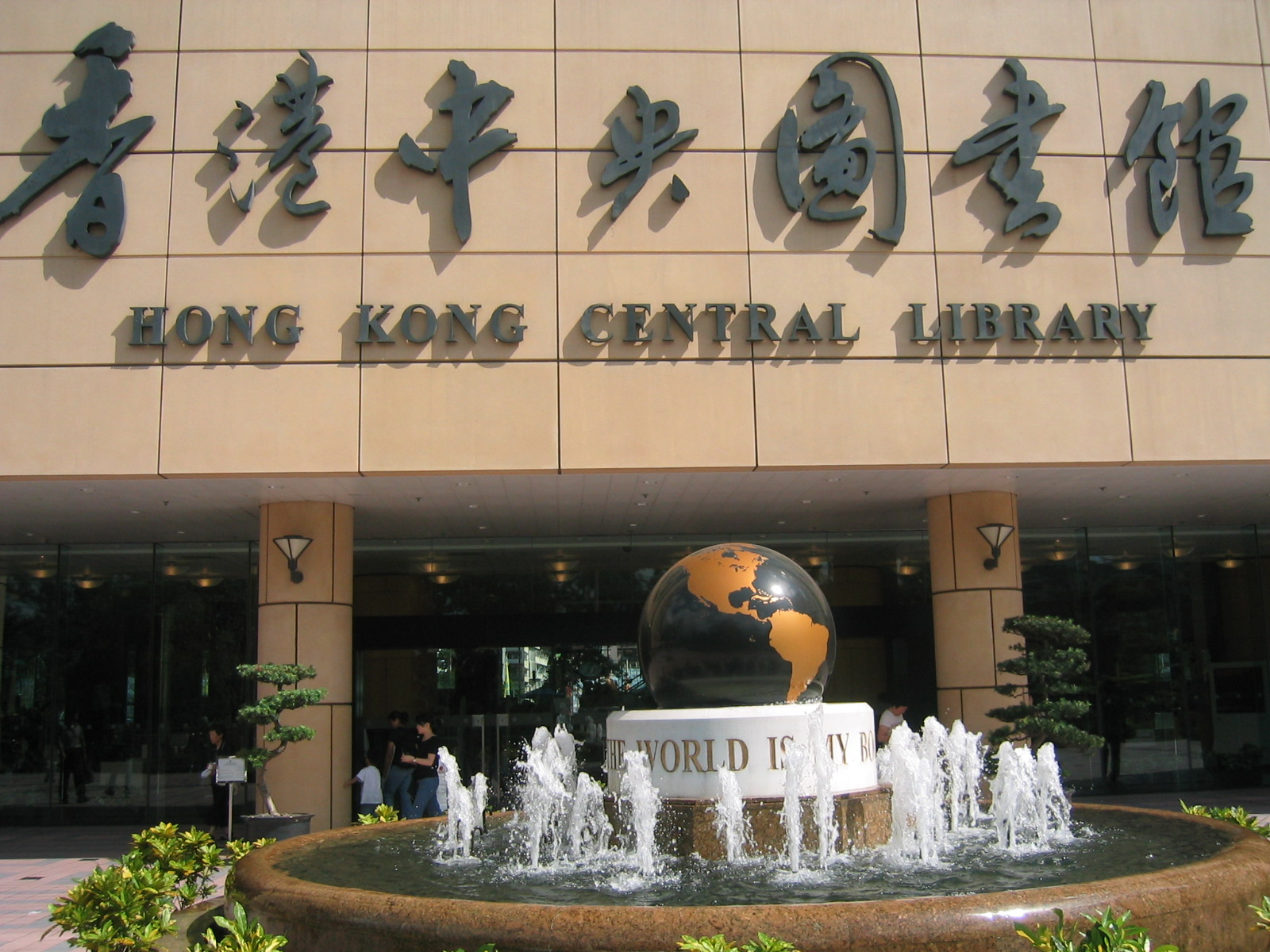
- Entrance to the library. A fountain with a spinning top can be seen outside it.
- Traditional Chinese: 香港中央圖書館
- Simplified Chinese: 香港中央图书馆
Transcriptions
Standard Mandarin
- Hanyu Pinyin: Xiānggǎng Zhōngyāng Túshūguǎn
Yue: Cantonese
- Yale Romanization: Hēunggóng Jūngyēung Tòuhsyūgún
- Jyutping: Hoeng^{1}gong^{2} zung^{1}joeng^{1} tou^{4}syu^{1}gun^{2}

Hong Kong Central Library is the largest library in Hong Kong, flagship library of Hong Kong Public Libraries (HKPL) and used as Hong Kong Public Library headquarters, functioning as the territory's National Library. It is located at the intersection of Moreton Terrace and Causeway Road in Causeway Bay.

Facing Victoria Harbour, the 12-storey high building occupies a gross area of 9,400 square metres (101,000 sq ft) with a floor area of 33,800 square metres (364,000 sq ft). The building cost of the Central Library was HK$690 million ($88 million). The Library's collections amount to one fifth of the Hong Kong Public Libraries System; 2.3 million items out of the total 12.1 million items.

The library's 11th floor houses the HKPL head office. The arch-shaped doorway atop the front facade of the Hong Kong Central Library symbolises the Gate to Knowledge, while the triangle, square and circle which make up the arch all carry further meaning. The circle represents the sky, the square the land and the triangle the accretion of knowledge. When it was originally proposed, the design was controversial and received critiques from Urban Council members.

Additionally, the library has an intelligent building design. Power and data lines reach every corner of the building, laying the necessary foundation for digital service.

== Services ==
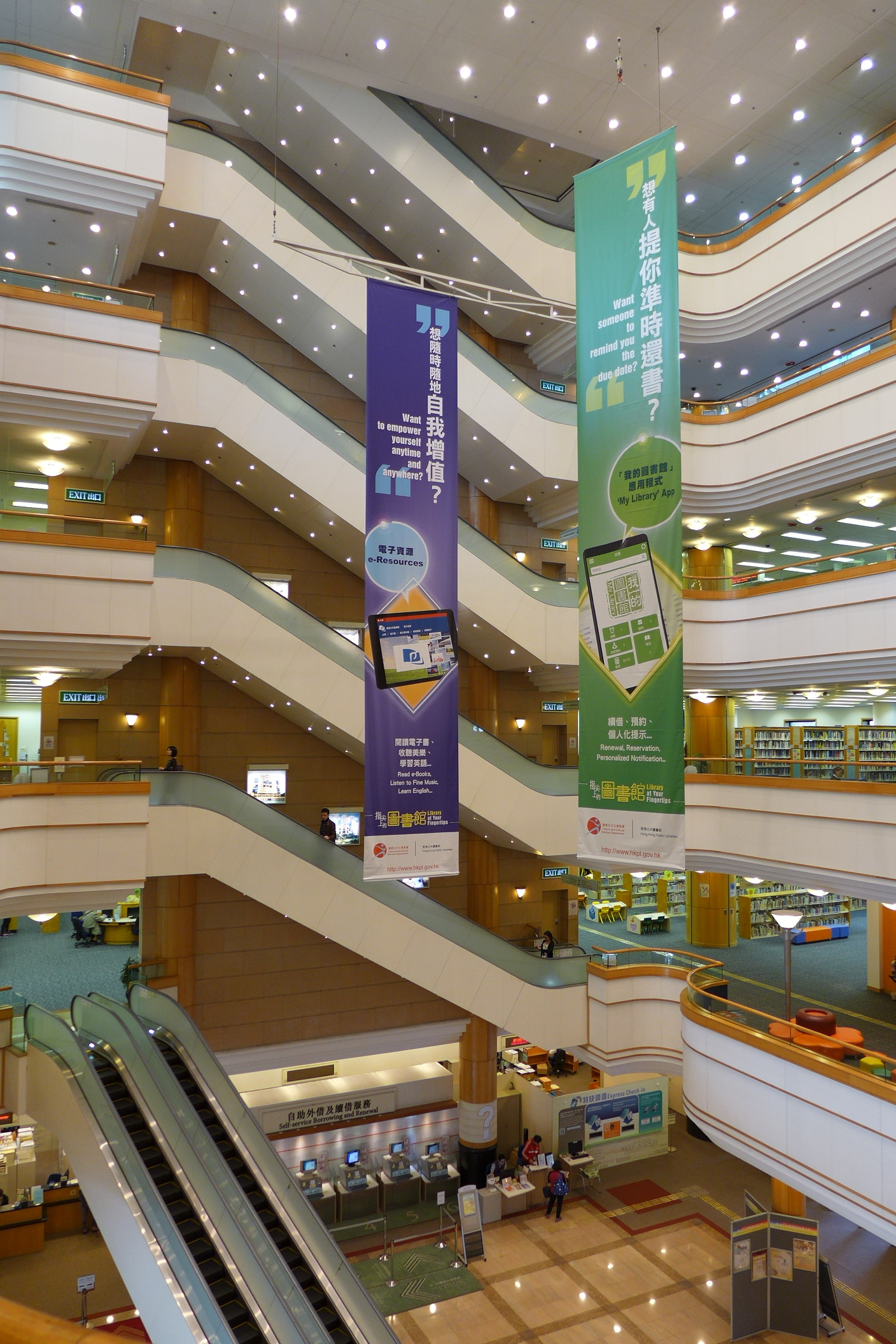
Atrium of the library

Opened on 17 May 2001, the Hong Kong Central Library provides a complete variety of library services including:

- inclusive reference and information services
- self-charging terminals
- Bookdrop service (available during library non-opening hours)
- information kiosks
- Multimedia Information System (MMIS).

=== Online Public Access Catalogue ===
The Online Public Access Catalogue (OPAC) enables readers to rummage around the whole Chinese and English collections of the Hong Kong Public Libraries. Over and above a wide assortment of search options, such as author, title, subject, etc.

Readers do not have the choice at the start to narrow their search to books only, to audio-visual materials only or to some other categories or materials.

From any OPAC terminal, readers will know instantaneously whether the item they need is available on the shelf, on loan or being reserved. If it is on loan, readers will also know the date the item is due for return.

In case readers wish to know library related activities that are being held or forthcoming; or wish to check their own borrowing record, like how many books readers have borrowed, which item is overdue, etc., merely follow the menu options and readers will find them all. Readers may also carry out renewal and reservation at any OPAC terminal.

=== Multimedia Information System (MMIS) ===
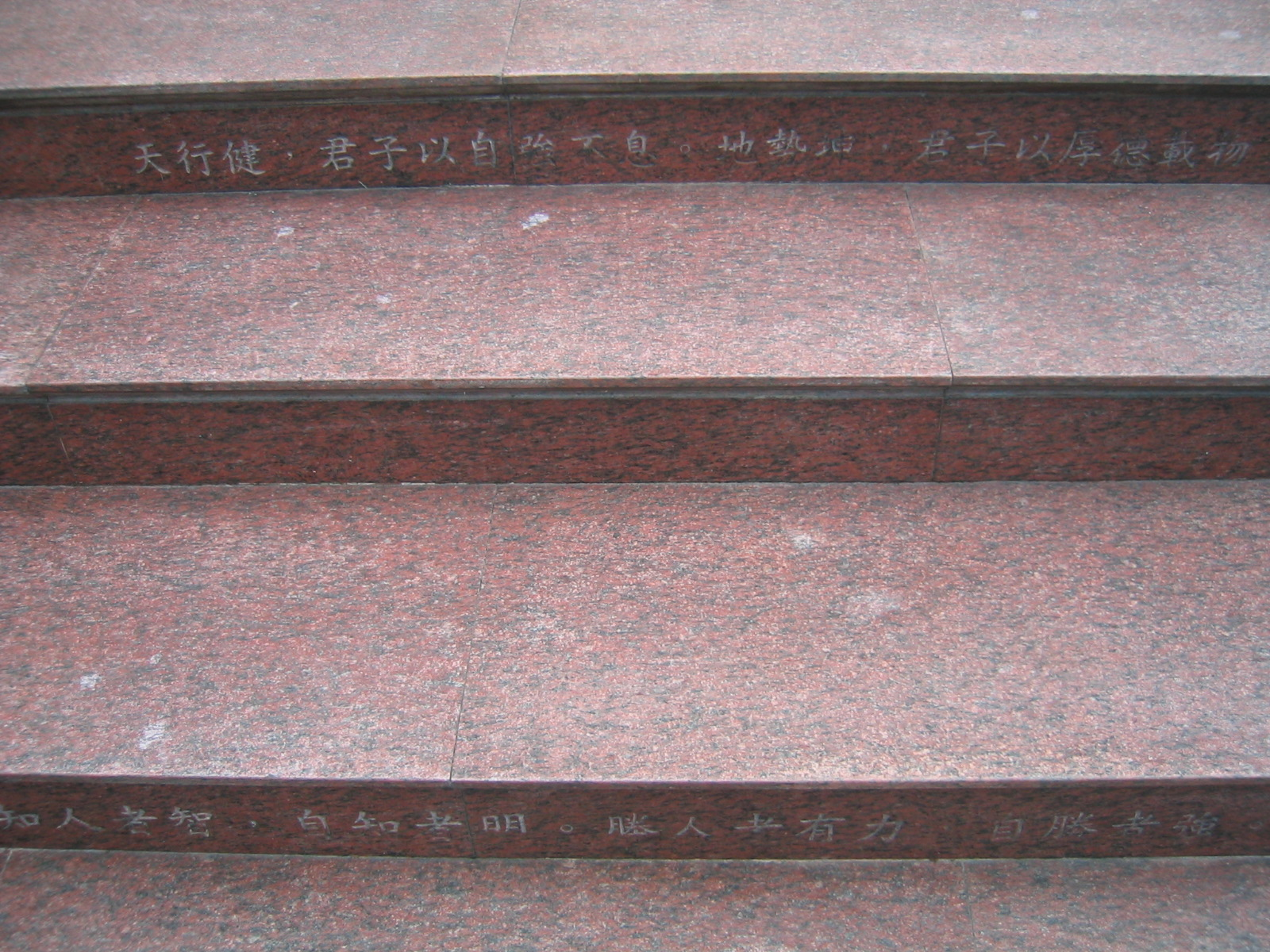
Steps leading to the library. Quotations from Chinese classics (as can be seen here), and English proverbs, are carved on them.

Multimedia Information System is an example of all-embracing use of information technology and computer application in the Hong Kong Central Library. A three level audio-on-demand (AOD) and video-on-demand (VOD) system has been set up:

- 1st level: built upon the high quality video-audio servers. Users can access the system in sync.
- 2nd level: consists of servers and jukeboxes. It is a more economical channel for the public to search for less frequently used audio/video materials.
- 3rd level: a conventional video/audio distribution network is used. Users can access media of most formats using LD, VCD, DVD, CD player and cassette player.

To enable more public to use the first level video and third level audio and video of the AOD/VOD system, about 90 Asynchronous Transfer Mode (ATM) terminals are installed in the Hong Kong Central Library. Meanwhile, the public can also use the AOD system by using the over 400 LAN workstations in the Central Library.

In addition, the Hong Kong Central Library provides document imaging materials, such as drawings, manuscripts, microfilms, clippings, reports, posters, house programmes, newspapers, photos, maps, pictures, black-and-white document images etc. After clearance of the relevant copyright/licensing terms, the materials are digitised and stored in the multimedia databases for all set access of users.

Comparing with the traditional library services, the digital library can provide better services in the way that:

- user can search information once there are networked workstations;
- multiple users can search for and use the same library materials concurrently;
- research and accessing information becomes more effective, efficient and in-depth;
- research means are of a greater variety, such as searching by colour format, style and structure, etc.

The Multimedia Information Services have already been extended to other public libraries. Depending on user demand, the Hong Kong Central Library may also make more workstations available for use.

=== Legal Deposit Library ===
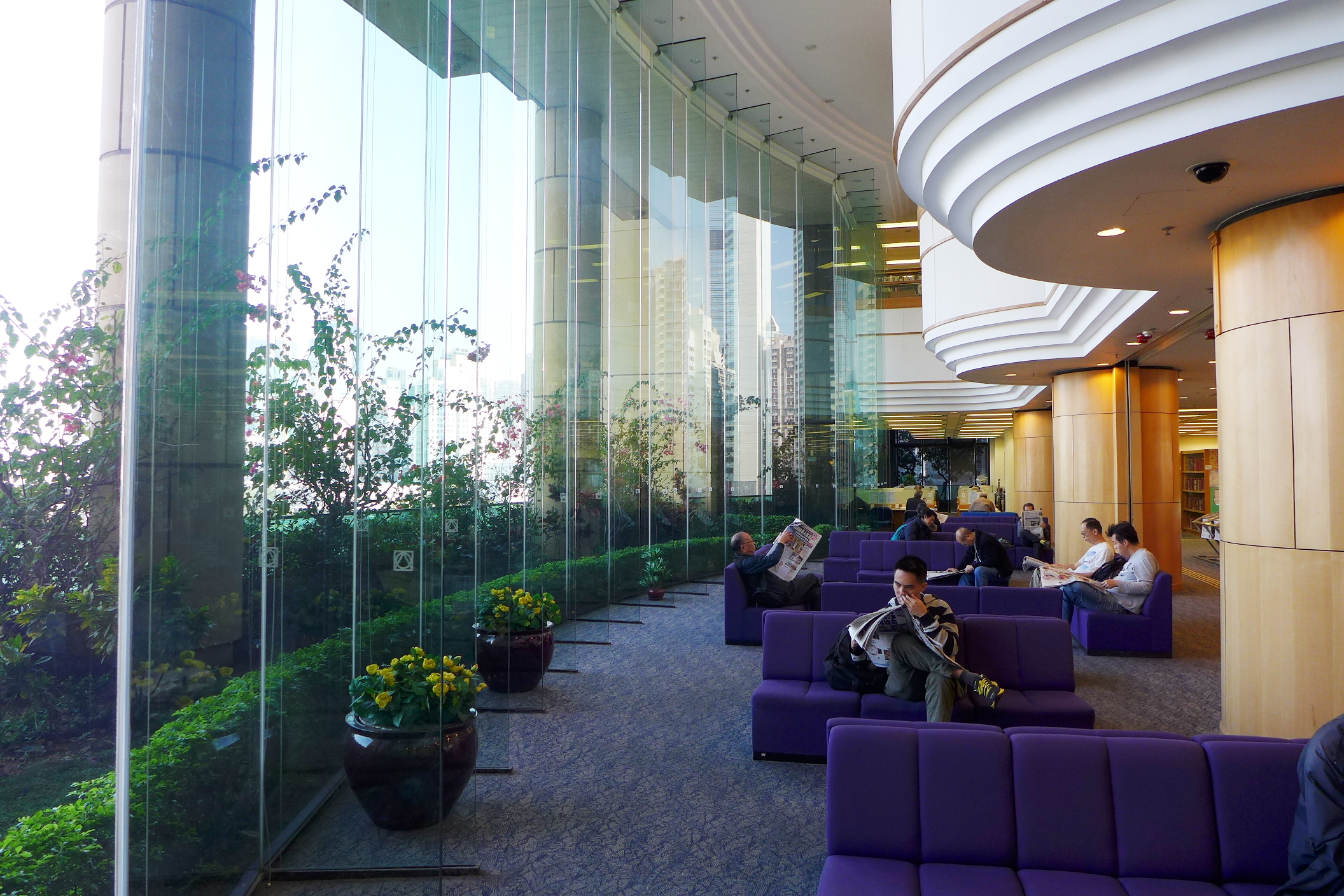
Level 5 Reading Area

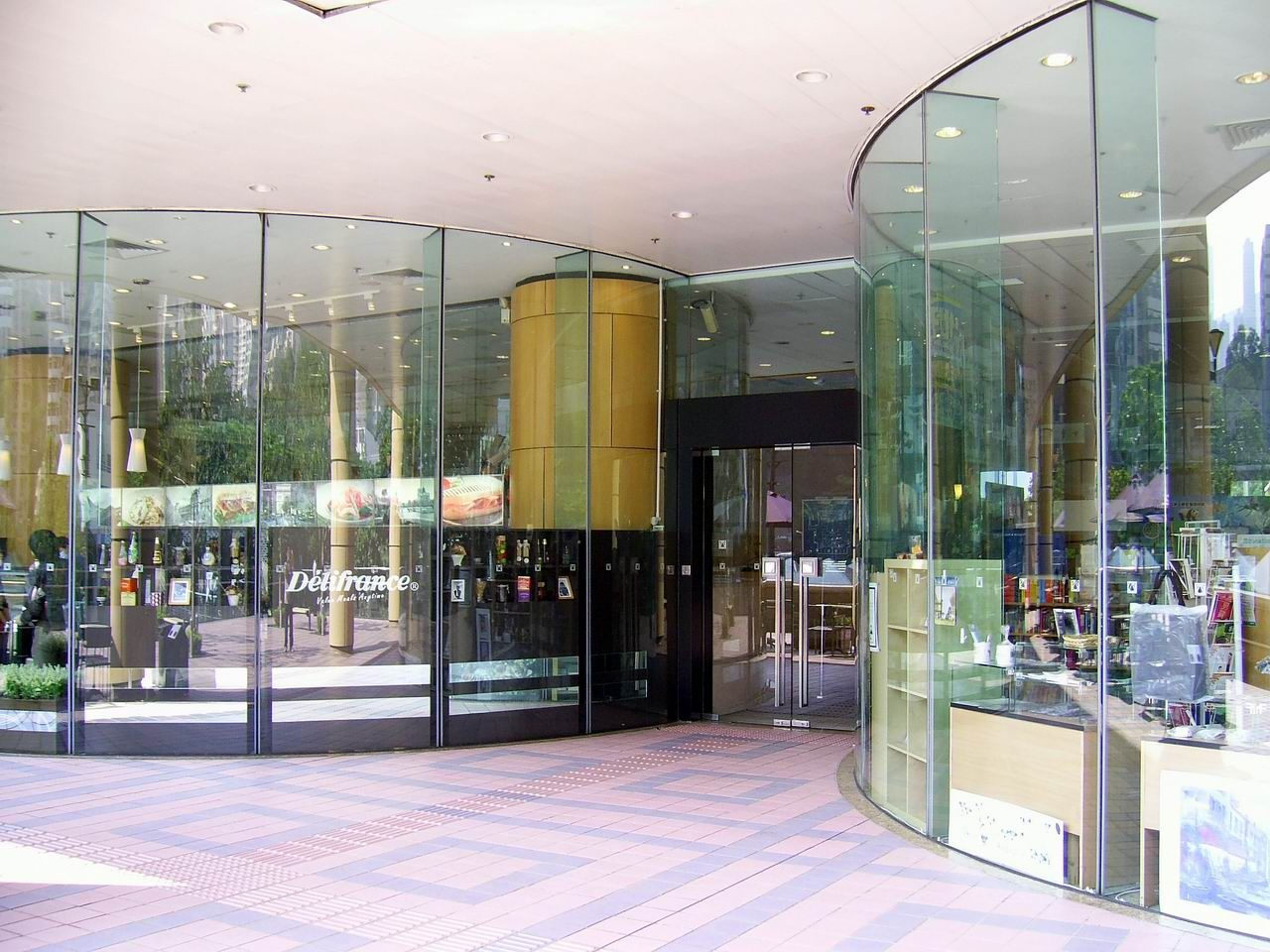
Délifrance café.

The Hong Kong Central Library is an intelligent building, built on a network flooring system to offer litheness for the supply of power, telecommunication and further alteration and extension. Hong Kong Central Library has been designated as the legal depository library in Hong Kong for nine global organisations:

- Asian Development Bank
- European Union
- International Labour Organization
- International Maritime Organization
- United Nations
- United Nations Educational, Scientific and Cultural Organization
- World Bank
- World Trade Organization
- World Food Programme

Materials published by these organisations will have copies sent to this library. These materials are accessible to the public via a variety of methods.

Reading tables are all provided with separate power points and dataline outlets through which library patrons can use their own portable computers to access the library network and the Internet. Readers can also retrieve a wide range of multimedia databases on CD-ROMs and the Internet through the LAN/ATM workstations.

=== Special Collections ===
The 11 special collections being housed in the Hong Kong Central Library are manly related to Hong Kong and include:

- The Hong Kong Collection
- Hong Kong Oral History Collection
- Open University of Hong Kong Course Materials Collection
- Hong Kong Music Collection
- Hok Hoi Collection
- Kotewall Collection
- Hong Kong Exchanges Collection
- The Royal Asiatic Society (Hong Kong Branch) Collection
- Hong Kong Literature Collection
- Hong Kong Village Life Collection
- Documents Collection Campaign Collection

=== Discussion Rooms ===
Several floors of the Hong Kong Central Library have discussion rooms available for rental at a fixed charge on an hourly basis, and on a 30-minute basis thereafter.

=== Café ===
The library houses a Délifrance café outside the library area on the first floor behind the bookshop. There are both indoor and outdoor seats for it.

== Art installments ==
To help create an artistic environment for the library, three submissions to the Competition on Design of Decorative Works of Art for the Hong Kong Central Library were selected and place around the library. Those installments include:

- Sprout
- The Fountain of Wisdom
- Enlightenment

== Fences ==
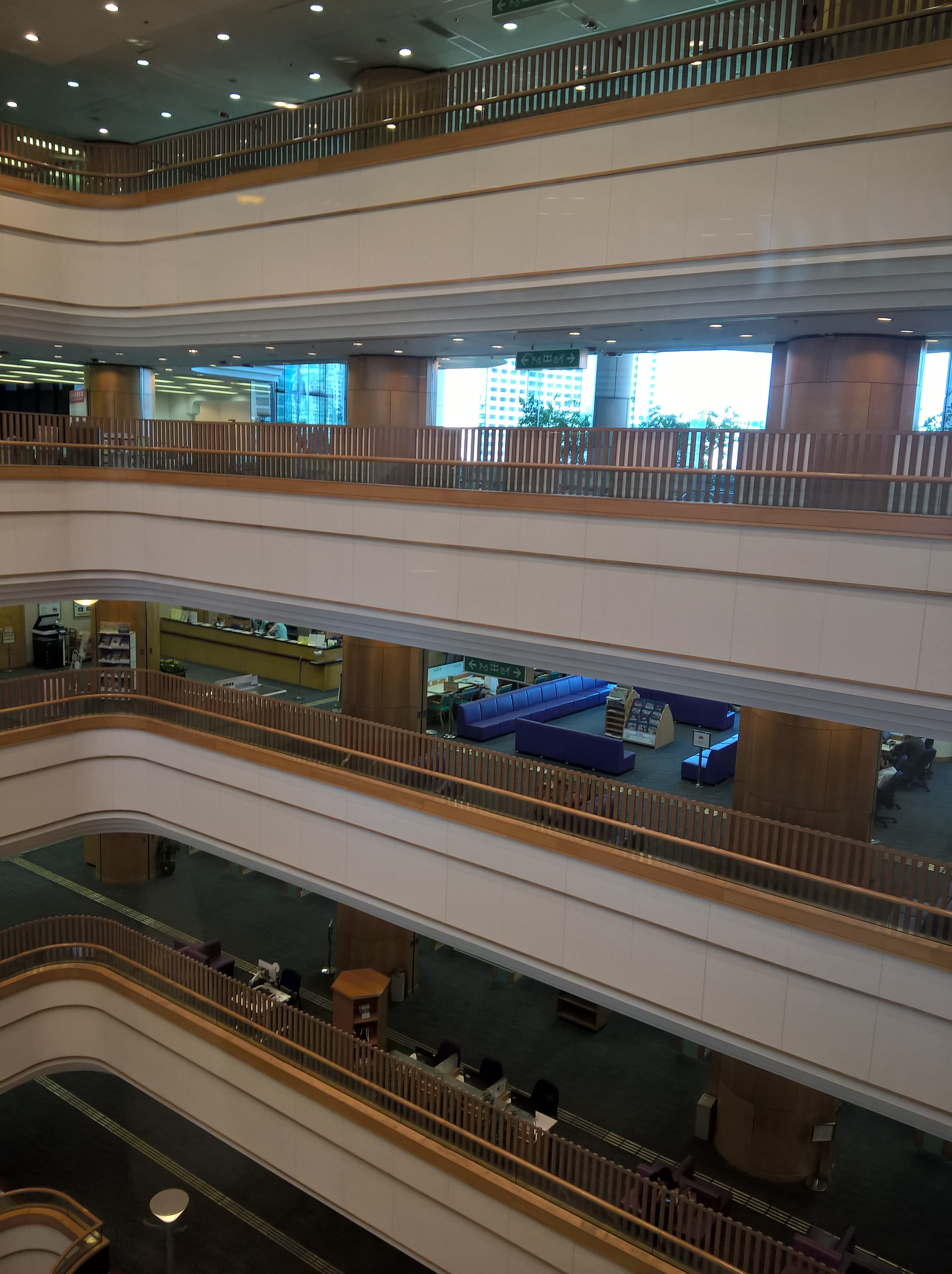
Tall fences on third to sixth floors of Hong Kong Central Library.

After three cases of jumping to death in the library, tall fences were installed along some railings around the corners on fifth and sixth floors in 2015 to prevent future suicides. Yet there was another suicide in the library in 2016. Fences have now been installed from the third to sixth floors.

== Design controversy ==
The library was designed by government senior architect Ho Chiu-fan. When the design was submitted to the Town Planning Board in 1995, its members were disappointed, especially by its exterior look. After Elaine Chung Lai-kwok became the Director of Urban Services Department in February 1997, she heard strong criticisms against the design from urban councillors and the cultural community, so she asked the Director of Architectural Services Department Pau Shiu-hung for new designs, and Pau invited four prominent Hong Kong private architects to the task. A row broke out in July 1997 when Ronald Leung Ding-bong, chairman of the Provisional Urban Council, openly scolded Chung for acting without his approval. Kam Nai-wai, chairman of the Libraries Select Committee of the council, also criticised Chung for breaching procedures and opposing the council's decisions. On 8 August 1997, the Provisional Urban Council decided to vote between the design by Rocco Yim Sen-kee and the original design, which resulted in a tie with 21 votes each, then Leung, the council's chairman, made the final decision by casting his second vote for the original design, even though Yim's design was praised by architects as much superior to the original.

== Anecdote ==
There existed some memorial plaques dedicated to famous modern Chinese writers in the library, one of them was for the witty and erudite scholar-novelist Qian Zhongshu (錢鍾書). When the library was first opened, it was found that the second character in Qian's name, zhong (鍾, "to favour"), was mis-represented as zhong (鐘, "clock"). The mistake drew some criticism against the new library, which contains the greatest number of reference books among the public libraries in Hong Kong.

== See also ==
- Hong Kong Public Libraries
- List of libraries in Hong Kong
