= Hong Kong Public Libraries =

System of public libraries in Hong Kong

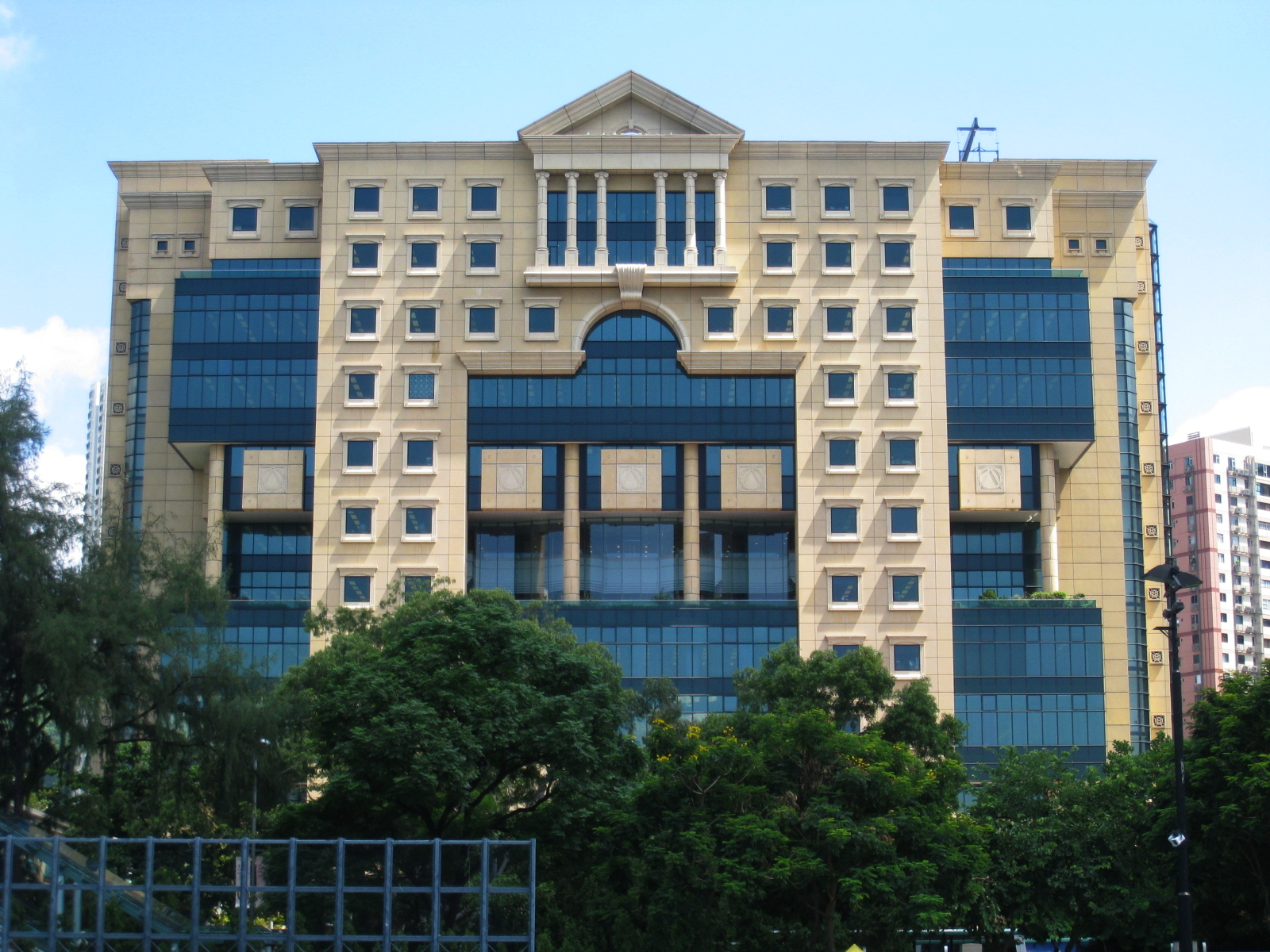
- Hong Kong Central Library, the location of the head office
- Established: 1962
- Branches: 71 static, 12 mobile

Collection
- Size: 11.36 million books and 1.74 million multimedia materials

Access and use
- Circulation: 60.0 million
- Population served: 7,184,000
- Members: 4.1 million borrowers

Other information
- Budget: 776.2 million HKD
- Director: Lee Yuk-man, Leisure and Culture Services Assistant Director (Libraries and Development)
- Website: Official website

Hong Kong Public Libraries
- Traditional Chinese: 香港公共圖書館
- Simplified Chinese: 香港公共图书馆
Transcriptions
Standard Mandarin
- Hanyu Pinyin: Xiānggǎng Gōnggòng Túshūguǎn
Yue: Cantonese
- Jyutping: hoeng1 gong2 gung1 gung6 tou4 syu1 gun2

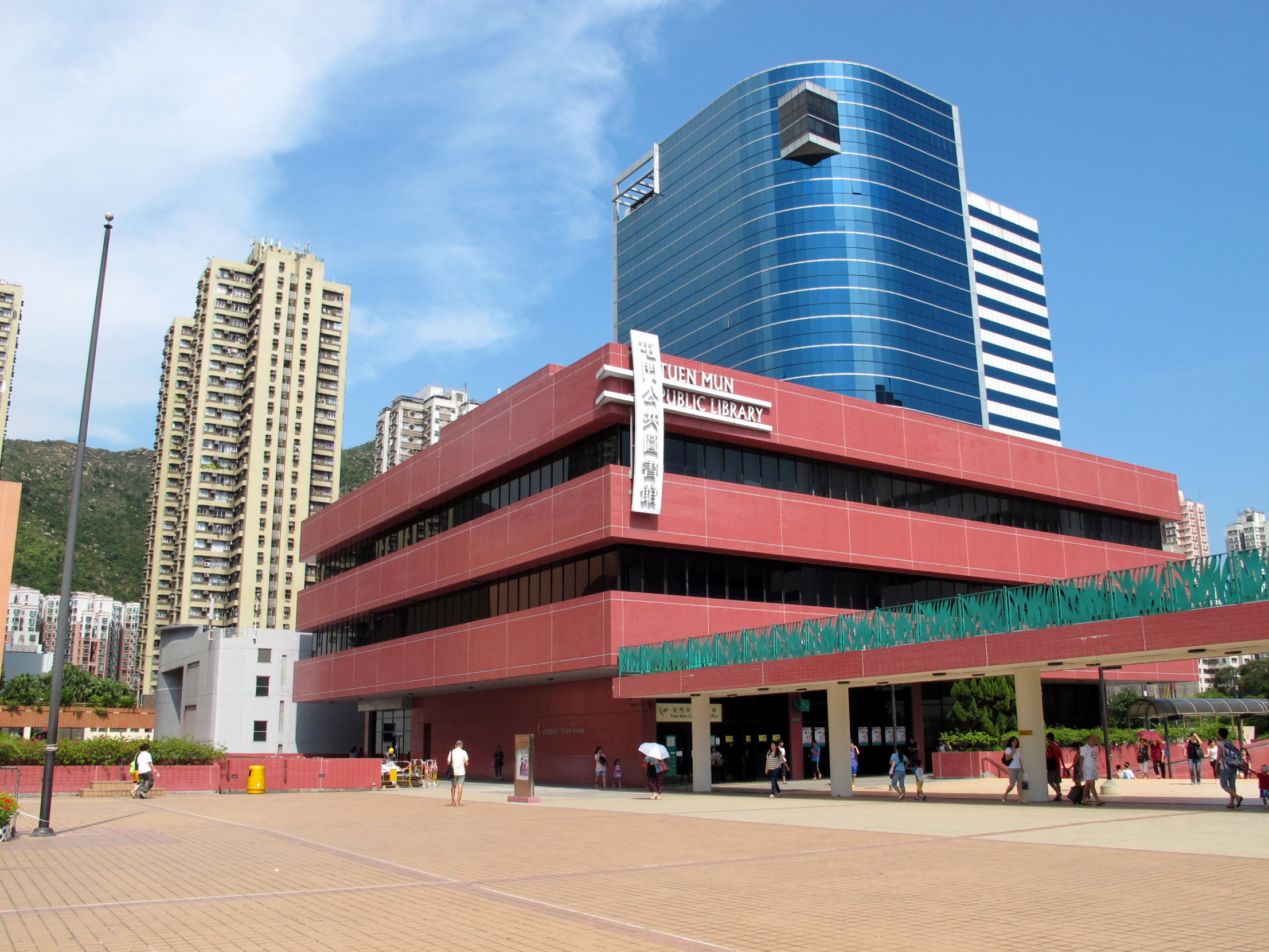
Tuen Mun Public Library

The Hong Kong Public Libraries (HKPL; Chinese: 香港公共圖書館) is a system of 70 static and 12 mobile public libraries in Hong Kong. Offering a total collection of 14.35 million items, the system is managed by the Leisure and Cultural Services Department. The network of libraries are interconnected by a computerised library management system, one of the largest bilingual systems in the world, offering both Chinese and English capabilities.

The library head office is located on the eleventh floor of the Hong Kong Central Library in Causeway Bay.

== History ==
The first public library of Hong Kong, the City Hall Library, was established in 1869 in the former Hong Kong City Hall. The library ceased to operate after the demolition of the old city hall in 1933.

The first modern library opened in 1962 at the new City Hall, which was also the central library for many years before the opening of the Central Library. Over ten thousand library cards were issued in the first month of service, and borrowers were limited to only one book at a time. The second location and the first in Kowloon was the Waterloo Road Library, opened 1965 (later replaced by the Kowloon Public Library in 1984). The Pok Fu Lam Public Library opened next in December 1970 in the newly constructed Wah Fu Estate, and has served that community continuously for over 40 years. The first public library in the New Territories opened in Fuk Loi Estate, Tsuen Wan New Town, in 1974. In 1976 the first mobile library was introduced. The Tsuen Wan Central Library, at the time of its opening in July 1993, was the largest library in Hong Kong.

The public libraries were originally administered by either the Urban Council or Regional Council, depending on the location. When the municipal councils were abolished in 1999, the library systems were merged under the newly formed Leisure and Cultural Services Department.

The Hong Kong Central Library was completed in 2001 and is the largest public library in the territory. This twelve-story building is equipped with state-of-the-art technologies and serves as the administrative headquarters and main library of the public library network. It is also the major information centre for Hong Kong.

== Controversies ==
=== Book censorship ===
In July 2020, after the passage of the Hong Kong national security law, under the direction of the authorities, the library authority removed select pro-democracy books and marked them "under review". At least nine books were removed, including books by Joshua Wong, Tanya Chan and Horace Chin.

In 2021, it was discovered that libraries had removed 29 titles about the Tiananmen Massacre, with a total of 263 copies removed.

In May 2023, books by cartoonist Zunzi were removed from public libraries, with the LCSD saying, "Hong Kong Public Libraries will periodically review and remove books that do not comply with the development of the collection. Books that are suspected to potentially violate national security law or Hong Kong laws will be immediately removed for review." Hong Kong Free Press reported on multiple titles that were removed since 2020.

In July 2023, the LCSD said that the public is "welcome" to report books that may violate the national security law.

== See also ==
- List of libraries in Hong Kong
