= Daikiya =

Restaurant chain in Hong Kong

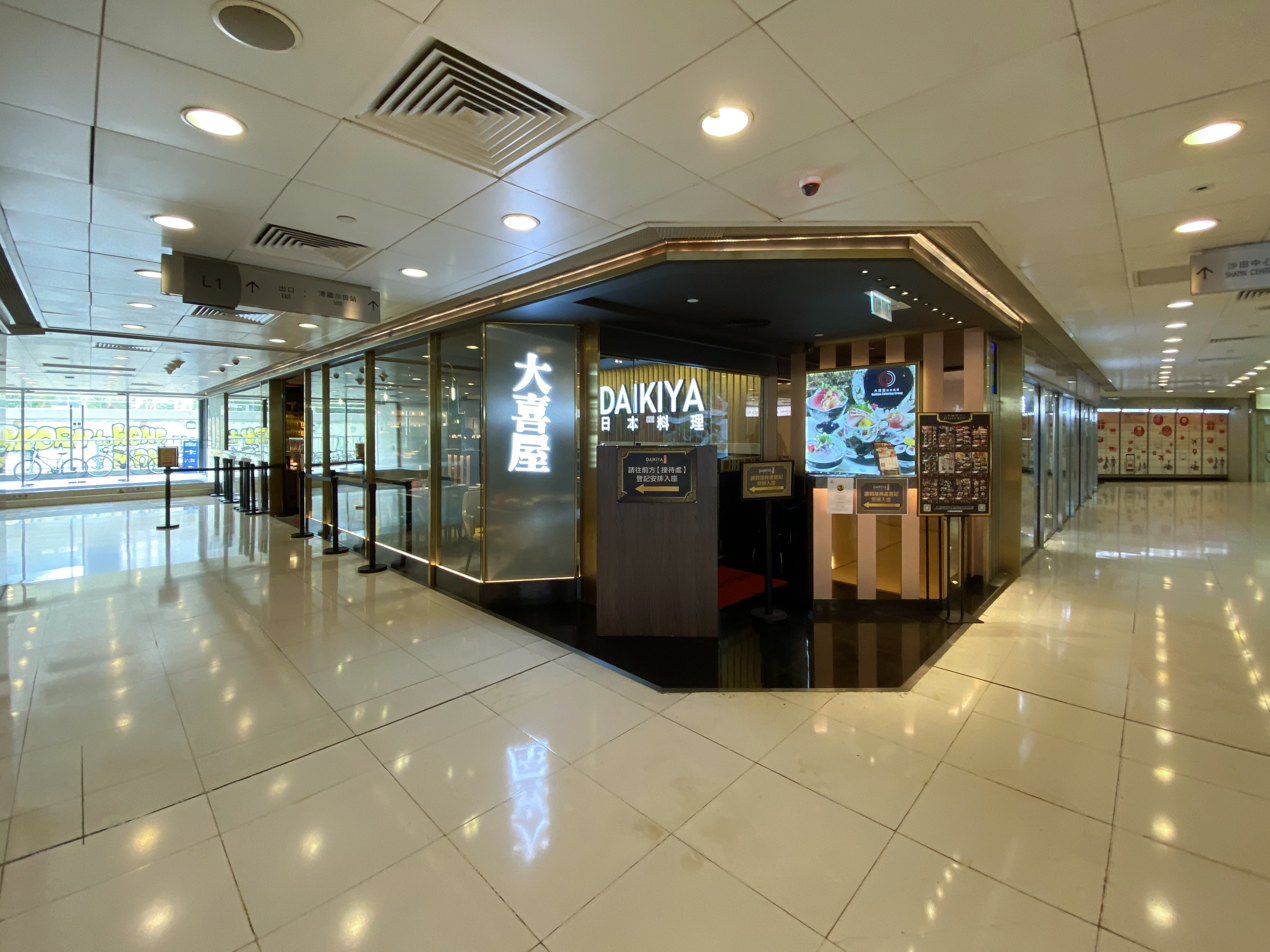
Daikiya branch in Shatin Plaza.

Daikiya Group (Chinese: 大喜屋) is a restaurant chain based in Hong Kong which focuses on Japanese-style buffets. The company was founded in 2010 and filed for its initial public offering (IPO) in June 2019.

The company is the largest Japanese-style buffet chain in Hong Kong, operating 13 branches and having a market share of 37.1% as of 2019. According to its IPO filing to the Hong Kong Stock Exchange, the company had an adjusted profit margin of 11.8% in 2018, higher than other restaurant chains in Hong Kong such as Fairwood and Café de Coral.

In February 2020, the company announced that it had decided not to proceed with its Hong Kong IPO.
