= New Town Plaza =

新城市廣場 New Town Plaza

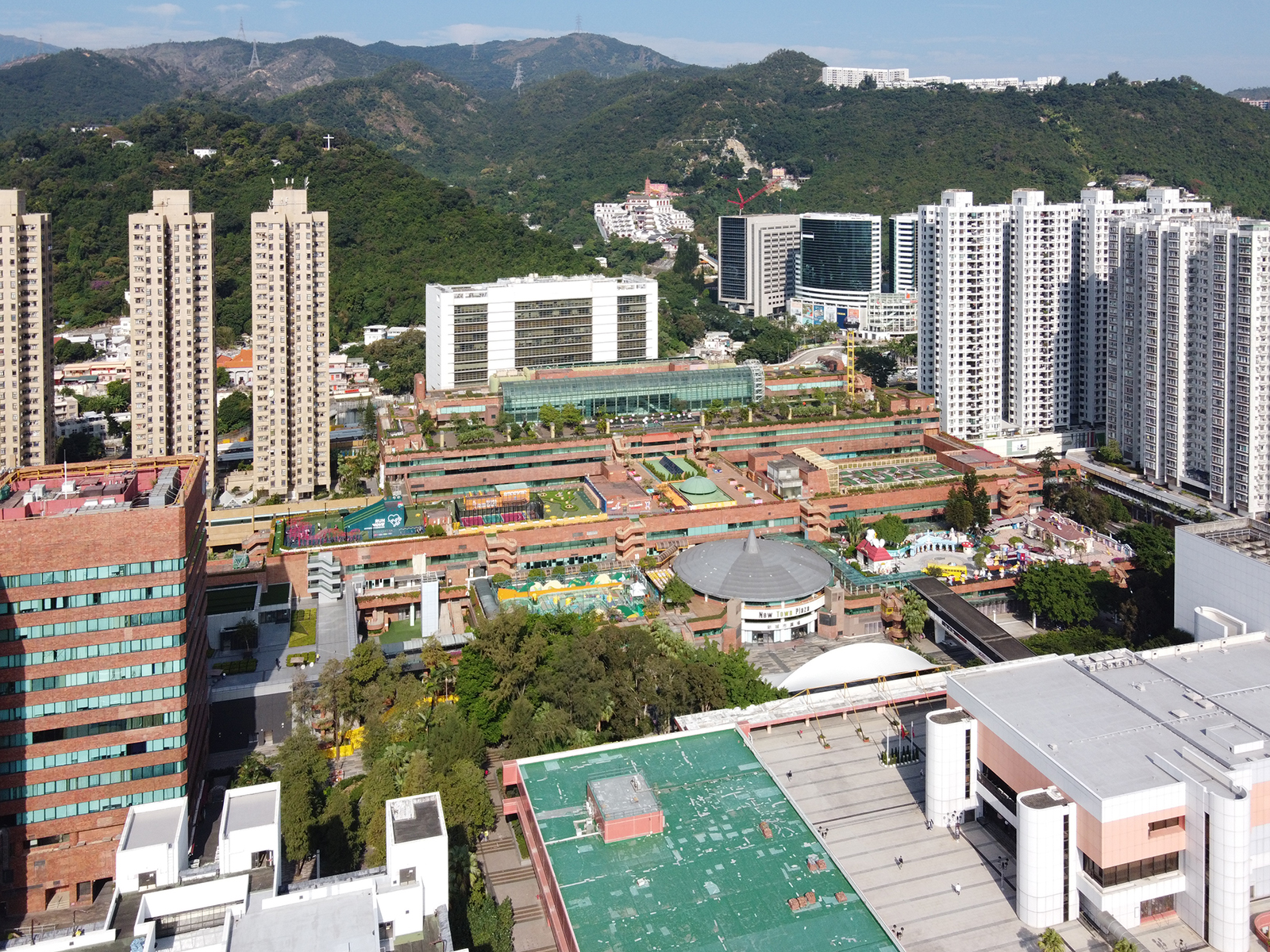
- New Town Plaza in November, 2020
- Location: 18-19 Sha Tin Centre Street, Sha Tin, Hong Kong
- Coordinates: 22.381947°N 114.188309°E
- Opened: 30 January 1985; 41 years ago
- Developer: Sun Hung Kai Properties
- Manager: Kai Shing Management
- Owner: Sun Hung Kai Properties
- Num. of stores: More than 400
- Floor area: 2,000,000 sq ft (190,000 m^{2})
- Floors: 9
- Public transit: Sha Tin station
- Website: www.newtownplaza.com.hk

New Town Plaza
- Traditional Chinese: 新城市廣場
- Simplified Chinese: 新城市广场
Transcriptions
Standard Mandarin
- Hanyu Pinyin: Xīn Chéngshì Guǎngchǎng
Yue: Cantonese
- Yale Romanization: Sān sìhng síh gwóng chèuhng
- Jyutping: San1 sing4 si5 gwong2 coeng4

New Town Plaza is a shopping mall in the town centre of Sha Tin, Hong Kong(沙田社中心). Developed by Sun Hung Kai Properties, it was the biggest shopping centre in the New Territories when it was completed in the early 1980s. Covering 200,000 square metres (49.4 acres), the plaza comprises Phase 1 (the main mall) and Phase 3, which are connected to each other, as well as the Grand Central Plaza, which is less than one kilometre from Phase 1. Phase 1 underwent extensive renovation from 2003 to 2008.

The nine-storey shopping centre is right next to Sha Tin station and Citylink Plaza. It is one of the busiest shopping malls in Hong Kong. There are many different transportation links to New Town Plaza, such as shuttle services from nearby estates, minibus routes, the MTR station located right within the plaza itself, and so forth.

== Floor plan ==
=== Phase 1 ===
- LB: Play Park
- UB: Play Park
- Level 1: MOVIE TOWN Cinema, restaurants
- Level 2: c!ty'super, Uniqlo, Beauty & Health Care
- Level 3: Luxury & Beauty, Fashion, Cosmetics, agnès b., Bally, Coach, American Eagle, ZARA, Tommy Hilfiger, SaSa and a roof garden with Pet play area
- Level 4: Fashion & Accessories, Apple Store, IT, G2000, H&M
- Level 5: Trendy, Casual & Sports Wear and a roof garden
- Level 6: Electric World (Fortess, DG Lifestyle, Broadway, Suning, AV Life)
- Level 7: THE MENU@Level 7, a CD shop and a roof garden in which a music fountain is included
- Level 8: Maxim's Chinese Restaurant
- Level 9: Roof garden

=== Phase 3 ===
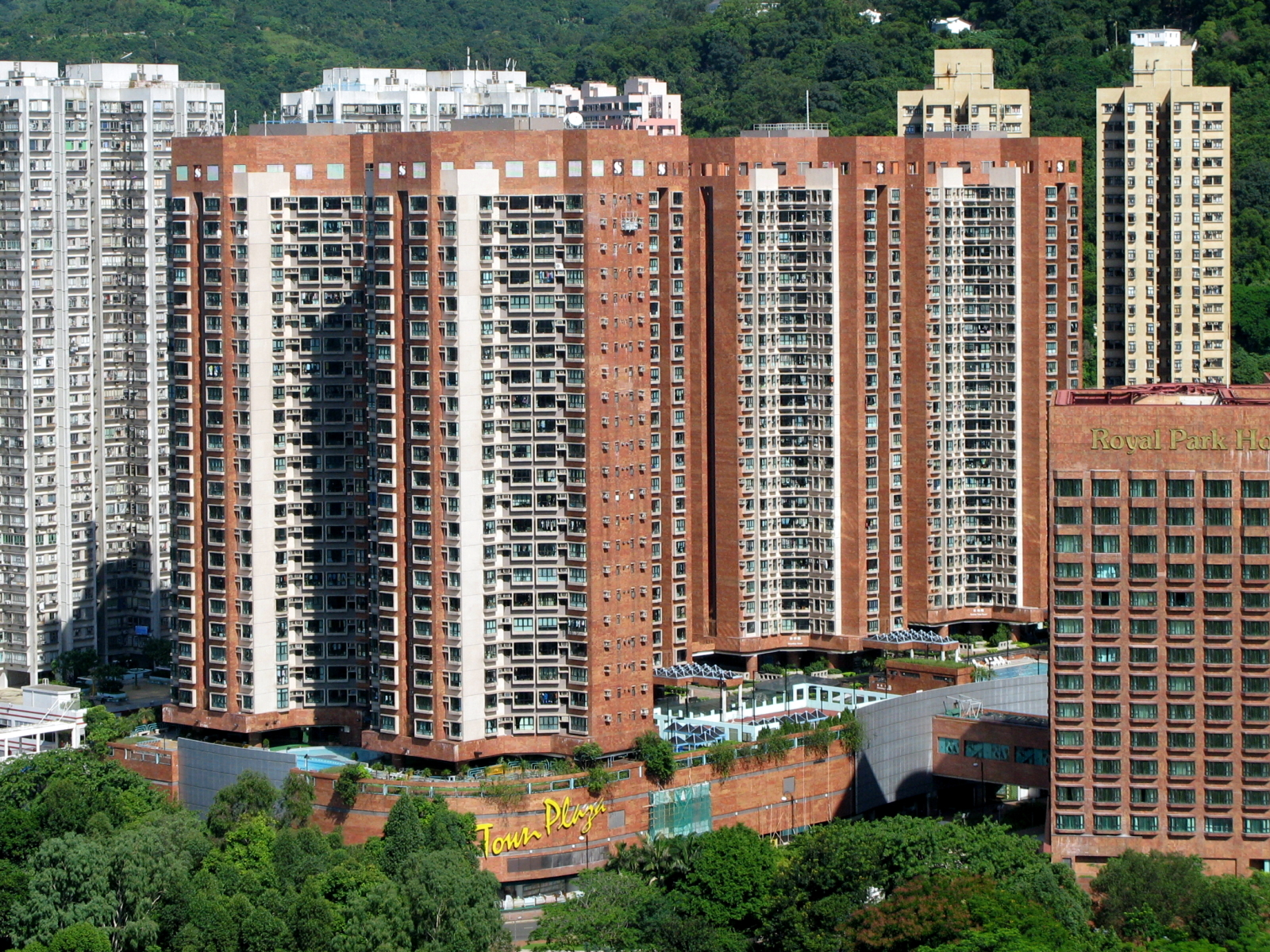
New Town Plaza Phase 3 in August 2007

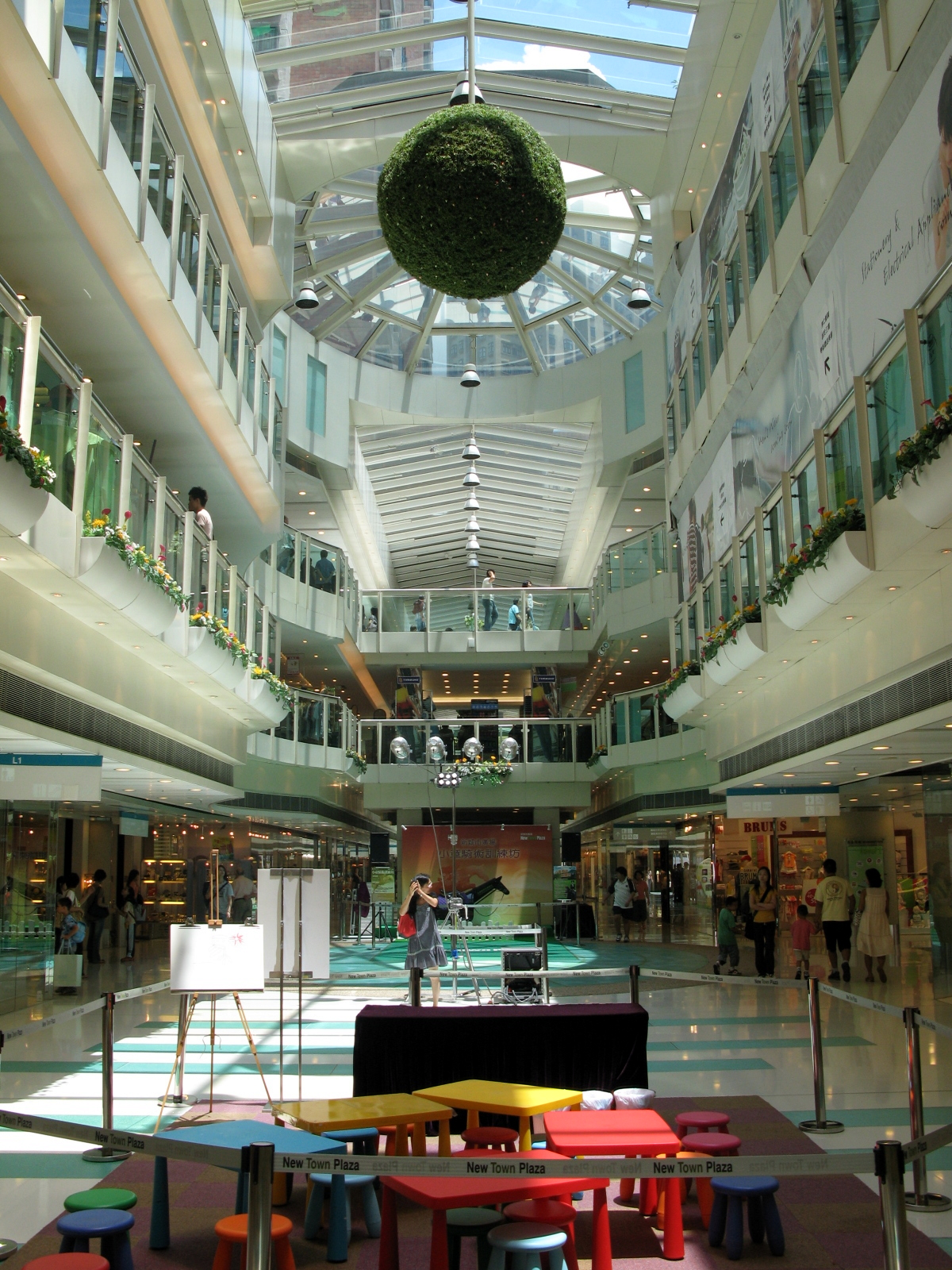
New Town Plaza Phase 3 atrium has been removed after the renovation in 2017. Taken in July 2007.

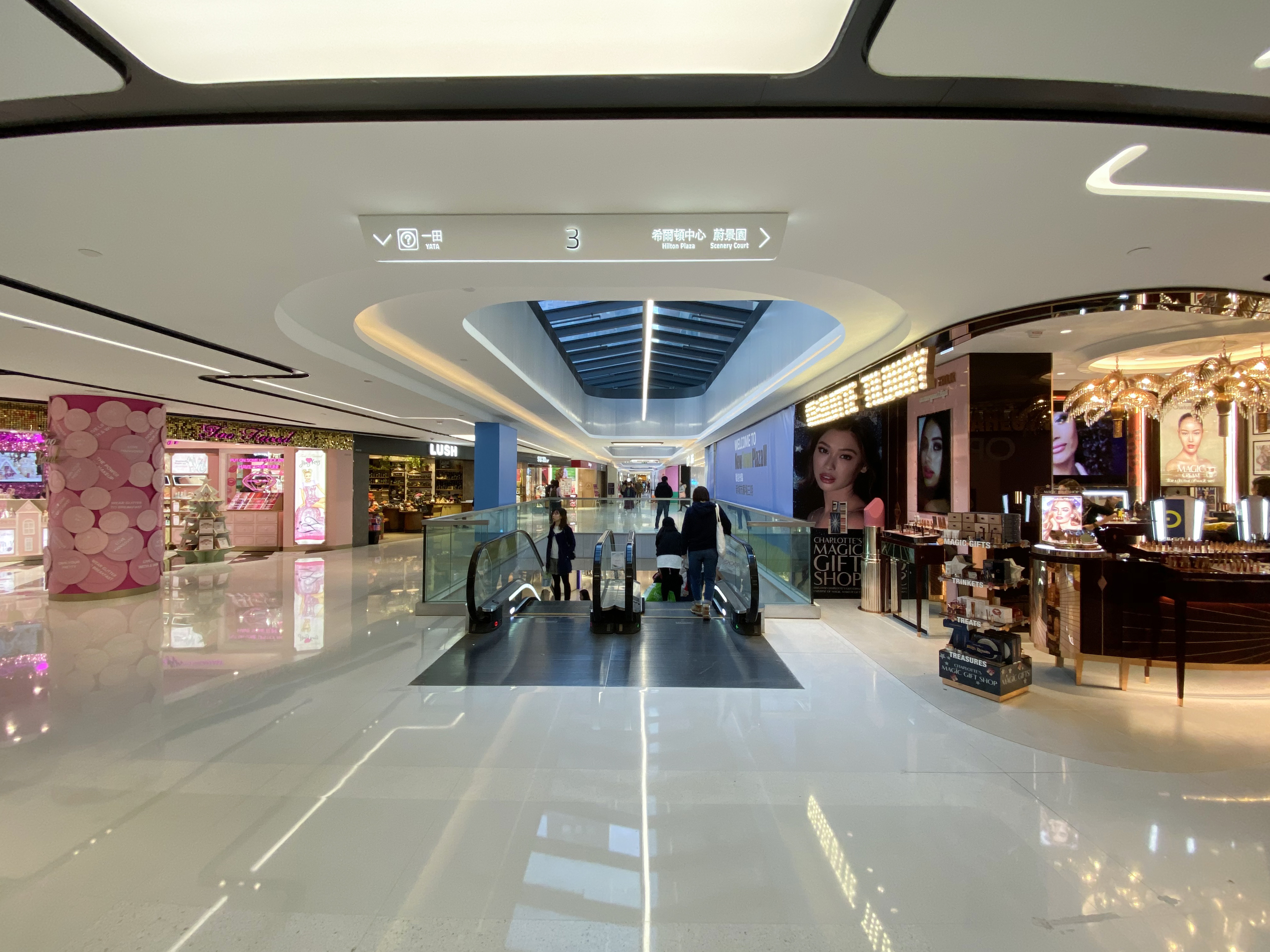
New Town Plaza Phase 3 after the renovation in 2019

New Town Plaza Phase 3 (新城市廣場第三期) is a private housing estate and a shopping arcade. It comprises 5 high-rise buildings and a 3-floor shopping arcade built between 1990 and 1991. Phase 3 underwent extensive renovation from 2017 to 2019, to increase the shops, the existing atrium from Level 1 to Level 2 have been removed.

Layout of the shopping arcade after renovation:

- Level 1: Yata (一田), Department Store, Drop off area
- Level 2: Toys "R" Us, Commercial Press, MUJI, Children's wear and various stores
- Level 3: Decathlon, Foot Locker, GU, comesics store and restaurants

Layout of the shopping arcade before renovation:

- Level 1: Toys "R" Us, Commercial Press, Children's wear and various stores, Drop off area
- Level 2: Yata (一田) Department Store
- Level 3: Yata supermarket & food court, fashion store, comesics store and various stores

=== Grand Central Plaza ===
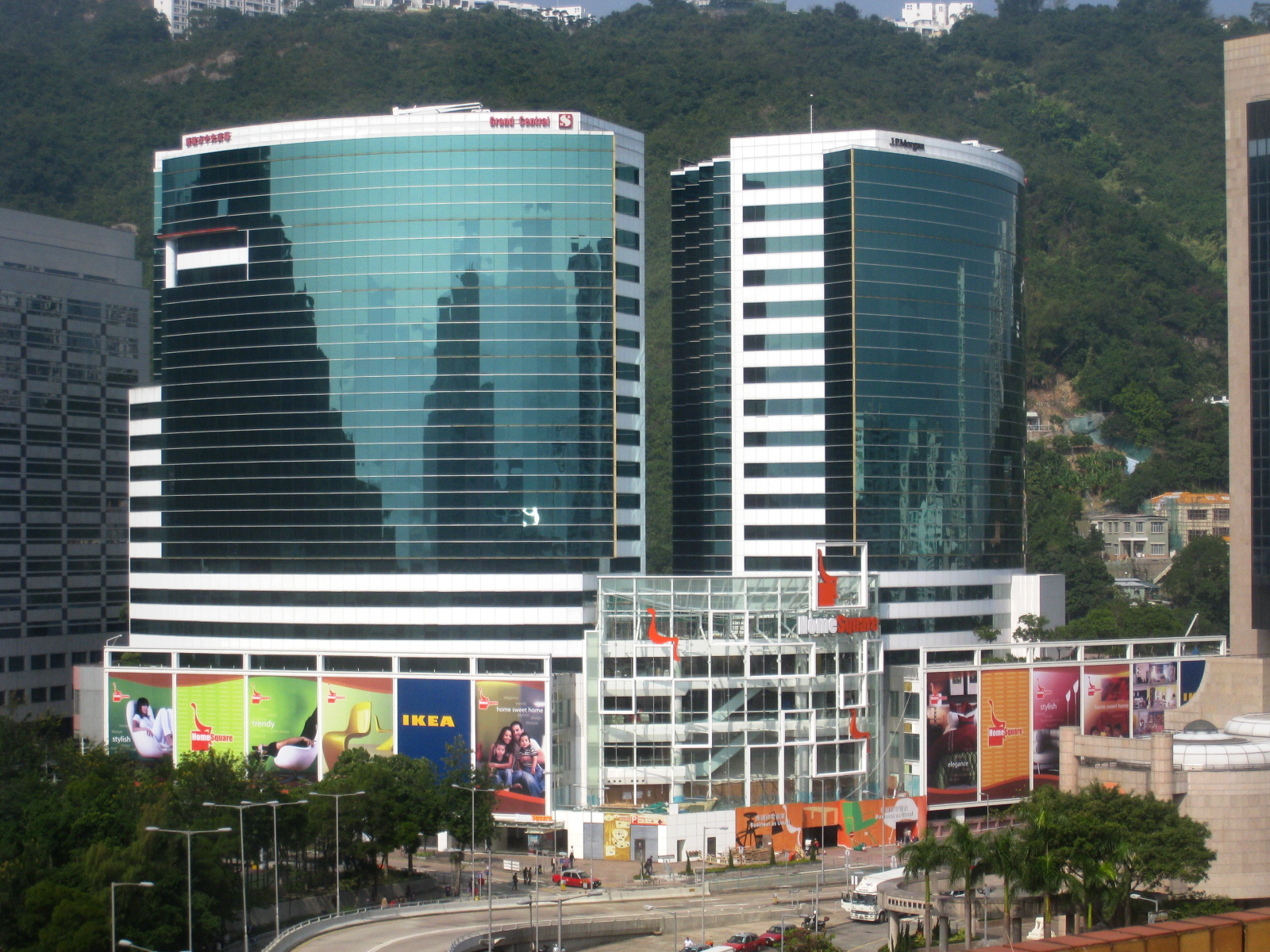
Grand Central Plaza in December 2009

The Grand Central Plaza complex (新城市中央廣場) houses the HomeSquare shopping mall.

- Levels 1 – 3: Furniture
- Levels 5 & 6: IKEA flagship store in Hong Kong, in which a restaurant serving Swedish dishes is included

== Snoopy's World ==
On the podium of Level 3 of Phase 1, there is an outdoor playground called the "Snoopy's World" (Chinese: 史努比開心世界), the first Peanuts outdoor playground in Asia. It opened to the public on 1 September 2000.

=== Spots in Snoopy's World ===
- Doghouse Entry: the Snoopy House
- School Plaza: Peanuts Academy
- Boating Canal: Canoe Ride
- Baseball Playground: Peanuts Dugout
- Mini Town Area: Peanuts Boulevard
- Covered Sitting Pavilion: Party Pavilion
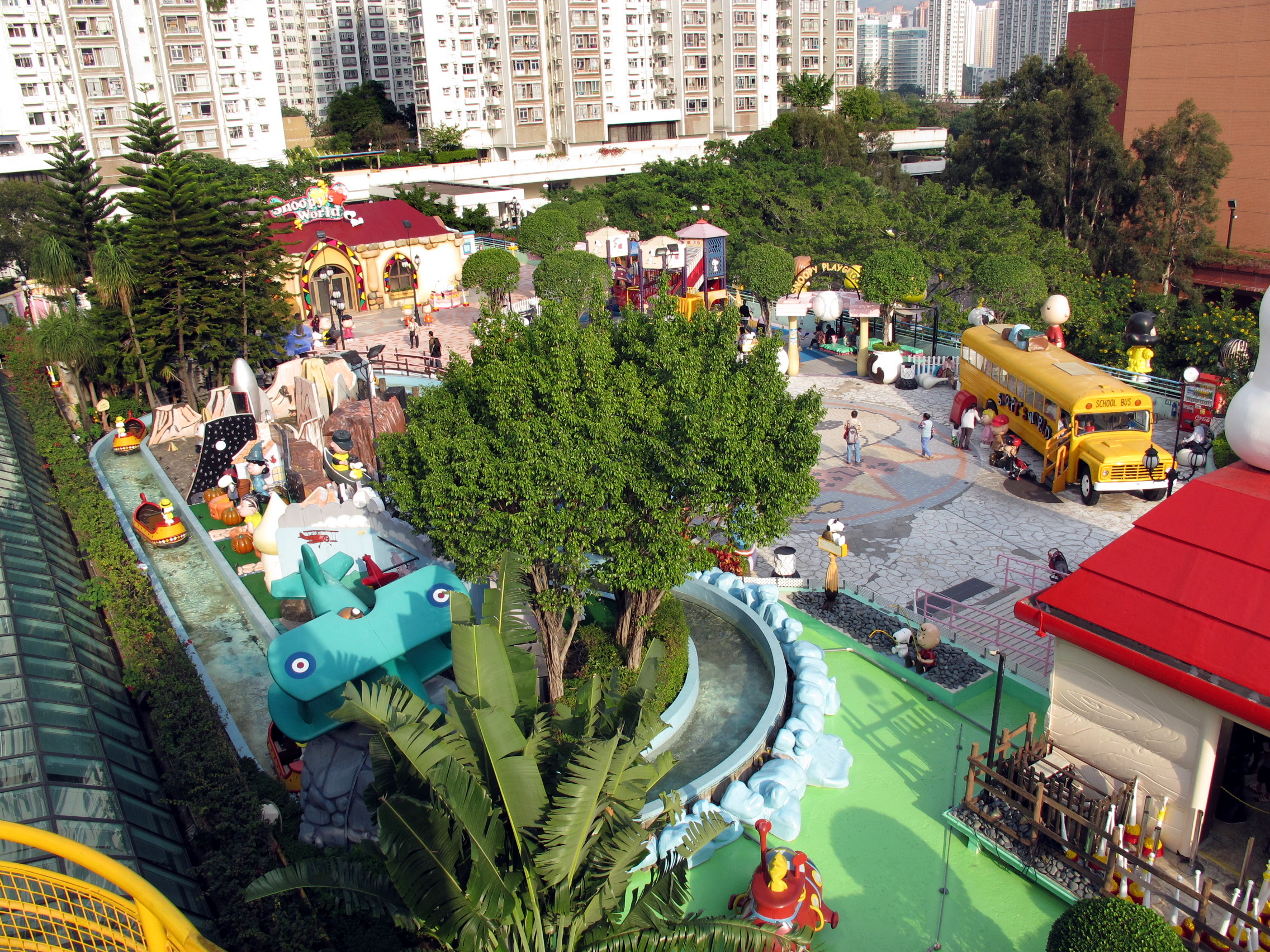
Overview of Snoopy World

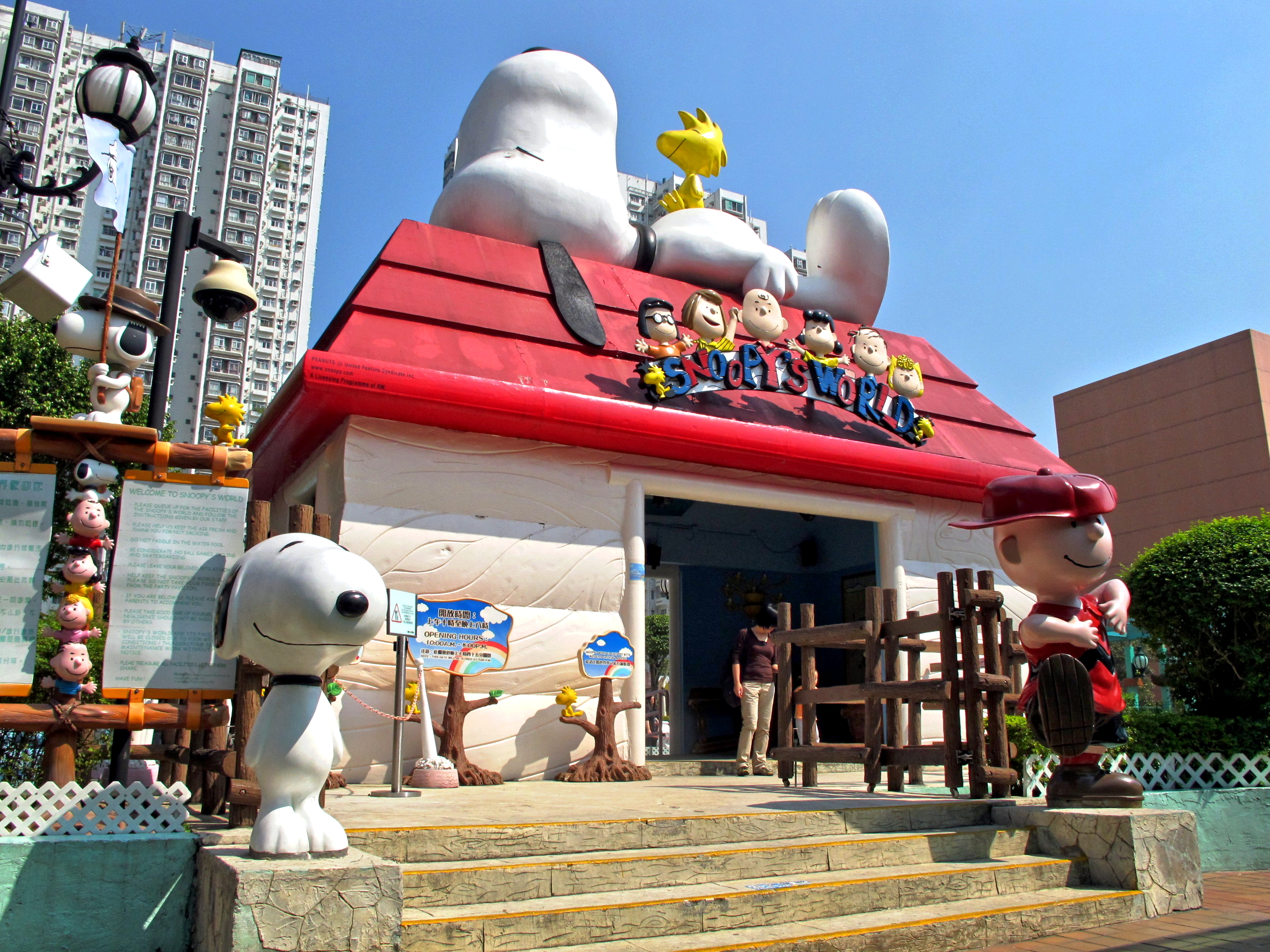
Entrance of Snoopy's World in November 2010

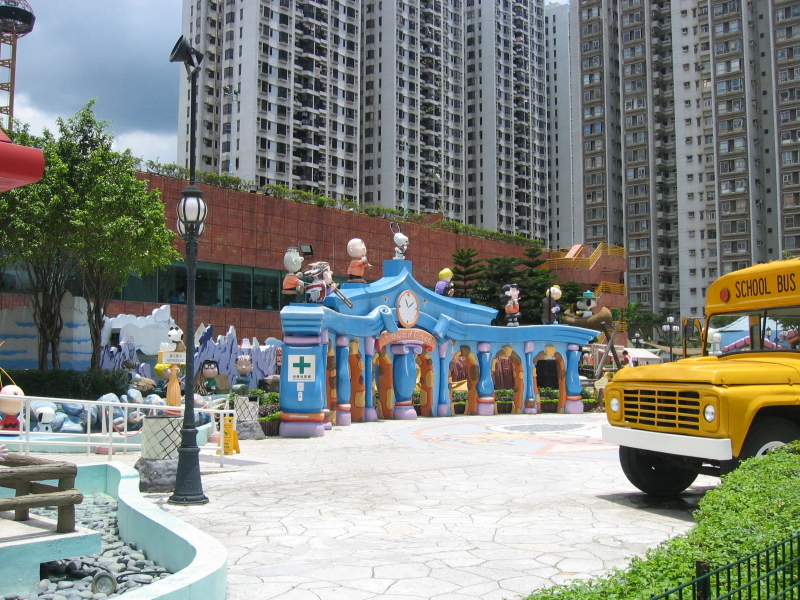
Snoopy's World Entry Plaza in June 2005

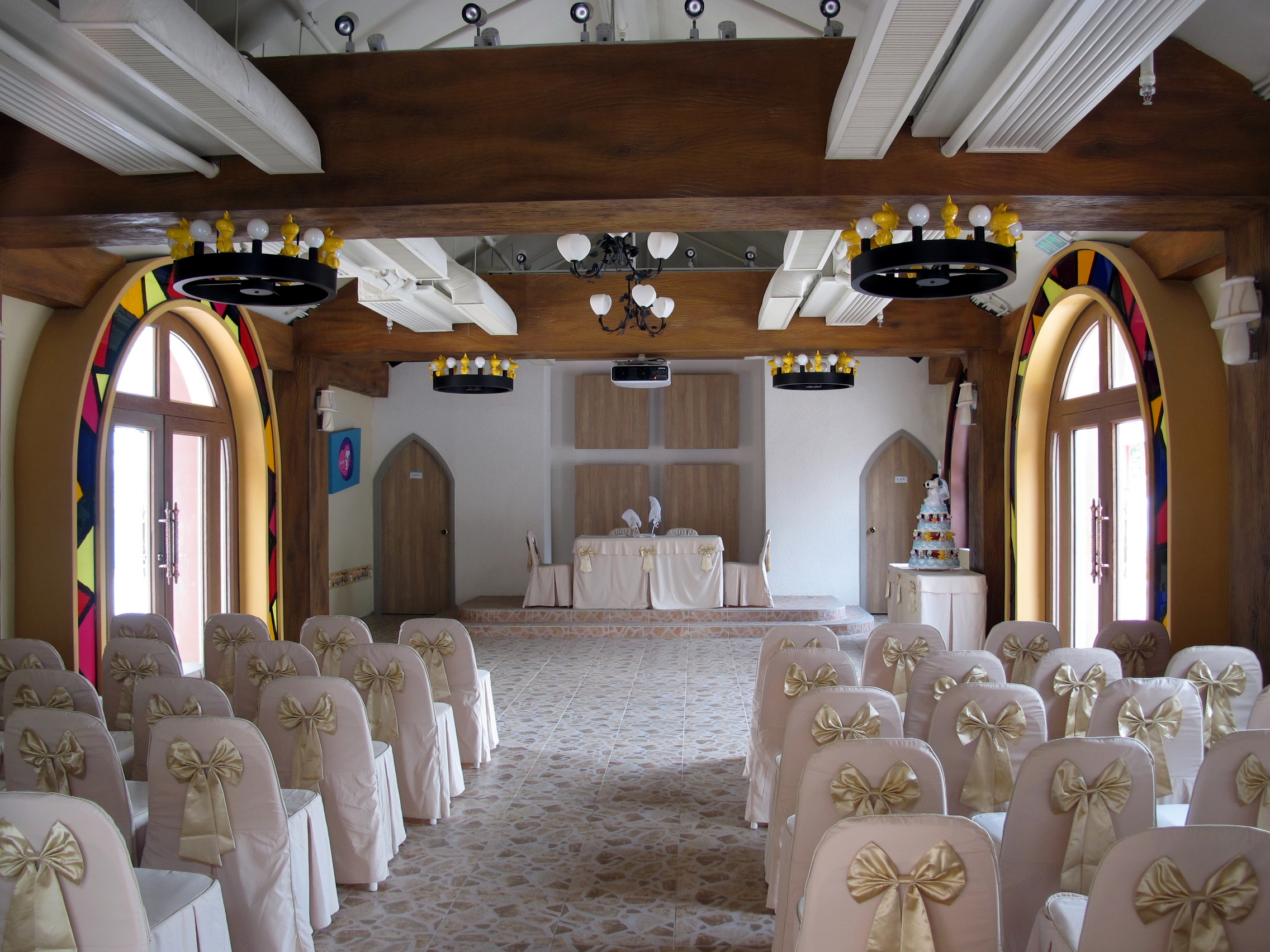
Snoppy World Hall in July 2011

== Musical fountain ==
When New Town Plaza Phase 1 opened, an oval musical fountain at the centre of Level 3 was an icon of the shopping mall and the largest musical fountain in Asia. It was demolished in August 2004 and then, in May 2005, rebuilt on the roof garden of Level 7, opening in November that year. But it was then closed in 2015 which is the year of New Town Plaza has opened 30 years.

== Phase 1 gallery ==
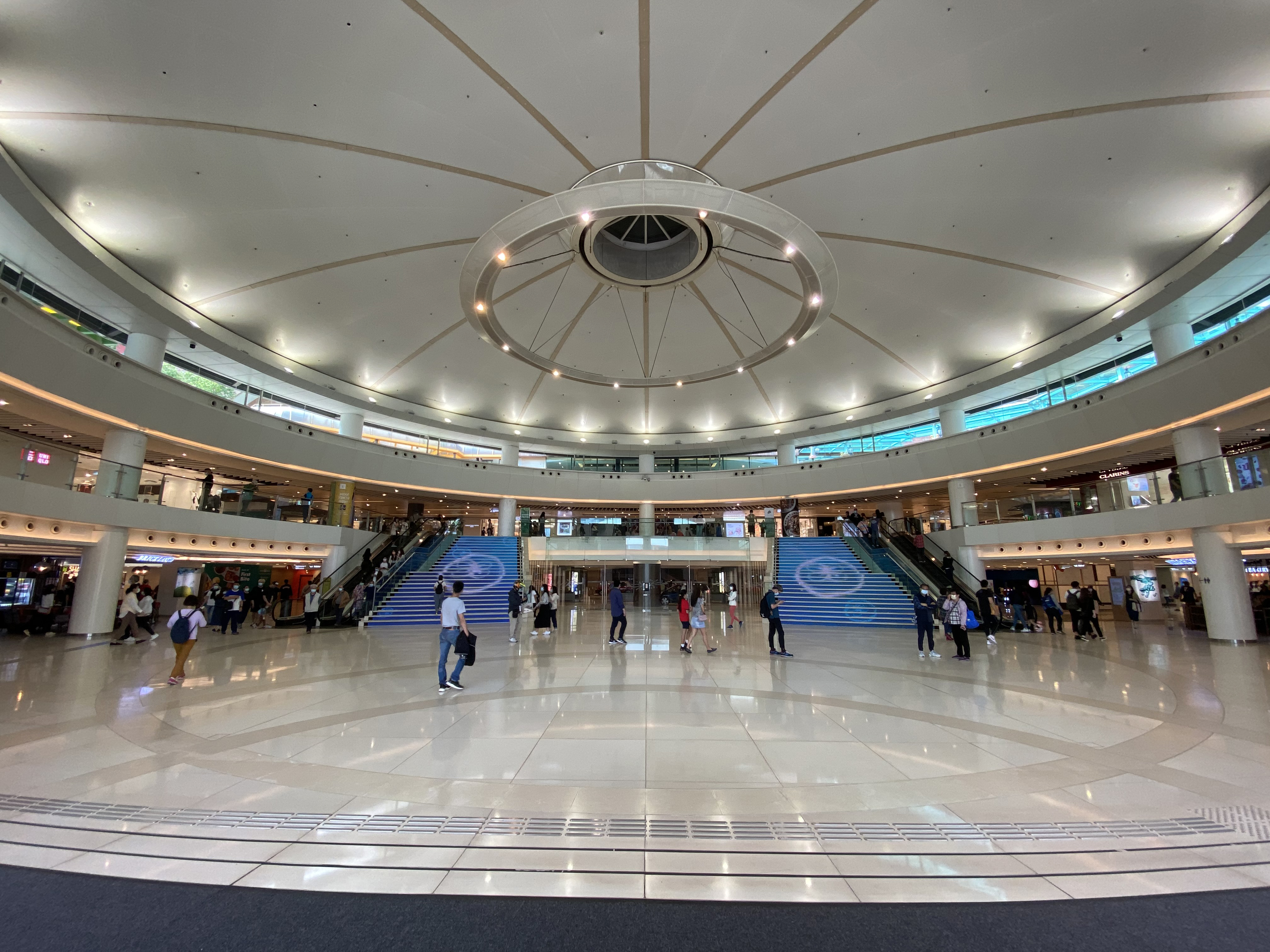
Entrance Arena in 2021

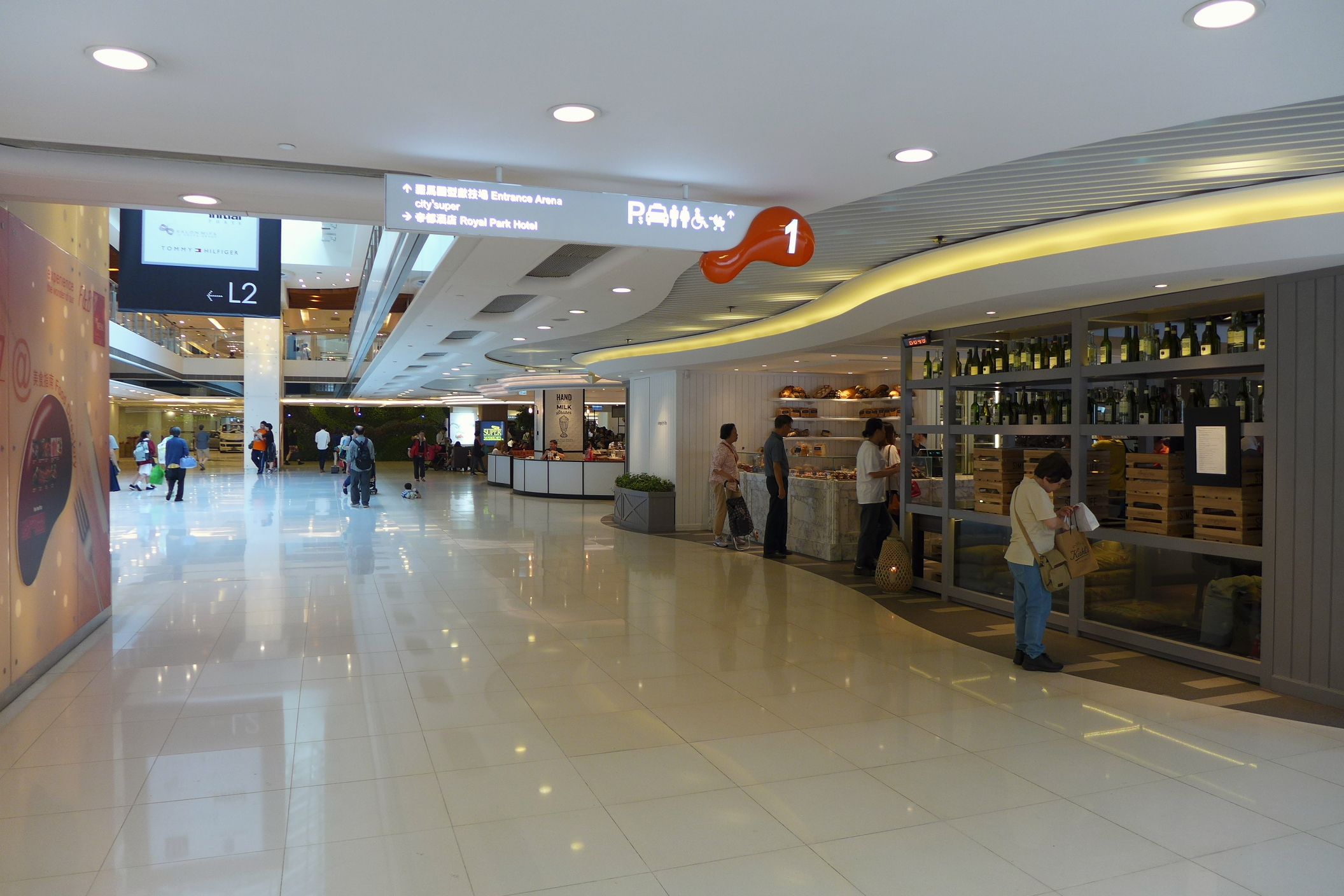
Level 1 Restaurants

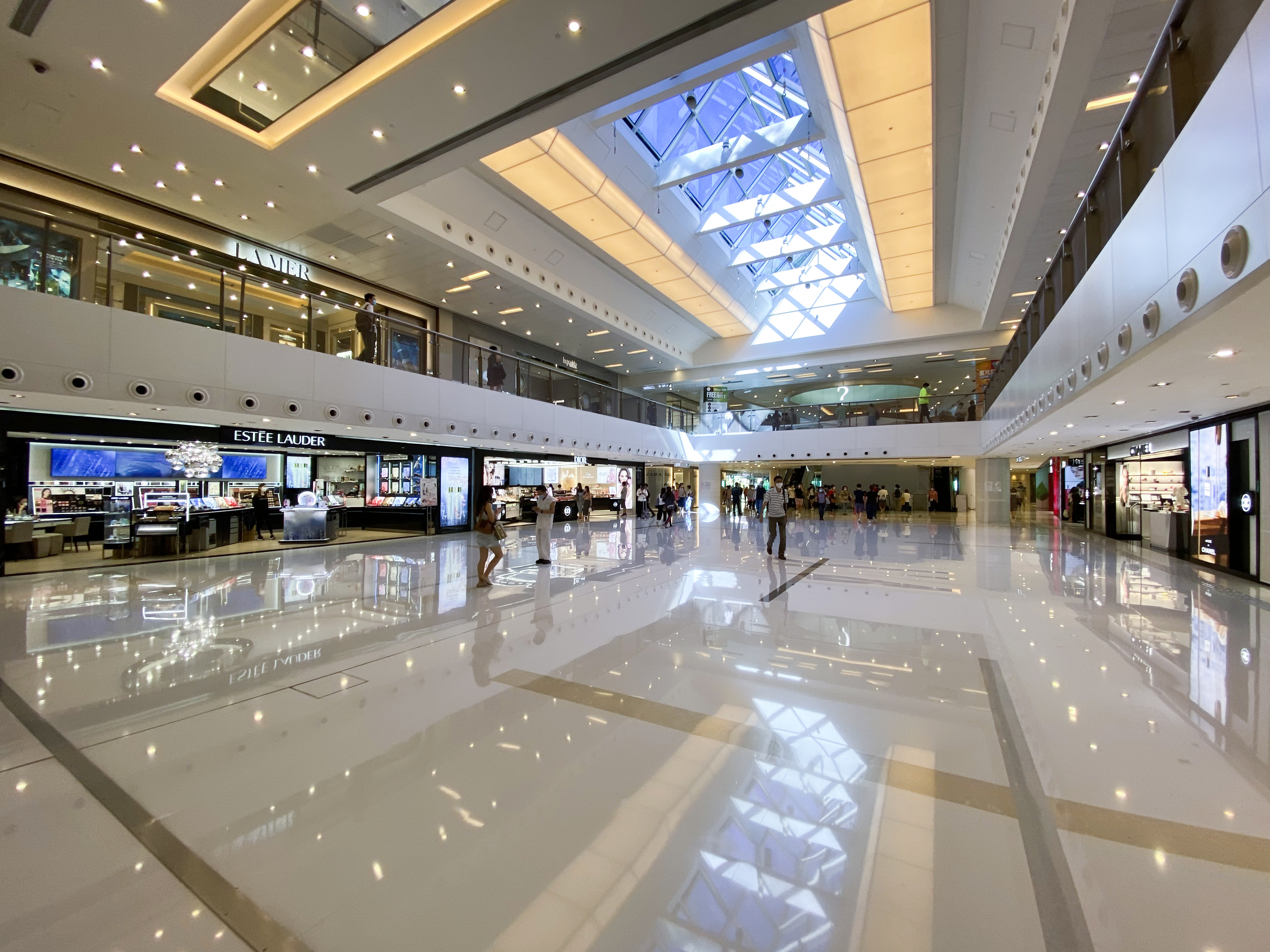
Level 3 Footbridge Gallery in 2020

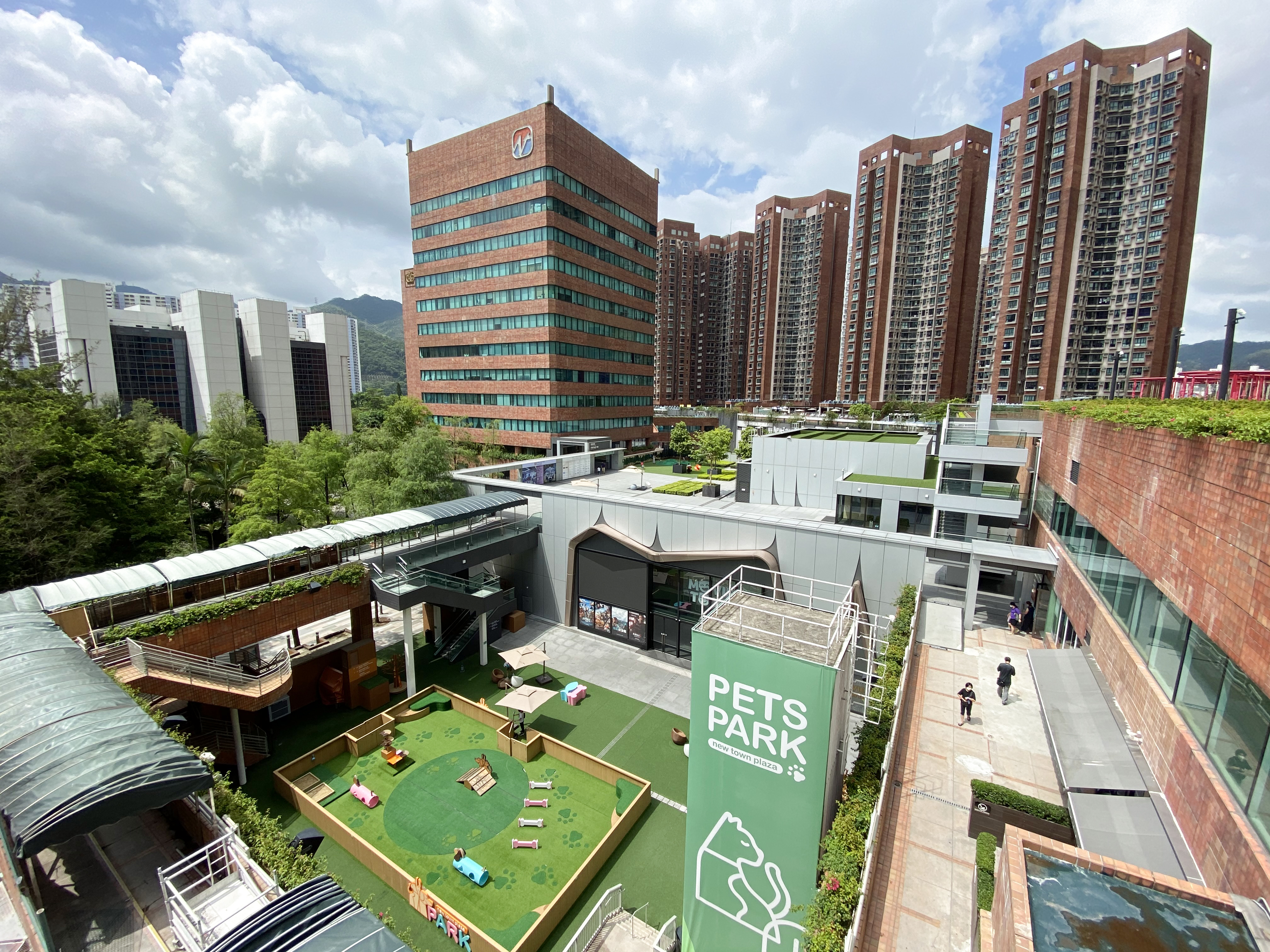
New Town Plaza Cinema Complex

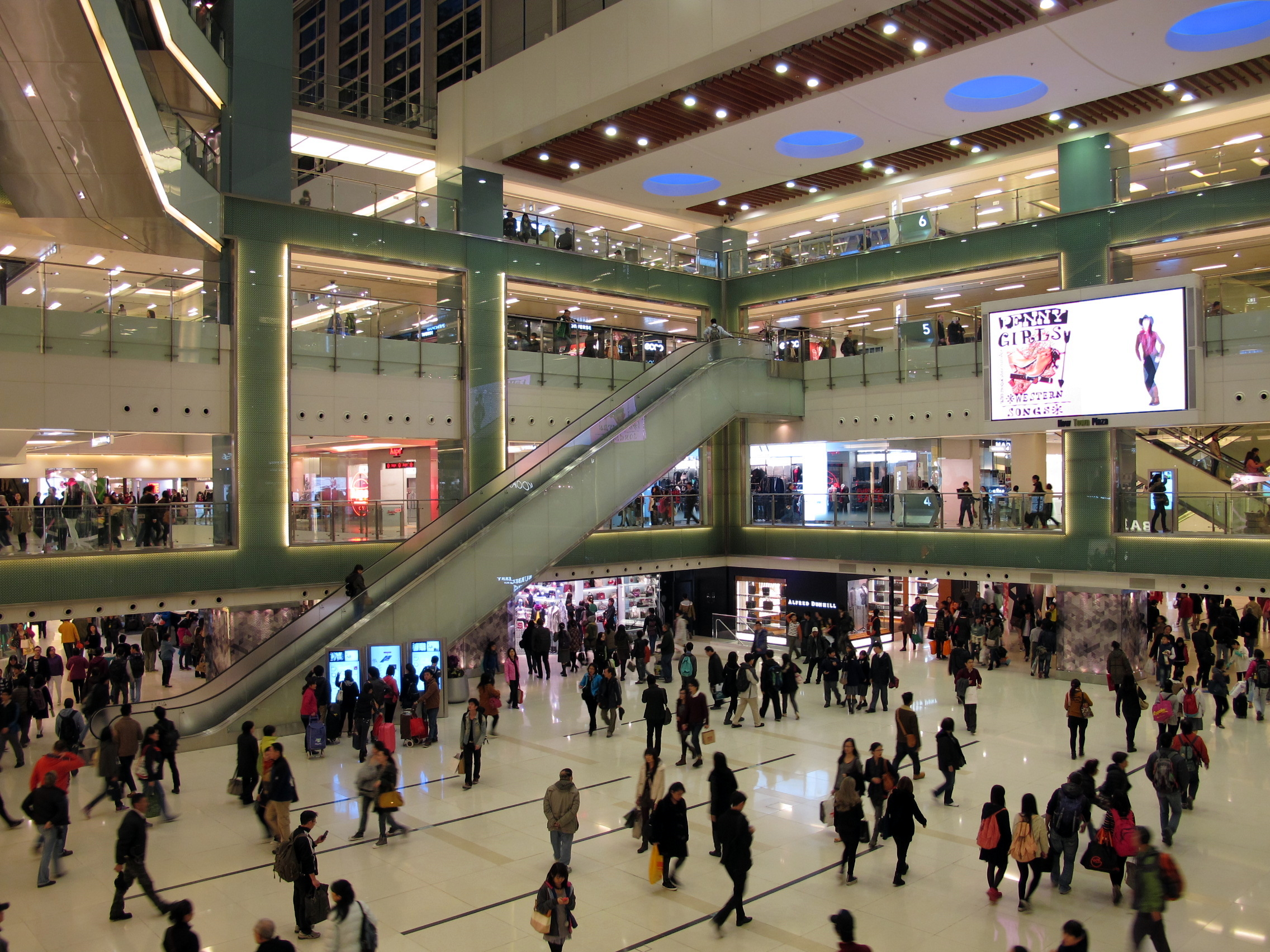
New Town Plaza after renovation in January 2013

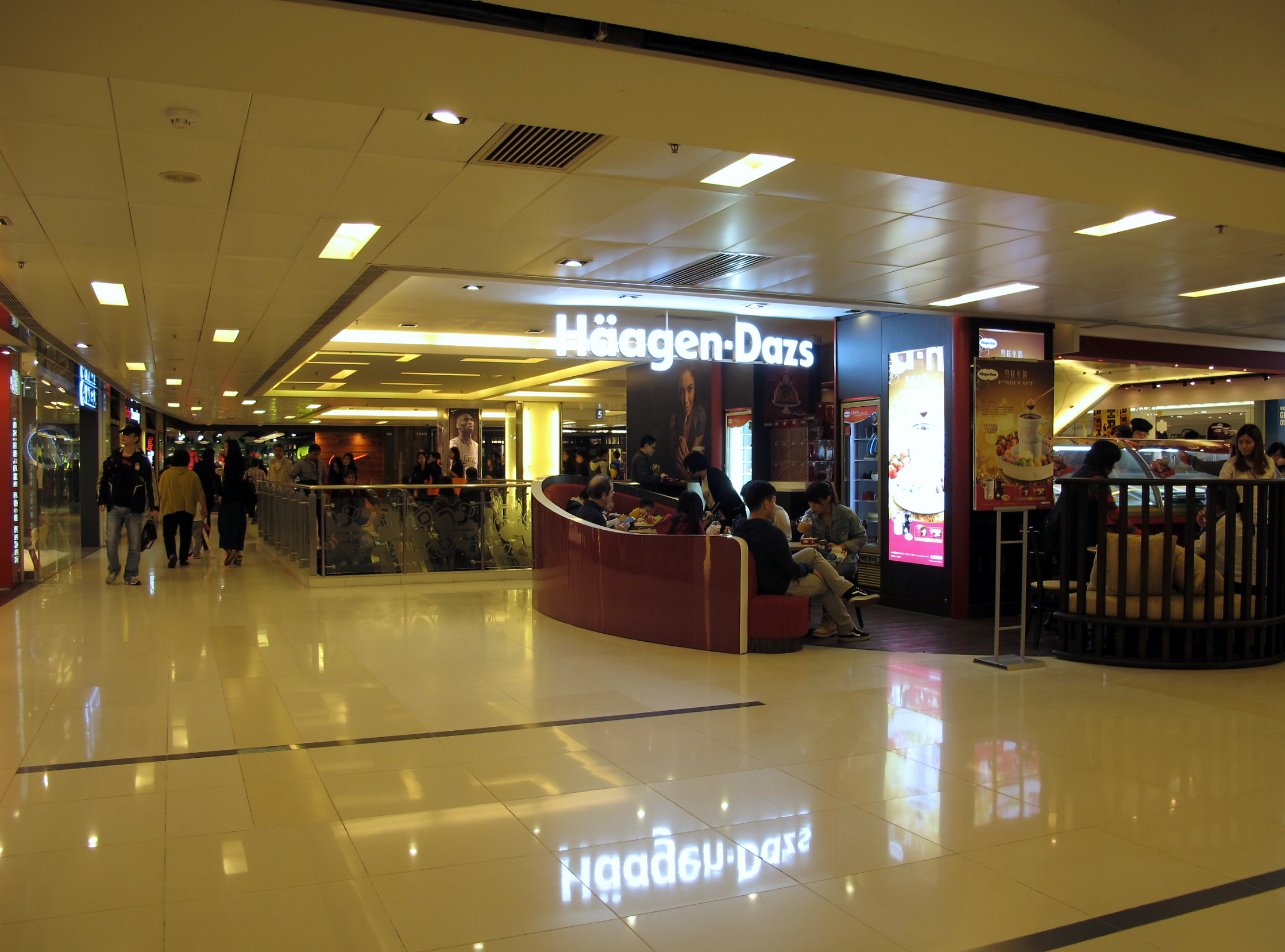
Shops in Level 5 in November 2012

== Nearby shopping malls ==
- New Town Plaza Phase 3 (新城市廣場第三期)
- Grand Central Plaza (新城市中央廣場)
- Citylink Plaza (連城廣場)
- Shatin Centre (沙田中心)
- Shatin Plaza (沙田廣場)
- Lucky Plaza (好運中心)
- Wai Wah Centre (偉華中心)
- Hilton Plaza (希爾頓中心)

== Nearby facilities ==
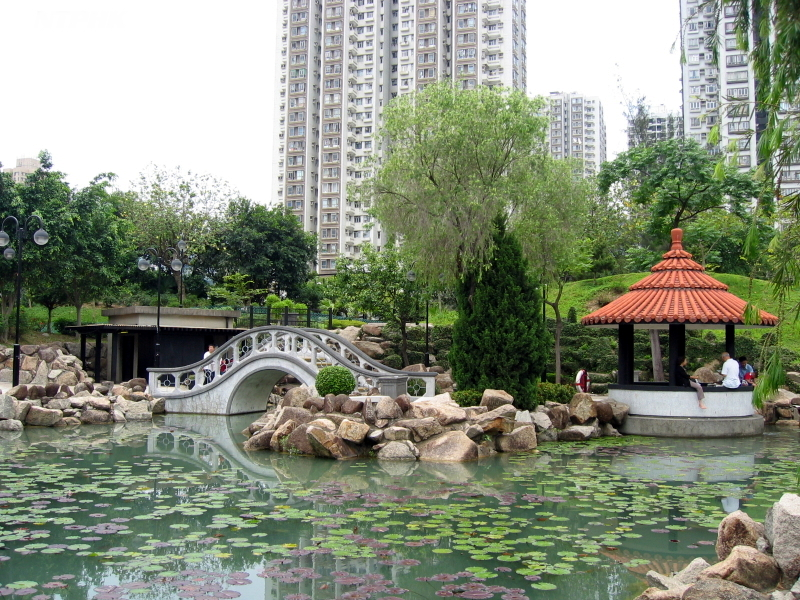
Sha Tin Park in May 2005

- Sha Tin Town Hall (沙田大會堂)
- Sha Tin Public Library (沙田公共圖書館)
- Sha Tin Marriage Registry (沙田婚姻註冊處)
- Sha Tin Park (沙田公園)
- Royal Park Hotel (帝都酒店), also developed by Sun Hung Kai Properties, and is regarded as Phase 2 of the New Town Plaza project. It has been designated as the Olympic Village in Hong Kong for the Beijing Olympics 2008.

== During the 2019–2020 Hong Kong protests ==
On 25 August 2019, the protesters were applauded by the public as they passed by New Town Plaza in the evening after a confrontation with the police.

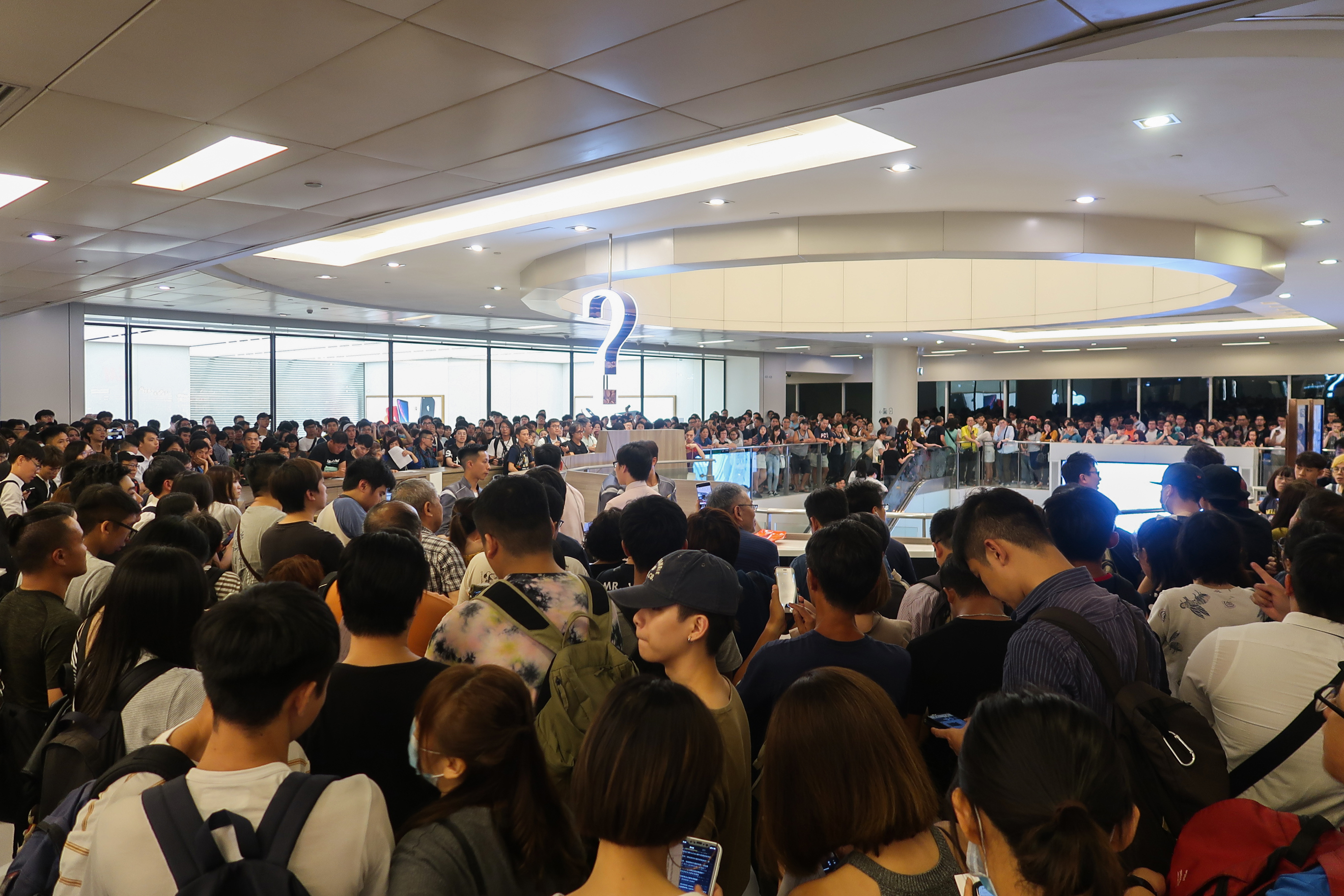
People complaint in New Town Plaza Customer Service Centre on 16 July 2019

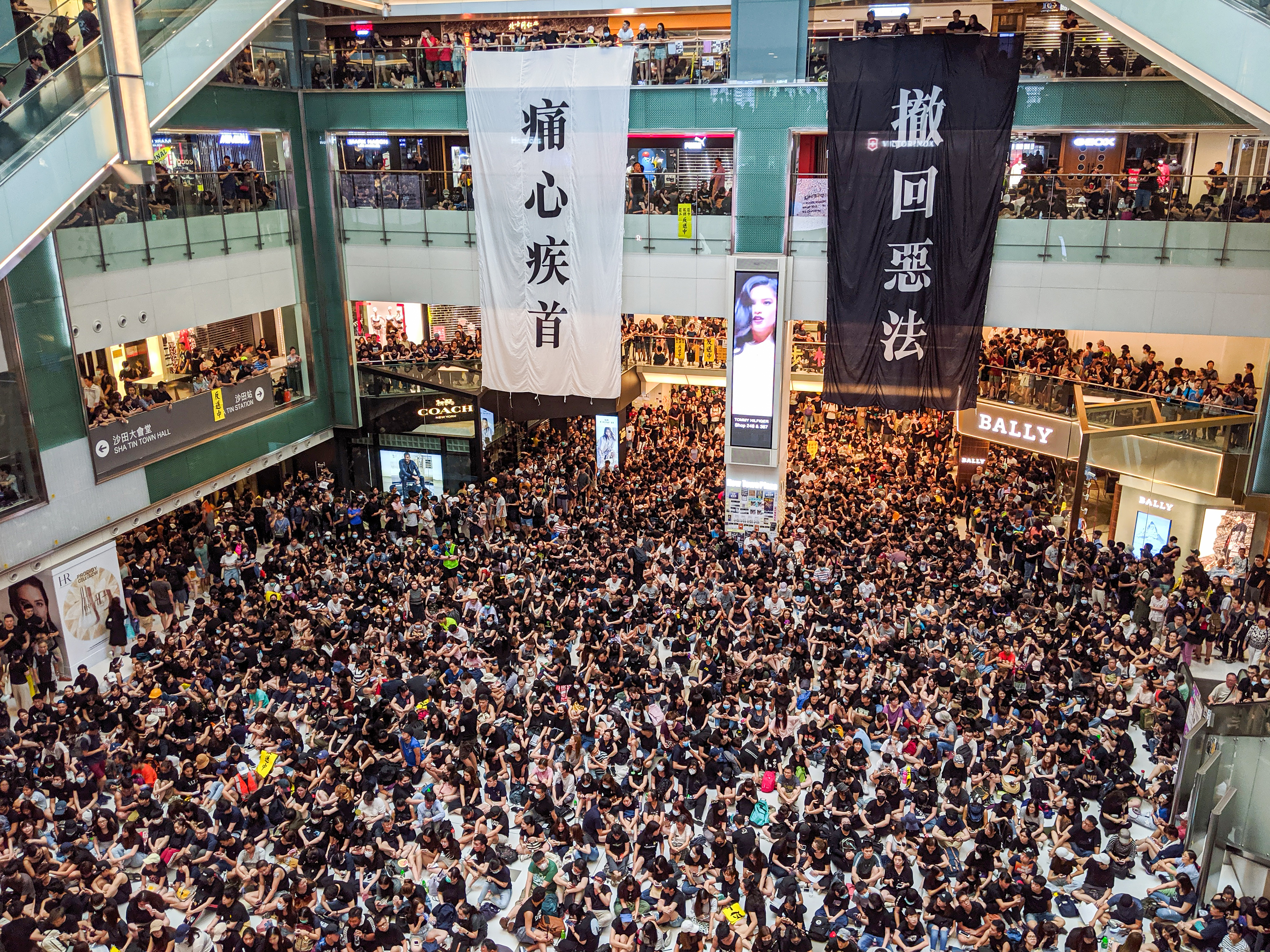
Protesters gathering at New Town Plaza, Sha Tin, Hong Kong on 5 August 2019

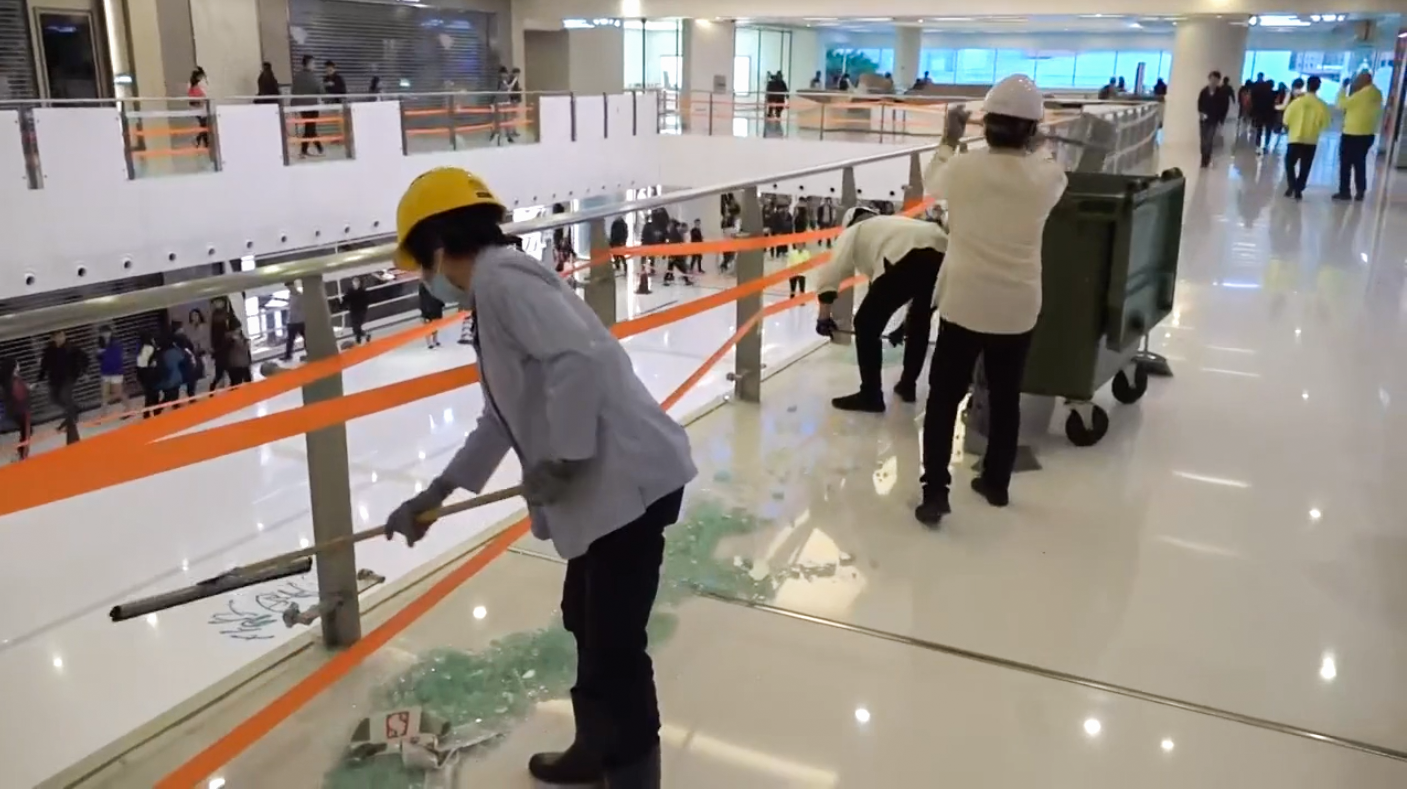
Workers cleaning glass in footbridge gallery on 15 December 2019

New Town Plaza is one of the key locations for the 2019–2020 Hong Kong protests, which originated from a peaceful protest held on 14 July in Sha Tin escalated into intense confrontations between the protesters and the police when the protesters were kettled inside New Town Plaza. Sun Hung Kai Properties were scrutinised for allowing the police to enter the shopping centre without proper permit.

In September 2019, protesters gathered several times in different shopping malls to sing for the song Glory to Hong Kong. On 11 September 2019, around 1000 people sang the song in New Town Plaza together that night, with crowds of people singing the song in other shopping malls around Hong Kong as well.

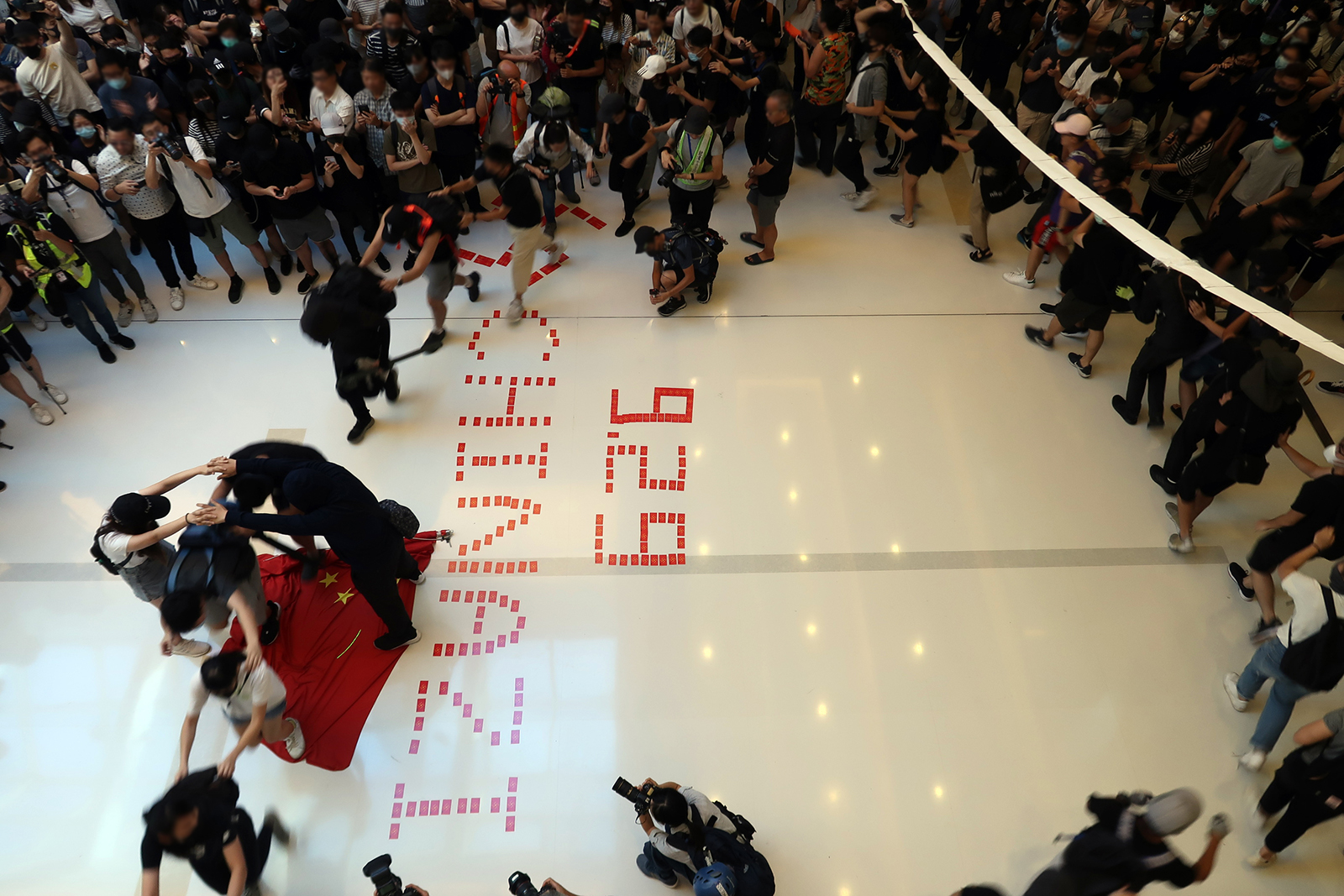
People dancing and trampling on the Flag of China in New Town Plaza on 22 September 2019

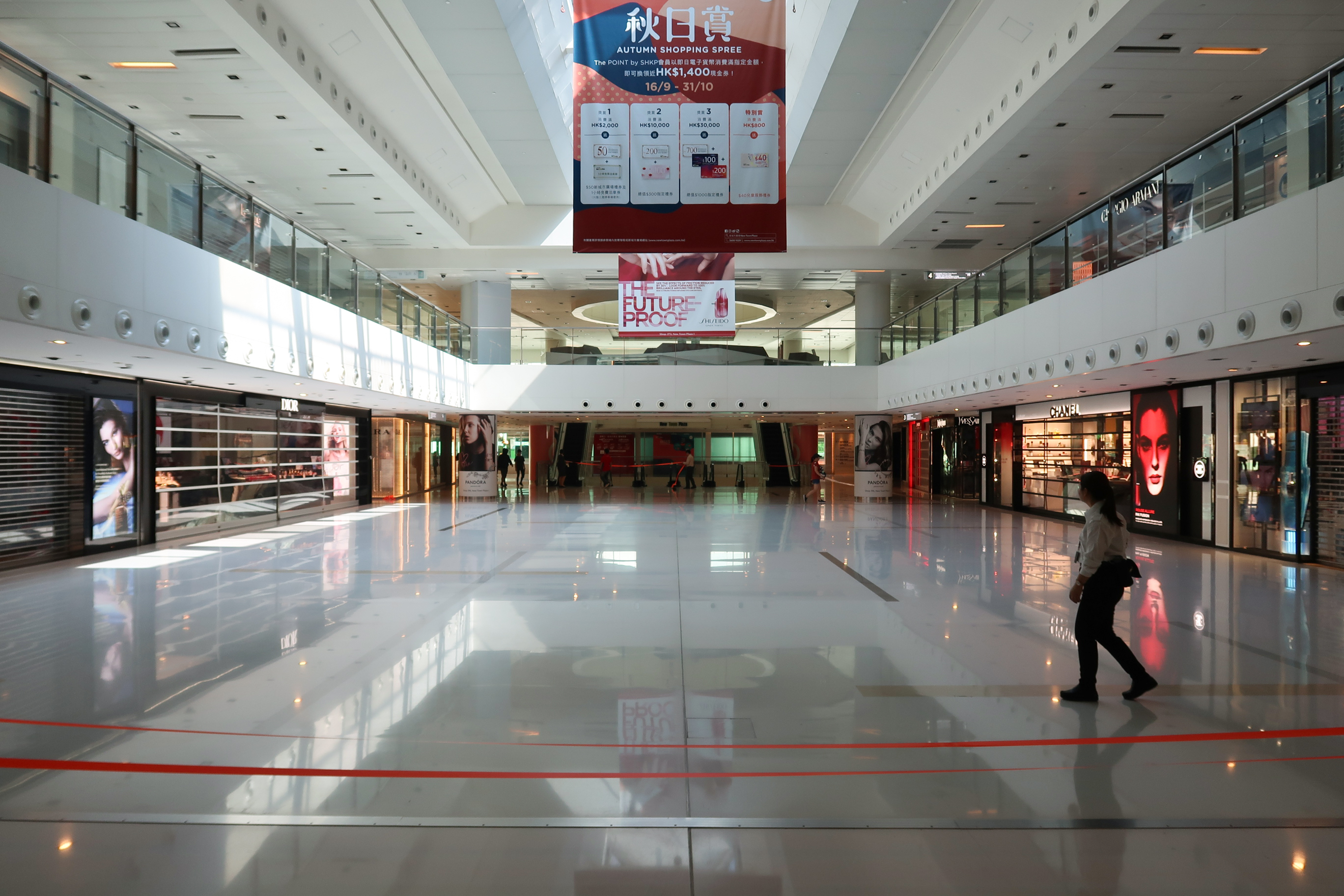
Public access blocked on 1 October 2019

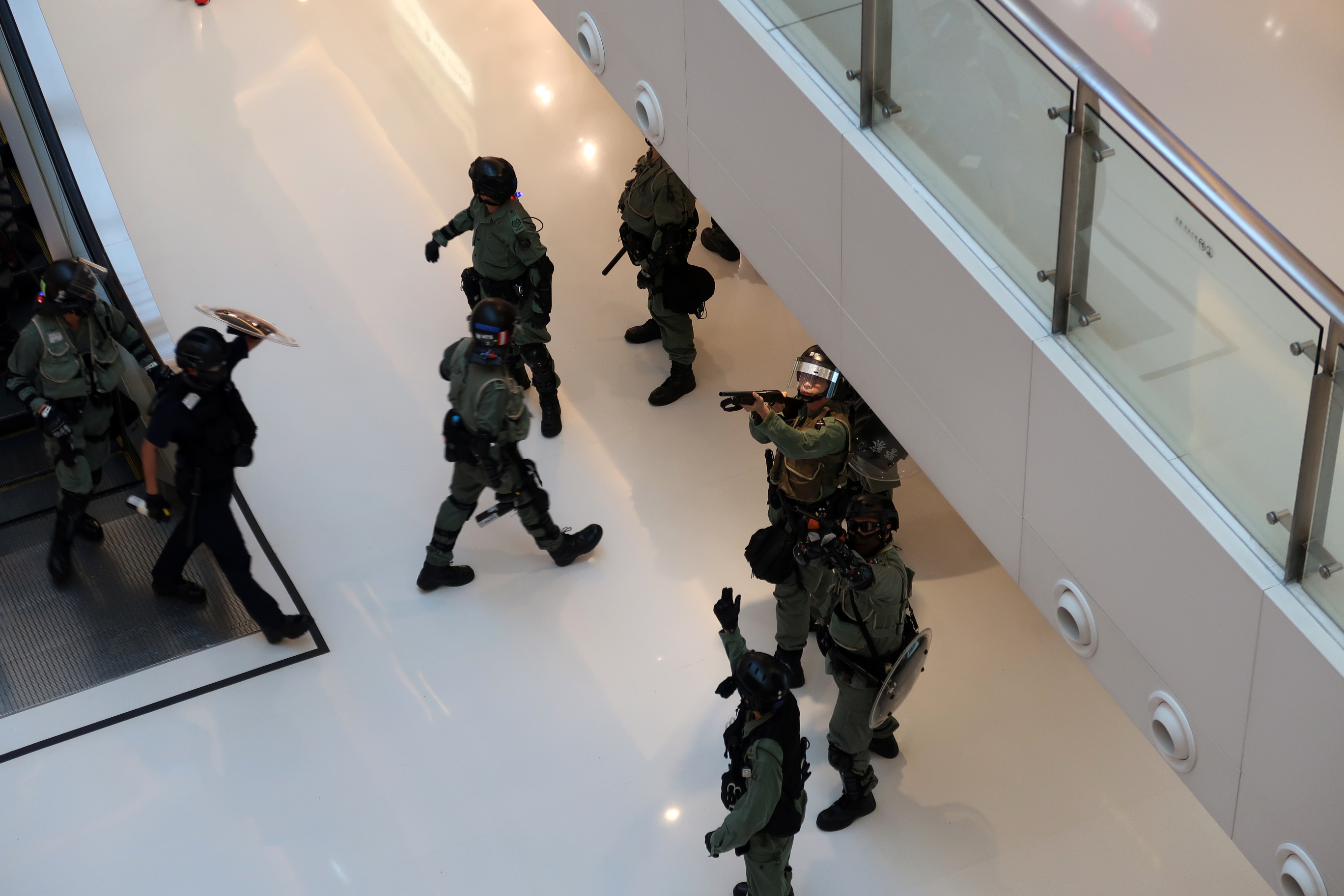
Riot police target people on 3 November 2019

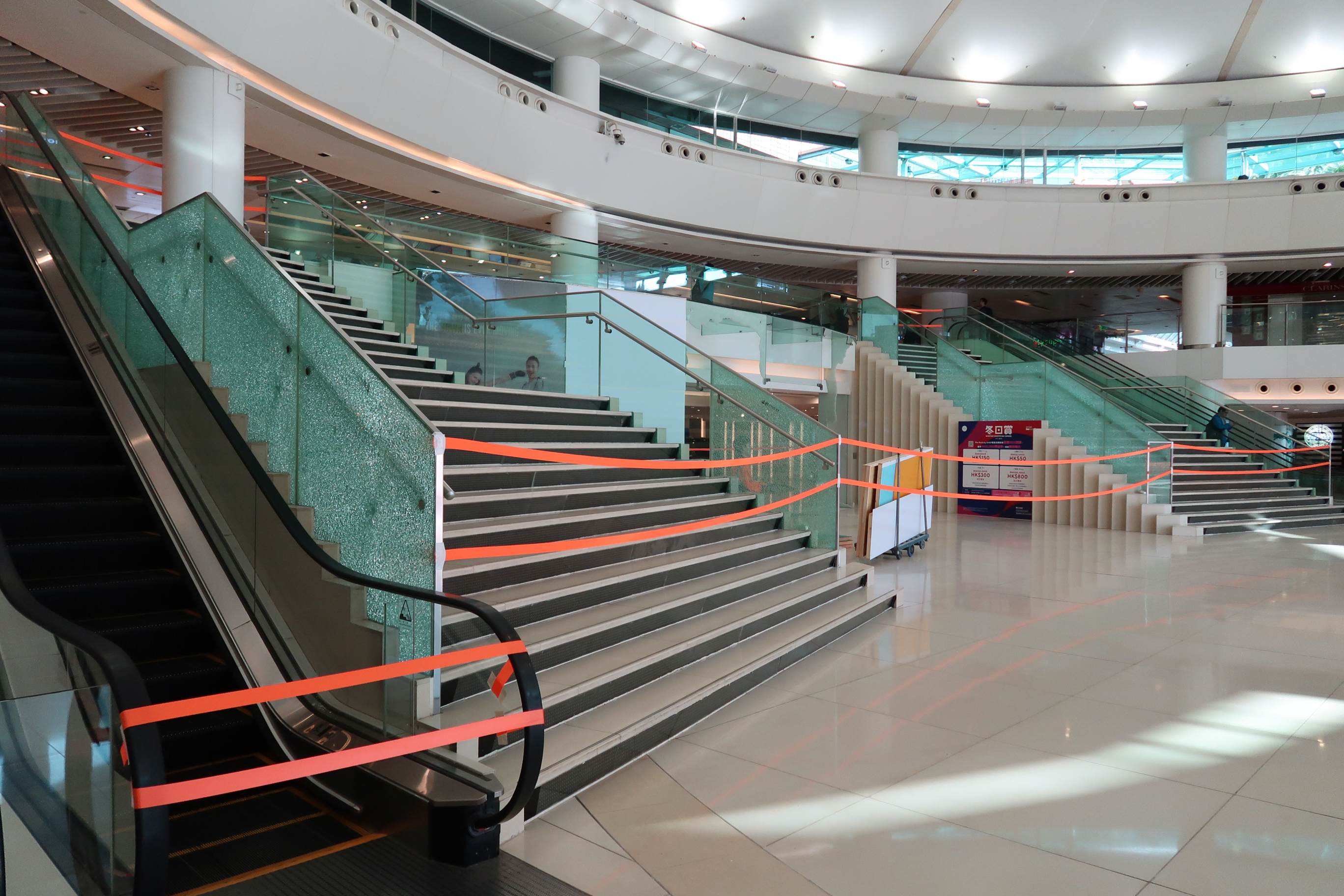
Entrance arena glass damage on 9 November 2019

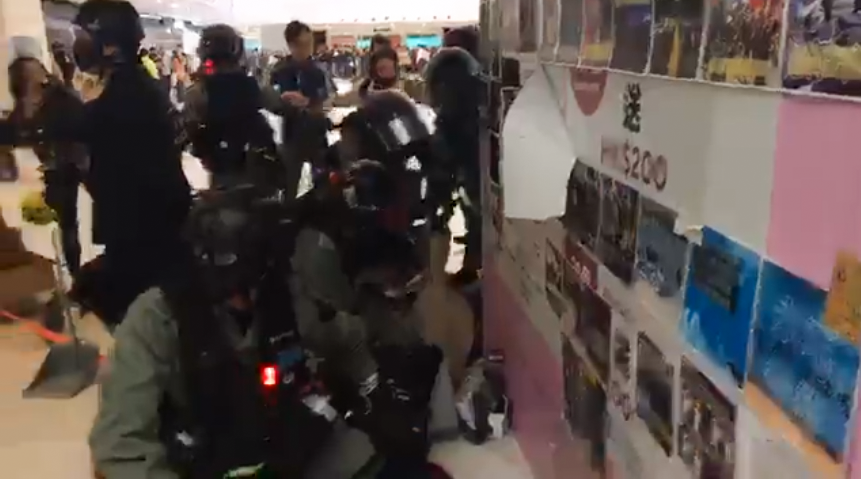
Police arrest protestors on 15 December 2019

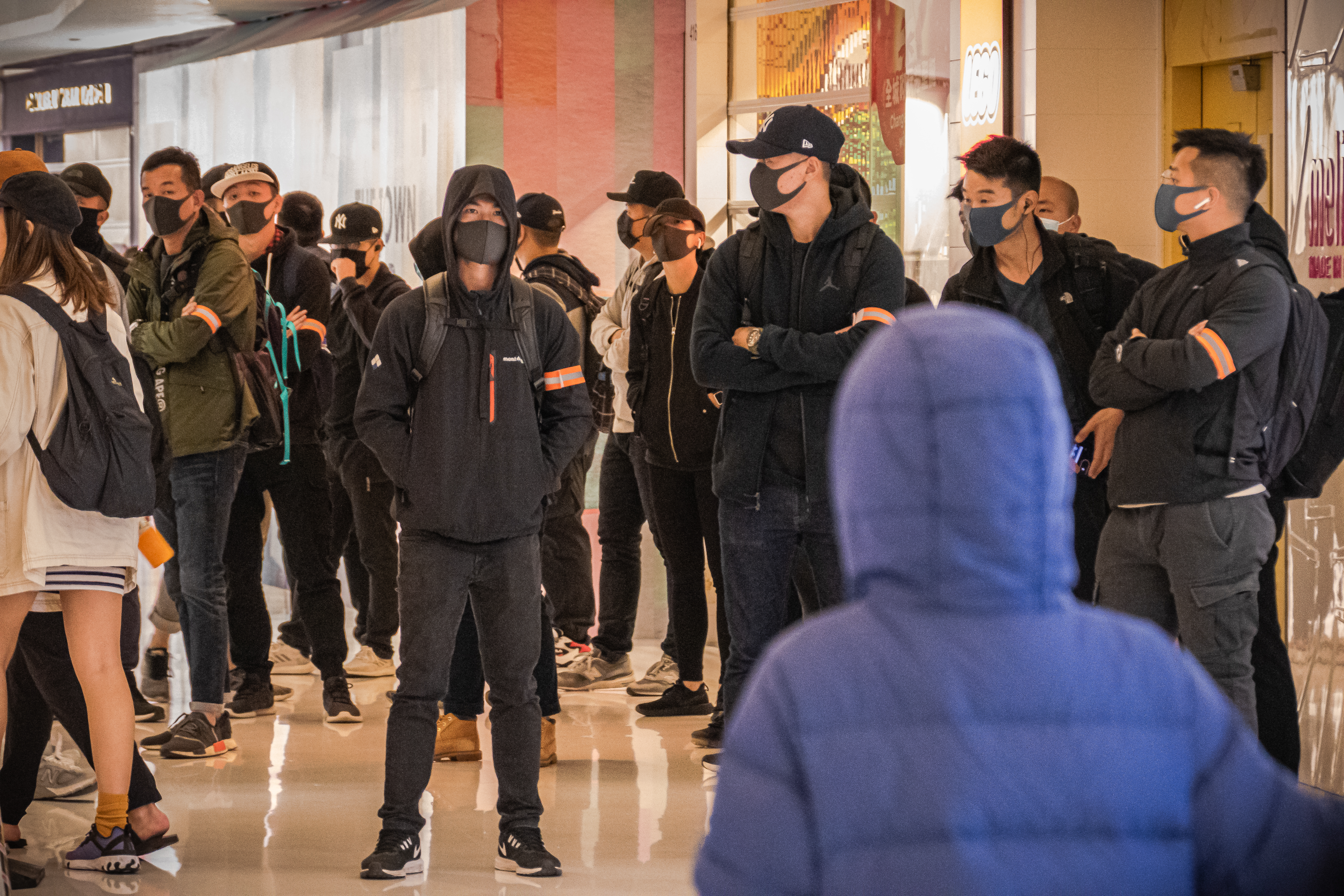
Plainclothes police in New Town Plaza on 24 December 2019
