= Shatin Centre =

Housing estate in Sha Tin, Hong Kong

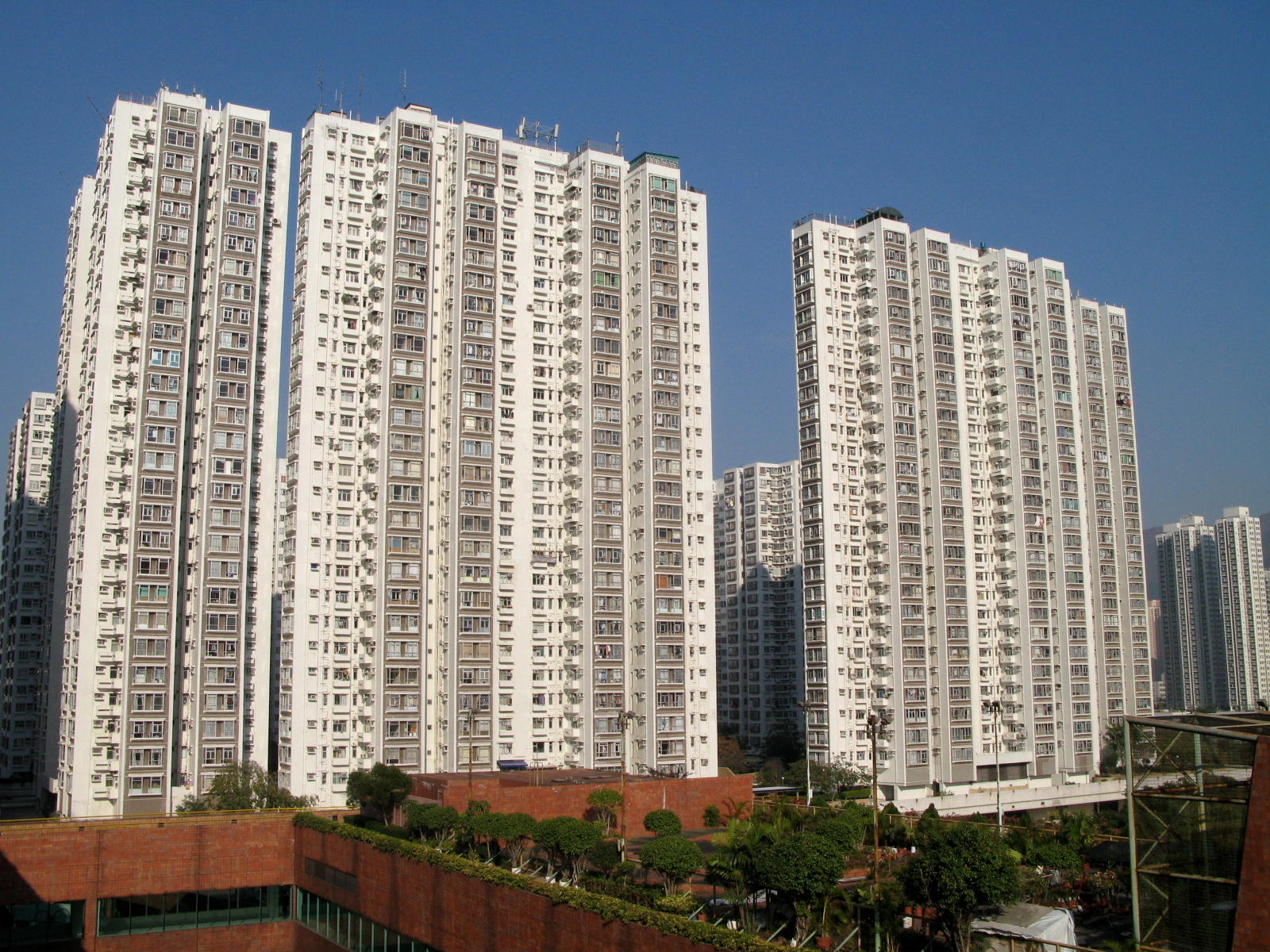
Sha Tin Centre

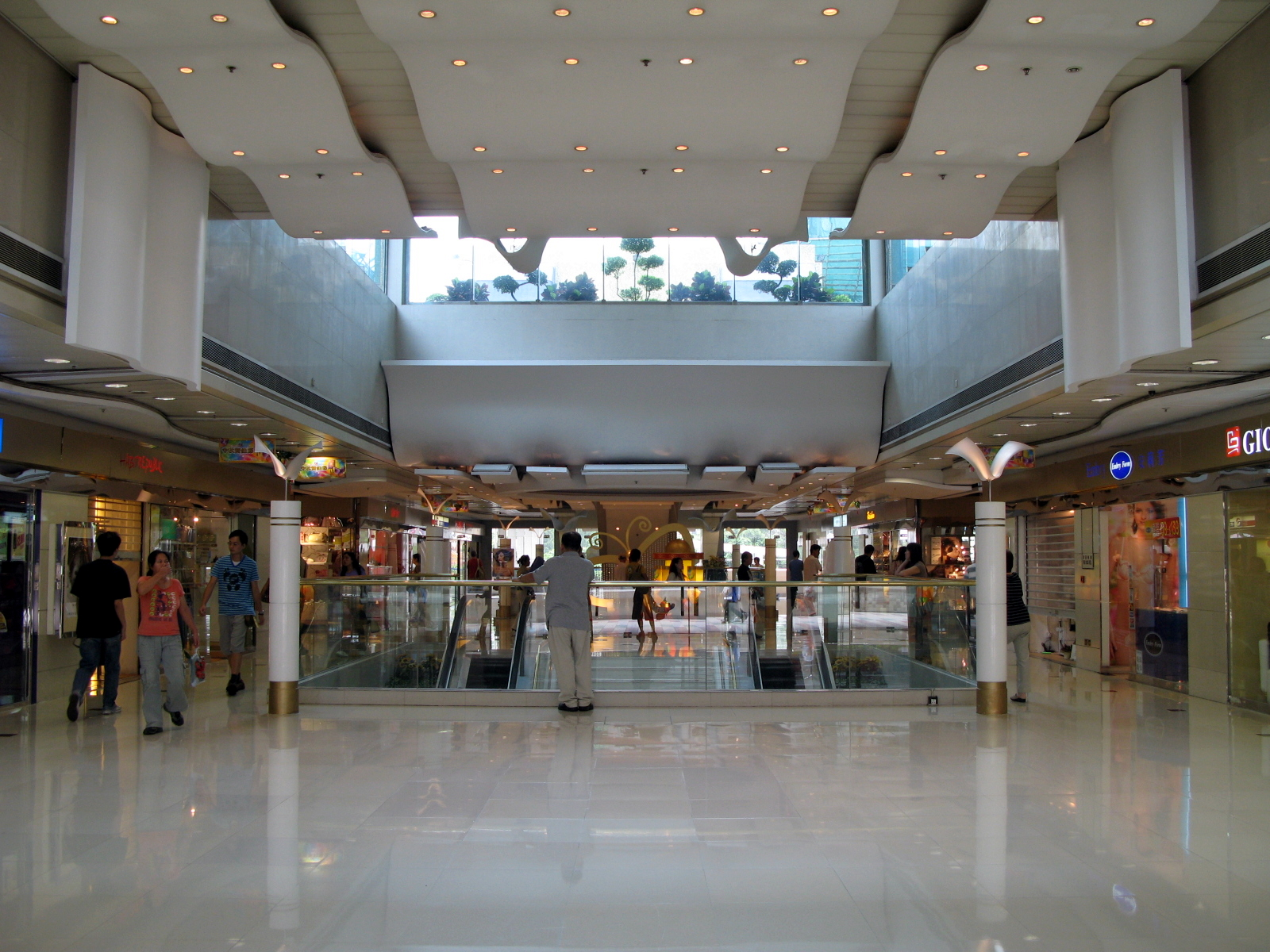
Sha Tin Centre Shopping Arcade

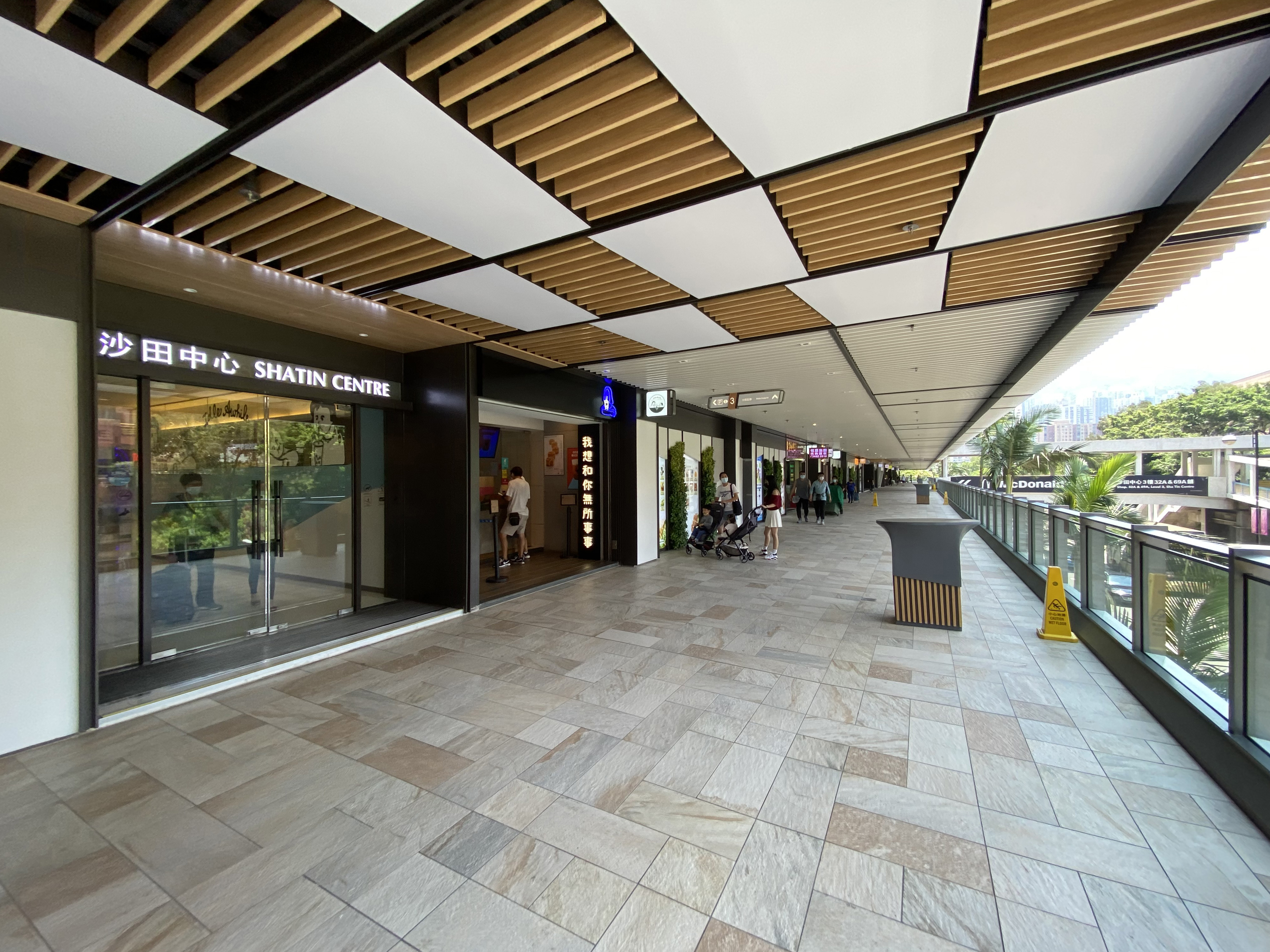
Outside access of the shopping arcade after renovation in 2020

Shatin Centre (Chinese: 沙田中心) is one of the main private housing estates in Sha Tin Town Centre, Sha Tin District, New Territories, Hong Kong, which is near New Town Plaza Phase I, Lucky Plaza, Shatin Plaza and Sha Tin station. It comprises 8 high-rise buildings and a shopping arcade, developed by Henderson Land Development in 1981. The address for Sha Tin Centre is 2-16 Wang Pok Street.

== History ==
The estate was designed by Andrew Lee King Fun and Associates, a Hong Kong architecture firm. The shopping arcade complete the renovation in 1997, 2015 to 2020.

== See also ==
- Shatin Plaza
- Private housing estates in Sha Tin District
