= Shatin Plaza =

Housing estate in Sha Tin, Hong Kong

Coordinates: 22.383122°N 114.189217°E

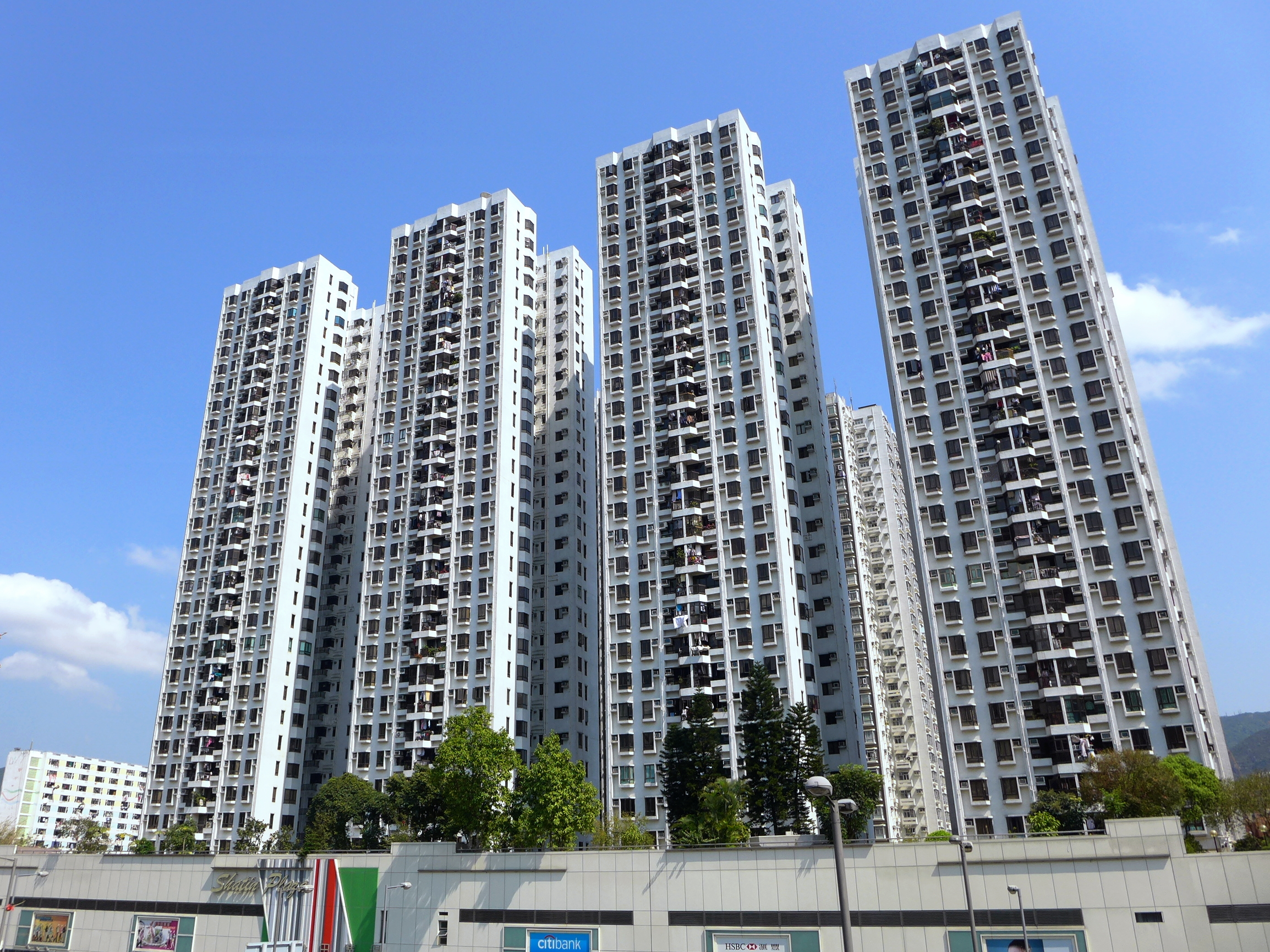
Sha Tin Plaza

Shatin Plaza (Chinese: 沙田廣場) is a private housing estate and shopping arcade in Sha Tin Town Centre, Sha Tin District, New Territories, Hong Kong. Shatin Plaza is located near New Town Plaza Phase I, Lucky Plaza and Shatin Centre. Shatin Plaza was developed by Henderson Land Development in 1988.

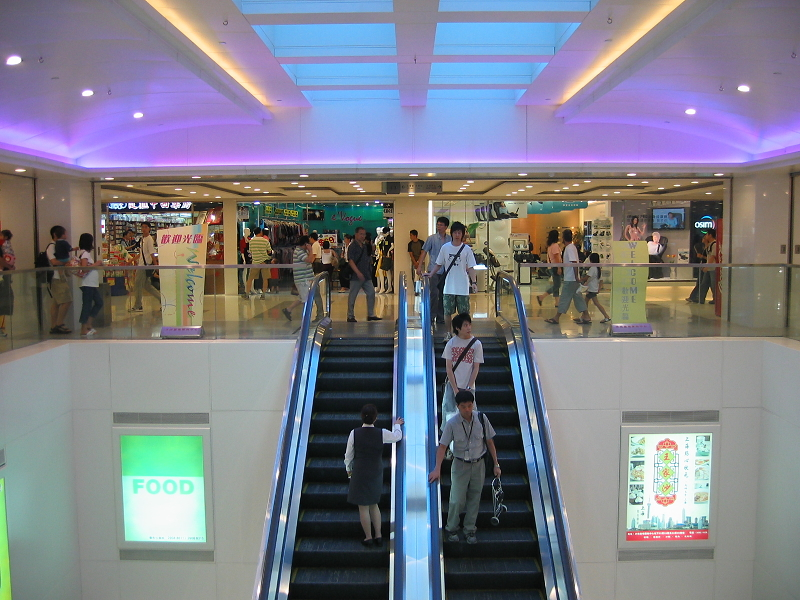
Sha Tin Plaza Shopping Arcade

== Shopping mall ==
The shopping mall is located at the first and third floor of the building. The shopping mall was renovated in 2005, 2007 and 2023. The 2023 renovation brought about a new escalator design.

Most stores in Shatin Plaza is located in the third floor. The first floor only contain a few restaurants and banks. The third floor contains pharamacies, restaurants, clothing stores, food stores, phone stores and a barber shop.

The mall provides a parking lot at the second floor.

== Housing estate ==
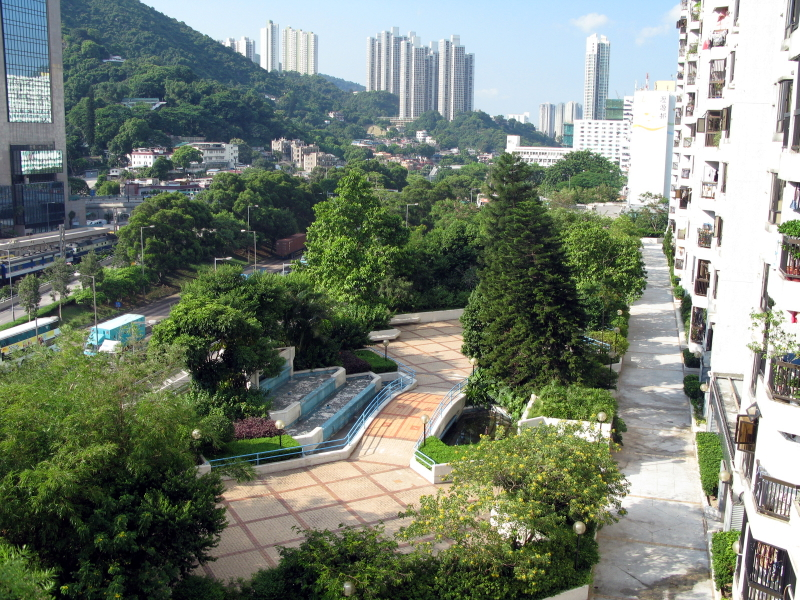
Garden at the housing area

Shatin Plaza contains four apartment buildings each building are 27 stories tall, providing a total of 430 flats with 700 square feet, 900 square feet and 1,140 square feet apartment options.

The platform located at the base of these apartment buildings provides a few gardens, a children's playground, a kindergarten and a youth center.

== Transportation ==
Shatin Plaza has a walkbridge on the third floor that connects to Shatin Centre and 2 points that connect to New Town Plaza Phase I.

Shatin Plaza is located near Shatin Central Bus Terminus which is a major transportation hub in Sha Tin. The plaza is also next to Sha Tin MTR Station.

Shatin Centre used to be Sha Tin Hui Bus Terminus (Chinese: 沙田墟巴士總站).

== See also ==
- Shatin Centre
- Private housing estates in Sha Tin District
- Shopping malls
